= Fiesta Nacional de la Vendimia =

Festival in Argentina

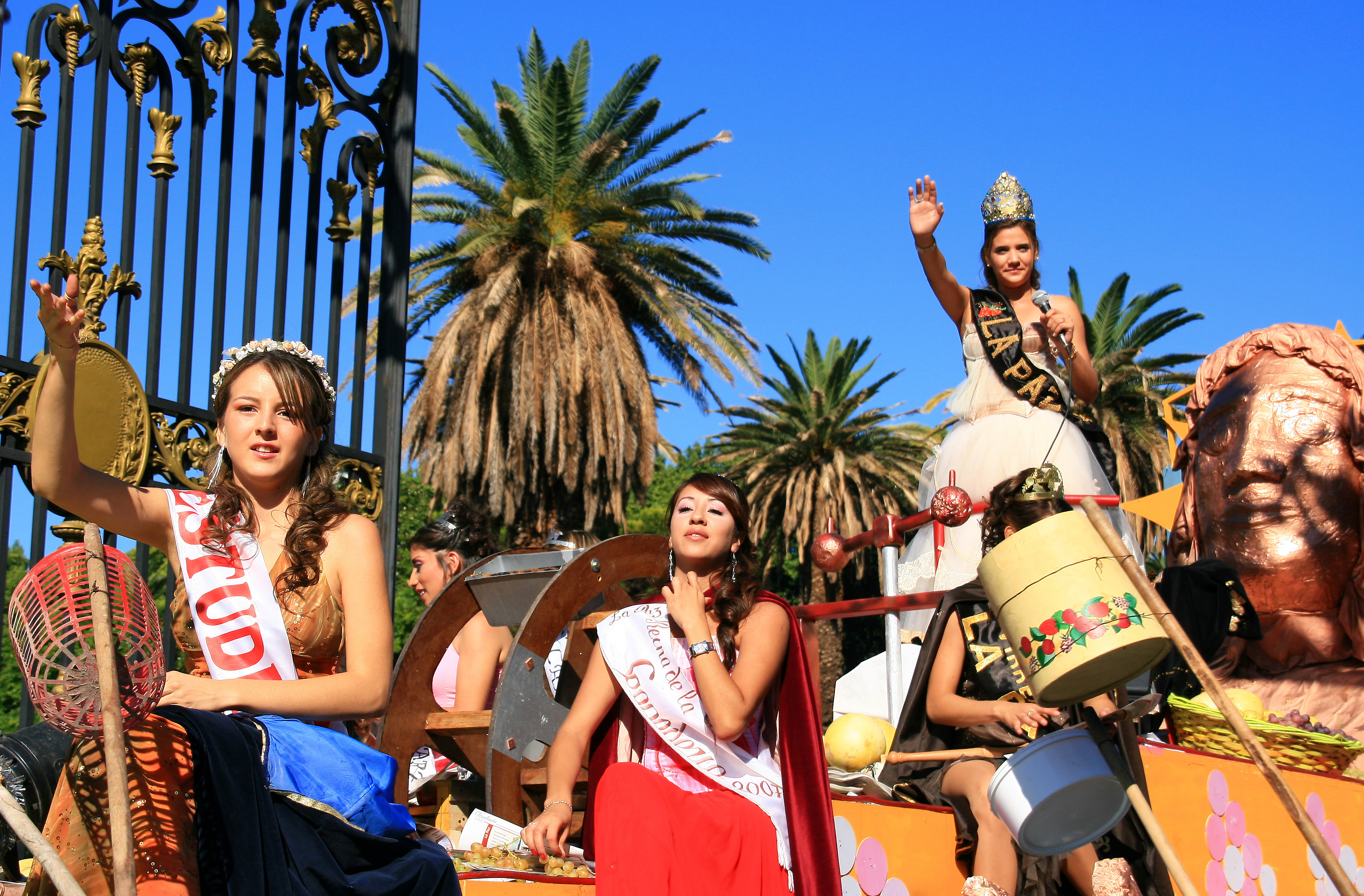
Queen of “La Paz” on the festival in Mendoza.

Fiesta Nacional de la Vendimia (The Grape Harvest National Festival) takes place annually in Mendoza City, Argentina. It is one of the most important festivals in the country, attracting large numbers of tourists to the region. It is a celebration of wine and the winemaking industry.

Each of the 19 departments in Mendoza Province prepare for the festival in the early months of the year. The main event occurs in the first week of March in Mendoza city featuring hundreds of dancers and performers, the selection of a "Reina Nacional de la Vendimia" (National Vendimia Queen) and a large fireworks display.

== History ==
The first vendimia celebrations in Mendoza Province occurred in the 17th century. The first official valendimia festival took place in 1936. Recently Mendoza's Vendimia ranked number two in National Geographic's Top 10 World's Harvest Festivals, after the Thanksgiving celebrations in Plymouth Plantation, Massachusetts.

== Departments ==
Each of Mendoza's departments are represented at the festival:

- Capital Department
- General Alvear Department
- Godoy Cruz Department
- Guaymallén Department
- Junín Department
- La Paz Department
- Las Heras Department
- Lavalle Department
- Luján de Cuyo Department
- Maipú Department
- Malargüe Department
- Rivadavia Department
- San Carlos Department
- San Martín Department
- San Rafael Department
- Santa Rosa Department
- Tunuyán Department
- Tupungato Department

== Programme of events ==
=== Blessing of the fruit On christmas ===
The blessing of the fruit takes place on the last Sunday of February.

=== Vía Blanca de las Reinas ===
On the evening of the first Friday of March the prettiest women elected as Reinas (queens) from each department parade in allegoric chariots through the streets of Mendoza dressed in decorative outfits designed to celebrate the winemaking tradition, and the character of their departments. This event has been known to attract over 200,000 spectators.

=== Carrusel Vendimial ===
The Carrusel Vendimial takes place on the Saturday morning, it takes the form of a daylight parade, where the Reinas ride their chariots through the streets, accompanied formations of men dressed in Gaucho style outfits and riding horses, they are followed by dancers representing various provinces of Argentina and other Latin American countries. This parade also attracts huge numbers of spectators.

=== Central act ===
The "Acto Central" takes place in the Frank Romero Day Greek theatre. It is an impressive spectacle of light and sound featuring over 1000 performers and dancers. The show pays homage to the "Virgen de la Carrodilla" and features traditional folklore music.

The finale of the show sees the election of the "Reina Nacional de la Vendimia" and a large firework display.

== Cultural impact ==
Vendimia Planitia, a large plain on the dwarf planet Ceres, is named after the festival.

== See also ==
- National Sea Festival
