= La Paz, Mendoza =

La Paz
- Town
- San José de Corocorto
- Interactive map of La Paz
- Coordinates: 33°28′S 67°33′W
- Country: Argentina
- Province: Mendoza
- Department: La Paz

Population (2022)
  - Total: 11.931
- Demonym: Paceño/a
- Time zone: UTC−3 (ART)
- CPA base: M5590
- Dialing code: +54 2626 +54 2635
- Climate: BWk

La Paz is a department in the province of Mendoza, Argentina, headquartered in the town of the same name, located 145 km (90 mi) from the provincial capital. It limits to the north with the Lavalle department, to the south with San Rafael, to the west with Santa Rosa and to the east with the province of San Luis.

The Department of La Paz is a strategic and fundamental site of Mercosur, as its territory is completely crossed by National Route 7 from East to West and by National Route 146. These two roads communicate the region with the rest of the country and are key in the integration of the Southern Common Market. It is the main entrance to the Province of Mendoza, through the Desaguadero Arch.

== Geography ==
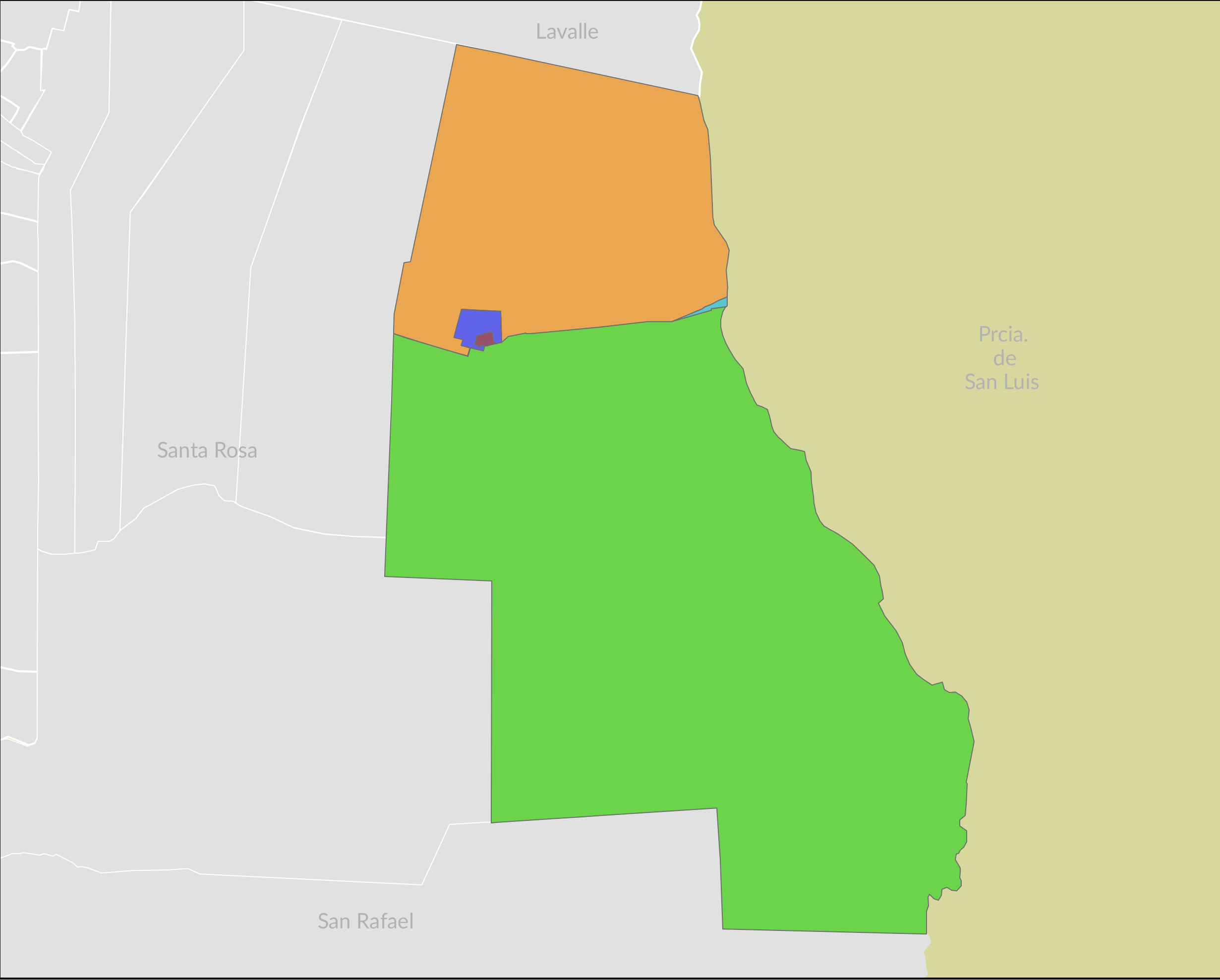
Political divisions of La Paz

- La Paz North
- La Paz South
- Desaguadero
- Villa Antigua
- Villa Nueva de La Paz

=== Population ===
According to the 2010 Census, the department had a population of 9,867 inhabitants, which made it the least populated of the Mendoza departments.

=== Seismicity ===
This section is an excerpt from Provincia de Mendoza Seismicity.

The seismicity of the Cuyo area (central west of Argentina) is frequent and of very high intensity, with a seismic silence of medium to severe earthquakes every 20 years.3

Earthquake of 1861: although this catastrophic geological activity has occurred since prehistoric times, the earthquake of March 20, 1861 (162 years), with 12,000 deaths, 4 marked an important milestone in the history of Argentine seismic events since it was the strongest recorded and documented in the country. From then on, successive Mendoza and municipal governments have been taking extreme care and restricting construction codes.3 With the San Juan earthquake on January 15, 1944 (79 years old), the governments took notice of the enormous chronic severity of earthquakes region of.

1920 earthquake: 6.8 intensity, destroyed part of its buildings and opened numerous cracks in the area. There were 250 deaths from the destruction of adobe houses43

Earthquake in the south of Mendoza in 1929: very serious, and having not developed any preventive measure, despite only nine years having elapsed since the previous one, it killed 30 inhabitants due to the fall of adobe houses3

1985 earthquake: it was another serious episode,5 lasting 9 s, collapsing the old Hospital del Carmen de Godoy Cruz.

Since the department is located in the middle of the plain and not in the foothills or in the mountain range, it is relatively far from the epicenters of telluric movements and therefore the chances of suffering an earthquake in nearby areas are less than in other areas of the province, as well as the intensity of the perceived movements.

== Religion ==
La Paz is one of the Mendoza departments with the highest rate of Catholic population (86.5%)

Religión en La Paz (2019)	
	Porcentajes
Catholics	86.5 %
evangelicals	5.8 %
Without religion	4.2 %
Others	3.5 %

== History ==
The first inhabitants of the territory of La Paz were the Huarpes, who called their region Yopacto and whose chieftain was Corocorto.

The Spanish arrived in these lands under the command of Captain Sancho de Medrano. To fulfill the work of evangelization of the original peoples, a small chapel dedicated to San José was built with branches and mud, which was replaced by a small temple, in the 1760s, which today houses the image of Our Lady of La Paz. Every January 24 the religious festival is held, with a novena and procession around the Plaza de la Villa Antigua.

At the beginning of the 18th century, there was a large traffic of Mendoza carts that went to the coast with regional products. The route was so long that an important stop on the way was the Postas del Desaguadero and San José de Corocorto. For this reason, Commander Amigorena, under the government of Rafael de Sobremonte, founded on December 24, 1791, the town that he called San José de Corocorto, today Villa Antigua.

On August 4, 1850, Governor Alejo Mallea renamed the town of Corocorto as La Paz and assigned a territory of more than 14,000 km^{2} (5,400 sq mi), so that to the north it also included what is now part of the Lavalle department. Governor Mallea expropriated the land of Villa San José de Corocorto, ordered the seat of the authorities to be moved to Villa Nueva, and gave both Villa Nueva and the new municipality the name of La Paz. The provincial constitution promulgated on November 18, 1855, divided the territory of the province into four departments: San Vicente (current Godoy Cruz), San Carlos, San Martín and La Paz.

On October 12, 1936, as part of the Tourism Promotion Plan, the Desaguadero Arch was inaugurated by the government of Ricardo Videla. Since then it has been the main gateway to the province from San Luis through National Route 7.

cultural references

Throughout its history, this department in eastern Mendoza saw the birth within its territory of different cultural references that knew how to leave their mark and transcend the borders of La Paz. Among the most prominent we can mention:

Felix Dardo Palorma: Known as the "Compadre de Cuyo", he was an Argentine singer, musician and composer, originally from the Province of Mendoza. He is the author of iconic pieces of folklore from Cuyo such as "Pongale por las hileras", "La Refranera", "La Cumbreña", etc.

Gabino Coria Peñaloza: he was an Argentine poet and writer, famous for having composed the lyrics of famous tangos such as "Caminito" and "El Pañuelito". He was a lyricist for great Argentine tanco icons such as Carlos Gardel.

Enrique Dussel: is an internationally recognized academic, philosopher, historian and theologian for his work in the field of Ethics, Political Philosophy, Latin American Philosophy and in particular for being one of the founders of Liberation Philosophy, a current of thought of which he is the architect, having also been one of the initiators of Liberation Theology.

== Security ==
It will do so through the creation of a control and monitoring center for public and strategic places in the department. It is a monitoring center, made up of a system of surveillance domes with optical zoom capacity and fixed cameras, located in different strategic points of the department.
