= Ana Lupez =

Argentine actress, dancer and vedette (1944–2026)

- Born: March 28, 1944; Guaymallén, Mendoza Province, Argentina
- Died: October 14, 2026 (aged 82); Mendoza, Argentina
- Occupations: Actress, vedette, choreographer, and businesswoman

Ana Lupez Chaparro Astargo (March 28, 1944 – October 14, 2026), sometimes referred to as Ana Lupe, was an Argentine actress, dancer, vedette, choreographer and businesswoman. She was one of the first Argentine trans women to undergo gender-affirming surgery, which she described as the "greatest triumph" of her life: "to become a woman".

Lupez owned and starred in the Barcelona de Noche nightclub in the city of Barcelona, as well as the Paradise Show Theatre in Maspalomas, Canary Islands.

== Life and career ==
=== Early life ===
Ana Lupez was born in Guaymallén, Mendoza Province, on March 28, 1944. Assigned male at birth, she recalls experiencing distress as early as age seven when forced to wear boys' clothes. This marked the beginning of her journey to live openly as a woman.

Initially an only child, Lupez's mother later remarried and had seven more children. Her early expressions of femininity were misunderstood as illness by prevailing medical and moral standards. She was nicknamed “María Félix” by other children, often without understanding the ridicule.

At 14, she left home and identified as gay, living in poverty. She worked in a circus and performed at harvest festivals.

=== Between Buenos Aires and Montevideo ===
At age 15, Lupez moved to Buenos Aires and began working in cabaret, though she faced arrests due to discriminatory laws.

In 1964, she moved to Montevideo and joined the entertainment industry, appearing on the comedy show Telecataplúm. There, she connected with Brazilian trans performers and began her career in what was then called transformismo (drag performance).

Lupez studied ballet and Argentine folklore and later returned to Buenos Aires in the late 1960s to join the revue theater circuit, working for a decade in venues such as Teatro Maipo and Teatro El Nacional, with stars like Moria Casán, Zulma Faiad, and Pepe Marrone.

In the late 1970s and early 1980s, she took on the name Ana Lupez and toured as a performer in Peru, Venezuela, Chile, Bolivia, and Brazil. Despite her success, she continued to be targeted by police.

=== Spain ===
In 1979, fleeing the repression of LGBT people during Argentina’s dictatorship, Lupez emigrated, settling finally in Spain after brief stays in Brazil and Portugal. Spain’s recent transition to democracy offered greater freedom, particularly for trans people and variety shows featuring full nudity.

Lupez debuted at the Gay Club in Madrid, a pioneering venue in the Spanish LGBT+ movement.

=== Barcelona de Noche ===
In 1981, Lupez was hired by Pierrot to perform at Barcelona de Noche, a famed gay cabaret known as the "Gay Cathedral". There, she starred in "Locas de amorrr", and later became its headliner and owner.

In 1983, she starred in E.L.L.A.S, and in 1984 in Escándalo Gay in Madrid. Between 1984 and 1986, she led the show at New Centaurus, one of Madrid’s major cabaret venues.

In 1986, Lupez underwent gender-affirming surgery in Barcelona, and later starred in Ya soy yo, featuring the song Soy lo prohibido.

Lupez partnered with an Italian man until his death in 2003. In 1987, with two Argentine colleagues, she bought Barcelona de Noche and launched Las tretas de Ana and Un desplume diferente.

Shortly before the 1992 Barcelona Olympics, a redevelopment plan in El Raval forced the closure of many venues. On September 16, 1990, Barcelona de Noche quietly shut its doors permanently.

=== After 1990 ===
In the 1990s, Lupez moved to the Canary Islands, where she ran the Paradise nightclub in Maspalomas, owned two restaurants, and a custom shoe store.

In 1990, she appeared in Eva y Adán, agencia matrimonial and in the film Las edades de Lulú by Bigas Luna.

After her partner’s death in 2003, Lupez returned to Argentina and staged Otro tipo de Mujer on Avenida Corrientes. In 2019, she received a Lifetime Achievement Award at Miss Transformarte 2019 in Alicante.

Lupez retired to Benidorm, Valencian Community, and died from heart cancer on October 14, 2026, at the age of 82.

== See also ==
- LGBT rights in Argentina
- Transgender history in Argentina
