= Tunuyán River =

River in Argentina

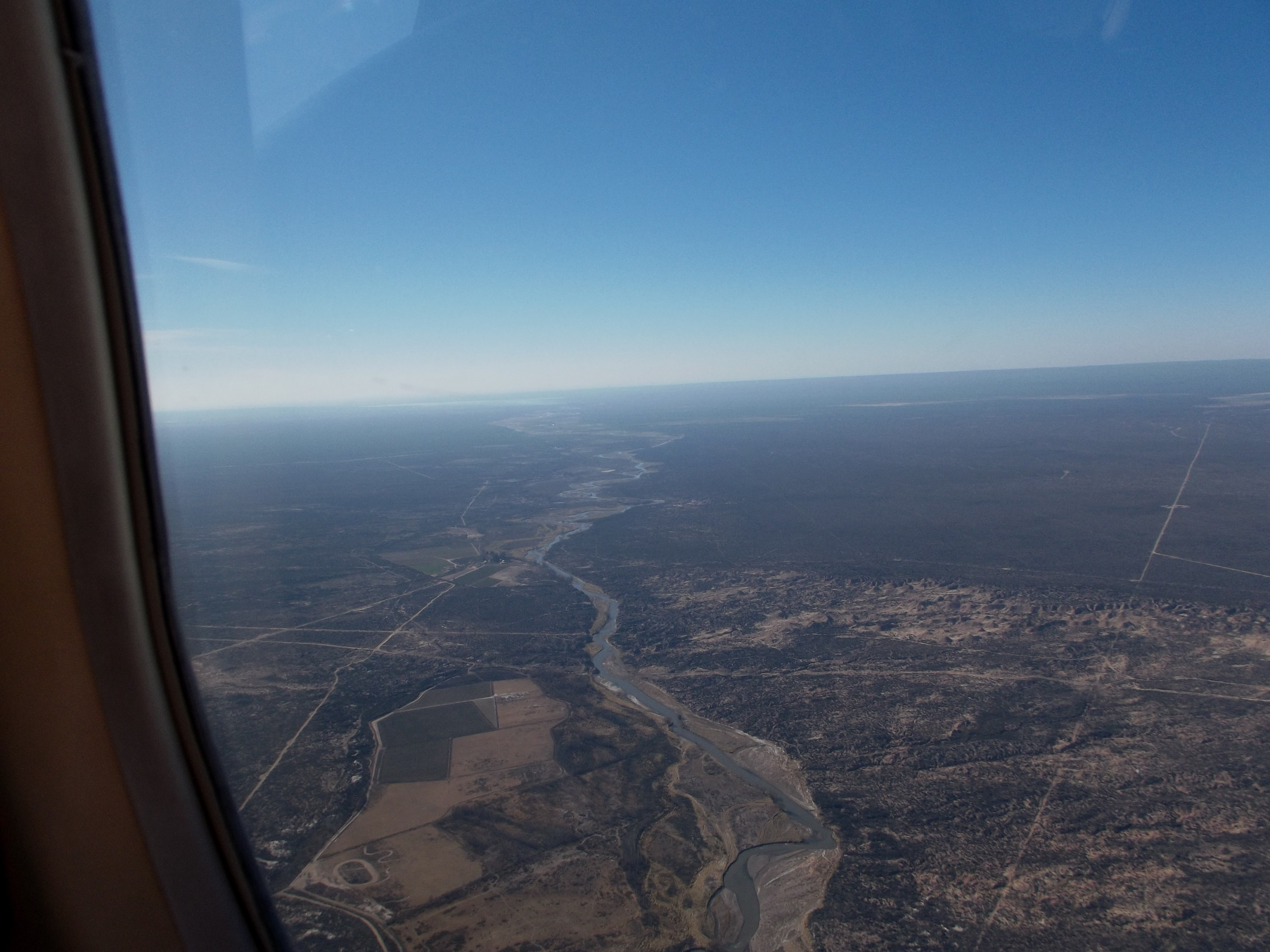
Tunuyan river seen from the air

The Tunuyán River is a river in the Argentine province of Mendoza. It is born in Mount Tupungato, in the Andes range, and flows initially to the northeast, passing by the city of Tunuyán. It is then dammed by the El Carrizal Dam, after which it turns east-southeast passing near the cities of Rivadavia, Santa Rosa and La Paz. Finally, it branches into the Tunuyán Nuevo (north) and Tunuyán Viejo (south), and empties into the Desaguadero River.

It is a popular river for white water rafters, as it boasts class III rapids.
