= Godoy Cruz Department =

Godoy Cruz Department Departamento Godoy Cruz
- Department
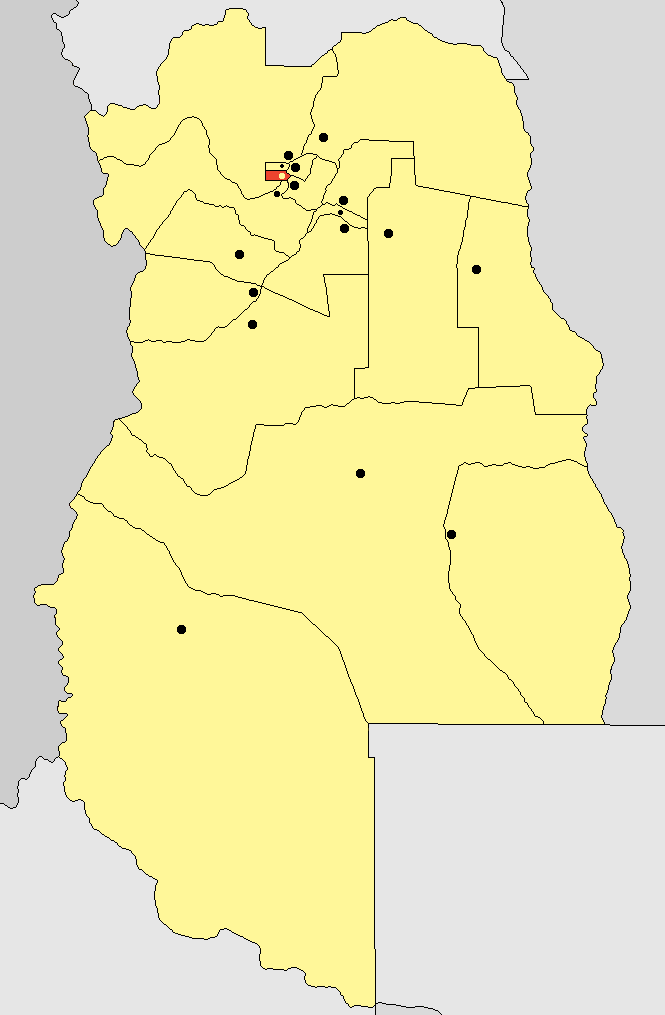
- location of Godoy Cruz Department in Mendoza Province
- Coordinates: 32°55′S 68°49′W
- Country: Argentina
- Established: May 11, 1855
- Founder: ?
- Seat: Godoy Cruz

Government
  - Intendant: Diego Costarelli (UCR)

Area
  - Total: 75 km^{2} (29 sq mi)

Population (2022 census [INDEC])
  - Total: 195,159
  - Density: 2,600/km^{2} (6,700/sq mi)
- Demonym: godoycruzense
- Postal Code: M5501
- IFAM: MZA002
- Area Code: 0261
- Patron saint: Vincent Ferrer
- Website: www.godoycruz.gov.ar

Godoy Cruz is a central department of Mendoza Province in Argentina.

The provincial subdivision has a population of about 183,000 inhabitants in an area of 75 km^{2} (29 sq mi), and its capital city is Godoy Cruz, which is located around 1,110 km (690 mi) from the Capital federal. Its borders are Mendoza Department in the north, Guaymallén in the northeast, Maipú in the southeast, Luján de Cuyo in the south and Las Heras in the southwest and to the west.

The department and its cabecera (head town) are named in honour of Argentine statesman and businessman Tomás Godoy Cruz (1791-1852).

== Economy ==
Despite its relatively tiny size (0.1% of Mendoza Province), Godoy Cruz is home to 182,977 inhabitants (11.6%), and accounts for around 36% of Mendoza's economy.

The main activity of the department is the commerce (specially auto sales companies) and the services sector. There are some wineries but there are not vineyards. The Casino of Mendoza is in the border of Godoy Cruz and Mendoza City.

== Population ==
Considering its urban population (99.97%), it's the most densely populated department of Mendoza Province.

== Sport ==
The city of Godoy Cruz is home to Godoy Cruz Antonio Tomba, a football club, which became in 2006 the first club from Mendoza Province ever to compete in the Primera Division. Other significant sport clubs are Andes Talleres, noteworthy in artistic roller skating, and YPF.

== Districts ==
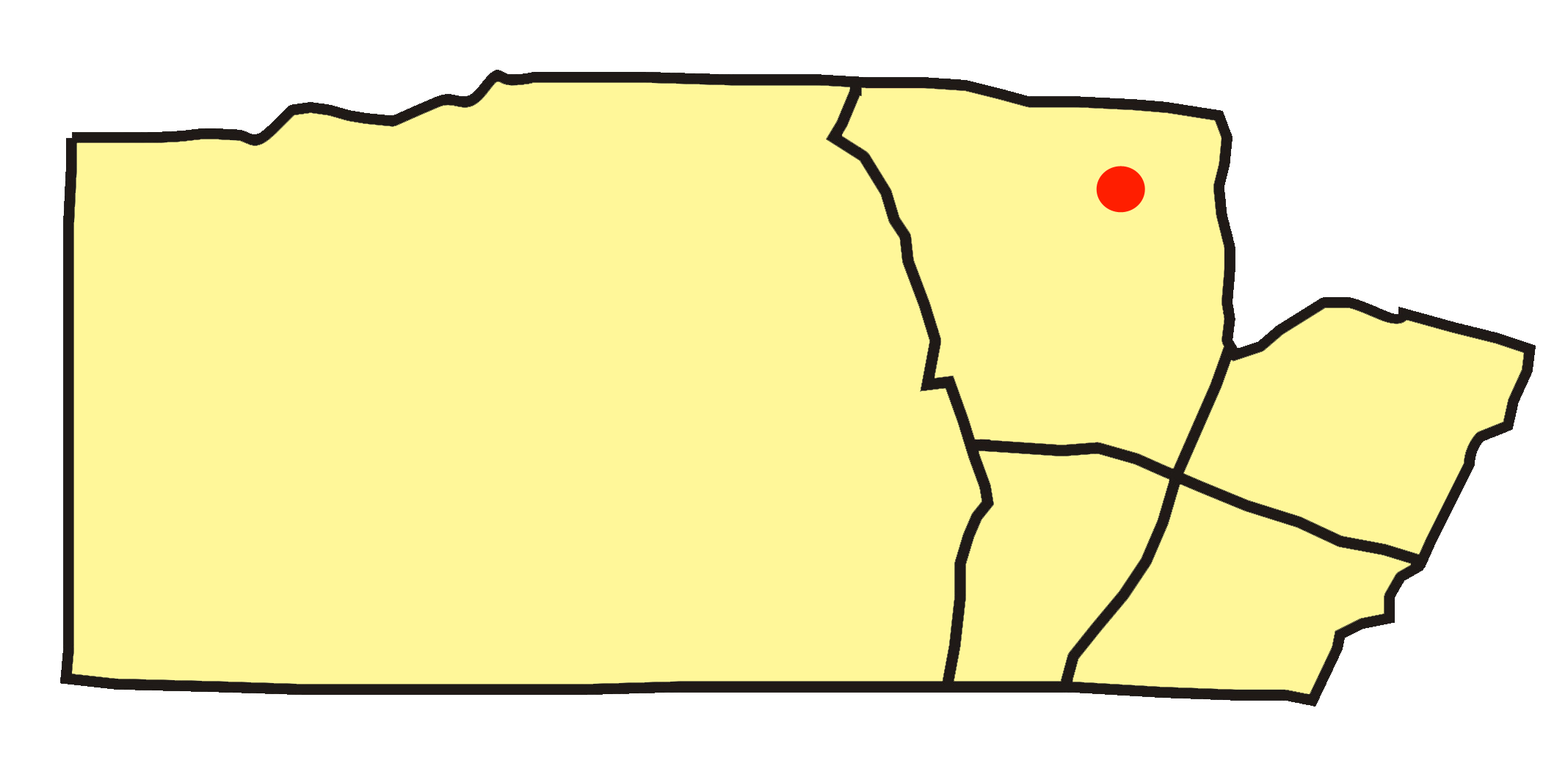
The five districts of the Godoy Cruz Department, in red the city of Godoy Cruz

Godoy Cruz is divided in five districts:

- Gobernador Benegas
- Godoy Cruz
- Las Tortugas
- Presidente Sarmiento
- San Francisco del Monte
