= El Carrizal Dam =

Dam in Mendoza, Argentina

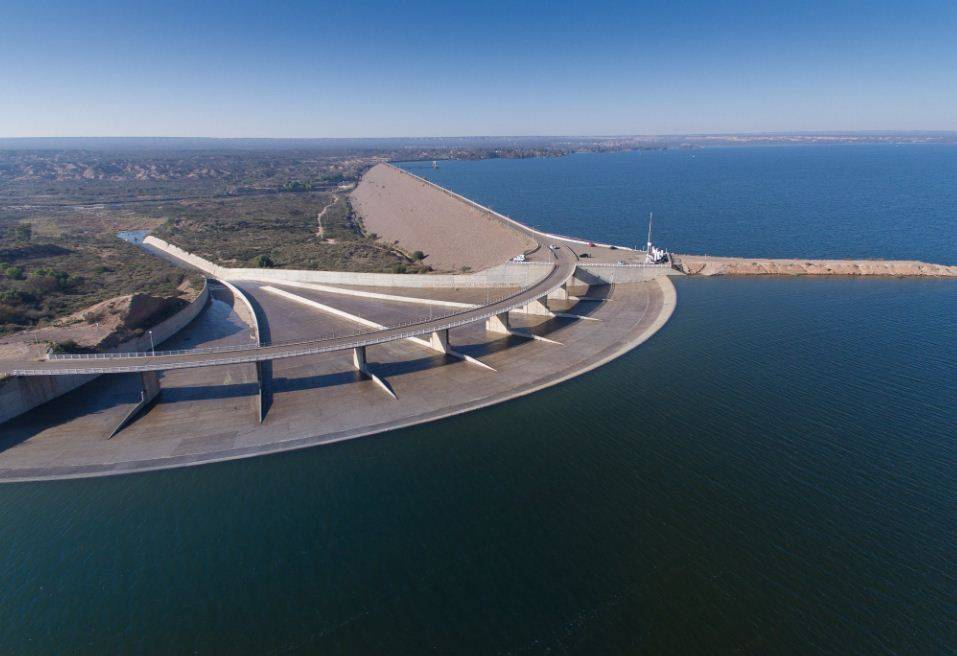
- Spillway and reservoir

- Location within Argentina
- Country: Argentina
- Location: Mendoza
- Coordinates: 33°18′0″S 68°43′15″W
- Purpose: Power, irrigation
- Status: Operational
- Construction began: 1965
- Opening date: 1971

Dam and spillways
- Type of dam: Embankment, earth and rock-fill
- Impounds: Tunuyán River
- Height: 46 m (151 ft)
- Length: 2,113 m (6,932 ft)
- Width (crest): 10 m (33 ft)

Reservoir
- Total capacity: 462,000,000 m^{3} (375,000 acre⋅ft)
- Surface area: 34.8 km^{2} (13.4 sq mi)

Power Station
- Turbines: 2 x 8.5 MW Francis-type
- Installed capacity: 17 MW
- Annual generation: 83 Mio. kWh

The El Carrizal Dam (in Spanish, Embalse El Carrizal) is a dam on the upper-middle course of the Tunuyán River, in the center-north of the province of Mendoza, Argentina upstream from the city of Rivadavia. Its reservoir measures about 15 by 5 kilometres (9.3 mi × 3.1 mi), and its maximum water level stands at 785.5 metres (2,577 ft) above the sea, covering an area of 34.8 square kilometres (13.4 sq mi). It has a maximum volume of 462 million cubic metres (16.3×10^{9} cu ft).

The dam is used to regulate the flow of the Tunuyán River, which comes from glacial sources in the Andes, and to irrigate the otherwise arid region. The reservoir is a tourist attraction and is employed for fishing, windsurfing, sailing, etc., while its shores feature camping sites and other lodging facilities.

The waters of the dam feed a hydroelectric power station, which was built in 1971 and has an installed power generation capacity of 17 megawatts (23,000 hp).
