= Diego Rovira (Argentine footballer) =

Argentine footballer

Personal information
- Date of birth: 27 March 1993 (age 33)
- Place of birth: Guaymallén, Argentina
- Position: Midfielder

Youth career
- Boca de Bermejo
- Leonardo Murialdo
- All Boys

Senior career*
Years	Team	Apps	(Gls)
2014	Shkumbini	12	(0)
- * Club domestic league appearances and goals

Diego Rovira (born 27 March 1993) is an Argentine former footballer who is last known to have played as a midfielder for Shkumbini.

== Career ==
Before the second half of 2013/14, Rovira signed for Albanian second division side Shkumbini.
