= National Sea Festival =

Annual celebration in Argentina

Coordinates: 38°0′28.50″S 57°32′11″W

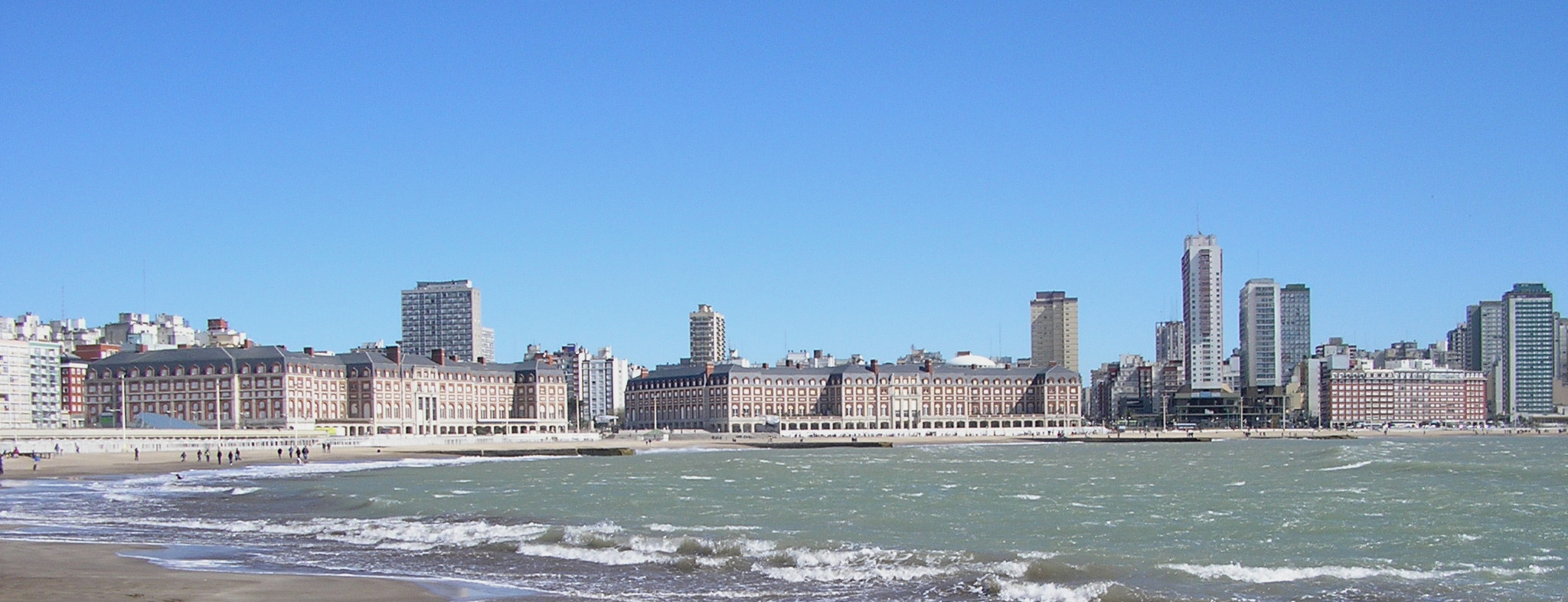
Panorama of Mar del Plata.

The National Sea Festival (Spanish: Fiesta Nacional del Mar) is a festival held annually at Mar del Plata, Argentina since 1910, during the month of February to celebrate the summer season. The event is organized by the municipal government since 1952, and it became a national festival in 1972.

== History ==
=== Timeline ===
- 1910: The festival was first held on 23 February 1910. The contest was participated in by 12 young girls, most of them daughters of local lifeguards and fishermen. The winner, however, was a 17-year-old teacher, Emilia Bonacci. Her princesses were Vicenta Carboni, Aida Garcia, Antonia Martinez, Basilia Martinez, Pilar Bordoni and Dolinda Carboni. The jury members were: Zelmira Gainza Paz, Otilia Alcorta de Rodriguez and Maria Demarchi Roca. The contest took place at the Odeón theater and the Queen and her princesses were paraded in a ship-shaped carriage with a length of 40 feet (12 m) and profusely illuminated. The procession walked across the town, escorted by young sailors carrying torches.
- 1932: After a lapse of 22 years, a new contest was held and the 19 years old Dora Lombardo won the crown among nine contenders.
- 1952: The continuity of the festival was compromised by the political situation in Argentina and abroad, but it was held again in 1952 with the support of the Municipal Agency of Tourism, and the winner of the contest was awarded the title of "Miss Mar del Plata". The recurrent crises in the country prevented the organization of the festival until 1967.
- 1967: That year the title of "Miss Mar del Plata" was replaced for that of "Provincial Queen of the Sea". The new venue was the Auditorium theater, and the newly elected Queen officially opened the summer season.

=== National Festival status since 1972 ===
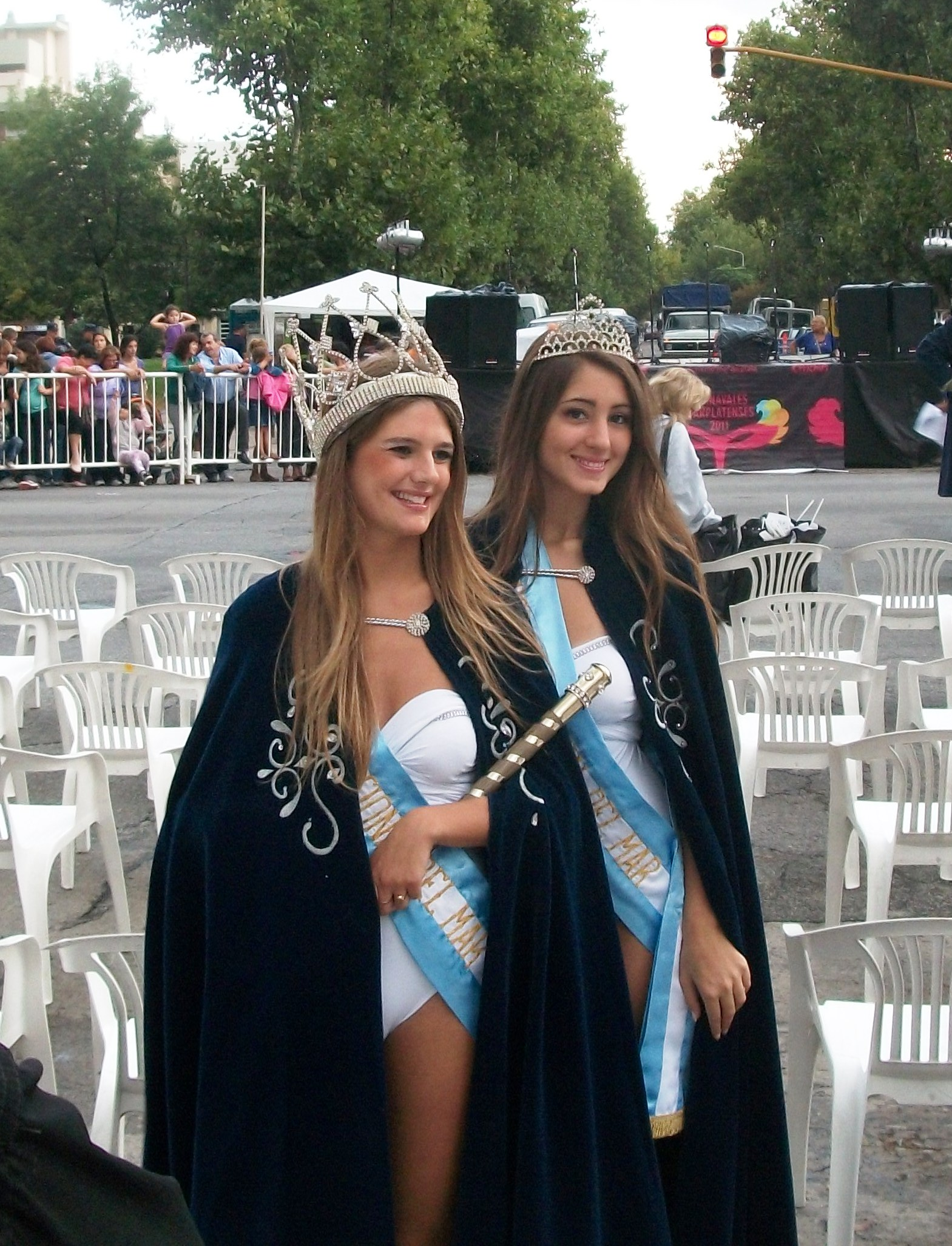
2011 Queen María Jimena Indurain and first Princess Antonella Scollo, just before a Carnival parade

The Federal Government grants the status of National Festival to the celebration since 1972. The National Festival is organized by the former Department of Tourism -today's Municipal Agency of Tourism. The event is televised throughout the country. The stages and places were the Festival takes place have changed through the decades: in 1972 the venue was the Club Naútico, an exclusive tennis and rowing club from where one of the top stars of the Argentine tennis came out to fame: Guillermo Vilas. Later, from 1973 and up to 1980 the festival was held at the Auditorium theater, the exception being 1979 when it took place in the Provincial hotel. Between 1981 and 1983, the chosen stage was the José María Minella Stadium. From 1984 to date, the show is represented at Las Toscas beach, an outdoor arena where thousands of tourists and residents gather to enjoy the festival. Like in 1910, the winner is elected among 12 local girls between 16 and 25 years old. Nowadays, the task of National Queen of the Sea implies more responsibilities than those of 1910, since during her period she acts as the main representative of the city of Mar del Plata in different regional and national events.

== See also ==
- Fiesta Nacional de la Vendimia
