= Villa Tulumaya =

- Town
- Location of Villa Tulumaya in Argentina
- Coordinates: 32°43′S 68°34′W
- Country: Argentina
- Province: Mendoza
- Department: Lavalle
- Elevation: 621 m (2,037 ft)

Population
  - Total: 7,005
- Demonym: tulumayense
- Time zone: UTC−3 (ART)
- CPA base: M5,664
- Dialing code: +54 261
- Climate: BWk

Villa Tulumaya is a town in Mendoza Province, Argentina. It is the head town of Lavalle Department.

The town was founded on October 20, 1853.
