= Tunuyán =

- City
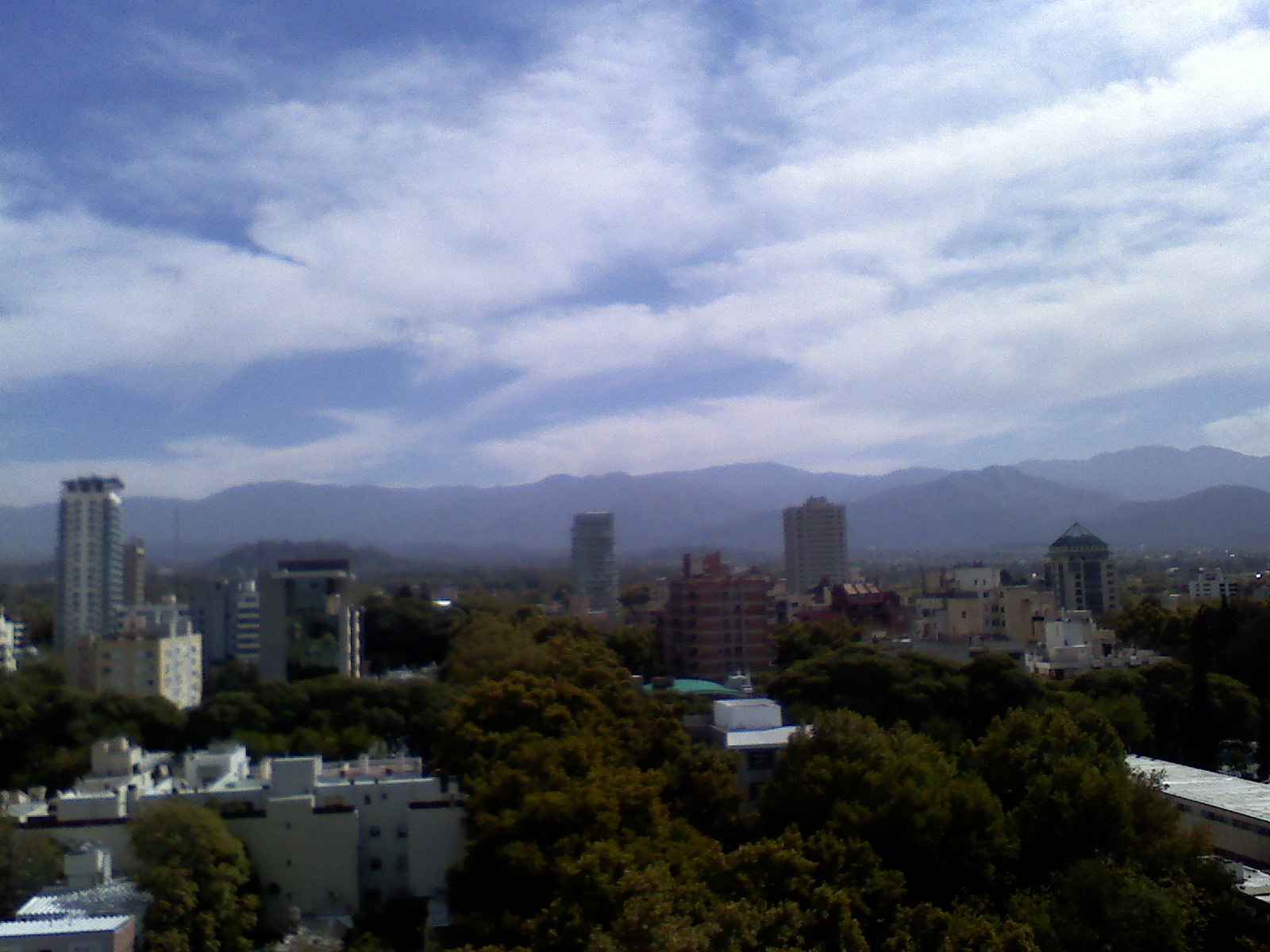

- Location of Tunuyán in Argentina
- Coordinates: 33°34′S 69°1′W
- Country: Argentina
- Province: Mendoza
- Department: Tunuyán
- Founded: November 25, 1880
- Elevation: 875 m (2,871 ft)

Population (2010 census)
  - Total: 49,132
- Time zone: UTC−3 (ART)
- CPA base: M5560
- Dialing code: +54 2622
- Climate: BSk
- Website: Official website

Tunuyán is a city in the west of the province of Mendoza, Argentina, located on the western shore of the Tunuyán River, 80 km (50 mi) south from the provincial capital Mendoza and 100 km (62 mi) east of the Chilean border. It has 49,132 inhabitants, and is the head town of the Tunuyán Department. Along with the Tupungato Department and the San Carlos Department it makes up the "Valle de Uco" region, which is famous in the Argentine wine industry for its important and modern vineyards and wineries. Investments since the millennium, attracted by the climate, soil, and altitude combination, have transformed the area, making it one of Argentina's most important regions when it comes to high-quality wine production and its associated connoisseur-driven enotourism.

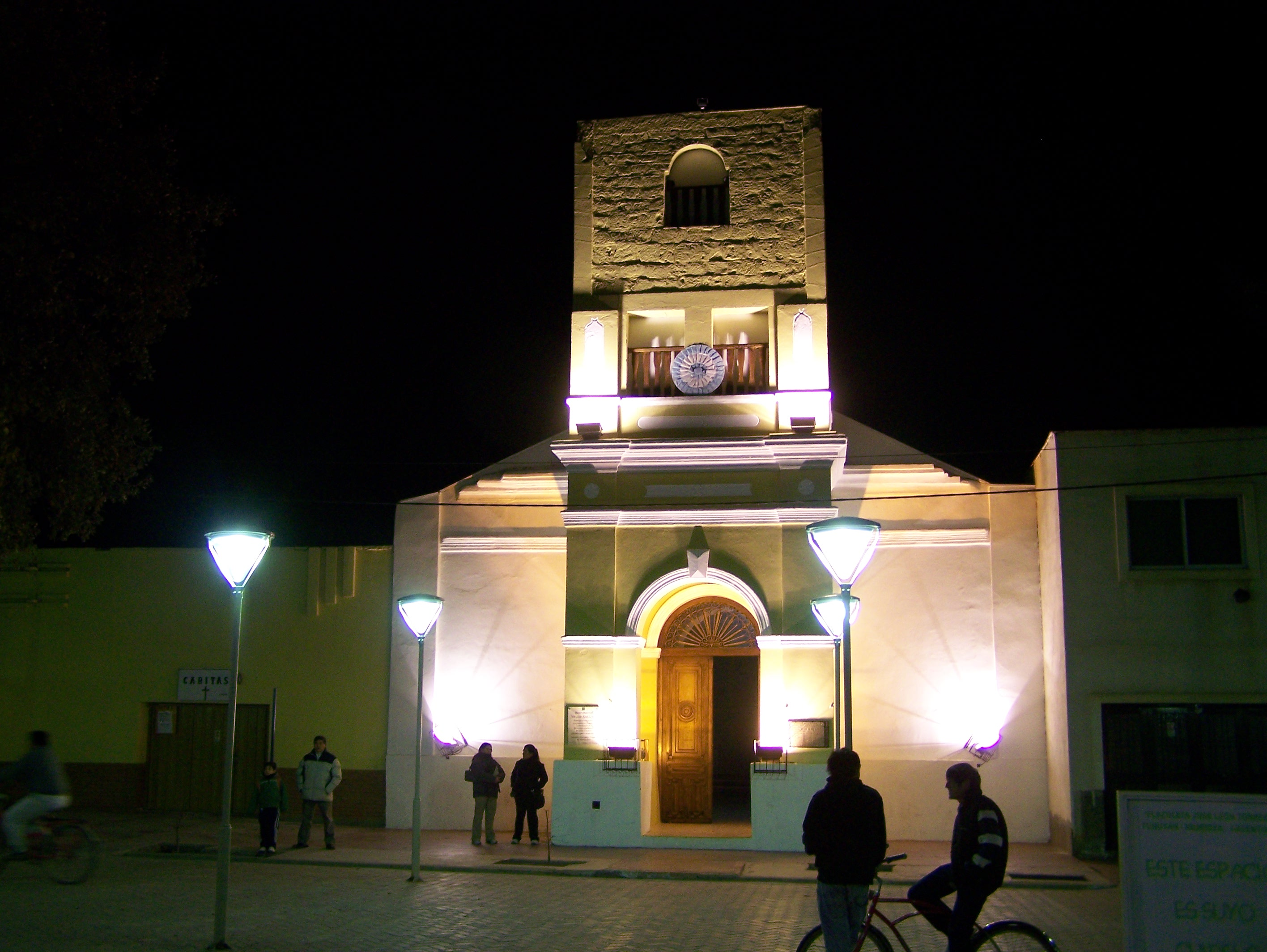
Tunuyán Church

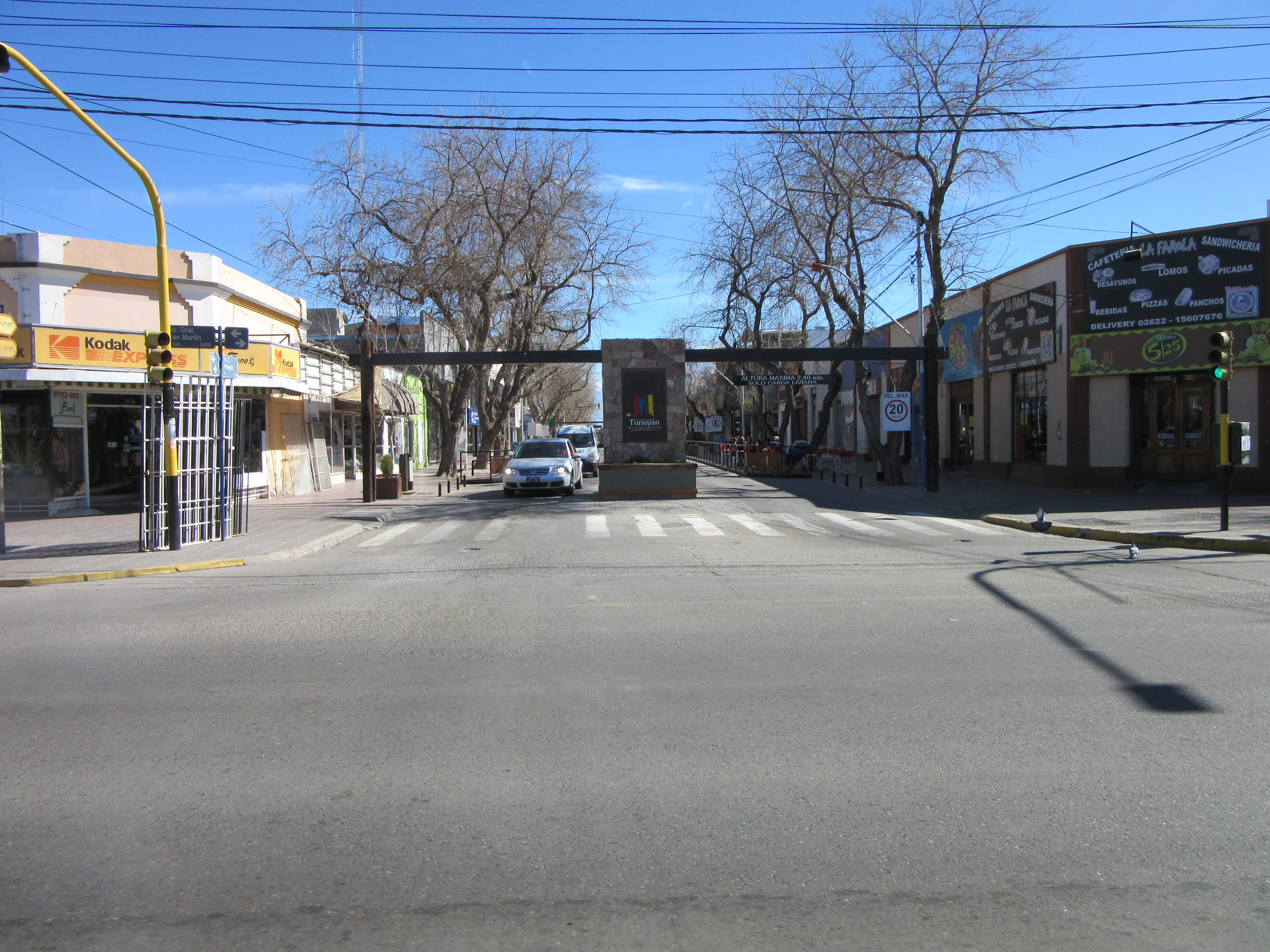
At-grade junction in Tunuyán downtown

== Notable people ==
- Carlos Alonso (born in Tunuyán)
- Nicolino Locche
