= Villa Nueva, Mendoza =

Villanueva
- City
- Location of Villanueva in Argentina
- Coordinates: 32°54′S 68°46′W
- Country: Argentina
- Province: Mendoza
- Department: Guaymallén

Population (2001 census)
  - Total: 11,104
- Time zone: UTC−3 (ART)
- CPA base: M5521
- Dialing code: +54 0261
- Climate: BWk

Villa Nueva is a small city located in the central part of the Mendoza Province. It is the capital of the Guaymallén Department as well as one of its 20 districts. It constitutes together with other cities the first metropolitan area of the province and the fourth of Argentina, called Greater Mendoza.
