= Rivadavia, Mendoza =

Rivadavia
- City
- Location of Rivadavia in Argentina
- Coordinates: 33°11′S 68°28′W
- Country: Argentina
- Province: Mendoza
- Department: Rivadavia
- Elevation: 659 m (2,162 ft)

Population (2010 census)
  - Total: 82,582
- Time zone: UTC-3 (ART)
- CPA base: M5577
- Dialing code: +54 2634
- Climate: BWk

Rivadavia is a city in the center-north of the province of Mendoza, Argentina. It has 52,567 inhabitants as per the 2001 census [INDEC], and is the head town of the Rivadavia Department. The city lies on the north bank of the Tunuyán River, downstream from the reservoir of the El Carrizal Dam, which is one of its tourist attractions.

Rivadavia is also known for attractions such as Rivadavia Canta al Pais, a large plaza downtown and many places for shopping.
