= Desaguadero, Argentina =

Desaguadero
- Municipality and village
- Location of Desaguadero in Argentina
- Coordinates: 33°24′10″S 67°09′20″W
- Country: Argentina
- Province: Mendoza; San Luis
- Department: La Paz Department, Mendoza; Juan Martín de Pueyrredón Department, San Luis

Population (2010 census)
  - Total: 520
- Time zone: UTC−3 (ART)
- CPA base: M5598

Desaguadero is a village and municipality in San Luis Province, straddling the province's border with Mendoza Province in central Argentina.

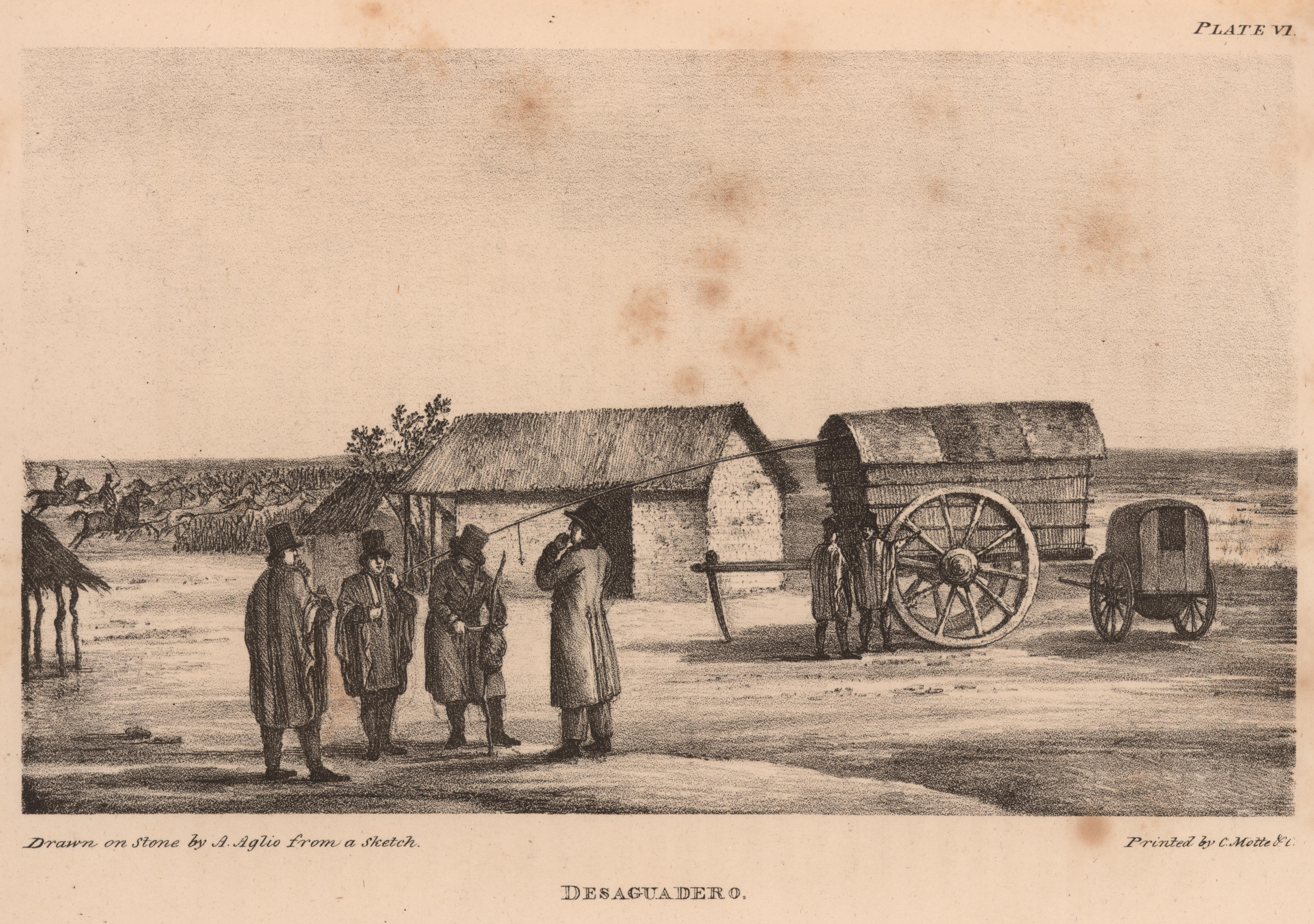
Post house in Desaguadero; lithograph by Agostino Aglio, 1824

== History ==
Desaguadero was one of the posts on the Camino Real del Oeste and through it passed the travelers from Buenos Aires heading to San Luis, Mendoza and Santiago de Chile. Peter Schmidtmeyer was one of the travelers who visited the town in the first half of the 19th century. In his book Viaje a Chile a través de los Andes (Journey to Chile through the Andes), published in London in 1824, he refers to his passage through it: “We crossed the desert, which is an ascending terrain with an extension of about fifty miles, without any water except a faint spring, sometimes dry, halfway, and after descending the gentle western slope of this place, we arrived at the post house of Desaguadero: a miserable dwelling, where a wooden grill with a piece of roasted meat and a picturesque resource of the peons made up for the lack of dishes. Near the ranches the river passes with a little water that for the most part is covered with reeds and inhabited by wild ducks, geese and swans ... ” Based on a sketch made on the spot, the Italian painter Agostino Aglio made a lithograph that illustrates this place, in which, in addition to the travelers who arrived at the post, one can see “the troop of horses that are led to the corral, where some will be chosen to cover the next stage; everyone is brought in so that they do not lose the habit of walking together”, as he explains.

== Climate ==
Climate data for Desaguadero, San Luis (2008–2020, extremes 2008–2020)
Month	Jan	Feb	Mar	Apr	May	Jun	Jul	Aug	Sep	Oct	Nov	Dec	Year
Record high °C (°F)	44.8 (112.6)	42.7 (108.9)	39.0 (102.2)	35.5 (95.9)	32.9 (91.2)	26.5 (79.7)	28.0 (82.4)	36.7 (98.1)	37.8 (100.0)	43.5 (110.3)	42.4 (108.3)	44.5 (112.1)	44.8 (112.6)
Mean daily maximum °C (°F)	35.3 (95.5)	33.1 (91.6)	30.6 (87.1)	25.7 (78.3)	20.7 (69.3)	17.5 (63.5)	17.1 (62.8)	21.1 (70.0)	24.1 (75.4)	27.7 (81.9)	31.8 (89.2)	34.5 (94.1)	26.6 (79.9)
Daily mean °C (°F)	27.3 (81.1)	25.3 (77.5)	22.7 (72.9)	17.9 (64.2)	12.9 (55.2)	8.6 (47.5)	7.9 (46.2)	11.6 (52.9)	15.3 (59.5)	19.3 (66.7)	23.4 (74.1)	26.2 (79.2)	18.2 (64.8)
Mean daily minimum °C (°F)	19.2 (66.6)	17.8 (64.0)	15.2 (59.4)	10.6 (51.1)	5.9 (42.6)	0.2 (32.4)	−0.6 (30.9)	2.2 (36.0)	6.3 (43.3)	10.6 (51.1)	15.0 (59.0)	17.6 (63.7)	10.0 (50.0)
Record low °C (°F)	8.1 (46.6)	5.5 (41.9)	−0.7 (30.7)	−3.4 (25.9)	−11.1 (12.0)	−9.8 (14.4)	−13.1 (8.4)	−10.8 (12.6)	−8.5 (16.7)	−3.6 (25.5)	−0.4 (31.3)	4.3 (39.7)	−13.1 (8.4)
Average precipitation mm (inches)	61.3 (2.41)	46.2 (1.82)	32.1 (1.26)	21.1 (0.83)	14.7 (0.58)	4.4 (0.17)	1.6 (0.06)	3.8 (0.15)	8.4 (0.33)	24.6 (0.97)	42.8 (1.69)	42.3 (1.67)	303.3 (11.94)
Source: San Luis Province
