= Rivadavia Department, Mendoza =

Rivadavia Departamento Rivadavia
- Department
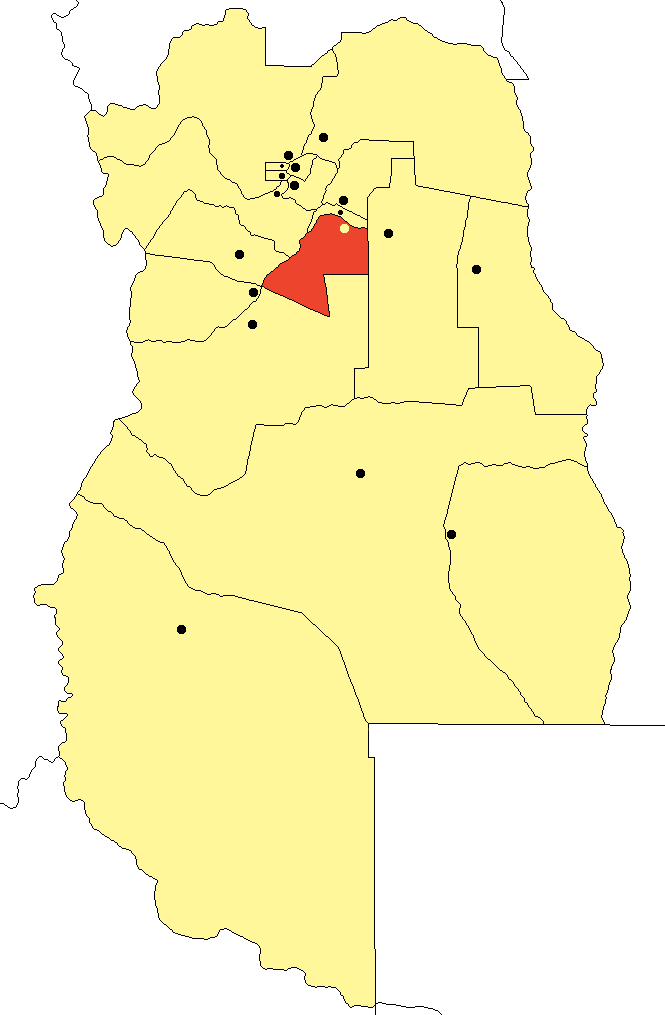
- location of Rivadavia Departmentin Mendoza Province
- Coordinates: 33°11′S 68°28′W
- Country: Argentina
- Established: April 18, 1884
- Seat: Rivadavia

Government
  - Intendant: Ricardo Mansur (Sembrar)

Area
  - Total: 2,141 km^{2} (827 sq mi)

Population (2022 census [INDEC])
  - Total: 63,724
  - Density: 29.76/km^{2} (77.09/sq mi)
- Demonym: rivadaviense
- Postal Code: M5577
- IFAM: MZA012
- Area Code: 02623
- Patron saint: ?
- Website: www.rivadaviamendoza.gov.ar

Rivadavia is a central department of Mendoza Province in Argentina.

The provincial subdivision has a population of about 52,500 inhabitants in an area of 2,141 km^{2} (827 sq mi), and its capital city is Rivadavia, which is located around 1,075 km (668 mi) from the Capital federal.

== Districts ==
- Andrade
- El Mirador
- La Central
- La Libertad
- Los Árboles
- Los Campamentos
- Los Huarpes
- Medrano
- Mundo Nuevo
- Reducción
- Rivadavia
- San Isidro

== Sport ==
The city of Rivadavia is home to Club Sportivo Independiente Rivadavia, a football club that play in the Argentine Primera División.
