= Mendoza Province =

Province of Argentina

Mendoza Provincia de Mendoza (Spanish)
- Province
- Province of Mendoza
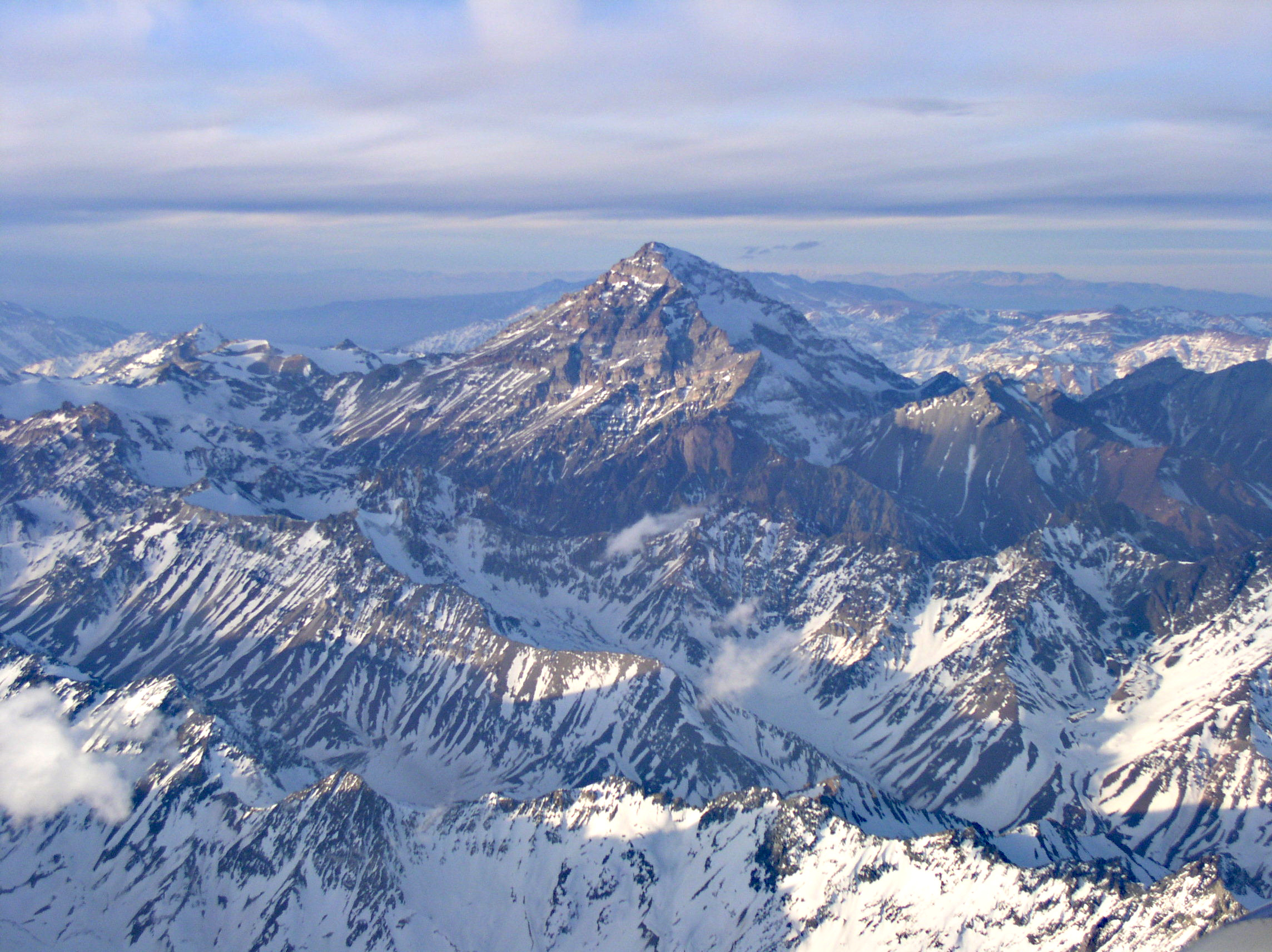
- Aconcagua, the highest mountain in the Americas

- Flag Coat of arms

- Location of Mendoza within Argentina
- Coordinates: 32°53′55″S 68°50′47″W
- Country: Argentina
- Capital: Mendoza
- Departments: 18
- Districts: 205

Government
  - Governor: Alfredo Cornejo (UCR)
  - Vice Governor: Hebe Casado
  - Deputies: 10
  - Senators: 3

Area Ranked 7th
  - Total: 148,827 km^{2} (57,462 sq mi)
- Elevation: 875 m (2,871 ft)

Population (2022 census)
  - Total: 2,014,533
  - Rank: 5th
  - Density: 13.5361/km^{2} (35.0583/sq mi)
- Demonym: mendocino

GDP
  - Total: peso 571 billion (US$12.2 billion) (2019)
- Time zone: UTC−3 (ART)
- ISO 3166 code: AR-M
- HDI (2021): 0.848 very high (6th)
- Website: www.mendoza.gov.ar

Mendoza (Spanish pronunciation: [menˈdosa]), officially the Province of Mendoza, is a province of Argentina, in the western central part of the country in the Cuyo region. It borders San Juan to the north, La Pampa and Neuquén to the south, San Luis to the east, and the republic of Chile to the west; the international limit is marked by the Andes mountain range. Its capital city is the homonymous city of Mendoza.

Covering an area of 148,827 km^{2}, it is the seventh biggest province of Argentina with 5.35% of the country's total area. The population for 2022 is 2,014,533 inhabitants, which makes it the fifth most populated region of the country, or 4.38% of the total national population.

== History ==
=== Pre-Columbian times ===
Archeological studies have determined that the first inhabitants in the area date from the Holocene, but there are few remains of those people to know their habits. The earliest sites of human occupation in Mendoza Province, Agua de la Cueva and Gruta del Indio, are 12,000–13,000 years old. In the basins of the Atuel River, in 300 BC, lived a group of people that lived via hunting and the cultivation of maize, pumpkins and beans. Those valleys saw the rise of the Agrelo culture, ancestor of the Huarpes. They were later influenced greatly by the Inca empire during the 15th century.

=== Spanish colony (1550–1810) ===
The first Spanish conquerors came around 1550, from the Viceroyalty of Peru. In 1561, Mendoza was founded by the conquistador Pedro del Castillo. Until the creation of the Viceroyalty of the Río de la Plata in 1776, the area of what is now Mendoza Province belonged to the Captaincy General of Chile.

=== Independence ===
With the creation of the Viceroyalty of the Río de la Plata, its 30,000 inhabitants became part of the intendency of Cuyo de Córdoba del Tucumán, but in 1813, the intendency was separated and the Province of Cuyo created, with José de San Martín as its first Governor. He received important support from Mendoza when he led his Army of the Andes from Plumerillo to the 1817 crossing of the Andes, in his campaign to end Spanish rule in Chile.

=== 19th century ===
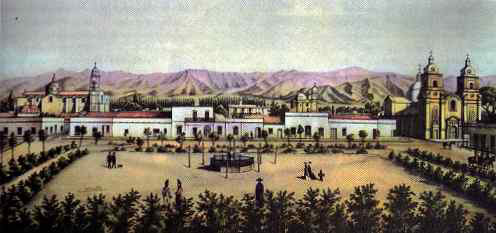
View (looking West) from the Cabildo in the city of Mendoza, prior to the great quake of 1861

The Province of Cuyo was ultimately divided in 1820, and Mendoza parted ways with San Luis and San Juan Provinces.

The 1861 earthquake nearly destroyed the city of Mendoza, which had to be almost entirely reconstructed. In 1885, railways were built to the province, allowing for easy transport of the region's wines to the country's trade hub of Buenos Aires.

Following the development of the wine industry in the province around 1900, Mendoza began to grow quickly, attracting tens of thousands of European immigrants, particularly Spaniards. In 1939, the National University of Cuyo, one of the more important universities of the country, was founded in the province.

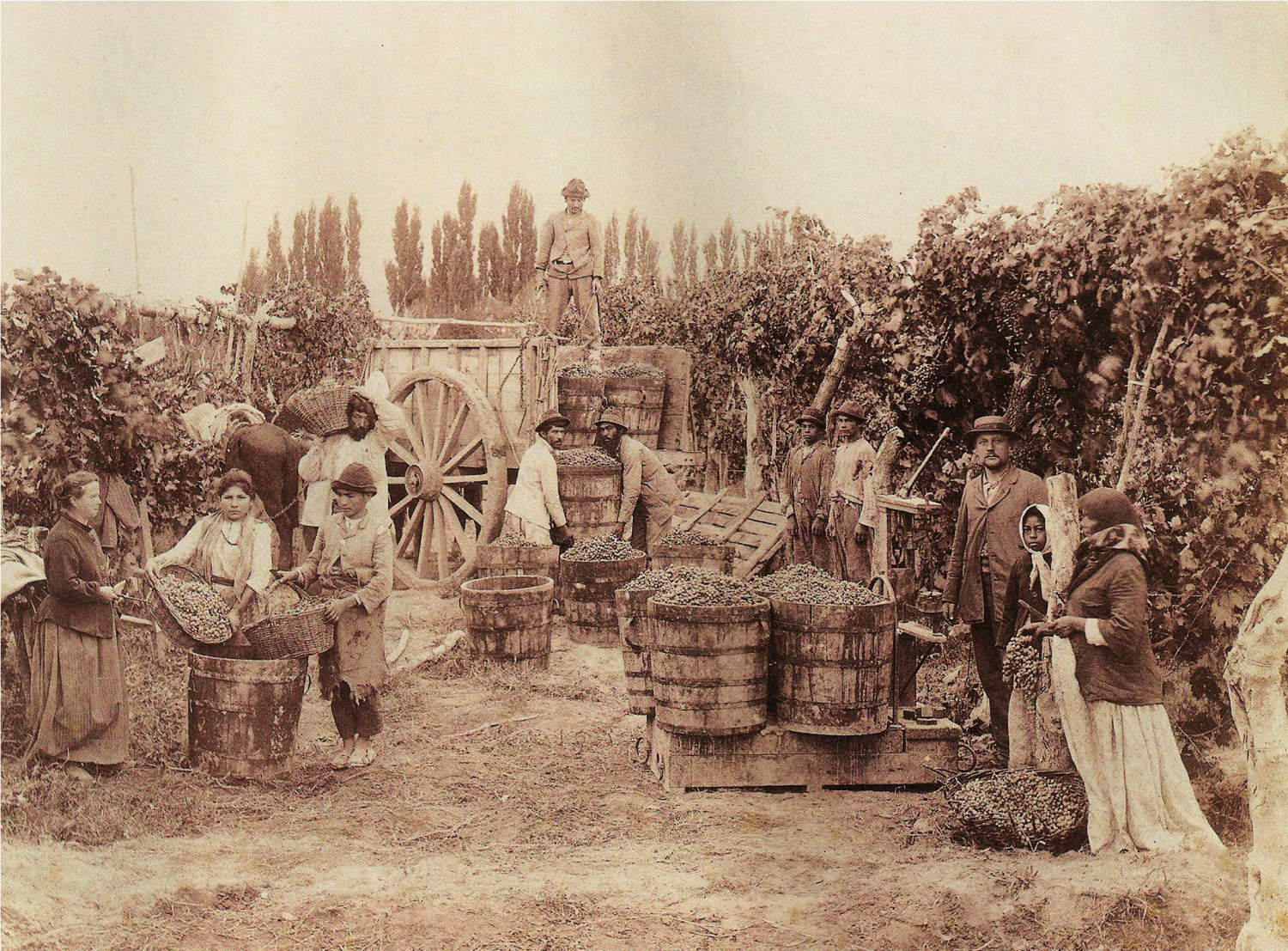
Mendoza grape harvest, circa 1890

=== 20th century ===
Partly in reaction to President Juan Perón's populist policies, some of which taxed agriculture heavily to finance urban development and public works, Mendoza landowners formed the conservative Democratic Party, which secured the Vice Governor's post in 1958. Increasing their presence in the Mendoza Legislature, the Democrats became an obstacle to progressive Governor Ernesto Ueltschi, an ally of president Arturo Frondizi's. With majorities in both houses by 1961, they had Gov. Ueltschi removed and Democrat Vice-governor Francisco Gabrielli appointed in his stead. Elected governor in his own right in 1963, Gov. Gabrielli was deposed following the June 1966 coup against President Arturo Illia; but still benefiting from conservative credentials, he was appointed de facto governor by the same military regime in 1970.

In contrast to the pragmatism that had distinguished his 1963–66 term, Gabrielli governed with a hard line, freezing state salaries and ordering large utility rate increases, used the Mendoza police to repress dissent and took foreign policy prerogatives like collaborating with Chilean saboteurs opposed to their country's new Marxist president, Salvador Allende. These events came to a head in April 1972, however, when violent protests forced the newly unpopular Gabrielli to resign.

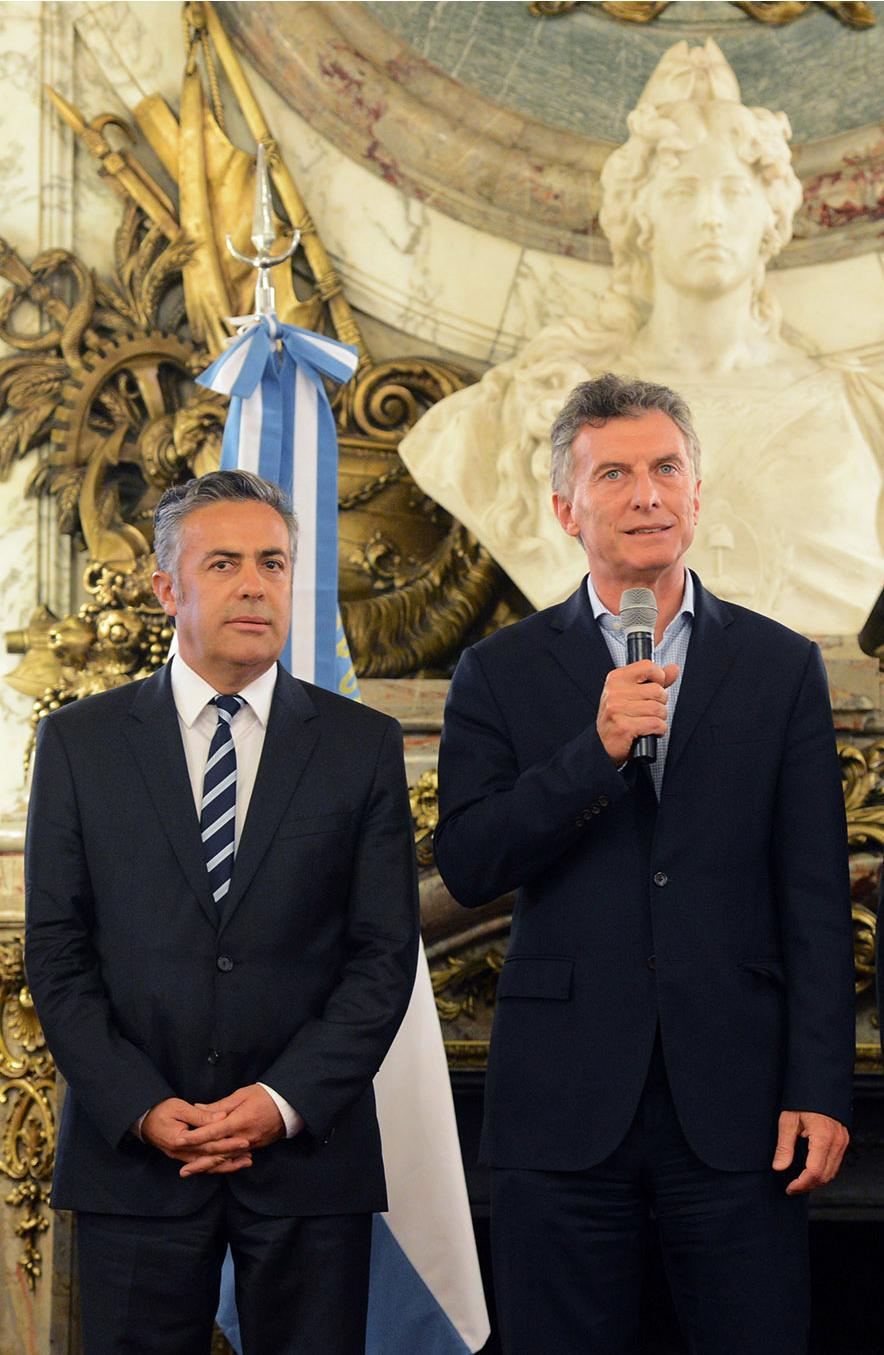
Governor Alfredo Cornejo (left) and ex-president Mauricio Macri (right)

Upon the return to democracy in March 1973, Mendoza voters turned to a left-leaning Peronist, Alberto Martínez Baca. Quickly enacting needed labor and land reforms, Martínez Baca, however, made the mistake of appointing affiliates of the extreme-left Montoneros movement, an organization whose armed wing had perpetrated a string of violent crimes since 1970 (and would continue to do so). Alarmed by this move from the otherwise pragmatic Martínez Baca, President Perón had him removed in June 1974.

Becoming more politically independent-minded following these two disappointments, Mendoza voters elected centrist Radical Civic Union as well as populist Justicialist Party lawmakers since Argentina's return to democracy in 1983. Though Mendoza has generally prospered since then, its critical wine industry was left reeling from the 1983 collapse of state-owned vintner Bodegas GIOL, whose dictatorship-era receivers had run the wine conglomerate (then the world's largest outside Europe), and accumulated over US$6 billion of debt; GIOL closed in 1991.

Elected in 2003, Radical Civic Union Governor Julio Cobos highlighted this independent sentiment by parting ways with many in his party and endorsing newly elected Peronist President Néstor Kirchner's policies in 2004. Over the opposition of his party, Cobos accepted the post of running mate to first lady Cristina Fernández de Kirchner of the ruling Front for Victory, in the presidential elections of October 2007. Fernández and Cobos won in the first round, and Cobos became Vice President of Argentina; he was replaced by pro-Kirchner Justicialist candidate Celso Jaque as governor. The province is represented by three senators in the Argentine Senate, currently María Perceval, Ernesto Sanz and Mónica Troadello. Mendoza is represented by 10 deputies in the Argentine Chamber of Deputies.

On 16 July 2008, Vice President Cobos stunned observers by casting the tie-breaking vote against a presidentially-sponsored measure in the Senate that would have raised export taxes on an array of agricultural goods. His faction of the UCR won a significant victory in the 2009 mid-term elections in Mendoza.

== Geography ==
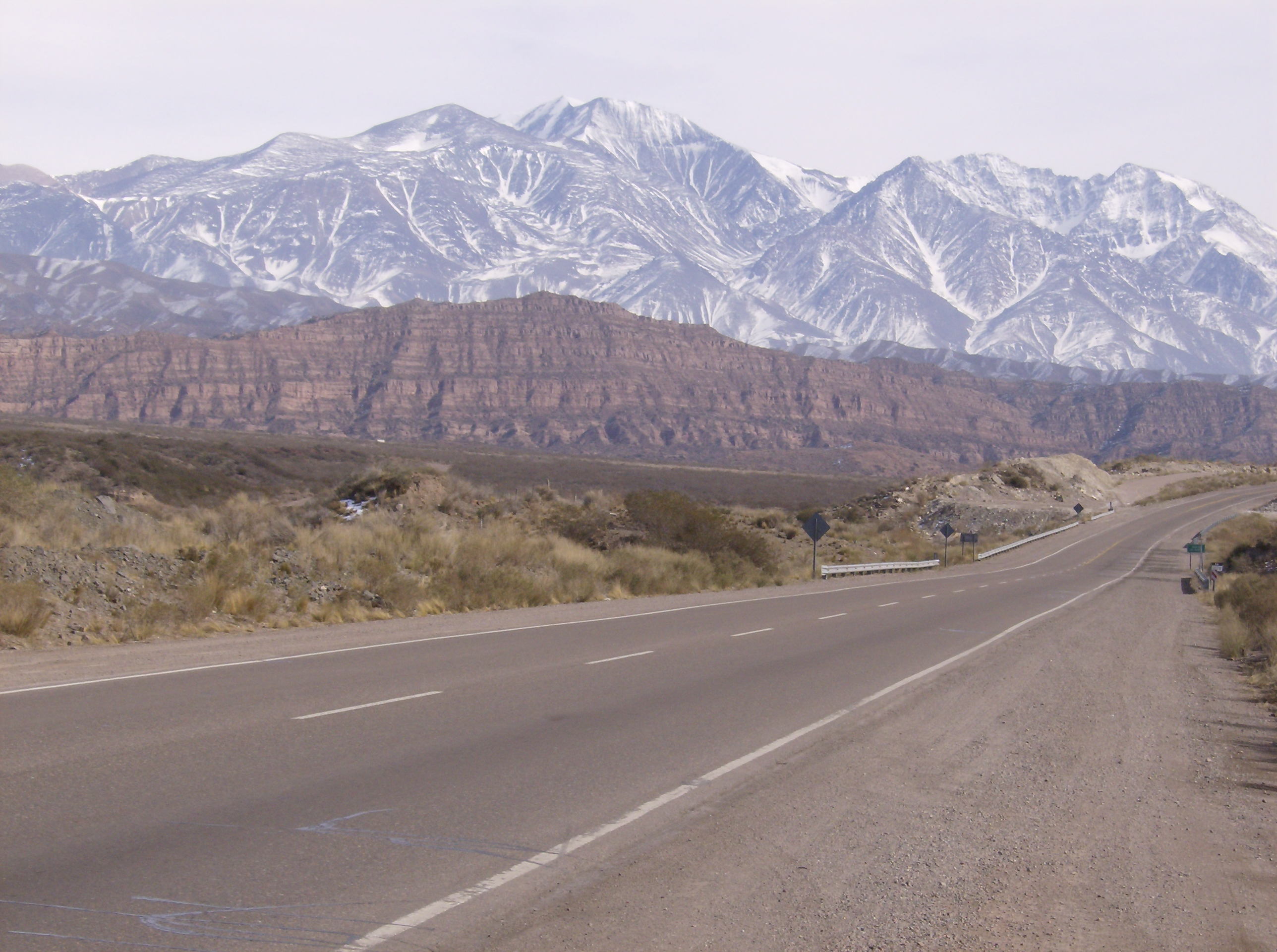
The snowy Andes viewed from the National Route 7

The geography of the province descends from 6,960.8 metres (22,837 ft) at the summit of Aconcagua to the semi-flat lands of the east. A series of longitudinal valles, such as the Uspallata, separate the Andes from the Precordillera lower mountains. To the east, the Cuyean plains are crossed by tributaries of the Desaguadero River. Other important rivers include Mendoza River, Tunuyán River, Diamante River and Atuel River.

The climate is continental, sunny and dry in the entire territory of the province, with warm summers and relatively cold winters. The arid soil due to the scant precipitation and the great temperature difference between day and night allows mainly xerophytes and few trees to grow. The annual precipitation lies between 150 and 350mm, and hail is a significant, and not uncommon, problem in the regional viticulture. There are fertile lands surrounding the basins of the many rivers born in the glaciers of the Cordillera.

Köppen climate map of Mendoza Province, Argentina

The lowlands have very hot summers (30 °C to 33 °C during the day, or 86 °F to 91 °F) with warm nights in the north (18 °C, or 64 °F) and cooler evenings in the south (15 °C, 59 °F). Precipitation falls mainly as very scarce, but often severe thunderstorms that bring hail and high winds. Falls are pleasant and dry, and winters are cool with daytime highs around 14 °C (57 °F) and nighttime lows of 2 °C (35F). When Zonda winds blow downslope from the Andes, temperatures may soar to 30 °C (86 °F); however, Pampero winds can keep day temperatures below 5 °C (41 °F) and nighttime lows of −8 °C (18 °F) can be recorded. Snow is uncommon in the north, and occasional in the south.

The area around Malargue is located at higher elevation (1400 meters) and thus the weather is significantly colder: summers average 28 °C (82 °F) during the day, but only 11 °C (53F) at night, and winters range from 10 °C (50 °F) to −2 °C (28 °F). Here, precipitation is somewhat higher (350 mm) and winter is stormier than the summer, with 45 mm (1.8 in) falling in July. Snow is much more common, and falls several times every year: on occasion, it can be heavy. Temperatures often fall to −12 °C (10 °F) and up to −23 °C (-9 °F) have been recorded.

The first slopes of the Andes are dry and sunny; however, precipitation increases as one approaches the border with Chile, especially toward the south, where some areas receive over 600 mm (24 in), falling exclusively in the winter, and mostly as snow. Altitudes over 2,600 m in the north and over 2,000 m in the far south usually have ample snow cover. Summer days may be warm and sunny, but nights are always cold, whereas winter temperatures tend to be moderate, with long stretches of sunny (but very windy) weather alternating with very intense snowstorms where several meters of snow may pile up, providing excellent skiing conditions in resorts like Las Lenas, Penitentes and Vallecitos. Mountains often surpass 5,000 meters, and Aconcagua reaches 6,959 meters: at these altitudes, the climate is extremely cold and windy year round, with temperatures down to −40 °C.

Different wind fronts affect the landscape, mainly the Zonda wind, but also the mild Pampero, the warm Viento Norte and, in winter, the very rare Sudestada from the Southeast. The latter wind mostly affects the pampas.

== Economy ==
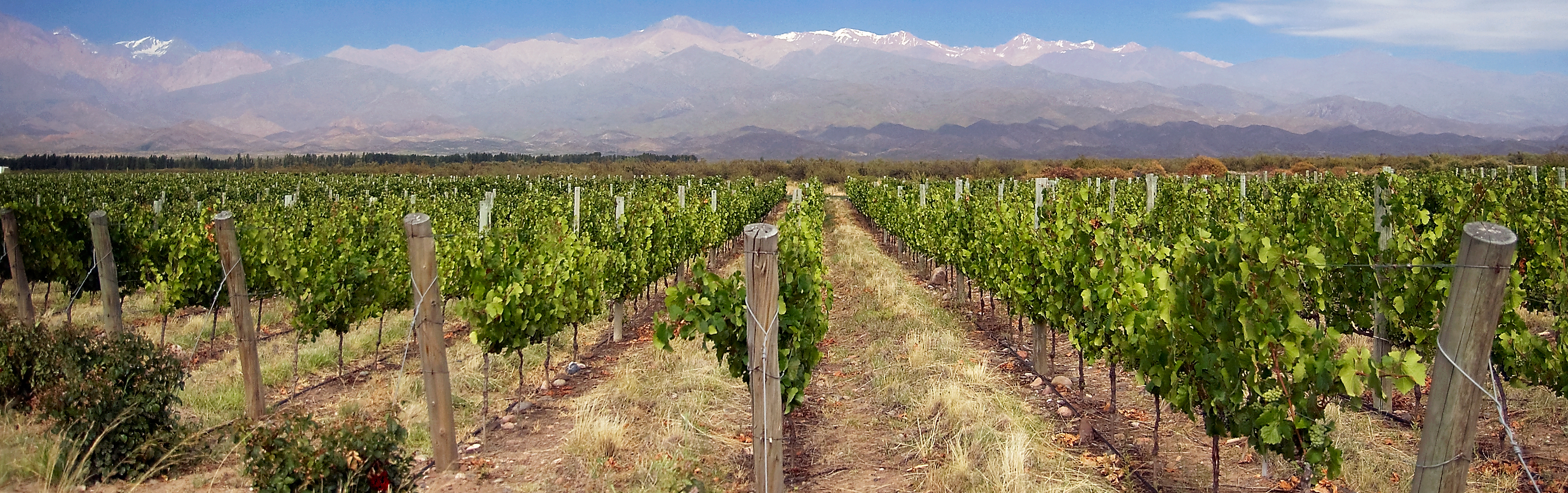
Vineyard under the Andes

Famed worldwide for its viticulture (with 70% of the 1.5 billion liters in Argentine wine production), the Mendoza economy (Argentina's fifth largest) is, however, quite diversified. Its 2013 output was estimated at US$18.8 billion, or, US$10,758 per capita below the national average, at a level similar to Turkey and above Mexico. Agriculture, to be sure (though 7% of the total economy), has long accounted for much of Mendoza's foreign exchange earnings (followed closely by tourism, mainly from Chile). Besides wine, other important crops (mainly for the Argentine market) are apples, pears, tomatoes, onions, plums, olives, cherries, peaches and quince. Apiculture, with 30,000 beehives, is another growing activity favoured by Mendoza's dry weather.

Mining is important to the Mendoza economy and has grown sharply in recent years, now accounting for 22% of output in 2005 (nearly 5 times the national average). Fourteen percent of the national reserves of petroleum are in Mendoza, also home to large-scale mining of lime and uranium. Manufacturing has long contributed to the province's prosperity and still accounts for 16% of the economy. Mendoza's main industries are, of course, wine production with 1,200 wineries turning out 1.1 billion liters in 2005, followed by canned fruits, a large petroleum refinery (in Luján de Cuyo), cement and others.

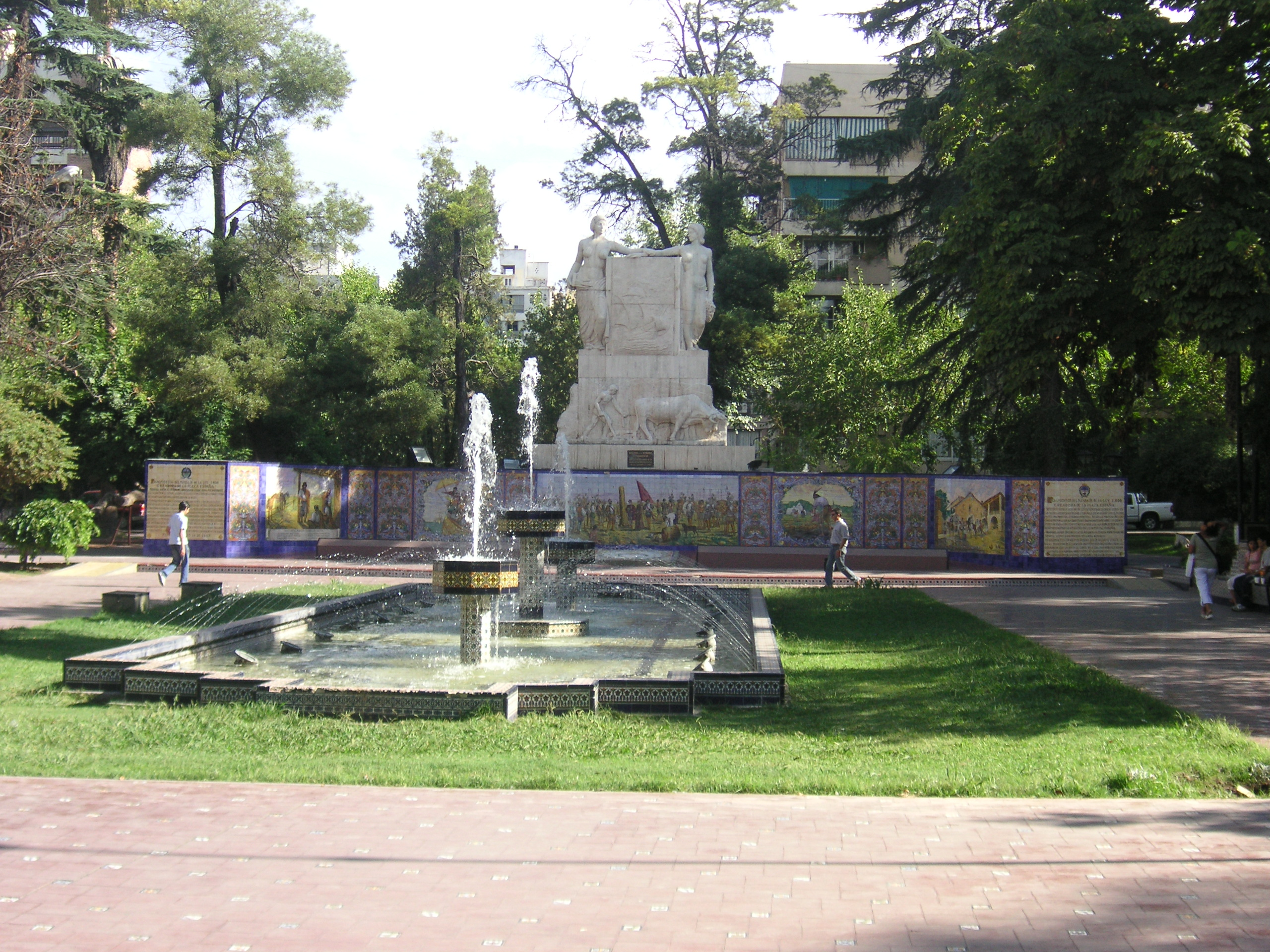
Spain Plaza, Mendoza. The province attracted tens of thousands of Spaniards, around 1900.

Mendoza's services sector is somewhat less developed and diversified than the national average. Tourism, long active in the scenic province, has, since the 2002 devaluation of the Argentine peso, become one of its most important sources of income, with around 700,000 visitors per year. The main attractions are the Las Leñas ski centre, the Aconcagua mountain, and the provincial parks of the Atuel Canyon, Puente del Inca and others. With the recent developments in Argentine wine production, enotourism has also become very popular, with numerous wine-tourism oriented hotels appearing throughout the province. Wineries along the wine route generally offer free tours of the premises with wine-tastings at the conclusion of the tour. In the wine-producing region, the Fiesta de la Vendimia (grape harvest festival) receives many visitors in late February or early March. The Christ the Redeemer of the Andes statue in the mountains on the Chilean border is a destination for many excursions.

== Government ==
The provincial government is divided into the usual three branches: the executive, headed by a popularly elected governor, who appoints the cabinet; the legislative; and the judiciary, headed by the Supreme Court. The legislative branch is a bicameral body composed of the Chamber of Deputies and the Senate. The Legislature is charged with introducing and passing local laws.

The Constitution of Mendoza Province forms the formal law of the province.

In Argentina, the most important law enforcement organization is the Argentine Federal Police but the additional work is carried out by the Mendoza Provincial Police.

== Political division ==
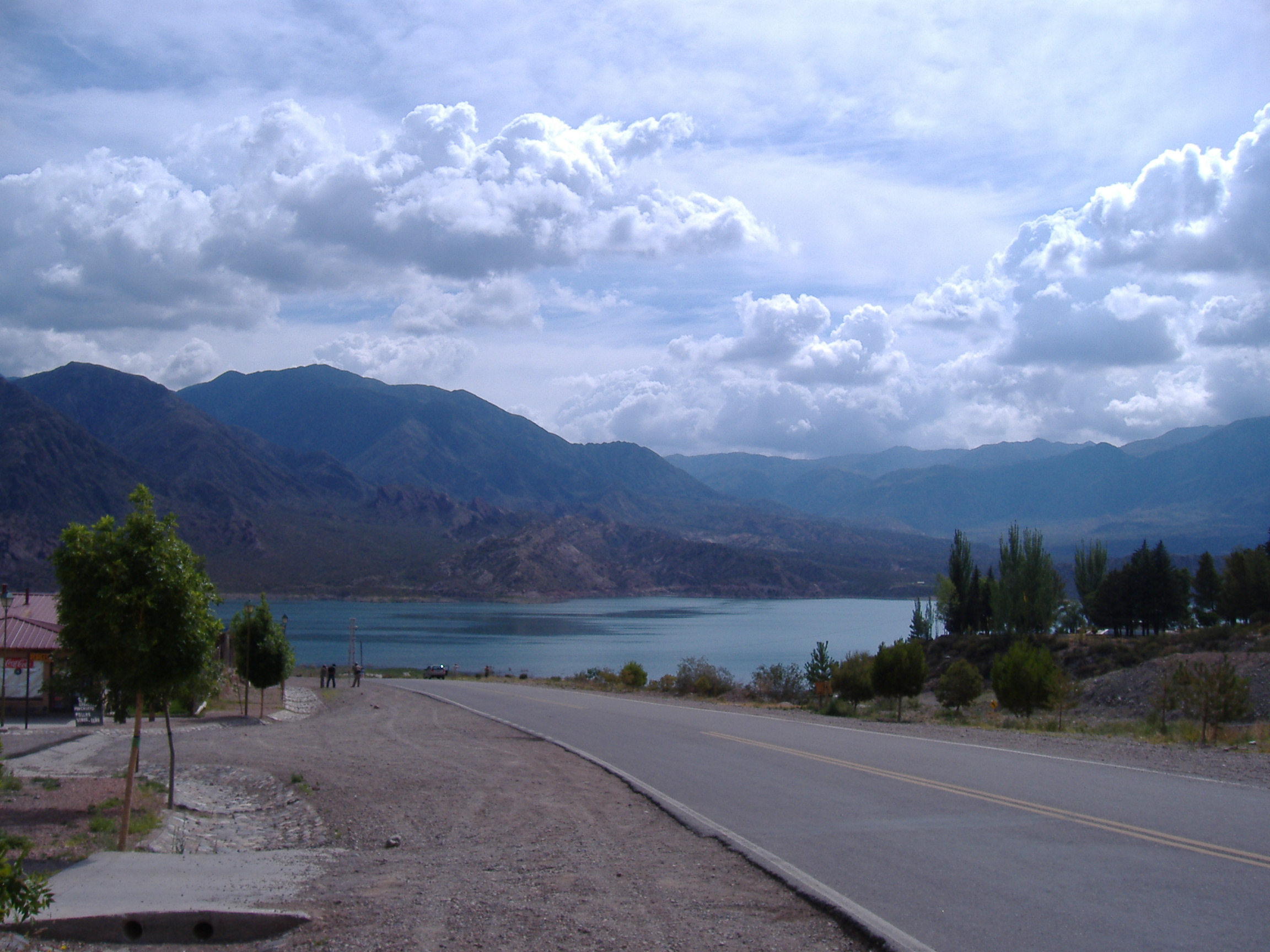
Potrerillos Reservoir, Lujan de Cuyo

The province is divided into 18 local government areas called departments (Spanish: departamentos). Each is divided into one or more districts, and has an Executive Department (led by a mayor or intendente) and a Deliberative Department (legislature) to run local services. The mayor is elected by a simple majority of the popular vote every four years, while half of the Deliberative body is renewed every two years (re-election is allowed in both cases). The departments can make regulations in accordance with the provincial constitution and the Organic Law of Municipalities, but financially cannot levy taxes, but only charge for services. The most populous cities within a department may have citizens' committees appointed by the municipal government to perform certain functions.

- Capital Department (Mendoza) - Capital
- General Alvear Department (General Alvear)
- Godoy Cruz Department (Godoy Cruz)
- Guaymallén Department (Villa Nueva)
- Junín Department (Junín)
- La Paz Department (La Paz)
- Las Heras Department (Las Heras)
- Lavalle Department (Villa Tulumaya)
- Luján de Cuyo Department (Luján de Cuyo)
- Maipú Department (Maipú)
- Malargüe Department (Malargüe)
- Rivadavia Department (Rivadavia)
- San Carlos Department (San Carlos)
- San Martín Department (San Martín)
- San Rafael Department (San Rafael)
- Santa Rosa Department (Santa Rosa)
- Tunuyán Department (Tunuyán)
- Tupungato Department (Tupungato)

== Villages ==
- Desaguadero

== See also ==
- Cuyo Spanish
- El Challao
- List of earthquakes in Mendoza Province
- Universidad Nacional de Cuyo
