= San Carlos Department, Mendoza =

San Carlos Departamento San Carlos
- Department
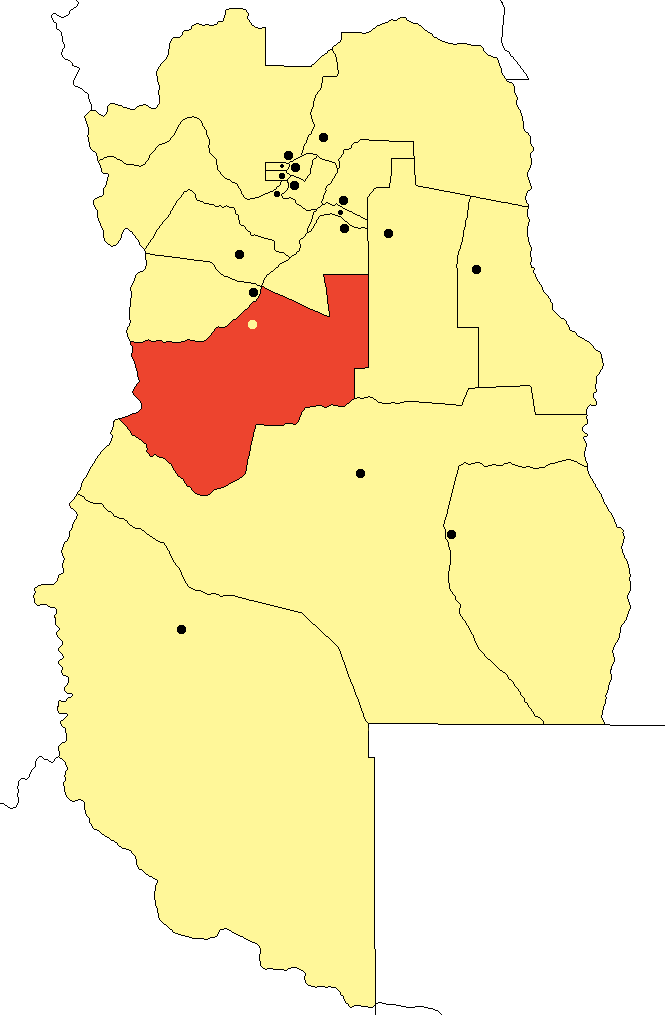
- location of San Carlos Department in Mendoza Province
- Coordinates: 33°46′S 69°02′W
- Country: Argentina
- Established: November 4, 1772
- Founder: ?
- Seat: San Carlos

Government
  - Intendant: Alejandro Morillas

Area
  - Total: 11,578 km^{2} (4,470 sq mi)

Population (2022 census [INDEC])
  - Total: 39,869
  - Density: 3.4435/km^{2} (8.9187/sq mi)
- Demonym: sancarlino/a
- Postal Code: M5569
- IFAM: MZA013
- Area Code: 02622
- Patron saint: ?
- Website: no

San Carlos is a western department of Mendoza Province in Argentina.

The provincial subdivision has a population of about 28,000 inhabitants in an area of 11,578 km^{2} (4,470 sq mi), and its capital city is San Carlos, which is located around 1,200 km (750 mi) from the Capital federal.

== Districts ==
- Chilecito
- Eugenio Bustos
- La Consulta
- Pareditas
- San Carlos
