= San Martín Department, Mendoza =

San Martín Departamento San Martín
- Department
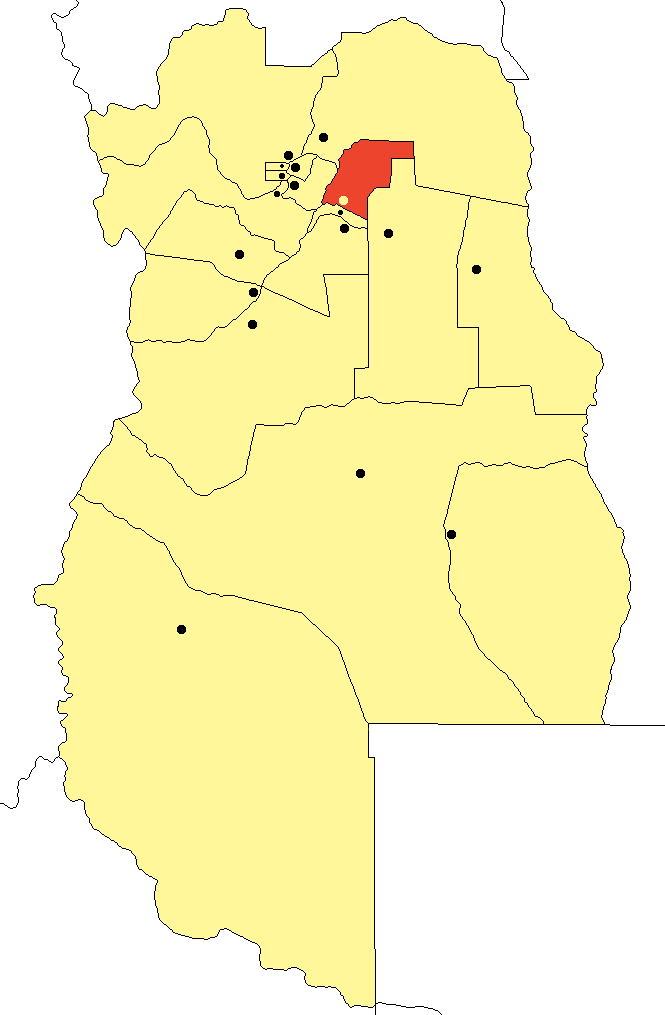
- location of San Martín Department in Mendoza Province
- Coordinates: 33°04′S 68°19′W
- Country: Argentina
- Established: December 20, 1816
- Founder: ?
- Seat: San Martín

Government
  - Intendant: Raúl Rufeil

Area
  - Total: 1,504 km^{2} (581 sq mi)

Population (2022 census [INDEC])
  - Total: 139,792
  - Density: 92.95/km^{2} (240.7/sq mi)
- Demonym: sanmartiniano/a
- Postal Code: M5570
- IFAM: MZA014
- Area Code: 0263
- Patron saint: ?
- Website: www.sanmartin.mendoza.gov.ar

San Martín is a department located in the centre of Mendoza Province in Argentina.

The provincial subdivision has a population of about 108,500 inhabitants in an area of 1,504 km^{2} (581 sq mi), and its capital city is San Martín, which is located around 1,100 km (680 mi) from the Capital federal.

== Name ==
The department and its cabecera (capital) are named in honour of General San Martín (1778–1850), the military leader that led the Argentine forces to victory over the Spanish Empire during the Argentine War of Independence.

== Districts ==
- Alto Salvador
- Alto Verde
- Buen Orden
- Chapanay
- Chivilcoy, Mendoza
- El Central
- El Divisadero, Mendoza
- El Espino
- El Ramblón
- Las Chimbas
- Montecaseros
- Nueva California
- Palmira, Mendoza
- San Martín
- Tres Porteñas

== Sport ==
The city of San Martín is home to Atlético Club San Martín, a football club currently playing in the regionalised 4th Division.
