= San Carlos, Mendoza =

San Carlos
- Town
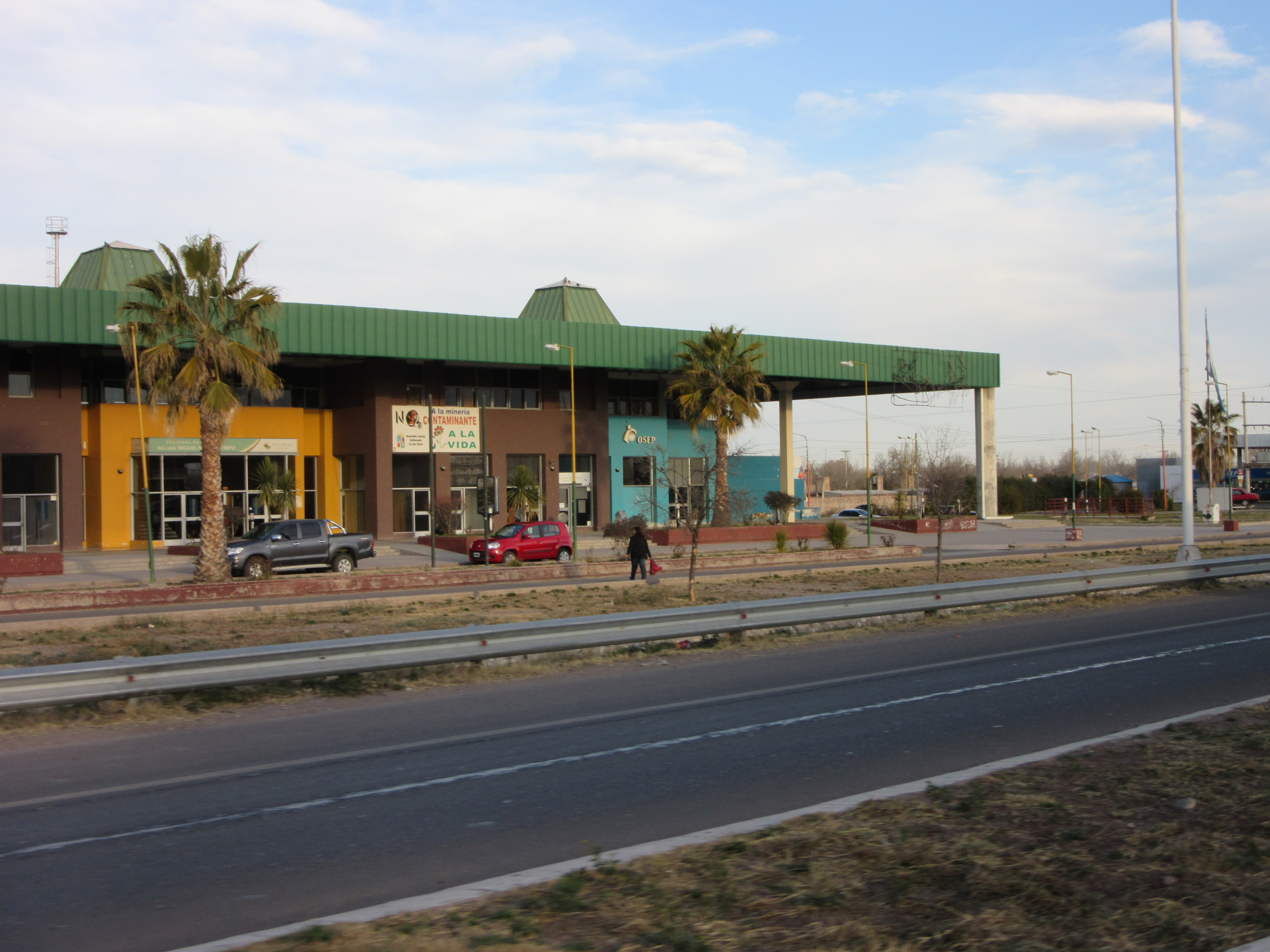

- Location of San Carlos in Argentina
- Coordinates: 33°46′S 69°02′W
- Country: Argentina
- Province: Mendoza
- Department: San Carlos
- Elevation: 929 m (3,048 ft)

Population
  - Total: 2,714
- Time zone: UTC−3 (ART)
- CPA base: M5567
- Dialing code: +54 2622
- Climate: BSk

San Carlos or Villa San Carlos is a town in Mendoza Province, Argentina. It is the head town of San Carlos Department

== Notable people ==
- Alfredo Cornejo, governor of the province
- Hugo Corro world Middleweight champion boxer
