= San Martín, Mendoza =

San Martín
- City
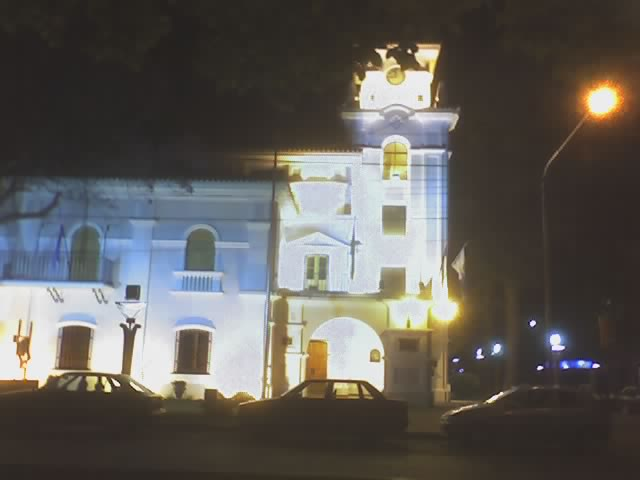
- City Hall San Martín

- Location of San Martín in Argentina
- Coordinates: 33°04′50″S 68°28′14″W
- Country: Argentina
- Province: Mendoza
- Department: San Martín
- Founded: December 20, 1816
- Founder: Toribio de Luzuriaga (Governor of Mendoza)

Government
  - Intendant: Raúl Rufeil

Area
  - Total: 1,504 km^{2} (581 sq mi)
- Elevation: 770 m (2,530 ft)

Population (2010 census)
  - Total: 79,476
  - Density: 52.84/km^{2} (136.9/sq mi)
- Time zone: UTC−3 (ART)
- CPA base: M5570
- Dialing code: +54 263
- Climate: BWk

San Martín is a city in the north-center part of the Mendoza Province in Argentina. It is the capital of the San Martín Department and constitutes, with Palmira and La Colonia, the third-largest metropolitan area in the province.

== History ==
The first San Martín inhabitants were the Huarpe Milkayak people. The territory was governed by the tribal chief called Pallamay until 1563, when the first Europeans under the command of the Captain Pedro Moyano Cornejo, arrived to the area.

The city was known as Rodeo de Moyano or, alternatively, as La Reducción (Spanish: The Reduction); but its name was changed to Villa Los Barriales in 1816, when it was included in the Corocorto Priesthood of Mendoza Province and officially established by the Governor of Mendoza, Toribio de Luzuriaga.

San Martín came into prominence in the war of the Argentine independence period, when José de San Martín received an extensive land grant in the area to take advantage of agriculture and help the Chilean army of Bernardo O'Higgins in an effort to prevent new Spanish invasions from Chile to Argentina. In 1823, the governor Pedro Molina changed the name of the city yet again in homage to the Argentine general José de San Martín, who, besides his inestimable historical role, contributed many innovations to the local farming sector and in viticulture, particularly.

In 1885, the first railway arrived in San Martin, uniting Buenos Aires with Mendoza and Chile. This development brought many Italian immigrants to the area from Buenos Aires; during the 1950s and '60s, National Route 7 was built between Buenos Aires and Mendoza Province, converting the city into an important distribution center along the most important highway between Buenos Aires and Santiago, Chile.

== Geography ==
=== Climate ===
Climate data for San Martín, Mendoza (1991–2020, extremes 1961–present)
Month	Jan	Feb	Mar	Apr	May	Jun	Jul	Aug	Sep	Oct	Nov	Dec	Year
Record high °C (°F)	42.7 (108.9)	42.7 (108.9)	37.8 (100.0)	33.6 (92.5)	31.6 (88.9)	30.1 (86.2)	32.1 (89.8)	33.5 (92.3)	36.5 (97.7)	40.4 (104.7)	40.5 (104.9)	43.3 (109.9)	43.3 (109.9)
Mean daily maximum °C (°F)	32.9 (91.2)	31.2 (88.2)	28.5 (83.3)	23.6 (74.5)	19.2 (66.6)	16.2 (61.2)	15.8 (60.4)	19.0 (66.2)	22.2 (72.0)	25.9 (78.6)	29.4 (84.9)	32.2 (90.0)	24.7 (76.5)
Daily mean °C (°F)	25.2 (77.4)	23.5 (74.3)	20.9 (69.6)	15.9 (60.6)	11.7 (53.1)	8.4 (47.1)	7.6 (45.7)	10.4 (50.7)	14.0 (57.2)	18.1 (64.6)	21.7 (71.1)	24.4 (75.9)	16.8 (62.2)
Mean daily minimum °C (°F)	18.3 (64.9)	16.9 (62.4)	15.0 (59.0)	10.5 (50.9)	6.6 (43.9)	3.0 (37.4)	1.9 (35.4)	4.1 (39.4)	7.3 (45.1)	11.1 (52.0)	14.4 (57.9)	17.0 (62.6)	10.5 (50.9)
Record low °C (°F)	5.3 (41.5)	4.0 (39.2)	−1.4 (29.5)	−2.8 (27.0)	−6.6 (20.1)	−8.2 (17.2)	−9.4 (15.1)	−7.0 (19.4)	−5.2 (22.6)	−1.9 (28.6)	−0.3 (31.5)	2.4 (36.3)	−9.4 (15.1)
Average precipitation mm (inches)	48.0 (1.89)	45.0 (1.77)	47.1 (1.85)	19.5 (0.77)	10.9 (0.43)	3.1 (0.12)	3.1 (0.12)	5.9 (0.23)	8.4 (0.33)	15.4 (0.61)	26.6 (1.05)	29.6 (1.17)	262.6 (10.34)
Average precipitation days (≥ 0.1 mm)	6.4	5.3	4.3	2.9	2.5	1.1	1.2	1.5	1.9	2.5	3.8	4.6	38.0
Average snowy days	0.0	0.0	0.0	0.0	0.1	0.1	0.5	0.3	0.1	0.0	0.0	0.0	1.1
Average relative humidity (%)	53.5	58.6	63.8	67.5	69.8	66.4	61.3	53.8	50.9	49.7	48.8	48.8	57.7
Mean monthly sunshine hours	322.4	262.7	251.1	213.0	198.4	192.0	217.0	235.6	246.0	282.1	312.0	331.7	3,064
Mean daily sunshine hours	10.4	9.3	8.1	7.1	6.4	6.4	7.0	7.6	8.2	9.1	10.4	10.7	8.4
Source: Servicio Meteorológico Nacional

== See also ==
- Mendoza wine
