= Tunuyán Department =

Tunuyán Departamento Tunuyán
- Department
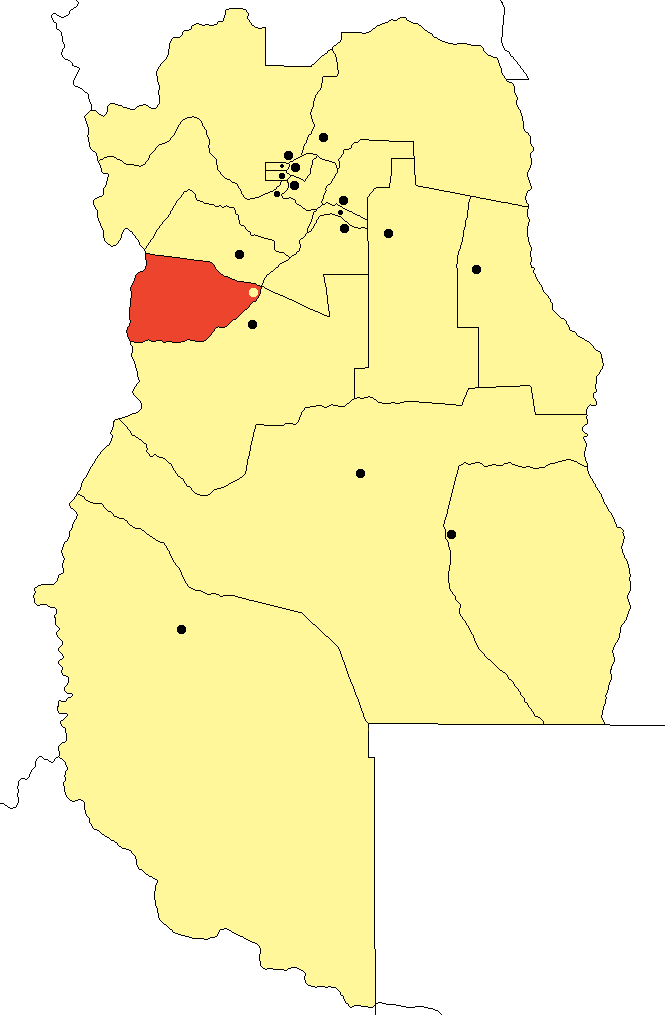
- location of Tunuyán Department in Mendoza Province
- Coordinates: 33°34′08″S 69°01′35″W
- Country: Argentina
- Established: November 25, 1880
- Founder: ?
- Seat: Tunuyán

Government
  - Intendant: Emir Andraos, PJ

Area
  - Total: 3,317 km^{2} (1,281 sq mi)

Population (2022 census [INDEC])
  - Total: 60,171
  - Density: 18.14/km^{2} (46.98/sq mi)
- Demonym: tunuyanense
- Postal Code: M5560
- IFAM: MZA017
- Area Code: 02622
- Patron saint: ?
- Website: www.tunuyan.gov.ar

Tunuyán Department is a department located on the eastern border of Mendoza Province in Argentina.

The provincial subdivision has a population of about 42,000 inhabitants in an area of 3,317 km^{2} (1,281 sq mi), and its capital city is Tunuyán, which is located around 1,175 km (730 mi) from the Capital Federal.

== Districts ==
- Campo de los Andes
- Colonia Las Rosas
- El Algarrobo
- El Totoral
- La Primavera
- Las Pintadas
- Los Árboles
- Los Chacales
- Los Sauces
- Tunuyán
- Villa Seca
- Vista Flores
