= Las Heras Department =

Las Heras Departamento de Las Heras
- Department
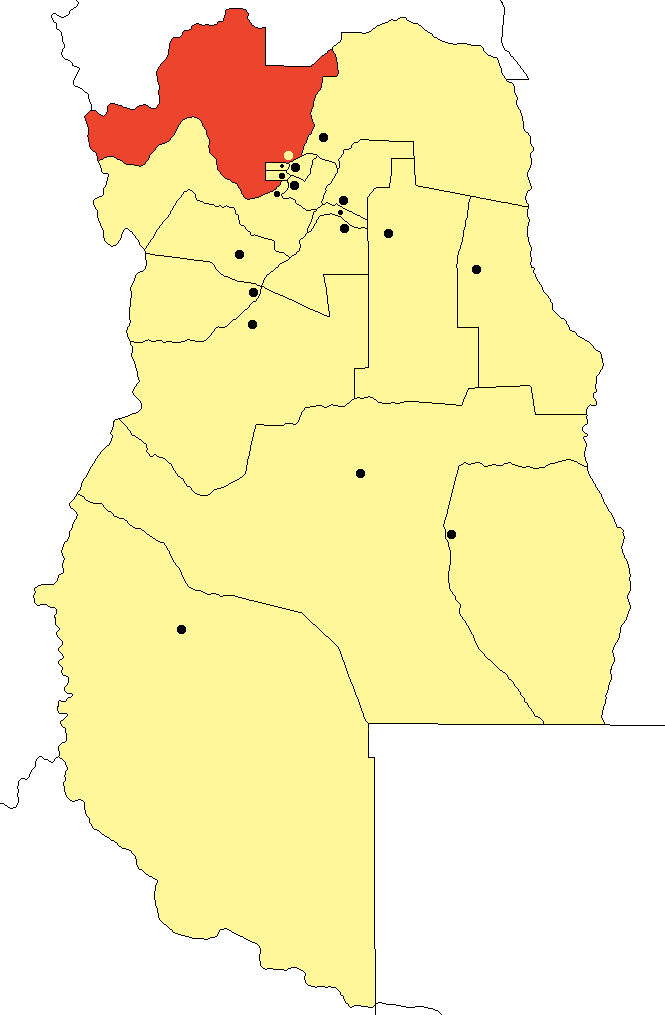
- location of Las Heras Department in Mendoza Province
- Coordinates: 32°51′S 68°49′W
- Country: Argentina
- Established: January 31, 1871
- Founder: ?
- Seat: Las Heras

Government
  - Intendant: Francisco Lo Presti, UCR

Area
  - Total: 8,955 km^{2} (3,458 sq mi)

Population (2022 census [INDEC])
  - Total: 234,401
  - Density: 26.18/km^{2} (67.79/sq mi)
- Demonym: lasherino/na
- Postal Code: M5539
- IFAM: MZA006
- Area Code: 0261
- Patron saint: ?
- Website: web.archive.org/web/20080820082720/http://www.lasheras-mendoza.gov.ar/

Las Heras is a department located in the northwest of Mendoza Province in Argentina.

As of the 2022 National Institute of Statistics and Censuses of Argentina census, the department has a population of 234,401 inhabitants in an area of 8,910 km^{2} (3,440 sq mi). Its capital city is Las Heras, which is located approximately 1,095 km (680 mi) from Buenos Aires. The province's international airport, Governor Francisco Gabrielli International Airport, is located within this department.

== Name ==
The Partido and its capital are named after General Juan Gregorio de las Heras (1780-1866), a military leader during the Argentine War of Independence.

== Districts ==
- Cieneguita
- El Algarrobal
- El Borbollón
- El Challao
- El Pastal
- El Plumerillo
- El Resguardo
- El Zapallar
- Las Cuevas
- Las Heras
- Panquehua
- Punta de Vacas
- Uspallata

== Geography ==
The mountains of the Andes act as a natural border between Argentina and Chile, the mountain range forms much of the western part of the department of Las Heras.

Mount Aconcagua is located in Las Heras Department, at 6,962 metres above sea level. It currently holds many records, including:

- The highest mountain in South America.
- The highest mountain in all of the Americas.
- The highest mountain in the Southern Hemisphere.
- The highest mountain outside of the continent of Asia
