= Lavalle Department, Mendoza =

Lavalle Departamento Lavalle
- Department
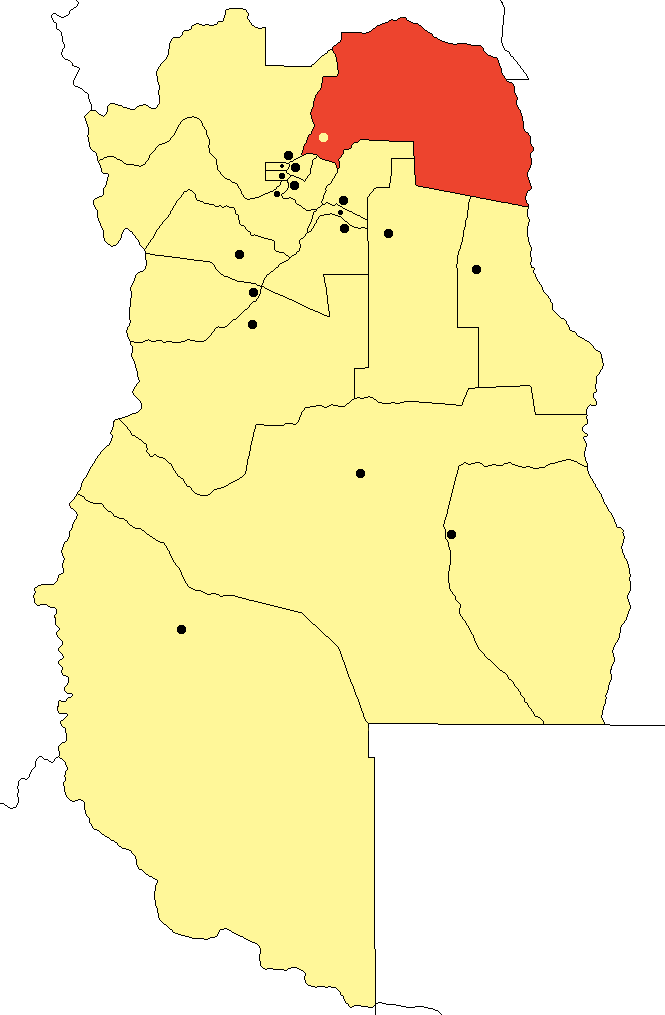
- location of Departamento Lavalle in Mendoza Province
- Coordinates: 32°43′S 68°35′W
- Country: Argentina
- Established: October 20, 1853
- Seat: Villa Tulumaya

Government
  - Intendant: Edgardo González, PJ

Area
  - Total: 10,212 km^{2} (3,943 sq mi)

Population (2022 census [INDEC])
  - Total: 47,167
  - Density: 4.6188/km^{2} (11.963/sq mi)
- Demonym: Lavallino/na
- Postal Code: M5664
- IFAM: MZA007
- Area Code: 02614

Lavalle Department is a department located in the northeast of Mendoza Province in Argentina.

The provincial subdivision has a population of about 32,000 inhabitants in an area of 10,212 km^{2} (3,943 sq mi), and its capital city is Villa Tulumaya, which is located around 1,095 km (680 mi) from the Capital federal.

== Districts ==
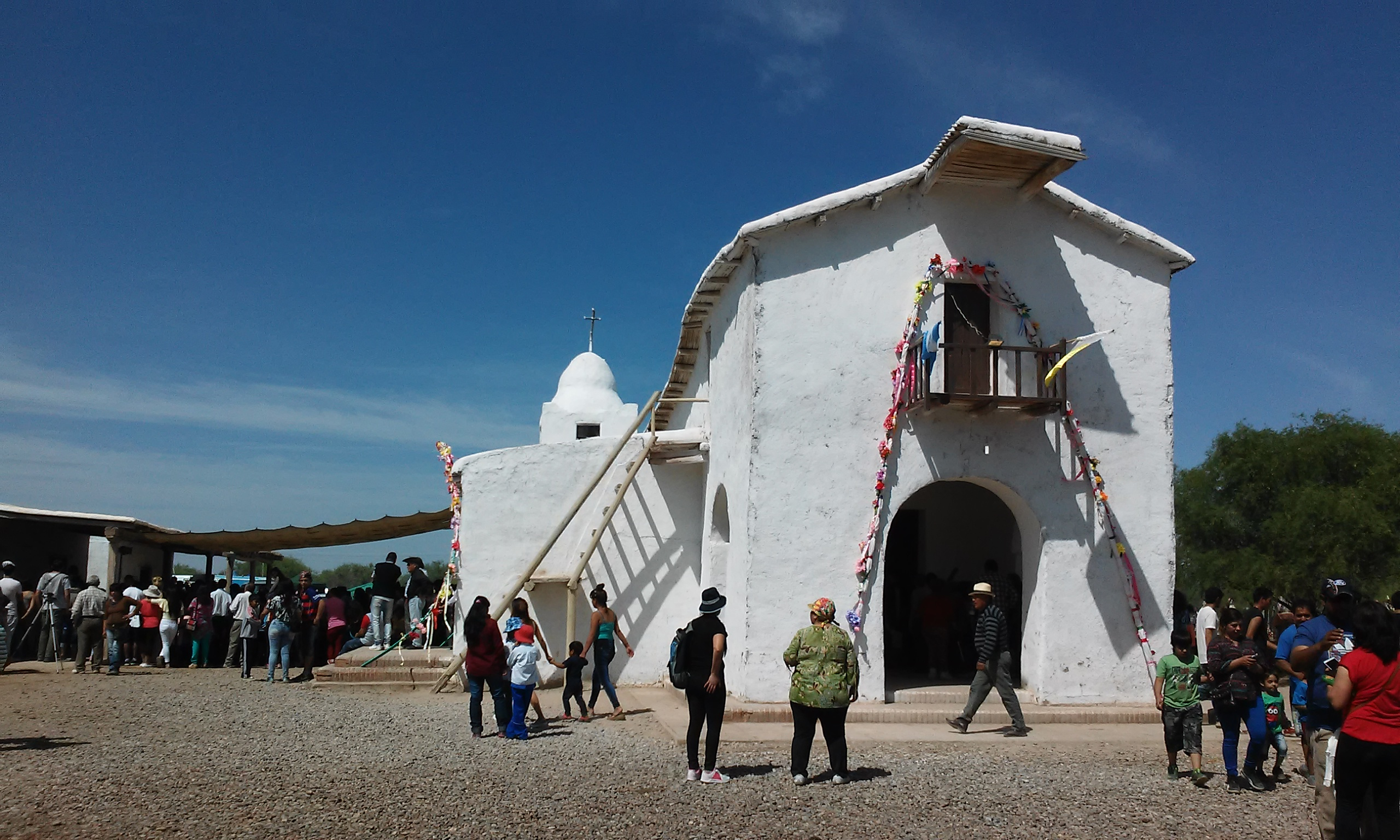
Capilla de Nuestra Señora del Rosario, Lagunas del Rosario

- Costa de Araujo
- El Carmen
- El Chilcal
- El Plumero
- El Vergel
- Gustavo André
- Jocolí
- Jocolí Viejo
- La Asunción
- La Holanda
- La Palmera
- La Pega
- Las Violetas
- Lagunas del Rosario
- Paramillo
- San Francisco
- San José
- San Miguel
- Tres de Mayo
