= La Paz Department, Mendoza =

La Paz Departamento La Paz
- Department
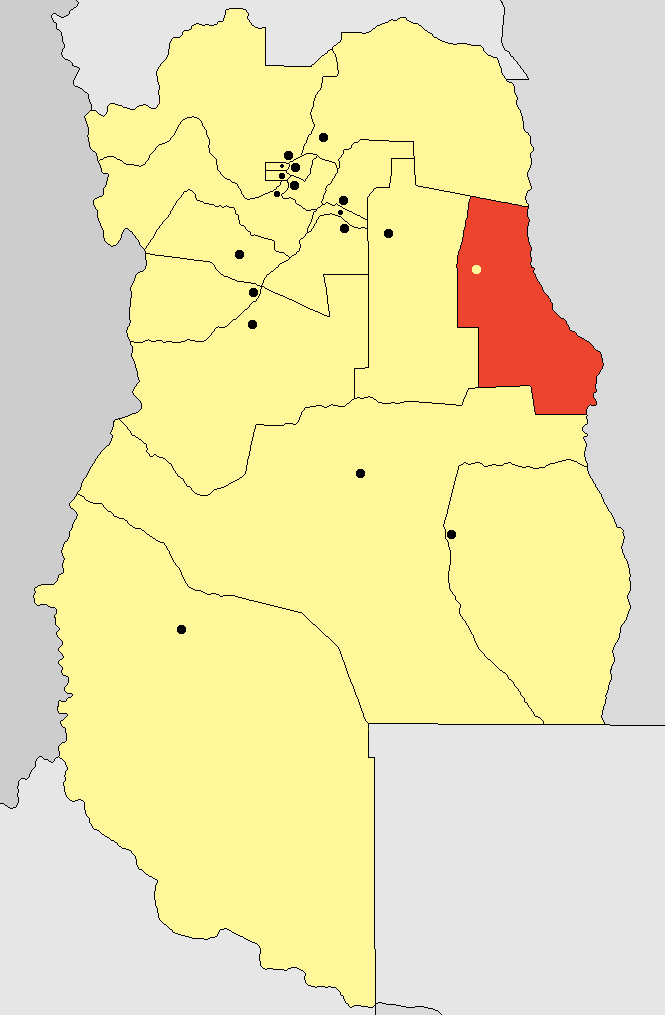
- location of La Paz in Mendoza Province
- Coordinates: 33°28′S 67°33′W
- Country: Argentina
- Established: August 4, 1850
- Founder: ?
- Seat: La Paz

Government
  - Intendant: Fernando Ubieta, PJ

Area
  - Total: 7,105 km^{2} (2,743 sq mi)

Population (2022 census [INDEC])
  - Total: 12,086
  - Density: 1.701/km^{2} (4.406/sq mi)
- Demonym: paceño/ña
- Postal Code: M5596
- IFAM: MZA005
- Area Code: 02626
- Patron saint: ?
- Website: web.archive.org/web/20070312054049/http://www.lapaz.mendoza.gov.ar/

La Paz is an eastern department of Mendoza Province in Argentina.

The provincial subdivision has a population of about 9,500 inhabitants in an area of 7,105 km^{2} (2,743 sq mi), and its capital city is La Paz.

== Districts ==
- Desaguadero
- La Paz Norte
- La Paz Sur
- Villa Antigua
