= Guaymallén Department =

Guaymallén Departamento Guaymallén
- Department
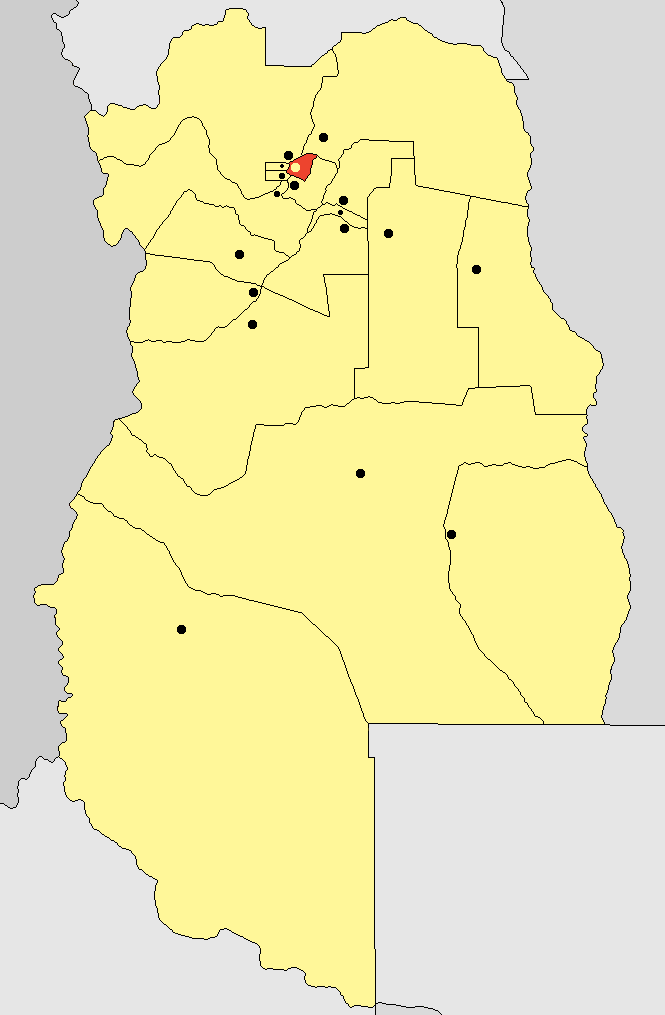
- location of Departamento Guaymallén in Mendoza Province
- Coordinates: 32°54′S 68°47′W
- Country: Argentina
- Established: May 14, 1858
- Founder: Don Juan Cornelio Moyano
- Seat: Villa Nueva

Government
  - Intendant: Marcos Calvente (UCR)

Area
  - Total: 164 km^{2} (63 sq mi)

Population (2022 census [INDEC])
  - Total: 321,966
  - Density: 1,960/km^{2} (5,080/sq mi)
- Demonym: guaymallino
- Postal Code: M5525
- IFAM: MZA003
- Area Code: 0261
- Patron saint: La Purísima, December 8
- Website: www.guaymallen.mendoza.gov.ar

Guaymallén is a central department of Mendoza Province in Argentina.

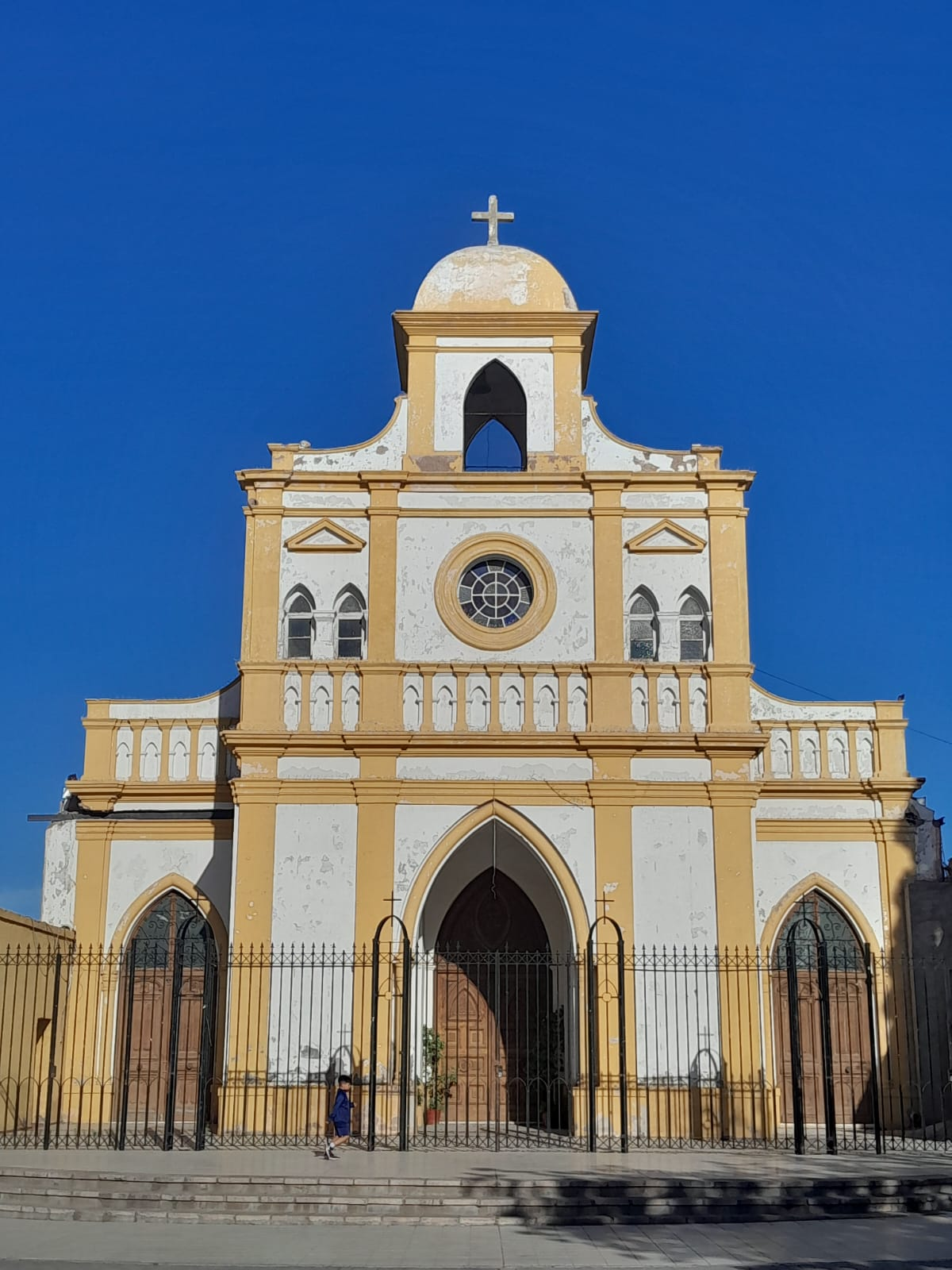
Sagrada Familia Parish in Villa Nueva

The provincial subdivision has a population of about 250,000 inhabitants in an area of 164 km^{2} (63 sq mi), and its capital city is Villa Nueva, which is located around 1,090 km (680 mi) from Buenos Aires.

== History ==
- 1858, on May 14 Guaymallén Department was created.
- 1896, on May 19 Villa Nueva was declared as cabecera (capital) of the department.

== Economy ==
The economy of the Guaymallén Department, represented 8.7% of the economy of Mendoza Province.

The three main sectors of the economy are banks and financial institutions, the service sector, and industry and manufacturing.

== Districts ==
Guaymallén Department is divided into 21 districts, the last of them—Colonia Molina—was created in 2014:

- Belgrano
- Bermejo
- Buena Nueva
- Capilla del Rosario
- Colonia Segovia
- Dorrego
- El Sauce
- Jesús Nazareno
- Kilómetro 8
- Kilómetro 11
- La Primavera
- Las Cañas
- Los Corralitos
- Nueva Ciudad
- Pedro Molina
- Puente de Hierro
- Rodeo de la Cruz
- San Francisco del Monte
- San José
- Villa Nueva
- Colonia Molina

== Seismic Activity ==
The seismicity of the Cuyo region (central-west Argentina) is frequent and of low intensity, with a seismic gap of moderate to severe earthquakes roughly every 20 years.
