= List of vineyards and wineries =

The following is a non-exhaustive list of vineyards and wineries from around the world.

== Argentina ==
- Adrianna Vineyard, Mendoza
- Bodega Catena Zapata, Mendoza

== Australia ==
=== New South Wales ===
- Botobolar Vineyard
- De Bortoli Wines
- Wyndham Estate

=== Tasmania ===
- Bruny Island Premium Wines
- Moorilla Estate

=== Victoria ===
- Brown Brothers Milawa Vineyard
- De Bortoli Wines
- Tahbilk

== Bulgaria ==
- Winery Balar AD, Upper Thracian Plain
- Villa Melnik Winery

== Canada ==
- Colio Estate Wines
- Diamond Estates Wines & Spirits Ltd.
- Gaspereau Vineyards
- Haywire Winery
- Pelee Island Winery
- Prince Edward County Wine
- Strewn Winery
- Vignoble Carone

== Chile ==
- Concha y Toro Winery
- Viña Vik

== England ==
- Chapel Down
- Denbies Wine Estate
- Sedlescombe vineyard
- Squerryes Estate
- Stanlake Park Wine Estate
- Wickham Vineyards

== France ==
- Château Branaire-Ducru
- Château Brane-Cantenac
- Château de Camensac
- Château Cheval Blanc
- Château de Curton
- Château Ducru-Beaucaillou
- Château Figeac
- Chateau Haut-Bages Liberal
- Château Haut-Bailly
- Château Haut-Brion
- Château Haut-Marbuzet
- Château Lafite Rothschild
- Château Lascombes
- Château Latour
- Château Leoville Las Cases
- Château Lynch-Moussas
- Château Margaux
- Château Montrose
- Château Mouton Rothschild
- Château Pétrus
- Château de Pommard
- Château Pontet-Canet
- Château Rauzan-Gassies
- Château Suau (Capian)
- Domaine Henri Milan
- Domaine Laroche

== New Zealand ==
- Cloudy Bay Vineyards
- Grove Mill
- Montana Wines
- Pegasus Bay Vineyards
- Two Paddocks
- Villa Maria Estates
- Yealands Estate

== Romania ==
- Băbească neagră
- Busuioacă de Bohotin
- Cotnari
- Dealing Mare
- Fetească albă
- Fetească neagră
- Fetească regală
- Grasă de Cotnari
- Halewood
- Jidvei
- Murfatlar
- Tămâioasă Românească

== Switzerland ==
- Auvernier Castle Cellars
- Fonjallaz
- Maienhalde

== United States ==
- Chalone Vineyard
- Chateau Montelena
- Chateau Morrisette Winery
- Clos Du Val Winery
- David Bruce Winery
- E & J Gallo Winery
- Freemark Abbey Winery
- Grgich Hills Estate
- Heitz Wine Cellars
- Inglenook Winery
- Kendall-Jackson
- Louis M. Martini Winery
- Mayacamas Vineyards
- Messina Hof
- Opus One Winery
- Remick Ridge Vineyards
- Ridge Vineyards
- Kedem Winery
- Rubicon Estate Winery
- Silverado Vineyards Winery
- Spring Mountain Vineyard
- Stag's Leap Wine Cellars
- Stags' Leap Winery
- Sterling Vineyards
- Trefethen Vineyards
- The Williamsburg Winery

== See also ==
- List of wine-producing countries
- List of wine-producing regions
- Lists of vineyards and wineries
- Outline of wine
- Wine
