= Bodega Catena Zapata =

Winery in Mendoza, Agrelo, Argentina

Coordinates: 33.1640875°S 68.9195863°W

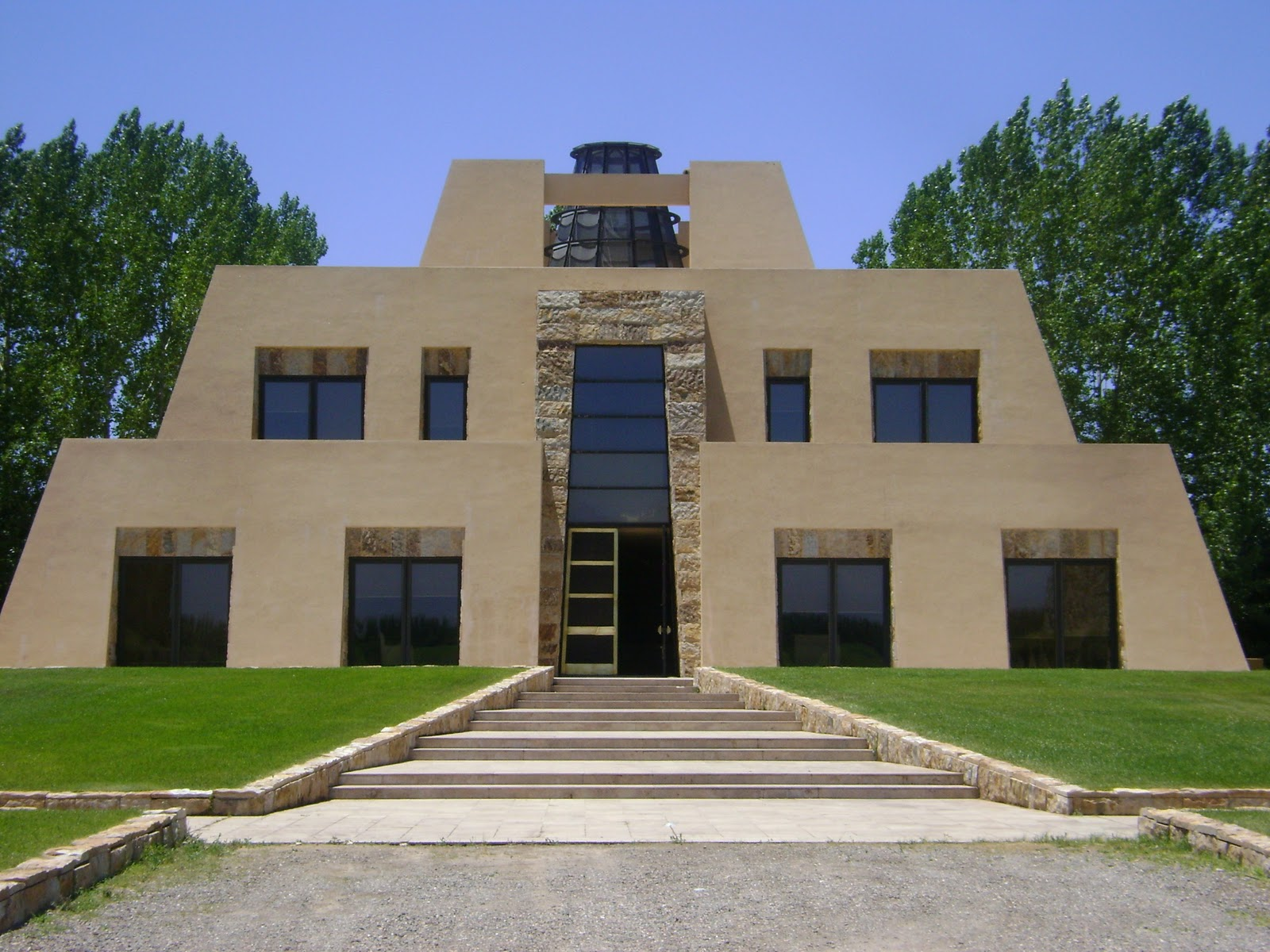
- Catena Zapata's Mayan Pyramid
- Location: Mendoza, Argentina
- Appellation: Mendoza Wine
- Founded: 1902
- Key people: Nicola Catena, Domingo V. Catena, Nicolás Catena Zapata, Laura Catena, Alejandro Vigil
- Known for: High Altitude Malbec
- Varietals: Malbec, Chardonnay, Cabernet Sauvignon
- Distribution: International
- Website: http://www.catenazapata.com/

Bodega Catena Zapata is a family-owned winery located in Mendoza, in the sub appellation of Agrelo, Luján de Cuyo, Argentina. The winery was founded in 1902 by Italian immigrant Nicola Catena and was later passed to his son Domingo.

Domingo’s son, Nicolás Catena Zapata was a pioneer to introduce European winemaking techniques to Argentina, including the introduction of Malbec and vine growing in high altitudes.

Nicolás Catena’s daughter, Laura Catena, and other members of the Zapata family, are also involved in the winery.

The winery structure in Agrelo, Mendoza, has a pyramid design based on Mayan architecture. It was designed by architect Pablo Sánchez Elía and built in the late 1990s.

== History ==
=== Origins and first generation (1902-1960) ===
Nicola Catena, whose family had a tradition of winemaking in Belforte del Chienti in the Marche region of Italy, immigrated to Argentina in 1898.

In 1902, he planted his first vineyard of Malbec in Mendoza, a grape variety that, before this period, was mainly used as a blending grape in Bordeaux. The winery was originally located in La Libertad, Rivadavia, Mendoza.

=== Modernization and international expansion (1963-1994) ===
Nicolás Catena Zapata held a Doctorate in Economic Sciences from the National University of Cuyo and a Master's degree in Mathematical Economics from Columbia University. In 1963, he took charge of the family business. In his early years at the winery, he expanded the business to include bottling. While a visiting scholar at the University of California, Berkeley, in the early 1980s, Nicolás Catena visited the wineries of Napa Valley. In the early 1990s, Nicolás Catena began the development of vineyards in Gualtallary, in the Uco Valley, at 1,500 meters above sea level.

In 1992, he planted a vineyard under the name Adrianna, after his youngest daughter. The vineyard’s altitude was considered experimental because the Gualtallary district did not previously support viticulture because of its extreme climate.

=== Fourth generation (1995-present) ===
Laura Catena and Nicolás Catena Zapata (2011)

Having earned a degree in Biology from Harvard University and a medical degree from Stanford University, Laura Catena joined the family winery in 1995, after a career as an emergency room physician. In the same year, she founded the Catena Institute of Wine, a scientific research center focused on the study of Argentine high-altitude terroir, Malbec flavor, Malbec genetic diversity, and the advancement of sustainable viticulture. Laura Catena was appointed managing director of Bodega Catena Zapata in 2012.

In 1999, Catena Zapata worked with Baron Éric de Rothschild, the owner of Château Lafite Rothschild, to create Bodega Caro.

Alejandro Vigil is the current Director of Winemaking for Catena Zapata, a position he has held since 2007. In 2008, Alejandro Vigil and Adrianna Catena, the youngest daughter of Nicolás Catena, founded El Enemigo Wines, which focuses on Cabernet Franc and Mendoza terroirs.

Between 2008 and 2023, Catena Family Wineries worked with the local glass manufacturer, Verallia (which is part of Saint-Gobain), to reduce the average weight of the bottles by 40%. The partnership resulted in an annual reduction of 1,200 metric tons of glass. The current average weight is 416 grams, compared to the global average of 550 grams. Furthermore, 97% of Catena Family Wineries’ wines are bottled in containers with weights of less than 510 grams.

In 2023, it was awarded the title of the World's Best Vineyards. In the same year, Laura Catena became the inaugural recipient of the Old Vine Hero Award. She has served as honorary president of the Wine & Spirit Education Trust since 2023.

In November 2026, Catena Zapata was named Best Fine Wine Producer in the Americas at the Golden Vines Awards, an annual event created by Liquid Icons in 2021. Winners are chosen by the Golden Vines Academy, whose nearly 1,300 members include Masters of Wine, Master Sommeliers, critics, educators and collectors.

== Viculture ==
=== High-altitude viticulture ===
In the early 1990s, Nicolás Catena began the development of vineyard plantings at elevations close to 1,500 meters in the Uco Valley. Further research carried out by the Catena Institute revealed that Malbec grapes grown at higher elevations have a different profile of acidity and phenolic content when compared with those grown at lower elevations. After the initiative taken by Nicolás Catena, other wine producers have subsequently planted their own vineyards at similar elevations in the Uco Valley. The Nicolás Catena Zapata 2013 vintage is made only in exceptional years from 200 discrete micro-vinifications, which correspond to different rows, elevations, and harvest times, and has a 24-month maturation process in French oak barrels, with only 25% being new.

=== Estate vineyards ===
The winery has six estate vineyards located in Mendoza: Angélica, La Pirámide, Nicasia, Domingo, Adrianna, and Angélica Sur.

The Angélica Vineyard, which dates back to 1922-1924, is located in Lunlunta, Maipú Department, and has some of the winery’s oldest pre-phylloxera Malbec vines. The La Pirámide Vineyard, founded in 1983, sits at 950 meters above sea level in Agrelo, Luján de Cuyo. Established nearly a decade later, in 1992, the Adrianna Vineyard reaches an altitude of 1,450 meters in Gualtallary, Tupungato. That same year, the Domingo Vineyard was planted in the Uco Valley at 1,120 meters. The Angélica Sur Vineyard, the most recent addition, was established in 2005 in San Carlos, at roughly 1,090 meters.

== Scientific research ==
The Catena Institute of Wine, established in 1995, has published scientific papers on the subject of terroir and Malbec.

In 2016, the Institute for Research and Development in Process Engineering, Biotechnology, and Alternative Energies (PROBIEN, CONICET-National University of Comahue) research team, along with the Catena Institute of Wine, developed a methodology for discriminating the terroir of Malbec wines by chemical analysis of phenolic compounds, which reached an accuracy of 92.6%.

In 2022, the journal OENO One published the results of the research carried out by the same research team, which analyzed the effect of extreme temperature events on the chemical composition of Malbec wines. The research focused on the 2013-2014 growing season, during which an extreme heat wave occurred in January. The results of the research show that high-altitude vineyards (1070-1450 m) in Valle de Uco have better adaptation capacities than those at lower altitudes (650-920 m) in the Luján de Cuyo region. Building on this altitude research, a 2023 study in the American Journal of Enology and Viticulture investigated solar radiation's role in phenolic development. Comparing shaded and unshaded vines across three elevation levels during the 2017-2018 season, the team found that radiation exclusion reduced anthocyanin concentrations at all altitudes, with mid-elevation sites showing the most pronounced effects.

The Catena Institute of Wine has also contributed to the international profile of Argentine ungrafted vineyards. The Instituto Nacional de Vitivinicultura (INV) reports that around 89% of the country's vineyards are ungrafted and massale-selected. This genetic material is preserved by the Catena Zapata team in its Viejito de Rivadavia Vineyard, an isolated site dedicated to the preservation of massale selections from old vines.

The Catena Institute of Wine led a study published in the scientific journal Scientific Reports demonstrating the existence of terroir and its persistence across vintages. Scientists analysed the phenolic profiles of 201 Malbec wines from 23 different parcels across 12 geographical indications in Mendoza, covering the 2016, 2017 and 2018 vintages. Of the 23 parcels studied, 11 could be identified with 100% accuracy through chemical analysis, while the remaining 12 were correctly identified 83% of the time.
