= Coquimbito =

- District
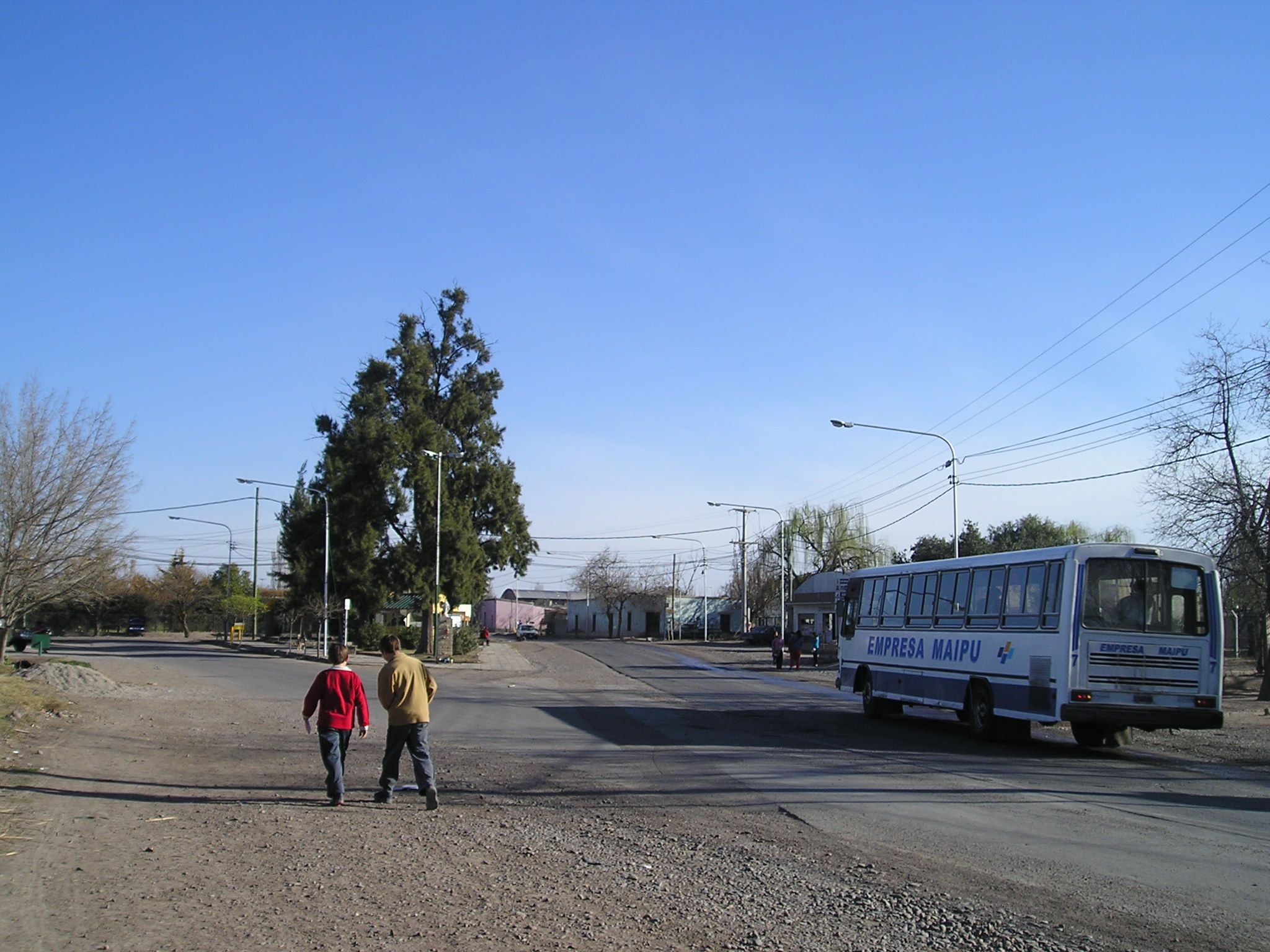
- Rutini Square and bus 170 on Urquiza Road

- Location of Coquimbito in Argentina
- Coordinates: 32°58′S 68°45′W
- Country: Argentina
- Province: Mendoza
- Department: Maipú Department
- Elevation: 759 m (2,490 ft)

Population
  - Total: 15,678
- Time zone: UTC−3 (ART)
- CPA base: M5513
- Dialing code: +54 261
- Climate: BWk

Coquimbito is a district in the Maipú Department, Mendoza Province, Argentina. It is located in the southeast of the metropolitan area of Mendoza (the provincial capital), and is administratively part of the municipality of Maipú. The name refers to the Chilean port city of Coquimbo. Historically a rural, wine-growing area, Coquimbito has become increasingly integrated into the urban fabric of Greater Mendoza while keeping its vineyards, olive groves and wineries.

Coquimbito is home to many vineyards (Cabernet Sauvignon, Malbec and Syrah), together with its associated winemaking industry. Other crops include almond, olive and plum.

Well-known wineries such as Peñaflor and La Rural (Rutini brand) are found in Coquimbito. Since the late 20th century the district has become a tourist attraction, where visitors are allowed to enter the wineries, witness the manufacturing process and taste the wine before it is commercialized.

== Urban development and transport ==
Maipú is one of the departments where the urbanised area of Greater Mendoza has grown the most: between 2018 and 2024 it added 3.87 km² of urban area, an increase of 11.3%, while the population of its urban area grew by 10.3%. The population of the department rose from 172,332 in 2010 to 219,402 in 2022, according to the national censuses. In 2012 the municipality updated the district's zoning to manage urban growth and new subdivisions, defining residential, urban reserve, service, industrial and rural zones.

The district's main road is Urquiza Road (Provincial Route 5), which links it with the city of Maipú and the rest of Greater Mendoza and is served by city bus lines. In 2011 work began on rebuilding about 2.5 km of the road between Tropero Sosa and Roca streets, a long-standing request of local residents, including concrete paving and a new drinking water network. The municipality also built a cycle lane along Urquiza Road, between Perito Moreno and Tropero Sosa, linked to the cycle network connecting Coquimbito with Rodeo del Medio and central Maipú.

== Tourism ==
Olive trees and vineyards in Coquimbito, with the Andes in the background

Coquimbito is part of the Maipú wine route. Wineries, the Wine Museum at Bodega La Rural and olive oil producers open to visitors are located along Urquiza Road (Provincial Route 5) and nearby streets. Because the establishments are close to one another on mostly flat terrain, touring the wineries by bicycle has become a popular activity, particularly among independent travellers. Several bicycle rental businesses are located along Urquiza Road in Coquimbito, which has become a common starting point for self-guided rides along the wine route.

== See also ==
- Mendoza wine
