= Winery Balar AD =

Bulgarian Winery

Balar AD
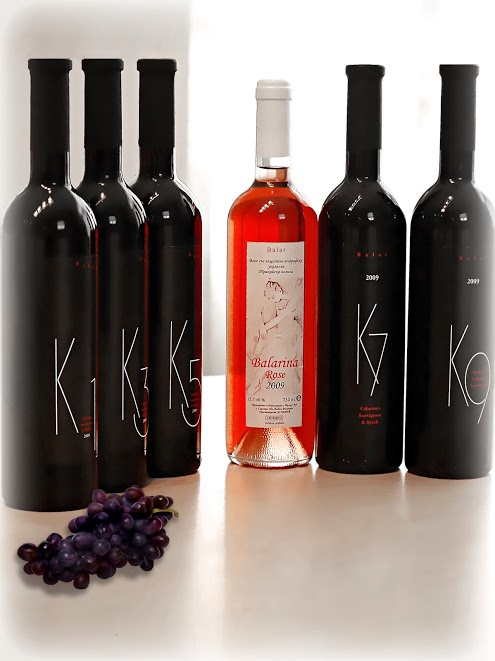
- Type: wine
- Origin: Bulgaria
- Introduced: 2005
- Website: http://www.wines-balar.com/

Balar Winery (Bulgarian: Винарска изба Балар АД) is a Bulgarian winery that manufactures boutique red and rose wines from Cabernet Sauvignon, Merlot and Syrah, and white wine from the varieties Muscat and Traminer.

The company was founded in 2005. The winery is located in the village Skalica, Yambol region . Own vineyards occupy an area of 130 decares.

== About ==
The company name "Balar" comes from the old Bulgarian word defining the concept of "learned man". Historically for the Bulgarians BAL (the knowledge) is the highest concept in the worldview of the ancient ancestors as Balar means "sage." In Sanskrit the word "Balar" means "strength."

== "K" line ==
The fine, boutique wines from the K line are K1, K3, K5, K7 and K9. They are a blend of the Merlot, Syrah and Cabernet Sauvignon varieties, grown in Bulgarian vineyards.

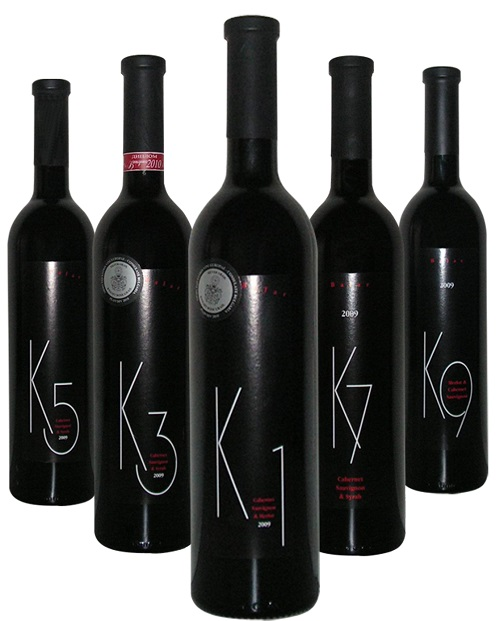

== Awards ==
2010			
Knight Wine Grail International Competition Plovdiv 2010		Silver Grail	K1 2009; К3 Cabernet Sauvignon & Syrah, 2009
Vinaria 2010	red wine grape varieties and vintage wine blends	Silver Medal and Honorary Diploma	К3 Cabernet Sauvignon & Syrah, 2009
2011			
Vinaria 2011	red wine grape varieties and vintage wine blends	Silver Medal and Honorary Diploma	К3 Cabernet Sauvignon & Syrah, 2010; К9 Мerlot & Cabernet Sauvignon, 2009
2014			
Avgustiada 2014, Festival of wine and cultural heritage Avgustiada, Stara Zagora, Bulgaria	People's Choice Award	Bronze Medal	К1 Syrah & Petit verdot, 2012

== Vitalized Wine ==
Vitalizing is a process of prolonged exposure to sound waves introduced directly into the wine so as to alter the structure and spectrum of radiation of the molecules in the beverage. The wine is sounded in this way with specially selected classical music, multiplies its qualities and positive effect on the human organism.

== See also ==
- Bulgarian wine
- List of Bulgarian wine regions
- List of wine-producing regions
- List of vineyards and wineries
