= Catena Institute of Wine =

Argentine wine research institute

- Founded: 1995
- Type: Research and development
- Purpose: Viticulture, Malbec, terroir, massal selections, high-altitude winemaking science, ungrafted vines, sensory science
- Location: Agrelo, Luján de Cuyo, Mendoza, Argentina
- Coordinates: 33.050°S 68.894°W
- Website: catenainstitute.com

The Catena Institute of Wine (CIW) is a research organization based in Mendoza, Argentina, focused on viticulture and enology. Its research areas include the Malbec grape variety, high-altitude viticulture, terroir characterization, soil microbiome, and sustainability practices in the Mendoza wine region.

The institute has conducted research in collaboration with Argentine national institutions and international universities, including the University of California, Davis and the University of Burgundy.

== History ==
The Catena Institute of Wine was founded by Laura Catena in 1995, with a focus on scientific research applied to viticulture and winemaking in the Mendoza region.

From its founding, the institute directed its research toward soil composition, climate, and micro-terroir, with particular emphasis on the Adrianna Vineyard, located in Gualtallary, Uco Valley, at an elevation of approximately 1,500 metres (4,900 ft) above sea level. The vineyard was planted by Nicolás Catena Zapata in the early 1990s.

The institute operates a pilot and commercial winery at its headquarters, "La Pirámide", in the Agrelo area of Luján de Cuyo, where microvinifications are carried out under standardized conditions.

== Research ==
=== Collaborations ===
The Institute has undertaken research projects in collaboration with national and international institutions, including National Scientific and Technical Research Council, the National University of Cuyo the Instituto de Biología Agrícola de Mendoza (IBAM), and the National Agricultural Technology Institute (INTA). International collaborations have included the University of California, Davis; the MICROWINE Network, a European Union-funded Marie Curie doctoral research consortium; the Jules Guyot Institute at the University of Burgundy; and the International Viticulture and Enology Society (IVES).

=== Terroir and phenolic characterization ===
A central line of research has focused on the chemical and sensory differentiation of Malbec wines by geographic origin within Mendoza. Studies published between 2018 and 2024 in Food Chemistry, Scientific Reports, and npj Science of Food demonstrated that individual parcelas and geographical indications could be distinguished by phenolic composition and sensory profiles across multiple vintages, using chemometric and random forest analyses. A 2021 study co-authored with CONICET and Linfield University (Oregon) was covered by Decanter magazine as providing chemical evidence for the persistence of terroir across vintages.

An earlier cross-continental study published in 2014 in Food Chemistry compared the chemical and sensory profiles of Malbec wines from Mendoza and California, providing an early chemometric framework for Malbec terroir characterization. A related phenolic study was published in 2015 in the American Journal of Enology and Viticulture.

=== Soil and microbiome ===
A 2022 study published in OENO One examined the effect of contrasting soil depths on root morphology, vine water status, vegetative and reproductive growth, ripening dynamics, and berry skin phenolic composition over three seasons. A 2024 study examined soil-associated fungal and prokaryotic diversity in a high-altitude plot of the Adrianna Vineyard, analyzing the influence of soil stoniness, depth, and vintage on microbial community structure.

=== Wine aging ===
A 2023 study conducted in collaboration with UC Davis and the Institute of Chemistry of Rosario (IQUIR-CONICET-UNR) analyzed the evolution of volatile aromatic compounds in Malbec wines from Mendoza and California over seven years of bottle aging, finding that regional differences in aromatic profiles remained detectable after extended storage.

=== Climate change ===
In 2016, Laura Catena was a co-author of a multi-contributor article on winemakers' field observations of climate change, published in the Journal of Wine Economics, alongside viticulturalists from Europe, South Africa, and North America.

== Recognition ==
In November 2024, the Catena Institute of Wine and the Universidad Nacional de Cuyo co-sponsored the 15th International Terroir Congress in Mendoza, which gathered 250 researchers from 15 countries.

The Catena Institute of Wine holds the status of research and industry associate of the Institute of Masters of Wine (IMW), the London-based organization responsible for administering the Master of Wine qualification.

In 2025, the CIW received the Best Sustainability Award at the Vinexposium V d'Or Awards.

== Internship programs ==
The CIW offers internship opportunities for wine students, including a summer scholarship in collaboration with UC Davis and scholarships for students enrolled in the Master of Wine program.
