= Adrianna Vineyard =

Vineyard in Mendoza, Argentina

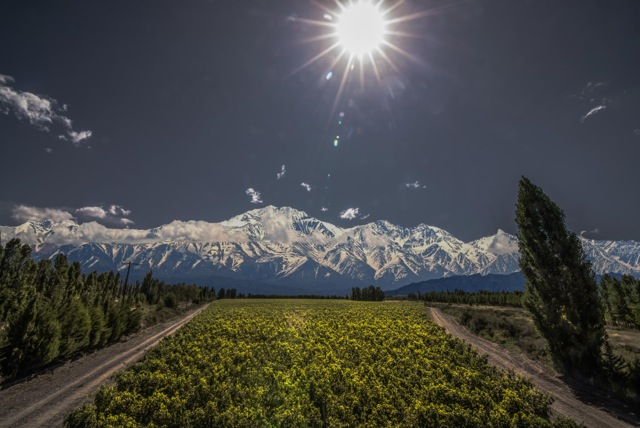
- Location: Gualtallary Monasterio, Tupungato, Uco Valley, Mendoza, Argentina
- Appellation: Mendoza wine
- Founded: 1992
- Key people: Nicolás Catena Zapata, Laura Catena, Adrianna Catena
- Known for: High Altitude Wine
- Varietals: Malbec, Chardonnay, Pinot Noir, Cabernet Sauvignon, Cabernet Franc
- Distribution: International

Adrianna Vineyard is a vineyard located in the Gualtallary district of Tupungato, Uco Valley, Mendoza, Argentina.

The vineyard is owned by Bodega Catena Zapata. It sits at almost 5,000 feet (1,450 m) elevation, and is named after Nicolás Catena Zapata's youngest daughter, Adrianna.

== History ==
After an external evaluation compared one of his wines unfavorably to those of warmer, less distinguished wine regions, Nicolás Catena Zapata directed his team to search for the coldest viticultural site in Mendoza Province. His team identified the upper part of Gualtallary, in a sector known as Monasterio, where no vineyards had previously been planted. Despite warnings from experts that grapes would not ripen at that elevation, Catena planted the site in 1992.

== Terroir ==
Adrianna Vineyard lies at almost 5,000 feet (1,450 m) above sea level. Higher elevation results in cooler temperatures and more intense solar radiation. Nicolás Catena Zapata had not initially expected the site to ripen grapes successfully. Subsequent research by the Catena Institute of Wine, in collaboration with Argentina's National Scientific and Technical Research Council (CONICET) and the Instituto de Biología Agrícola de Mendoza (IBAM), found that ultraviolet-B (UV-B) radiation is greater at high elevation. Increased UV-B exposure raises levels of protective pigments in the grape skin. Berry growth is reduced overall, but phenolic content—associated with color, concentration, and ripening—increases, which researchers have linked to improved wine quality. Roy Urvieta, an enology specialist at the Catena Institute of Wine, has described the mechanism as follows: at higher altitude, the thinner atmosphere allows more UV-B light through, prompting the vines to produce more anthocyanins, antioxidants, polyphenols, and terpenes.

The vineyard sits on an alluvial fan surrounded by hills and mountains, with soil depth varying according to patterns formed during the site's geological history. The soil composition is predominantly sandy gravel, with some areas containing more than 50 percent surface stones; layers of limestone, deposited by the shifting paths of an ancient riverbed, occur throughout the vineyard, generally at a depth of 20 to 50 centimeters. The Catena Institute of Wine has mapped this variability using an extensive network of soil pits. The site was known internally as the "nightmare vineyard" in its early years, because the heterogeneity of its soils made vineyard management difficult; plots at the same latitude could ripen two to three weeks apart from one another.

A study by researchers isolated plant growth-promoting rhizobacteria (PGPR) from grapevine roots and rhizosphere, finding that the bacteria helped vines retard water loss and induce defense-related compounds under stress conditions.

A separate study by researchers at the Catena Institute of Wine examined two adjoining parcels of shallow and deep soil in a Malbec vineyard at Adrianna over multiple growing seasons. Vines grown in shallow soil directed more resources toward root production, resulting in lower vigor and yields but a shorter ripening period; fine roots were concentrated in areas with higher proportions of clay, silt, and organic matter. Moderate water stress in shallow soils was associated with increased levels of anthocyanins, polyphenols, and antioxidant capacity in the grape skins, although greater water stress caused physiological harm.

A follow-up study on the same shallow- and deep-soil parcels, co-published in 2024 by the Catena Institute of Wine and CONICET, examined fungal and prokaryotic diversity in the vineyard's soil. The study found that soil stoniness significantly affected fungal community structure, with several fungal taxa more abundant in stony soil, while having a smaller effect on bacterial communities. Vintage was the most significant factor influencing both fungal and bacterial diversity, and calcium carbonate content specifically influenced the Proteobacteria phylum.

The vineyard is divided into parcels vinified separately, including River Stones, White Stones, White Bones, Fortuna Terrae, and Mundus Bacillus Terrae. It is planted with Malbec, Chardonnay, Cabernet Sauvignon, Pinot Noir, and Cabernet Franc. The White Bones and White Stones Chardonnay parcels lie approximately 50 meters (160 ft) apart but differ in soil water retention and sun exposure; according to vineyard manager Luis Reginato, the soil in White Bones retains more water and nutrients, producing greater vigor, a larger canopy, and more herbal aromas in the resulting wine, while White Stones receives more direct sunlight on the fruit, ripens earlier, and yields a wine with greater volume in the mouth.

== Wines ==
Writing in Vinous, critic Joaquín Hidalgo stated that Adrianna's two Gualtallary Chardonnays, White Stones and White Bones—made by Catena Zapata winemaking director Alejandro Vigil since 2007—have been part of Argentina's white wine development since 2009. Hidalgo noted that high-elevation Uco Valley sites such as Gualtallary, with their gravel, sand, and calcareous soils, impart aromas of native herbs including jarilla, heterotheca, and huacatay to the Chardonnay, which he described as an unusual characteristic for the variety.

Writing for the Financial Times, wine critic Jancis Robinson named the 2016 Adrianna Vineyard Fortuna Terrae among Argentine Malbecs she associated with a "new-wave" style, and described Gualtallary as having an established reputation for wines she called "particularly nervy, finely chiselled," despite the area's lack of official appellation status.

Eric Asimov of The New York Times wrote that wines from Mendoza's cooler, high-altitude sites, including Adrianna, display a minerality less common in wines from the region's traditional lower-altitude vineyards.

In July 2018, critic Luis Gutiérrez of The Wine Advocate scored the 2016 River Stones Malbec at 100 points, which the publication had not previously given to an Argentine wine.Critic James Suckling separately scored the 2018 vintages of the White Bones Chardonnay and the River Stones Malbec at 100 points each.

Wine Enthusiast critic Jesica Vargas scored the 2021 White Stones at 95 points and included it in the publication's Cellar Selection, noting acidity and aromas of celery, dried lemon, and light oak spice, with notes of green apple, lime, ginger, and mint. In January 2026, David Williams, wine critic for The Observer, wrote that the 2022 White Stones was "as good as any [chardonnay] in the world."
