= Argentina Wine Route =

Regions of Argentina that produce wine

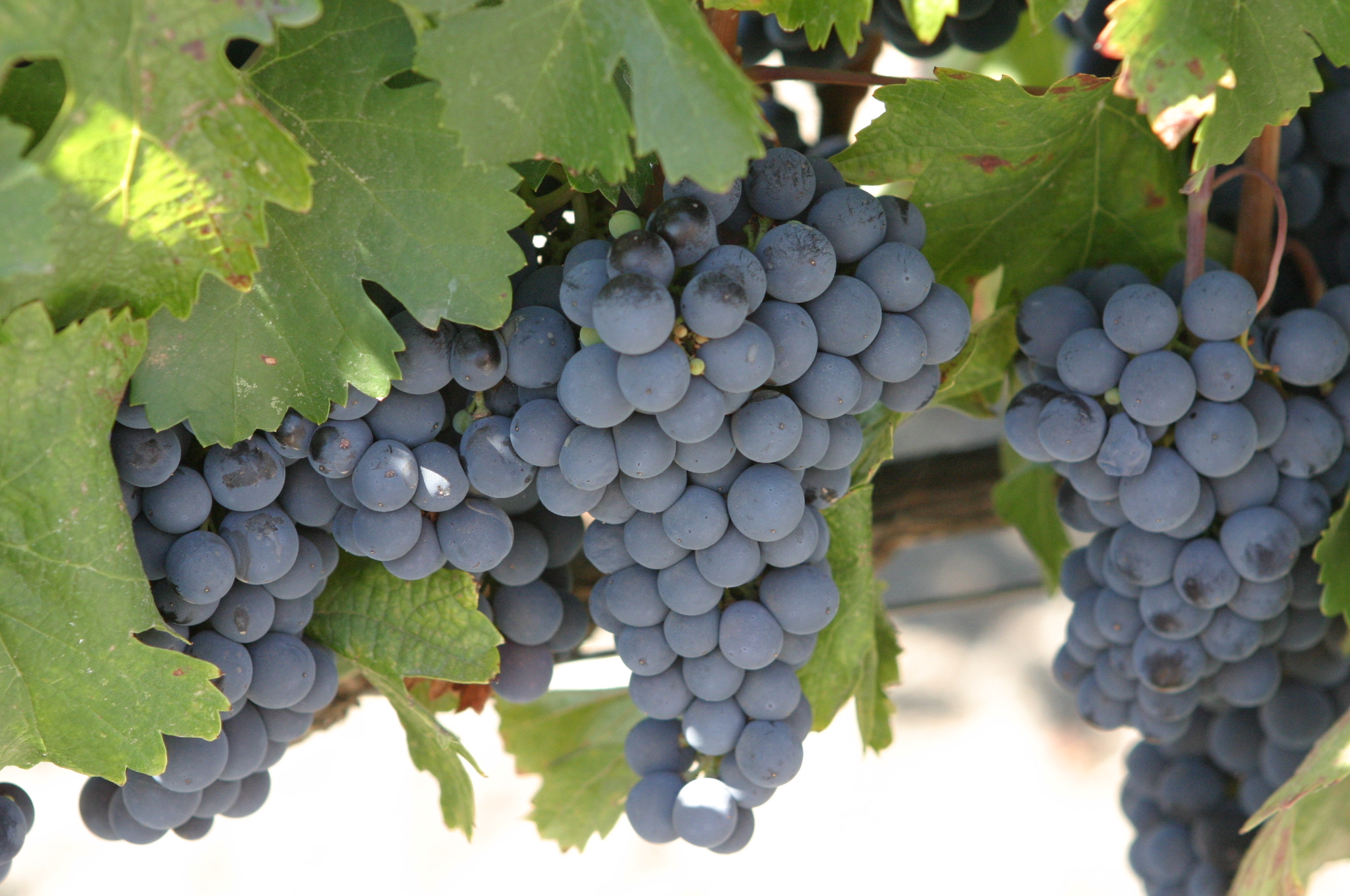
Argentina's Malbec Grape

The Argentina Wine Route (Spanish: Ruta del Vino) is an enotourism belt in Argentina that covers approximately 2,000 km (1,243 mi) and traverses several provinces and wine producing regions of varying altitudes and geographical features. Argentina has an estimated 2,000 wineries, many of which now offer vineyard and winery tours, as well as hospitality accommodations for the country's growing number of wine related tourists. Argentina is the largest producer of wine in South America, and the 5th largest producer of wine in the world.

== Regions ==
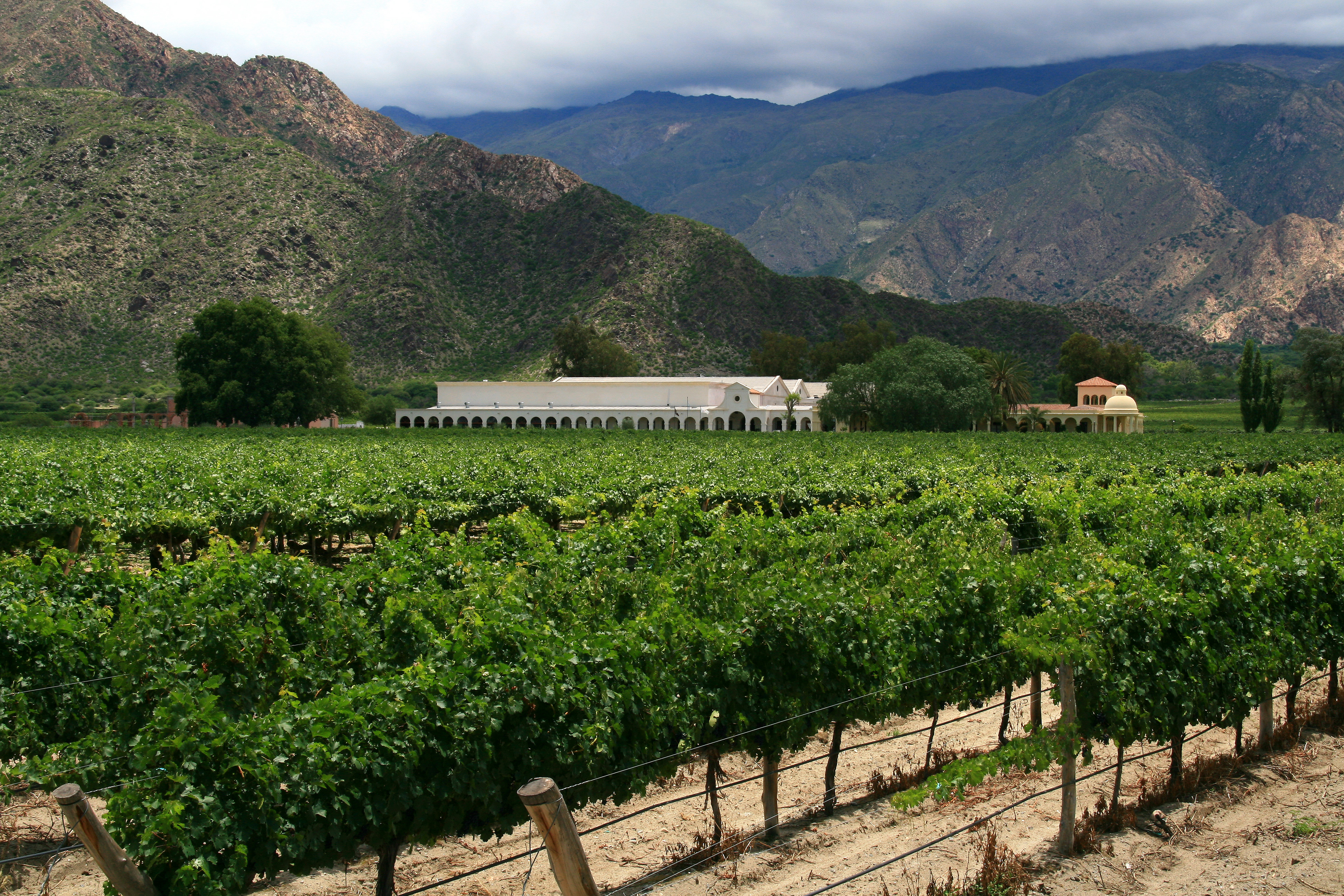
Winery in Cafayate, Salta.

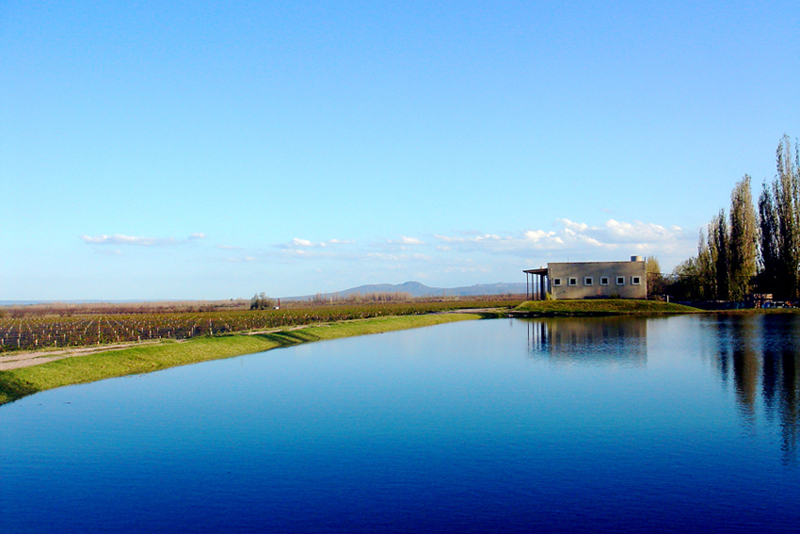
Algodon Wine Estates bodega, a boutique winery located in San Rafael, Mendoza. The Sierra Pintada mountains are visible in the distance.

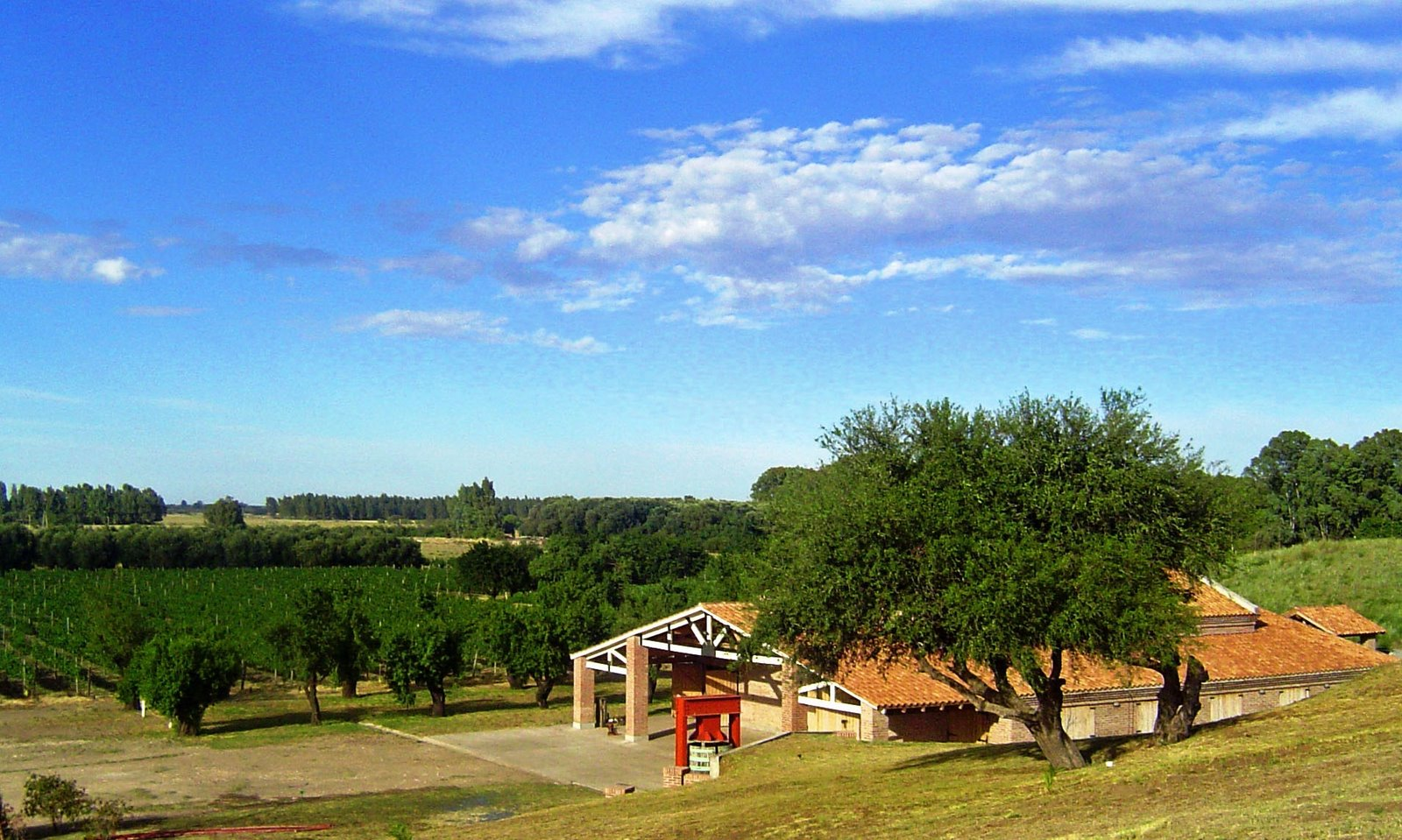
Al Este Bodega y Viñedos in Médanos, Buenos Aires

The wine regions of Argentina, though often defined differently depending on the source, encompass several provinces with some provinces being shared by more than one region. Most individual provinces may also be broken down further into sub enotourism regions, which are often indicated by departments (Departments of Argentina [Spanish: departamentos] form the second level of administrative division after provinces), cities, or cross provincial valleys (such as the Calchaquí Valleys) that may transverse and connect all three. Regardless of the regions system used, it is generally agreed that the most significant wine growing regions and provinces make up a variation of the following:

- The Cuyo region whose main wine producing provinces are Mendoza, San Juan, and San Luis. The Cuyo region is the most developed wine region, with Mendoza and San Juan being the largest wine producing provinces of Argentina. Mendoza, in particular, is responsible for more than 80% of Argentina’s wine. Mendoza has over one thousand wineries, and is planted with approximately 370,657 acres (150,000 ha) of vineyards.
- The Pampas (or Center Region) whose main wine producing provinces are Córdoba and Buenos Aires.
- The Argentine Northwest (or the “Andean Northwest” ) region whose main wine producing provinces are Catamarca, Jujuy, La Rioja, Salta, and Tucumán.
- The Southern Region (or Patagonia) whose main wine producing provinces are Río Negro, and Neuquén.

== Tourism ==
Argentina has emerged as one of the most important tourist destinations in Latin America. Since the 1998–2002 Argentine great depression in 2002, the devaluation of the peso has made it possible for many budgeting international tourists to enjoy levels of comfort such as fine hotels, upscale restaurants, and other luxuries otherwise unthinkable in other world wine centers. According to a 2006 study, approximately 1,004,810 tourists travel along the wine route annually. In 2006 alone, wine tourism in Argentina increased by 45 percent. For the growing numbers of domestic and foreign tourists, wineries have begun to hire dedicated staffs, hold special musical and arts events, and build restaurants and small hotels on the premises. Wine producers initially saw tourism as a way to increase brand visibility; however it has also become a means to increase wine sales as boutique wineries record up to 50 percent of income from this source, and the direct sales of larger wineries have also surged.

== Climate and altitude ==
Argentine wine regions are roughly the same distance from the equator as are the premier grape growing regions of France, Italy and California, yet due to its ideal dry climate, diseases that regularly affect vine varieties around the world are rarely found in Argentina. These regions are vast and largely desert-like, and they profit greatly from the pure irrigational runoff of Andean snow and glacial melt. The country’s close proximity to the Andes has vineyards being cultivated at altitudes ranging from 2,000 to 4,000 ft. These perfect elevations ensure that while the air temperature stays cool, grapes receive more solar radiation than those at lower altitudes. The resulting harvest produces grapes with increased water stress, tannin maturity, and higher bud productivity producing larger yields.

== Varietals ==
Although a number of grape varieties can be found growing in Argentina, the country’s most successful varietal is Malbec, a grape which has become largely synonymous with Argentine wine. Other grape varieties which perhaps hold the most promise for Argentina's future are Bonarda and Torrontés.

== History ==
Argentina's wine route is still relatively new. Although the country’s wine production dates back to the 16th century, the inclination of growth for consumption was essentially based on volume and not quality, so there was little significance placed on the art of planting vine varieties best suited to each location and its ecosystem. Argentina’s wine industry was transformed in the 1990s when international investors had the foresight to recognize the value and untapped resource of Argentina's wine producing potential. It has been estimated that over $1.5 billion in new vineyard investment occurred in the following decade, designed to strengthen and improve the industry's production quality. Argentina wine regions have since undergone a radical transformation, and now rival the production quality of European wine-producing countries. The concept of creating tourism oriented enterprises has taken form over the past decade. Renowned architects are translating brand identity into built structures, and now numerous iconic wineries dot the landscape of Argentina’s wine regions. Many of these wineries feature tourist accommodations, restaurants, wine tasting & food matching seminars, pruning & harvesting tours, and other wine-related experiences. Wine industry associations and various universities have been encouraging this process by launching well-funded studies to analyze the future of enotourism, by mapping out wine routes, and by offering specialized training courses for wine industry personnel.
