= Felipe Rutini =

Italo-argentine winemaker

Don Felipe Rutini
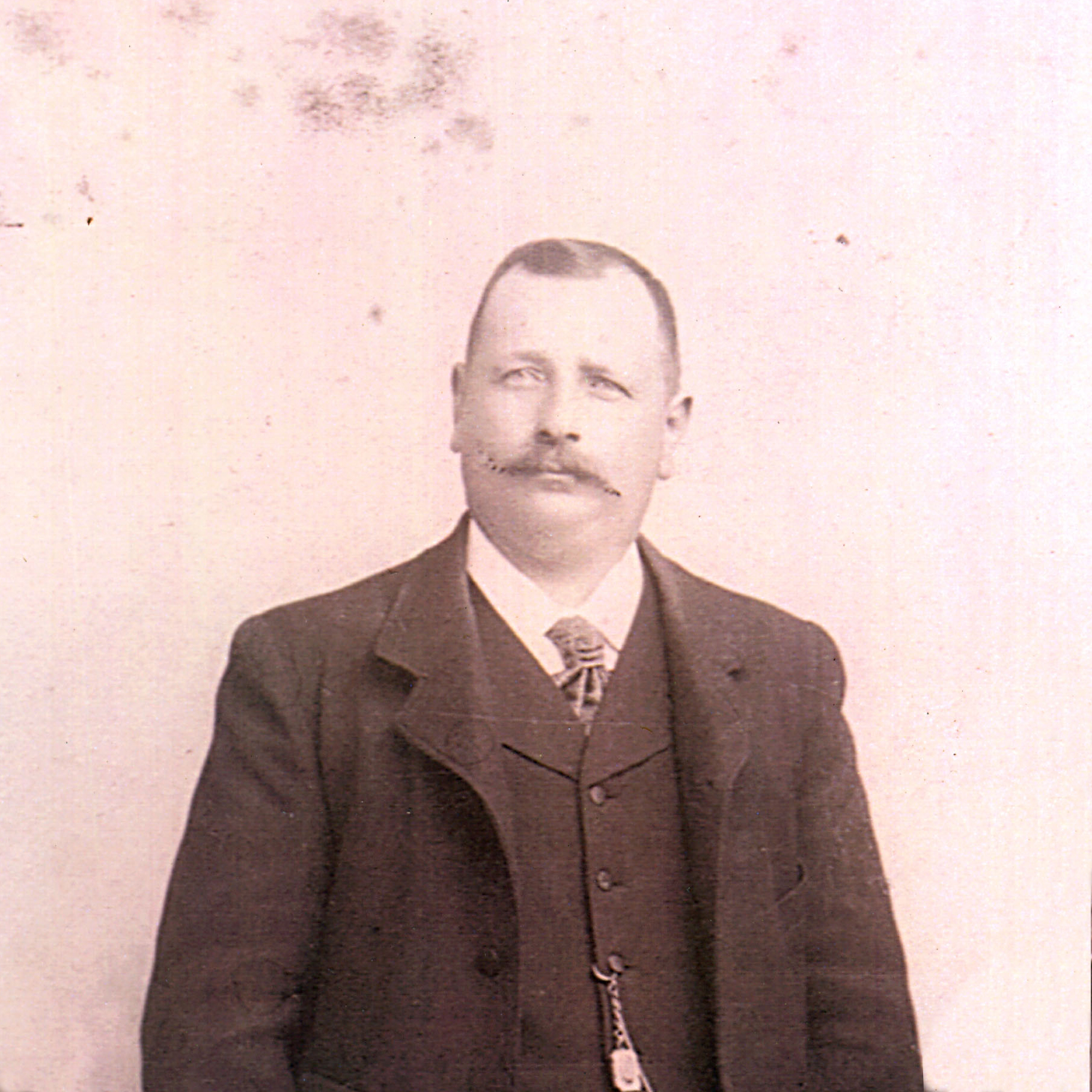
- Portrait of Rutini
- Born: December 3, 1866; Torre San Patrizio, Italy
- Died: January 19, 1919 (aged 52); At sea
- Education: Reale Scuola di Agricoltura di Ascoli Piceno
- Occupation: Winemaker
- Years active: 1885–1919
- Organization: Rutini Wines
- Notable work: Founder of Rutini Wines, Wine Museum in Mendoza
- Successor: Rodolfo Reina Rutini

Felipe Rutini (December 3, 1866 – January 19, 1919) is best known as one of the four great Italian winemakers in Mendoza. and founder of "Rutini Wines", La Rural Winery and the Wine Museum of Mendoza.

== Early life ==
Felipe attended the Royal School of Agriculture of Ascoli Piceno, where he obtained the degree of Agricultural Technician. The Italian Risorgimento and the state of war in Europe drove him to the Americas and in 1884 he travelled to Mendoza, Argentina, where he settled.

Rutini acquired an estate in the district of Coquimbito, where he founded La Rural winery in 1885.

== Personal life ==
In 1890 he married Ernesta Cremaschi, an Italian immigrant, whose family also worked in the wine industry. They gave birth to seven children. In the 1900s Felipe created a partnership with his sister-in-law’s husband, Ángel Cavagnaro, which boosted the business and led him to start producing and marketing wine on a larger scale.

== Winery ==
Initially, the winery comprised two buildings and the family house. In 1910 he inaugurated new, spacious facilities to make the first Argentine high-end wines. State-of-the-art machinery was imported from Europe. Felipe Rutini’s growth strategy included expanding to new markets, mainly Buenos Aires and Santa Fe, Argentina.

== Death and legacy ==
Felipe Rutini died in 1919.

After his death his descendants returned to Coquimbito to continue the work of Don Felipe and expand the business, guided by Doña Ernesta and her sons Francisco, Italo and Oscar. In the 1930s they planted red and white varieties for high-end wines in their new estate in Tupungato and in their properties at Maipú and Rivadavia.

Within a few years the brands under Bodega La Rural became well known by consumers and produced wines including the famous "San Felipe" in its distinctive "canteen bottle" and "Felipe Rutini", launched on the 100th anniversary of the winery’s foundation.
