= Willow Creek AVA =

American Viticultural Area in California

Coordinates: 40°54′55″N 123°36′40″W

Willow Creek
- Wine region
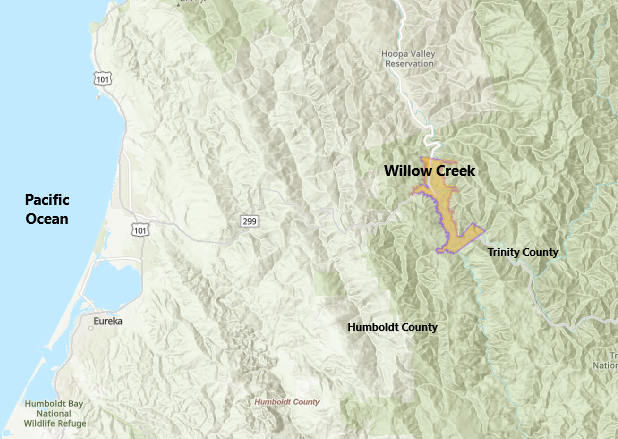
- Type: American Viticultural Area
- Year established: 1983
- Years of wine industry: 106
- Country: United States
- Part of: California, Humboldt County, Trinity County
- Growing season: 231 days
- Climate region: Region II-III
- Heat units: 3005.62 GDD units
- Precipitation (annual average): 39.9 in (1,013.5 mm)
- Soil conditions: Composed of Quaternary terrace gravels
- Total area: 6,000 acres (9.4 sq mi)
- Size of planted vineyards: 60 acres (24 ha)
- No. of vineyards: 7
- Grapes produced: Cabernet Franc, Cabernet Sauvignon, Chardonnay, Gewurztraminer, Malbec, Merlot, Mourvedre, Pinot Noir, Riesling, Sauvignon Blanc, Semillon, Sangiovese and Zinfandel
- No. of wineries: 3

Willow Creek is an American Viticultural Area (AVA) located in the upper northern California region on the edge of Humboldt County with a small portion protruding into Trinity County. It was established as the nation's 39^{th}, the state's 23^{rd} and the county's initial appellation on August 18, 1983, by the Bureau of Alcohol, Tobacco and Firearms (ATF), Treasury after reviewing the petition submitted by the Willow Creek Viticultural Area Committee on behalf of Humboldt County wineries and Willow Creek grape growers to propose the viticultural area named "Willow Creek."

It is one of the oldest, smallest and northernmost active appellations in the state located around the town of Willow Creek surrounded by the 4,000-foot (1,219 m) Klamath Mountains. In the center of the Six Rivers National Forest, the 6,000-acre (9 sq mi) viticultural area outlines a narrow valley formed by the Trinity River approximately 31 miles (50 km) inland from the frigid Pacific Ocean, however, it experiences an abundance of sunlight and heat due to the multiple mountain ranges encircling it.
The region is very rugged and mountainous with the cold crystal clear waters of the Trinity River rushing literally through the middle of the AVA with the valley floor lying 400 to 500 feet (120–150 m) above sea level surrounded by mountains. In 1983, there were as many as five wineries and seven vineyards cultivating 30 acres (12 ha) under vine. As of 2008, there were no commercially bonded wineries in the region, and only ten acres (4 ha) under vine.

== History ==
Willow Creek has long been known as a small geographic agricultural area located approximately 31 miles (50 km) from the Pacific Ocean. For years the main crops of the area, peaches, apples and tomatoes, were widely sought by Humboldt County residents. Willow Creek was first identified in 1851 by early miners and pack train drivers on their trips from Eureka, Arcata and Blue Lake to the interior valleys. They identified the area because of a heavy growth of willows around the mouth of the creek which emptied into the Trinity River. Other miners named the area China Flat in 1852 because of the heavy influence of the Chinese. This remained the name until 1912 when it was discovered that there was another China Flat in the mother lode area. At that time the name was changed back to Willow Creek in honor of those pack string drivers. Early agriculture started in the 1920s, when the Cambi family brought grape vines, peach trees and apples from Santa Cruz to the Willow Creek Valley. The Gambi's made wine from these early vines—mostly muscat. Other families started large orchards in the 1930s until there were approximately 150 acres (61 ha) in production. Eventually Willow Creek became famous throughout the county for its excellent produce and climate. The first commercial vineyard in the region was planted in 1974.

== Terroir ==
=== Topography ===
Generally, the Willow Creek viticulture area is situated in and around the confluence of the Trinity River and the South Fork of the Trinity River, approximately 31 miles (50 km) inland from the Pacific Ocean. The area surrounding the area is mountainous, at times rising sharply to high elevations and is approximately 7 1/2 miles (12.1 km) in length and 3 3/4 miles (6.0 km) at its widest point encompassing approximately 10,000 acres (16 sq mi). The elevation, above sea level, ranges from a low of 461 feet (141 m) on the valley floor to 1,500 feet (460 m) in the foothills. The ATF has evaluated the evidence and concluded that the natural valley comprising the Willow Creek viticultural area is geographiclly distinguishable from the surrounding mountainous areas based on the climatic differences in temperatures and the seasonal fluctuations in rainfall.

=== Climate ===
The Sunset New Western Garden Book places the Willow Creek viticulture area into a microclimate similar to the well known grape growing areas of California located at St. Helena and Napa Valley, in Napa County; Healdsburg, Cloverdale and Santa Rosa in Sonoma County; and Hopland and Ukiah in Mendocino County. This reference describes the climate as "...moderated by the effect of marine air on inland areas that otherwise would be colder in winter and hotter in summer..."
The Willow Creek viticultural area is influenced primarily by two major climatic forces; the proximity to the Pacific Ocean, 31 miles (50 km) to the west, and the warmer climate of the Sacramento Valley approximately 100 miles (160 km) eastward. These influences create easterly winds keeping the Willow Creek area fairly cool in the summer, while only infrequent freezes occur in the winter. The average high and low temperatures are moderate at 82.85 °F (28.25 °C) and 47.04 °F (8.36 °C) during the growing months of April through October. These figures are based on data collected during the past five growing seasons. The area to the east of Willow Creek experiences colder temperatures in winter, but hotter temperatures in summer. To the west of the Willow Creek area the winters are milder, but the summer temperatures are cooler due to Pacific Ocean maritime influence. The heat degree days of the area average 3005.62, based on climalic data gathered during the last three years. These heat units correspond to the top range of an Region II and the bottom range of an Region III. Rainfall, based on data gathered during the last 38 years, averages 39.9 inches (1,010 mm) per year. Although the average rainfall in the areas east and west of the Willow Creek area are comparable, the area to the west does receive slightly less rain. Further, this area receives its rainfall in the summer months, whereas the Willow Creek area receives most of its rainfall in the winter months. The USDA plant hardiness zones are 9a and 9b.

=== Soils ===
The soil composition of Willow Creek is primarily Quaternary terrace gravels, which provide excellent drainage for the vineyards. The vineyards of the area are situated on plateaus and benches at elevations varying from 461 to 1,500 feet (141–457 m). Soils in the mountains are typically made up of rocky shale and limestone.

== Viticulture ==
In 1974, the first commercial vineyard was planted. Today, there are five such vineyards comprising a total of approximately 30 acres (12 ha) in vitculture. The predominant varieties grown are Cabernet, Riesling, Gewürztraminer, Chardonnay Zinfandel, and Merlot. Under U.S. labeling regulations, wines may use the “Willow Creek” appellation if at least 85 percent of the grapes are grown within the AVA, regardless of where the wine is produced. Miles Garrett Wines is the only winery physically located within the boundaries of the AVA and the only one that produces wines from more than 85% of grapes from the Willow Creek AVA.

== See also ==
- California wine
