= Haywire Winery =

Canadian Winery located in the Okanagan Valley's Summerland, British Columbia

Coordinates: 49.5051698°N 119.9149754°W

- Location: Summerland, British Columbia, Canada
- Appellation: Okanagan Valley
- Founded: 2009
- First vintage: 2009
- Key people: Christine Coletta (owner), Steve Lornie (owner), Matt Dumayne (winemaker), Alberto Antonini (consulting winemaker), David Scholefield (wine advisor)
- Parent company: Okanagan Crush Pad Winery
- Cases/yr: 35,000
- Varietals: Pinot gris, Gamay Rosé, Pinot noir
- Other attractions: Okanagan Crush Pad Winery
- Distribution: Regional
- Tasting: Open year round
- Website: www.haywirewinery.com

Haywire Winery is a Canadian Winery located in the Okanagan Valley’s Summerland, British Columbia. Situated on a 10 acre lot, Haywire sits looking over Okanagan Lake.

== History ==
After purchasing the 10-acre property in 2005, owners Christine Coletta and Steve Lornie grew the existing Red Delicious apples and apricots for one season before switching to Pinot gris in 2006. The pair named the winery Switchback as it celebrated "the switch from losing money as apple growers to losing money as grape growers." The name Haywire comes from wire, originally used for baling hay, which tended to tangle in a chaotic way. The term also describes Coletta and Lornie's transition from city slickers to farmers to winery owners. After the first vintage in 2009, Haywire planned to source other varieties like Pinot noir from other growers in the valley.

== Winemaker ==
Winemaker Matt Dumayne, leads cellar operations with assistance from internationally known winemaking consultant Alberto Antonini. As the consulting oenologist, Antonini assists with winemaking protocols. Both Dumayne and Antonini also work with wine advisor David Scholefield on wine style.

== Okanagan Crush Pad ==
Haywire's Switchback Vineyard is also the home to Okanagan Crush Pad Winery, which is open to the public seasonally.
