= Strewn Winery =

Winery in Niagara-on-the-Lake, Ontario, Canada

Coordinates: 43.2524006°N 79.1279785°W

- Location: Niagara-on-the-Lake, Ontario, Canada
- Appellation: Niagara Peninsula
- Founded: 1997
- Key people: Joe Will (winemaker)
- Known for: Strewn Three (Meritage)
- Varietals: Merlot, Cabernet Franc, Cabernet Sauvignon, Riesling, Chardonnay, Sauvignon blanc, Gewürztraminer, Pinot blanc, Vidal
- Website: http://www.strewnwinery.com/

Strewn Winery is a small winery in Niagara-on-the-Lake, Ontario, Canada. It was established in 1997 by winemaker Joe Will and his wife, food writer Jane Langdon. Located on the former site of the Niagara Canning Company, it is Canada's first winery cooking school and its teaching "highlights the close relationship between food and wine."

The winery produces a selection of VQA certified wines using grapes grown in its own vineyard as well as other vineyards in the Niagara Peninsula. Strewn uses Merlot, Cabernet Franc, Cabernet Sauvignon, Riesling, Chardonnay, Sauvignon blanc, Gewürztraminer, Pinot blanc and Vidal grapes. In addition to traditional wines, they also produce sweeter late harvest and ice wines.

Wines are produced under three different labels. Their very best wines are labelled Strewn Terroir, including their red Strewn Three meritage. Their general wines are simply labelled Strewn.

The 2017 Strewn Barrel Aged Chardonnay won a silver medal at the 2019 Ontario Wine Awards.
