= Laura Catena =

American physician

Dr Laura Catena
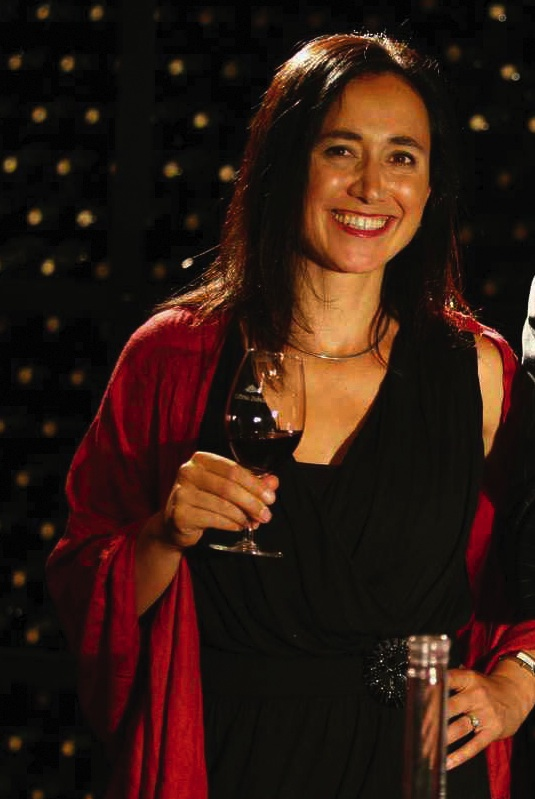
- Laura Catena at Bodega Catena Zapata
- Born: 1967 (age 58–59); Mendoza, Argentina
- Education: Harvard University; Stanford University
- Occupations: Managing Director of Bodega Catena Zapata. Author of "Vino Argentino", "Gold in the vineyards" and "Malbec Mon amour". Physician at University of California San Francisco, Owner of Luca Winery
- Website: LucaWines.com or Twitter or Instagram

Laura Catena (born 1967) is a fourth generation Argentine vintner, physician and author.

== Biography ==
Laura Catena was born in Mendoza, Argentina in 1967. She graduated magna cum laude in Biology from Harvard University in 1988 and has a Medical Doctor degree from Stanford University. She is currently managing director of Bodega Catena Zapata and her own Luca Winery in Mendoza, Argentina, as well as a practicing Pediatric Medicine physician at University of California San Francisco Medical Center in California.

Catena has been called the “face” of Argentine wine for her active role in promoting the Mendoza wine region and Argentine Malbec.

She has been named one of the "Top 25 Wine Innovators" and she has been an invited speaker at Must Summit, Master of Wine Symposium and the American Society of Wine Educators, Decanter Wine Encounter, the Smithsonian Institution and the Vancouver Playhouse among others. She has also been a guest blogger for eRobertParker.com and The Huffington Post and has been interviewed by Winelibrary.com, The Leonard Lopate show and The Drinks Business and NPR Radio, Here and Now.

In 2010, Laura Catena released her book, Vino Argentino, An Insider's Guide to the Wines and Wine Country of Argentina, published by Chronicle Books, which has been reviewed extensively by press in the USA and Internationally. In 2011, she released the Spanish/English and Portuguese/English editions with Argentine publisher Catapulta Editores. Her second book was Oro en los viñedos / Gold in the vineyards, a wonderful compilation of the world´s most celebrated vineyards, a Spanish/English edition published by Catapulta Editores in 2017.

The International Wine & Spirit Competition (IWSC) was established in 1969 as the first competition to promote and award the world’s best wines, spirits and liqueurs. Laura Catena served as President for its 46th year (2014), acting as an ambassador for IWSC and for fine wine globally.

Laura Catena was named one of the “100 Most Influential Latinas” by Latino Leaders in their digital and print May–June 2021 editions and was chosen as "Woman of the Year" by The Drinks Business Awards 2022.

In 2023, it was announced that Laura Catena will become WSET's new Honorary President.

== Bibliography ==
- Vino Argentino, An Insiders Guide to the Wines and Wine Country of Argentina (Chronicle Books - September 2010)
- Vino Argentino - Argentine Wine (Catapulta Editores - October 2011)
- Argentina chapter in The Business of Wine: An Encyclopedia by Jack Bronstrom and Geralyn Bronstrom (Greenwood Publishing - December 2008)
- Oro en los viñedos (Catapulta Editores - December 2017)
- Gold in the vineyards (Catapulta Editores - May 2020)
- Malbec Mon amour (Catapulta Editores - June 2021)
