= Vignoble Carone =

Coordinates: 45.9543604°N 73.2106203°W

Vignoble Carone Wines + Distillery
- Company type: Family Owned
- Industry: Winery
- Genre: Canadian winery
- Headquarters: Lanaudière, Quebec, Canada, Lanoraie, Canada
- Key people: Anthony Carone, Sarah Hoodspith, Victoria Carone, Olivia Carone, Katrina Carone
- Products: Wine
- Owner: Anthony Carone, Sarah Hoodspith
- Website: www.carone.ca

Vignoble Carone Wines is a Canadian winery located in the region of Lanaudière in Quebec, Canada, situated immediately to the northeast of Montreal, Quebec. Carone is an estate vineyard/winery and distillery owned by Anthony Carone and Sarah Hoodspith. The winery focuses on planting vitis vinifera and European crossed red grape vines. The winery has won international medals for their red wines and most recently released the first ever 100% Quebec grown Pinot noir wine. In August 2019, the winery expanded to craft distillation focusing on spirits produced exclusively from its grapes for a farm-to-flask approach.

== Anthony Carone ==
Anthony Carone (born 1 August 1965) is the owner and winemaker of Vignoble Carone Wines.

Born in Montreal, Quebec, Canada to Italian immigrant parents, Anthony was introduced to winemaking at a young age. He started making wine at the age of 5 and in his late 20s Anthony began studying winemaking with the Amateur Winemakers of Ontario (AWO) in the mid-1990s. In the end of the 1990s Anthony, alongside his parents, began converting land they owned from fruits and vegetables to a vineyard. Based on his successful grape growing and winemaking, in 2000, Anthony was asked by LittleFatWino, Larry Paterson to present data on various cold climate grape varieties to a group of Ontario winemakers. While planting a vineyard Anthony continued to make wine. In 2003, Anthony won his first winemaking medal at the Ontario club level and proceeded to win regional, provincial and national medals for winemaking at the amateur level. In 2005, Anthony became the first Quebec resident ever to have won a medal at the AWO provincial level - it was a medal for a Pinot Noir red wine.

After having made a name for himself amongst the Ontario winemaking community, Anthony looked closer to home and with two other avid amateur winemakers, he founded the Association des Vinificateurs Amateur du Québec (AVAQ - Amateur winemakers of Quebec) chapter of the Amateur Winemakers of Canada where he remains the Vice-President.

In 2005, Anthony's dream of owning a winery became a reality as Vignoble Carone Wines received its winemaking permit. Today Anthony is known best as the first winemaker to have won international medals for 100% Quebec grown red wines. Most recently, his Venice Pinot Noir won a silver medal at the InterVin International Wine Competition - a first for Quebec made red wines.

== Sarah Hoodspith ==
Sarah Hoodspith is the Director at Zenergy Communications and the co-owner and Director of Vignoble Carone Wines. In 2008, Hoodspith was awarded, alongside Anthony Carone, the Ordre National du Mérite Agricole, Bronze Chevalier award.

Hoodspith has spoken publicly about using social media as a business tool.
