= Messina Hof =

Texas-based winery

Coordinates: 30.7028°N 96.3233°W

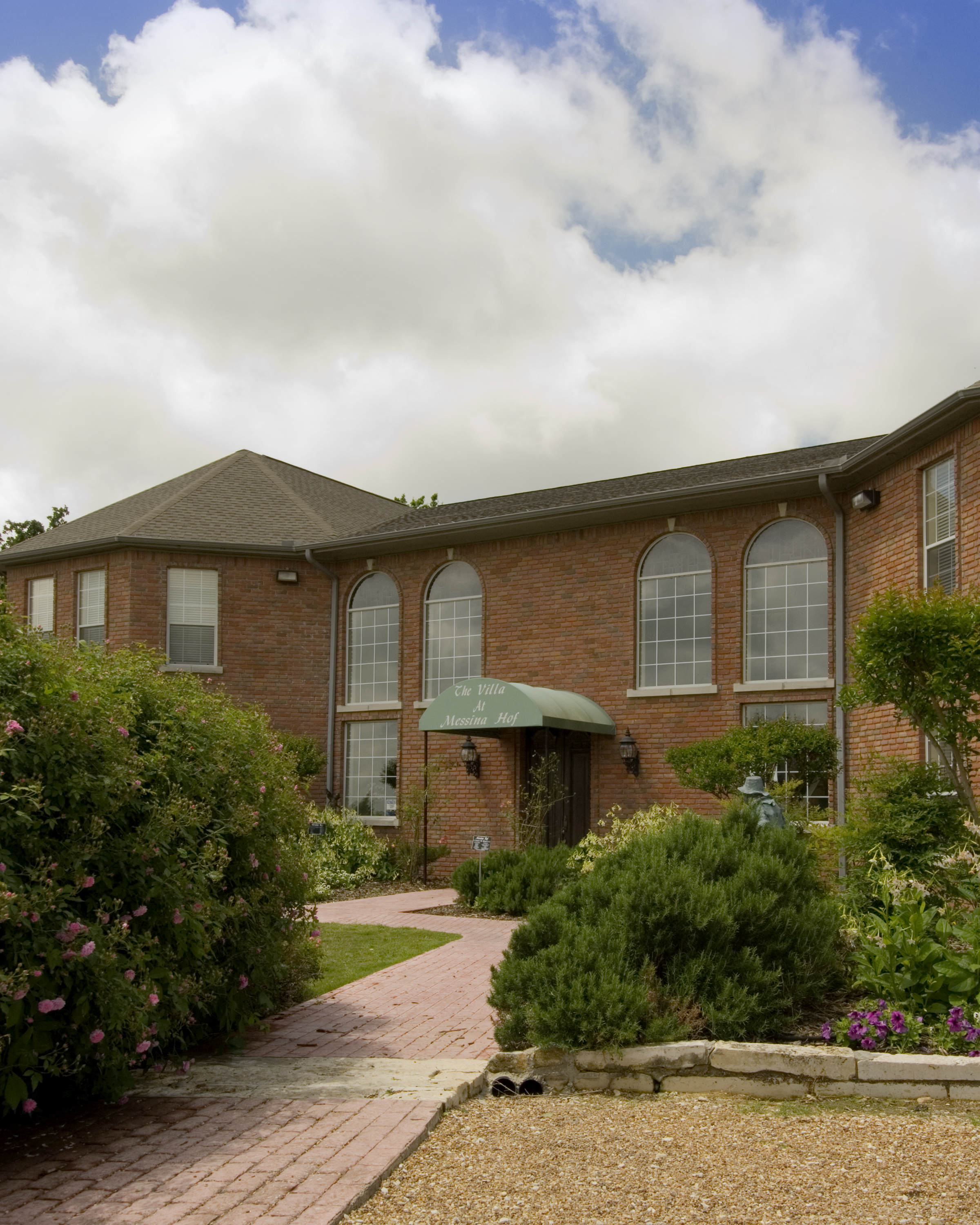
- Location: Bryan, Texas, United States

Messina Hof is a Texas-based winery that was founded by Merrill and Paul Bonarrigo in 1977, making it the third oldest winery in the state. The winery's name is derived from Messina, Sicily, and Hof, Germany, from where the families of Paul and Merrill Bonarrigo originate.

== Overview ==
Messina Hof produces 250,000 US gallons (950,000 L) of wine which is distributed over ten states and four countries from their vineyard which covers more than 250 acres (100 ha) at over 3,700 feet (1,100 m) in elevation. The vineyard grows Black Spanish, Pinot Grigio Sagrantino, and Sangiovese grapes which are all suited to the local climate, which is similar to the European wine making region of Burgundy.
