= Balar =

Balar may refer to:

- Balar, Aurangabad, a village in Aurangabad district, Bihar, India
- Balor, Balar or Bolar, leader of the Fomorians in Celtic mythology
- Balar is a most common Last name/Surname in Gujarat.
