= Château Branaire-Ducru =

Winery in the Bordeaux region of France

Coordinates: 45.1450°N 0.7388°W

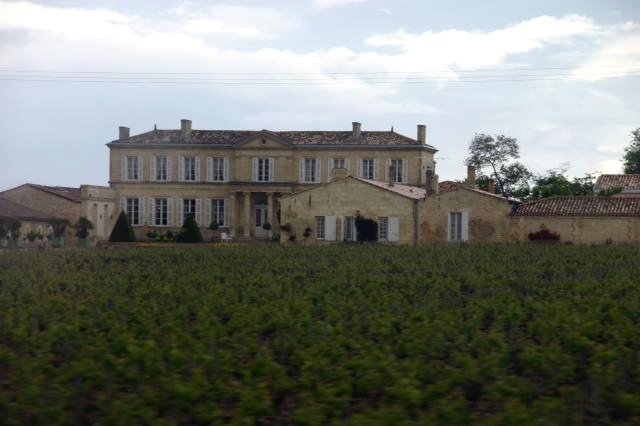
Château Branaire

Château Branaire is a winery in the Saint-Julien appellation of the Bordeaux region of France. Château Branaire is also the name of the main red wine produced by this property and which was classified as one of the ten 'Fourth Growths' (Quatrièmes Crus) in the Bordeaux Wine Official Classification of 1855.

== Vineyard ==
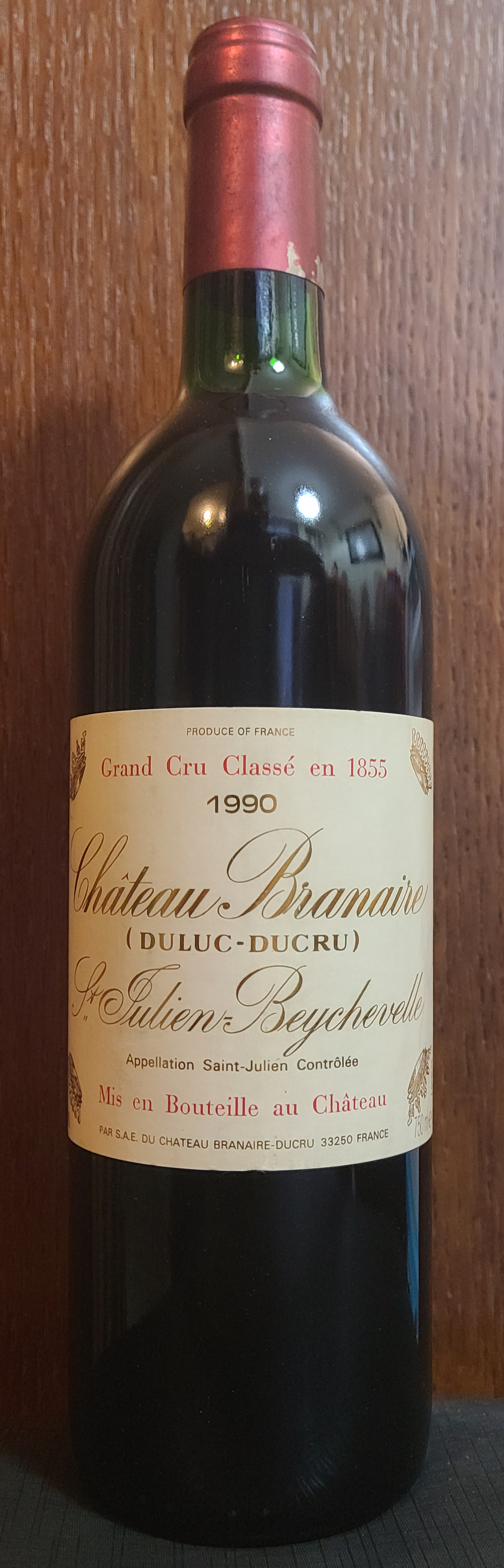
Grand Vin 1990

Although the actual château is located on the southern border of the appellation, across from Château Beychevelle, the vineyards of the estate are spread throughout Saint-Julien. In total, the vineyards cover 50 hectares (about 120 acres). The majority of plantings are devoted to Cabernet Sauvignon (70%), followed by Merlot (22%), Cabernet Franc (4%) and Petit Verdot (4%). The vines average 35 years of age and are harvested by hand.

== Wine ==
Château Branaire produces two wines:

- The grand vin Château Branaire (often referred to as Château Branaire Ducru) averages about 15,000 cases per year. Branaire uses a novel (for the area) gravity-flow style winery to minimize damage to the grapes as they are processed. The wines go through primary fermentation for about three weeks in temperature-controlled stainless-steel vats. About 1/3 of the production undergoes malolactic fermentation in new oak barrels. Once fermentation is complete the wines are transferred into oak barrels (50% new oak) for 18–24 months of aging.
- The estate also produces about 7,000 cases of its second wine, Duluc de Branaire-Ducru.
- A 1934 bottle of Château Branaire-Ducru is central to the Roald Dahl story Taste.
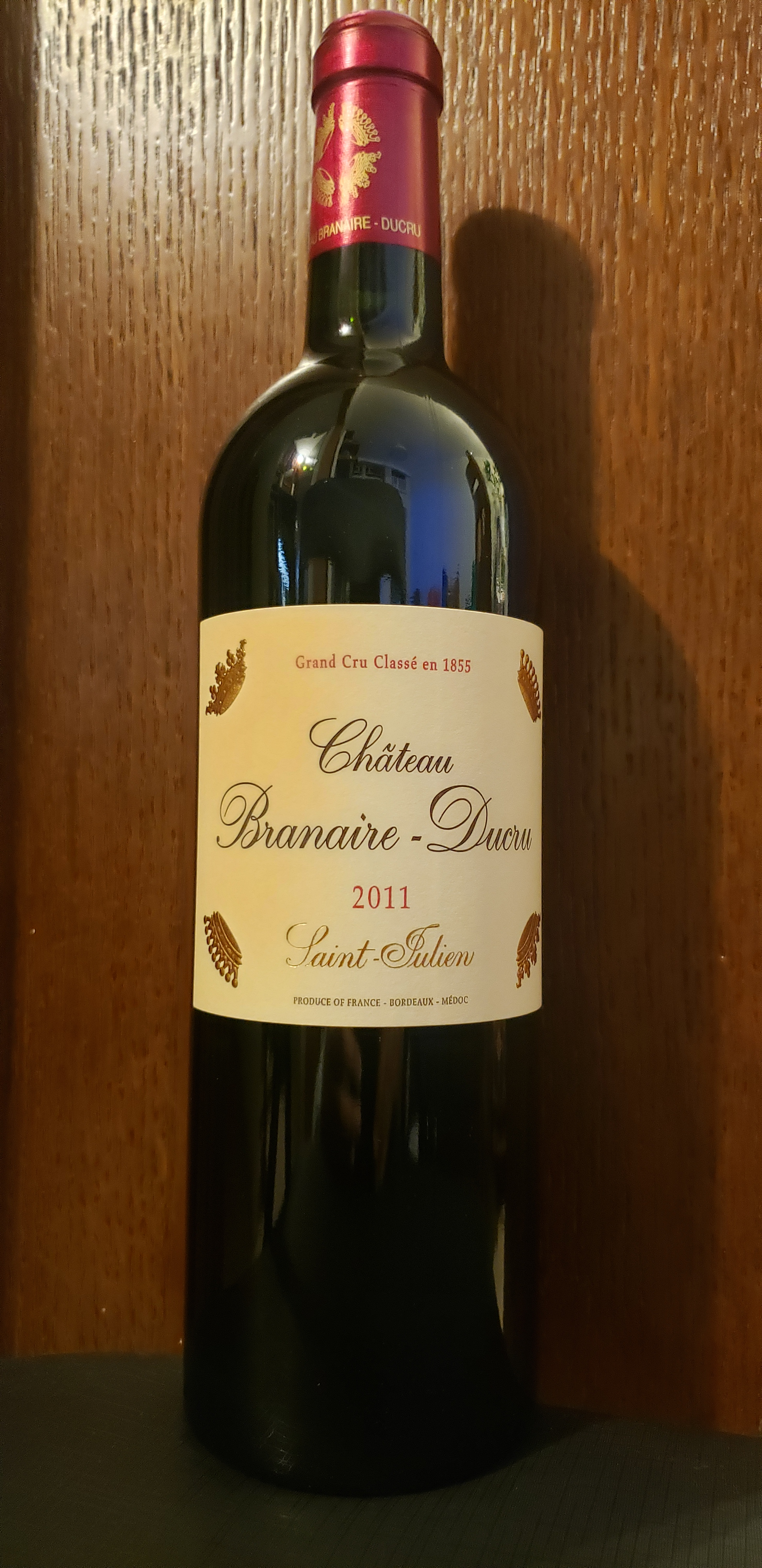
Grand Vin 2011

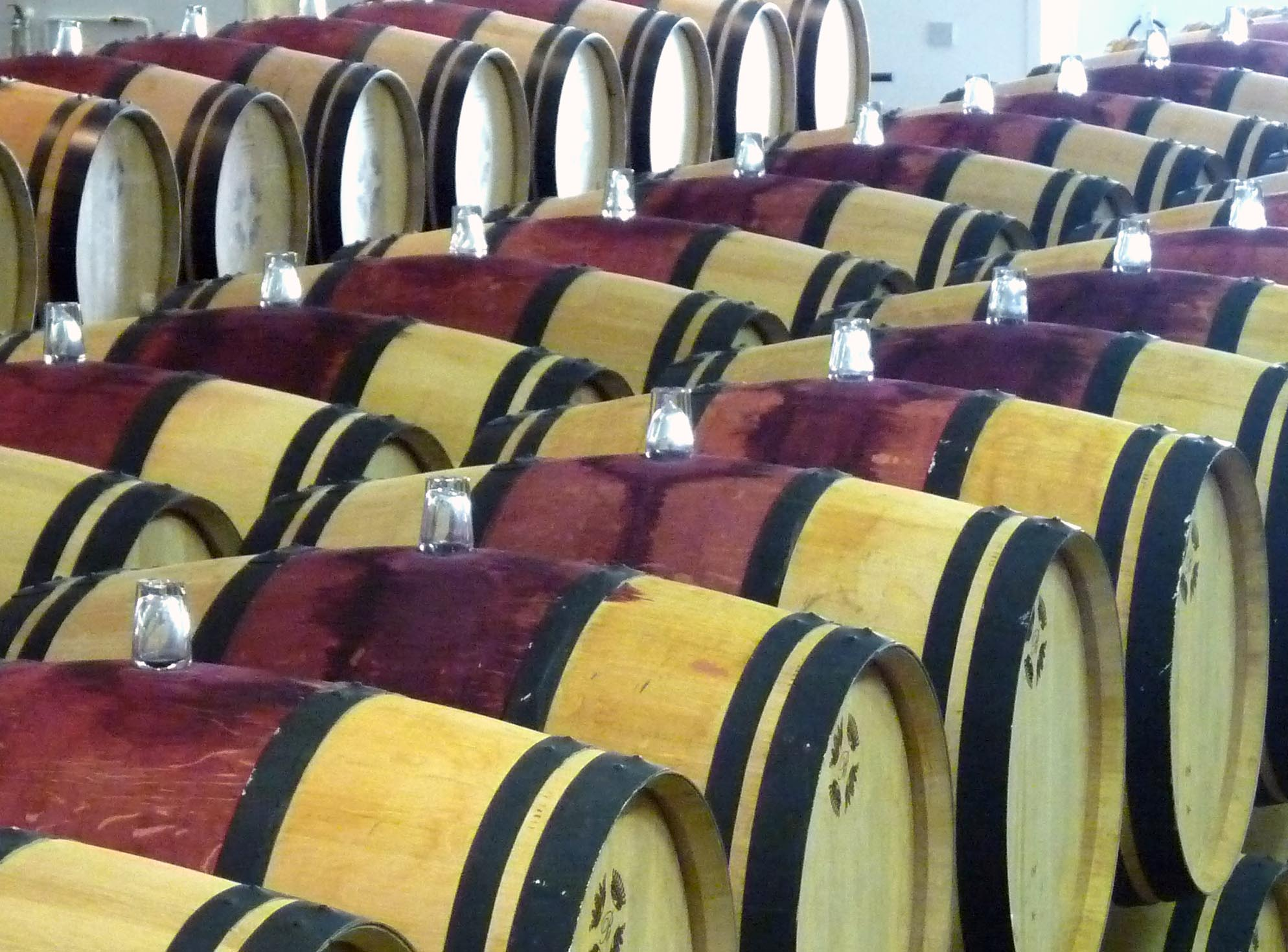
Barrel room at Château Branaire-Ducru

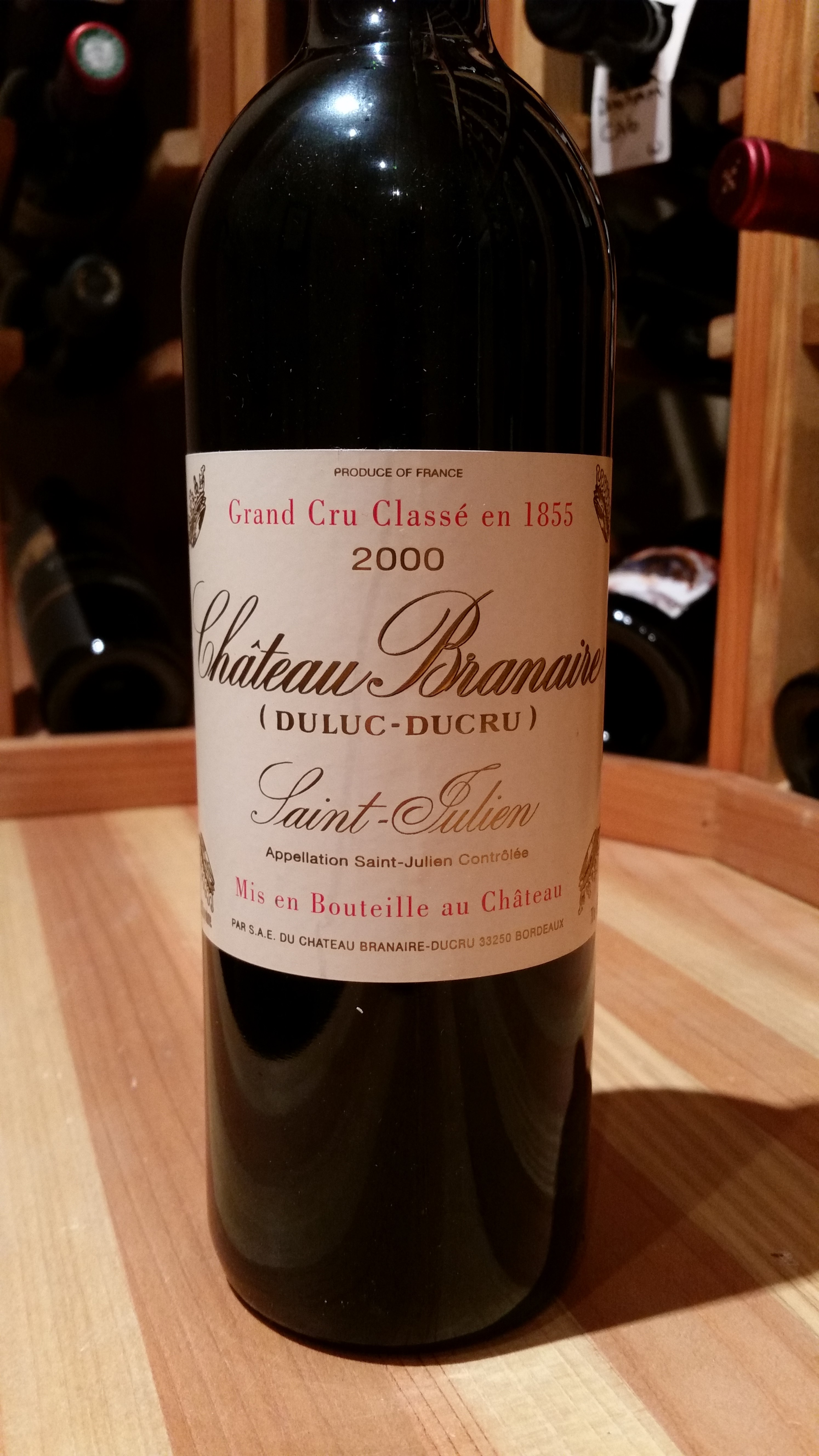
Label on bottle of 2000 vintage Château Branaire-Ducru

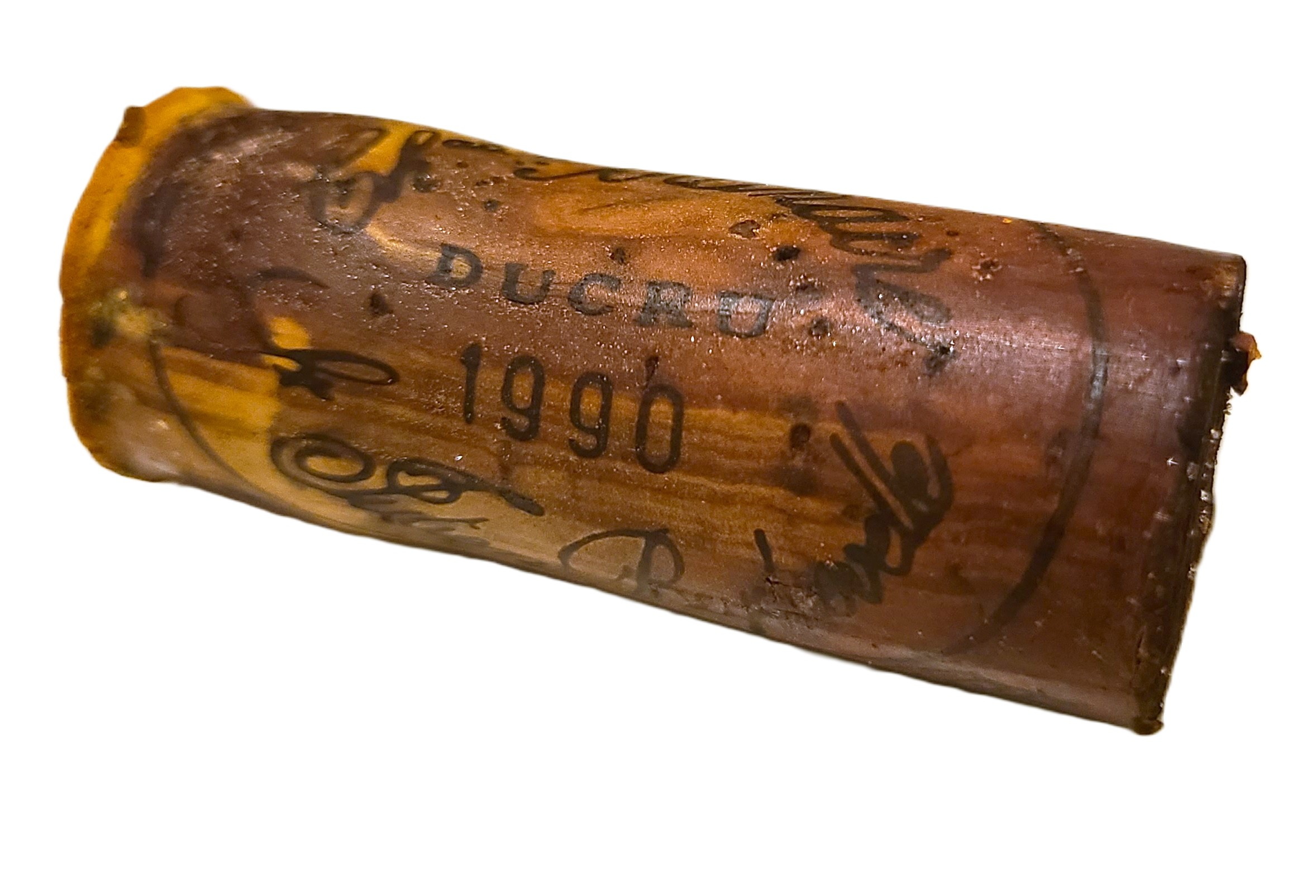
Cork of Grand Vin 1990

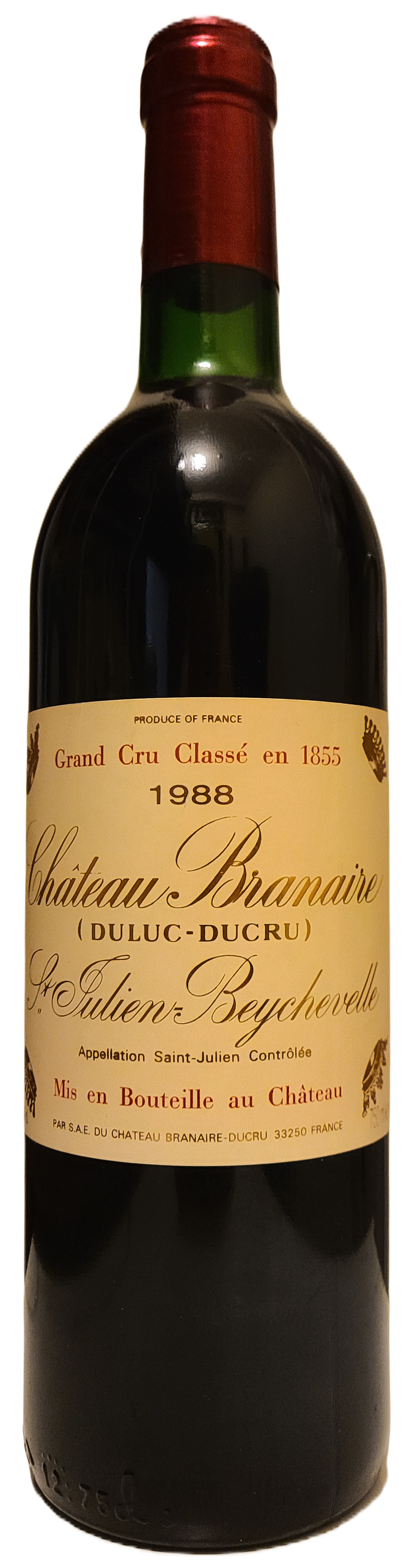
Grand Vin 1988

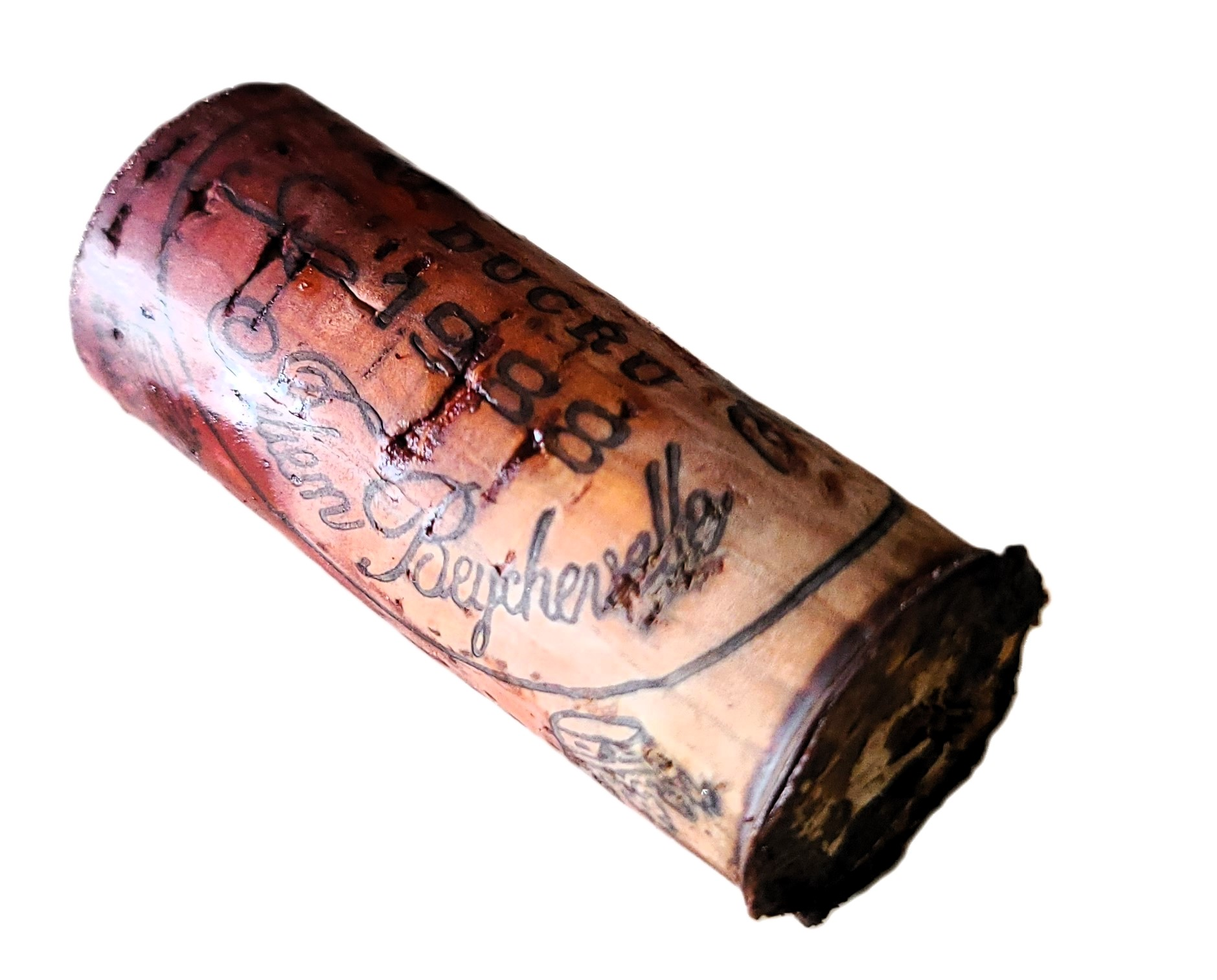
Cork of Grand Vin 1988

== See also ==
- French wine
- Bordeaux wine
