= Uco Valley =

Human settlement in Argentina

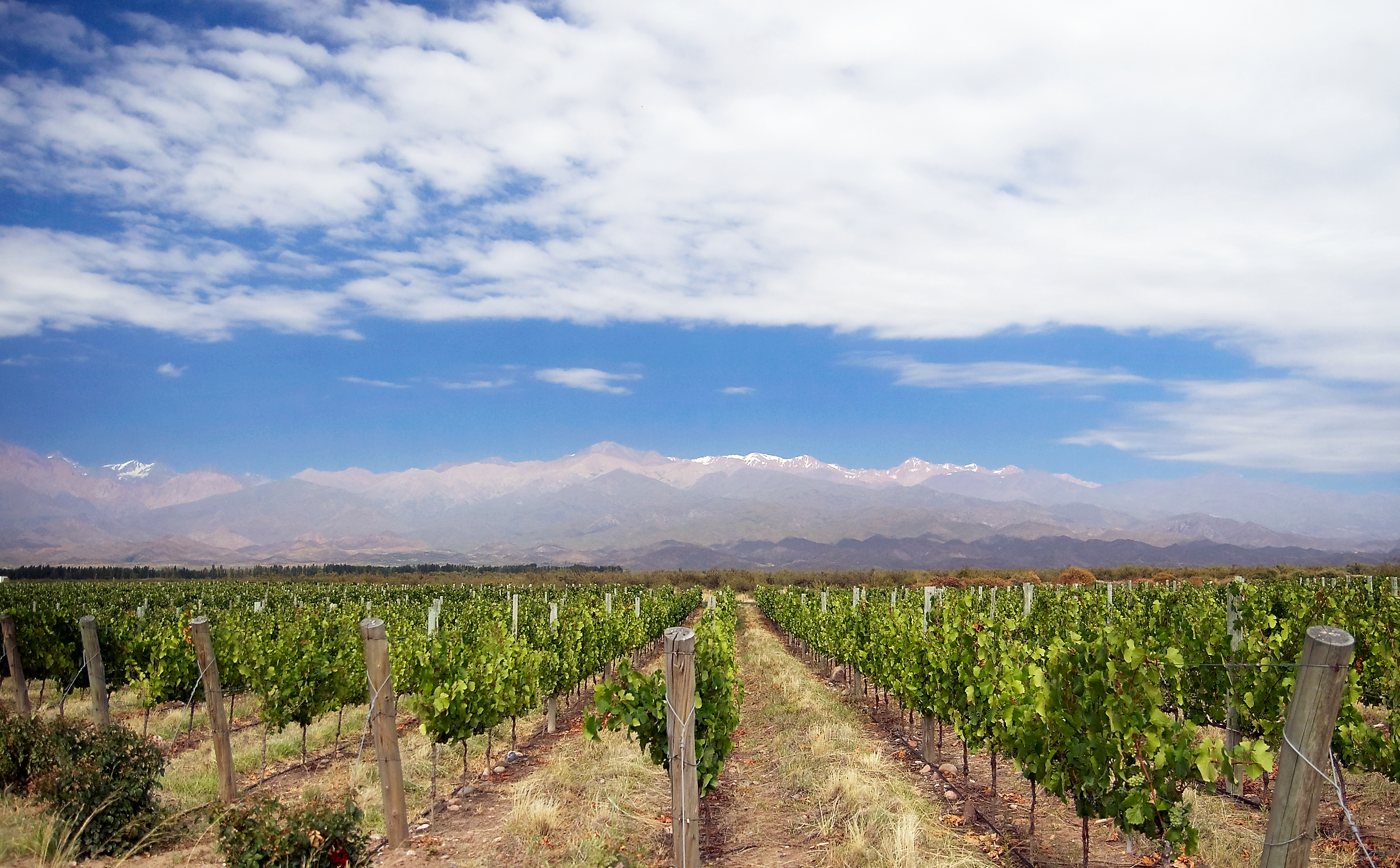
- Vineyards in the Uco Valley

- Location within Argentina

Geography
- Location: Argentina, Mendoza
- Coordinates: 33°37′S 69°08′W
- Interactive map of Uco Valley

Valle de Uco is a viticultural region southwest of Mendoza, in Argentina. Situated along the Tunuyán River, the Uco Valley is widely considered one of the top wine regions in Mendoza, and all of Argentina. The annual average temperature is 14 °C (57 °F) and altitudes range from 900–1,200 metres (3,000–3,900 ft) above sea level.

The combination of high elevation, alluvial soils, irrigation sourced from the Andes Mountains, a long growing season with over 250 sunny days a year, little rain and vast temperature differences between day and night are all conducive to growing quality wine grapes. These climate and geography elements come together to provide excellent fruit ripening and concentration, developing colors, aromas, flavors and textures resulting in wines that are deep in color, intense in aromas and rich in flavors. The Uco Valley figures prominently in the Argentina Wine Route for tourist visitors.

Traditionally, the varietals grown in this area are Sémillon and Malbec; together with Bonarda and Barbera in a smaller amount.

== Climate ==
Climate data for Valle de Uco (Temperature normals and records: 1993–2018; Precipitation normals: 1981-2010)
Month	Jan	Feb	Mar	Apr	May	Jun	Jul	Aug	Sep	Oct	Nov	Dec	Year
Record high °C (°F)	39.0 (102.2)	36.5 (97.7)	34.0 (93.2)	31.0 (87.8)	28.2 (82.8)	27.2 (81.0)	27.0 (80.6)	31.5 (88.7)	34.0 (93.2)	38.4 (101.1)	34.8 (94.6)	36.6 (97.9)	39.0 (102.2)
Mean daily maximum °C (°F)	28.8 (83.8)	26.9 (80.4)	24.4 (75.9)	19.9 (67.8)	15.9 (60.6)	13.3 (55.9)	12.9 (55.2)	14.5 (58.1)	16.9 (62.4)	20.7 (69.3)	24.6 (76.3)	27.8 (82.0)	20.6 (69.1)
Daily mean °C (°F)	21.7 (71.1)	20.0 (68.0)	17.4 (63.3)	12.9 (55.2)	9.2 (48.6)	6.5 (43.7)	5.7 (42.3)	7.4 (45.3)	10.1 (50.2)	14.0 (57.2)	17.4 (63.3)	20.5 (68.9)	13.6 (56.5)
Mean daily minimum °C (°F)	14.5 (58.1)	13.3 (55.9)	11.2 (52.2)	7.1 (44.8)	3.9 (39.0)	1.0 (33.8)	−0.3 (31.5)	1.5 (34.7)	3.8 (38.8)	7.3 (45.1)	10.0 (50.0)	12.9 (55.2)	7.2 (45.0)
Record low °C (°F)	3.8 (38.8)	2.0 (35.6)	1.5 (34.7)	−3.0 (26.6)	−9.6 (14.7)	−8.2 (17.2)	−13.6 (7.5)	−13.8 (7.2)	−5.6 (21.9)	−0.6 (30.9)	0.6 (33.1)	0.3 (32.5)	−13.8 (7.2)
Average precipitation mm (inches)	43.2 (1.70)	50.1 (1.97)	52.1 (2.05)	30.9 (1.22)	29.4 (1.16)	29.0 (1.14)	37.3 (1.47)	30.2 (1.19)	40.4 (1.59)	41.8 (1.65)	40.1 (1.58)	42.0 (1.65)	466.3 (18.36)
Source: Red Hidrológica Nacional
