= Alberto Antonini =

Italian oenologist and winery consultant

Alberto Antonini (born 10 June 1959) is an Italian oenologist and grower-producer, as well as a consultant to a large number of wineries in various countries including Italy, the U.S., Argentina, Canada, Chile, Uruguay, Armenia and Australia.

== Career ==
Alberto Antonini was born in Empoli near Florence, Tuscany. His education included a Doctorate in Agricultural Studies from the University of Florence and an oenology degree in Bordeaux and at the University of California, Davis.

He lives with his wife Alessandra and their three children Angelica, Margherita and Carlo on his family estate “Poggiotondo” in Cerreto Guidi (near Florence in Tuscany). His career after his university studies started as an assistant winemaker at Frescobaldi Frescobaldi Winery and then as technical director at the Col D’Orcia Winery in Montalcino. Afterwards, he was named Head Winemaker at the Antinori Antinori Winery before starting his own consulting business in 1997. In 2013 “The Drinks Business” Magazine ranked him among the Top 5 Wine Consultants in the world, and in 2015 “Decanter” Magazine ranked him again in the top 5 Wine Consultants in his professional category.

He is cited as a key player in helping Argentine Malbec wines gain international appreciation and reputation. He is also playing an important role in helping and encouraging wine producers in different viticultural regions to overcome the colonization of the Bordeaux recipe and go back to traditional, indigenous grape varieties and local winemaking techniques, focusing on authentic, pure, terroir-driven wines.

== See also ==
- List of wine personalities
- Globalization of wine
