= Malbec =

Wine variety

- Grape (Vitis)
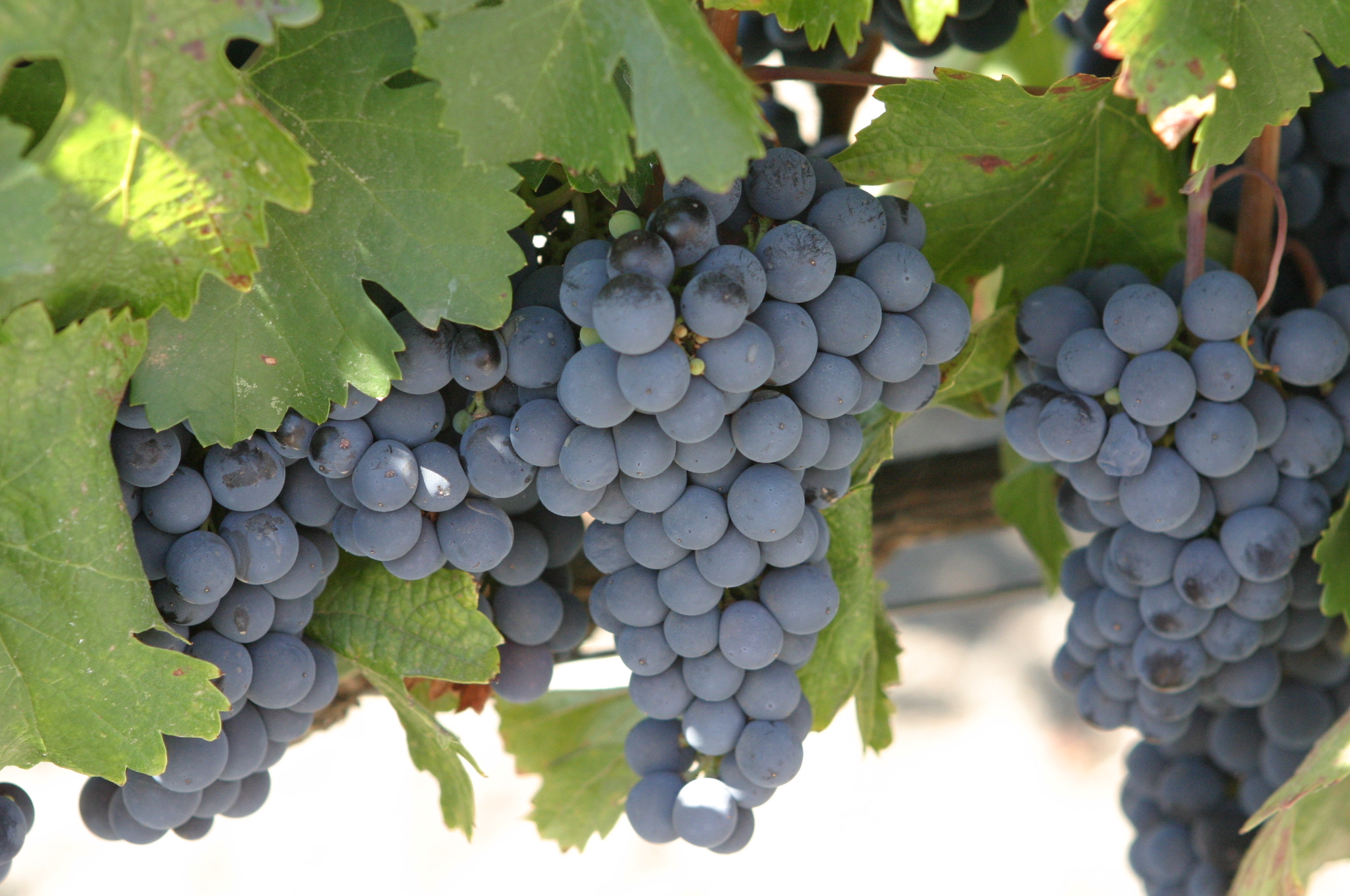
- Malbec grapes
- Color of berry skin: Black
- Species: Vitis vinifera
- Also called: Auxerrois in Cahors, Côt, Pressac (more)
- Origin: France
- Notable regions: Argentina, Cahors
- VIVC number: 2889

Malbec (French pronunciation: [malbɛk]) is a purple grape variety used in making red wine. The grapes tend to have an inky dark color and robust tannins, and are known as one of the six grapes allowed in the blend of red Bordeaux wine. In France, plantations of Malbec are now found primarily in Cahors in South West France, though the grape is grown worldwide. It is also available as an Argentine varietal.

The grape became less popular in Bordeaux after 1956 when frost killed off 75% of the crop. Despite Cahors being hit by the same frost, which devastated the vineyards, Malbec was replanted and continued to be popular in that area. Winemakers in the region frequently mixed Malbec with Merlot and Tannat to make dark, full-bodied wines, but have ventured into 100% Malbec varietal wines more recently.

A popular but unconfirmed theory claims that Malbec is named after a Hungarian peasant who first spread the grape variety throughout France. French ampelographer and viticulturalist Pierre Galet notes, however, that most evidence suggests that Côt was the variety's original name and that it probably originated in northern Burgundy. Due to similarities in synonyms, Malbec is often confused with other varieties of grape. Malbec argenté is not Malbec, but rather a variety of the southwestern French grape Abouriou. In Cahors, the Malbec grape is referred to as Auxerrois or Côt Noir; this is sometimes confused with Auxerrois blanc, which is an entirely different variety.

The Malbec grape is a thick-skinned grape and needs more sun and heat than either Cabernet Sauvignon or Merlot to mature. It ripens mid-season and can bring very deep color, ample tannin, and a particular plum-like flavor component which adds complexity to claret blends. Sometimes, especially in its traditional growing regions, it is not trellised but is instead cultivated as bush vines (the goblet system). In such cases, it is sometimes kept to a relatively low yield of about 6 tons per hectare. Wines produced using this growing method are rich, dark, and juicy.

As a varietal, Malbec creates a rather inky red (or violet), intense wine, so it is also commonly used in blends, such as with Merlot and Cabernet Sauvignon to create the red French Bordeaux claret blend. The grape is blended with Cabernet Franc and Gamay in some regions such as the Loire Valley. Other wine regions use the grape to produce Bordeaux-style blends. The varietal is sensitive to frost and has a propensity for shattering or coulure.

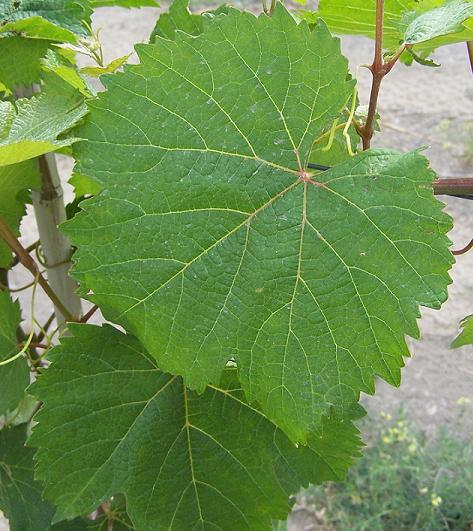
Malbec leaves

== Viticulture ==
Malbec is very susceptible to various grape diseases and viticultural hazards—most notably frost, coulure, downy mildew, and rot— but the development of new clones and vineyard management techniques have helped control some of these potential problems. When it is not afflicted with these various ailments, particularly coulure, it does have the potential to produce high yields. Malbec seems to be able to produce well in a variety of soil types but in the limestone based soils of Cahors it seems to produce its most dark and tannic manifestation. There are distinct ampelographical differences in the clones of Malbec found in France and in Argentina, with Argentine Malbec tending to have smaller berries.

A comparative research study conducted by the Catena Institute of Wine and University of California, Davis, examined the difference between the phenolic composition of Malbec wines from California and Mendoza, Argentina. Sixteen vineyards in California and twenty-six blocks in Mendoza were selected based on their uniformity and regional representativeness. The study concluded that there are distinct flavor and compositional differences in Malbec wines produced in Mendoza and California.

== Regions ==
Malbec is the dominant red variety in Cahors where the Appellation Controlée regulations for Cahors require a minimum content of 70%. Introduced to Argentina by French agricultural engineer Michel Pouget in 1868, Malbec is now widely planted in Argentina. Grapes from this region produce softer, less tannic-driven wines than those from Cahors. There were once 50,000 hectares planted with Malbec in Argentina; now there are 25,000 hectares in Mendoza alone, in addition to production in La Rioja, Salta, San Juan, Catamarca and Buenos Aires.

Chile has 2,361 hectares planted with Malbec, the main places are Colchagua Valley in O'Higgins Region, Maule Region and Bio-Bio Region. In California the grape is used to make Meritage. Malbec is also grown in Washington State, the Rogue and Umpqua regions of Oregon, the Grand Valley AVA of Colorado, Australia, New Zealand, South Africa, Brazil, British Columbia, the Long Island AVA of New York, southern Bolivia, Peru, northeastern Italy and recently in Texas and southern Ontario, Virginia, and in the Baja California region of Mexico.

=== France ===
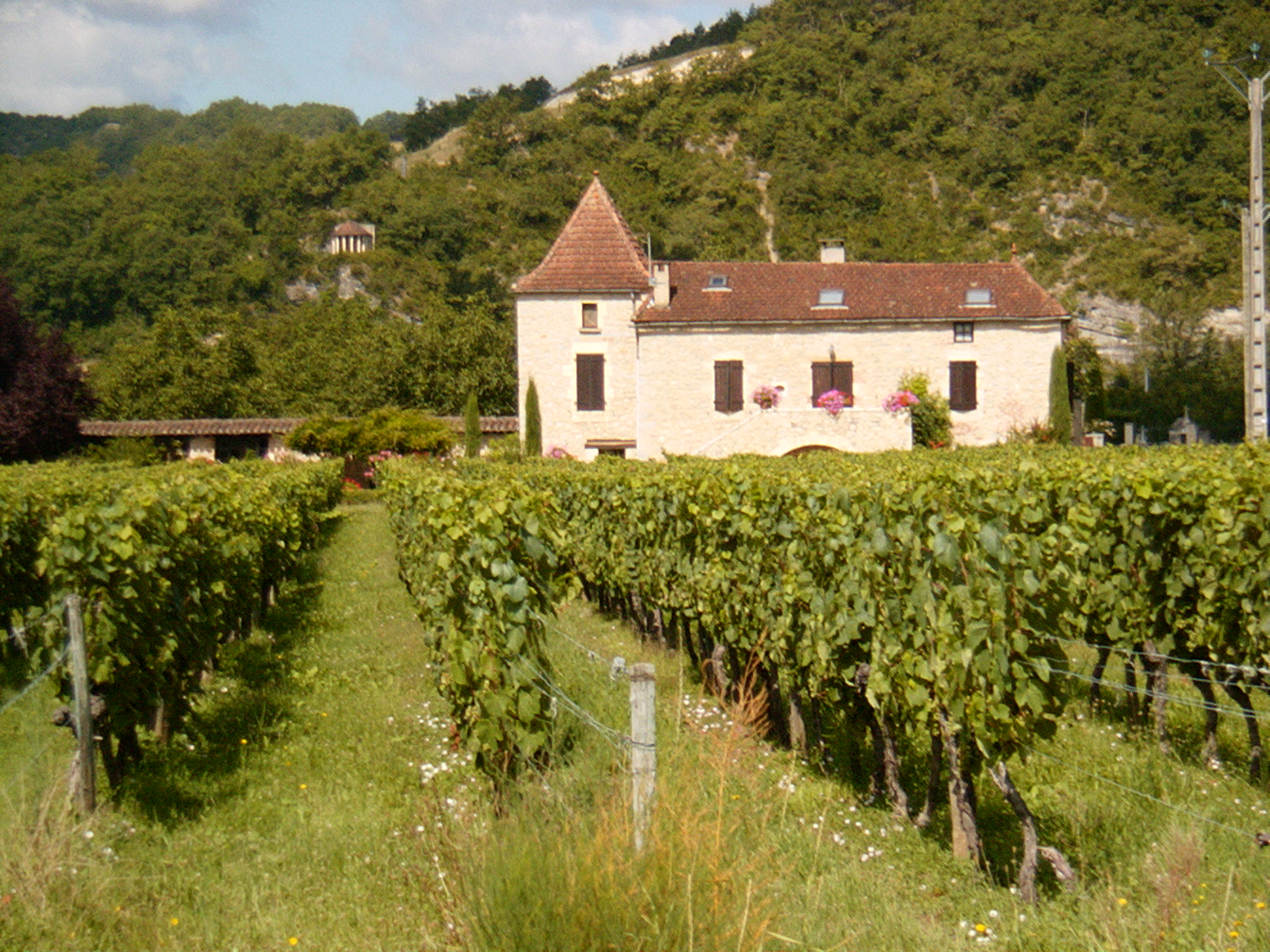
A vineyard in Cahors

At one point Malbec was grown in 30 different departments of France, a legacy that is still present in the list of local synonyms for the variety, which easily surpasses 1000 names. In recent times, however, the popularity of the variety has been steadily declining with a 2000 census reporting only 15,000 acres (6,100 hectares) of the vine, which are mostly consigned to the southwestern part of the country. Its stronghold remains Cahors where Appellation d'origine contrôlée (AOC) regulations stipulates that Malbec must compose at least 70% of the blend, with Merlot and Tannat rounding out the remaining percentage. Outside of Cahors, Malbec is still found in small amounts as a permitted variety in the AOCs of Bergerac, Buzet, Côtes de Duras, Côtes du Marmandais, Fronton and Pécharmant. It is also permitted in the Vin Délimité de Qualité Supérieure (VDQS) of Côtes du Brulhois. In Le Midi region of the Languedoc, it is permitted (but rarely grown) in the AOC regions of Cabardès and Côtes de Malepère. There is a small amount of Malbec grown in the middle Loire Valley and permitted in the AOCs of Anjou, Coteaux du Loir, Touraine and the sparkling wine AOC of Saumur where it is blended with Cabernet Sauvignon and Gamay. Still, as elsewhere in France, Malbec is losing acreage to other varieties—most notably Cabernet Franc in the Loire.

Though the grape was historically a major planting in Bordeaux, providing color and fruit to its blends, in the 20th century it started to lose ground to Merlot and Cabernet Franc. This was due, in part, to its vulnerabilities to so many different vine ailments (coulure, downy mildew, frost). The severe 1956 frost wiped out a significant portion of Malbec vines in Bordeaux, allowing many growers a chance to start anew with different varieties. By 1968, plantings in the Libournais were down to 4,900 hectares (12,100 acres) and fell further to 1,400 hectares (3,460 acres) by 2000. While Malbec has since become a popular component of New World meritages or Bordeaux blends, and although it is still a permitted variety in all major wine regions of Bordeaux, its presence in Bordeaux has dwindled; the only significant plantings are in the regions of the Côtes-de-Bourg, Blaye and Entre-Deux-Mers.

=== Argentina ===
While acreage of the Malbec is declining in France, in Argentina the grape is surging and has become a "national variety" of a sort that is uniquely identified with Argentine wine. The grape was first introduced to the region in the mid-19th century when provincial governor Domingo Faustino Sarmiento instructed the French agronomist Michel Pouget to bring grapevine cuttings from France to Argentina. Among the vines that Pouget brought were the very first Malbec vines to be planted in the country. During the economic turmoil of the 20th century, some plantings of Malbec were pulled out to make way for the jug wine producing varieties of Criolla Grande and Cereza. The grape was rediscovered in the late 20th century as the Argentine wine industry shifted its focus to premium wine production for export. As the Argentine wine industry discovered the unique quality of wine that could be made from the grape, Malbec arose to greater prominence and is today the most widely planted red grape variety in the country. As of 2003 there were over 20,000 hectares (50,000 acres) of Malbec in Argentina. The Mendoza region is the leading producer of Malbec in Argentina with plantings found throughout the country in places such as La Rioja, Salta, San Juan, Catamarca, Rio Negro, Neuquen, Chubut, and Buenos Aires.

The grape clusters of Argentine Malbec are different from its French relatives, having smaller berries in tighter, smaller clusters. This suggests that the cuttings brought over by Pouget and later French immigrants were a unique clone that may have gone extinct in France due to frost and the phylloxera epidemic. Argentine Malbec wine is characterized by its deep color and intense fruity flavors with a velvety texture. While they lack the tannic structure of French Malbecs, being more plush in texture, Argentine Malbecs have shown aging potential similar to their French counterparts.

==== High altitude Mendoza Malbec ====
Argentina's most highly rated Malbec wines originate from Mendoza's high altitude wine regions of Luján de Cuyo and the Uco Valley. These districts are located in the foothills of the Andes Mountains between 800 m and 1500 m elevation (2,800 to 5,000 feet).

Argentine vintner Nicolás Catena Zapata has been widely credited for elevating the status of Argentine Malbec and the Mendoza region through serious experimentation into the effects of high altitude. In 1994, he was the first to plant a Malbec vineyard at almost 1500 m (5,000 feet) elevation in the Gualtallary sub-district of Tupungato, the Adrianna Vineyard. He was also the first to develop a clonal selection of Argentine Malbec.

High-altitude Mendoza has attracted many notable foreign winemakers, such as Paul Hobbs, Michel Rolland, Herve Joyaux-Fabre, Roberto Cipresso and Alberto Antonini. Today, there are several Malbecs from the region scoring over 95 points in Wine Spectator and Robert Parker's The Wine Advocate.

=== Chile ===
Although Carménère is the emblematic strain of Chilean wine and other varieties of strains such as Cabernet Sauvignon, Merlot, Pinot noir among others are harvested in the country, Malbec has experienced exponential growth in its production during the last decades, due to the discovery of hundred-year-old vines of the variety, as well as the year-on-year increase in hectares planted for its exclusive production in the country. It is currently estimated that in Chile there are 2,361 hectares dedicated exclusively to the production of Malbec.

The history of malbec in Chile begins in 1841, when a group of French winemakers brought the vine to the country, along with other varieties to be planted in the Quinta Normal of Santiago, later in 1853 the first malbec strains would be exported from Chile to Argentina, specifically to the Mendoza region.

At the end of the century XIX, French winemakers began to expand Malbec plantations to other regions of the central-south zone of Chile, however they mixed them with other varieties, so the production of Malbec gradually faded over the years, as was the case in the Maule Region, since centenary Malbec vines that had been mixed with other vines were discovered a few years ago in the area. It was not until 1993 that the Viu Manent vineyard became the first Chilean winery to produce, bottle and market 100% Malbec wines produced in the country, from the vineyard they had for more than 100 years in the city of Santa Cruz in the Colchagua where this variety was found. In 2016, a hundred-year-old Malbec plantation was also discovered in the city of San Rosendo, in the Biobío Region, which was brought to the area by French settlers at the end of the 19th century, which had also been blended with other vines from the area.

Currently, the largest amount of Malbec production in Chile is located in the Maule Region, however there are also important plantations of the strain in the Biobío regions and in the Colchagua Valley area. The Terroir of the Maule Region is granitic, which causes the malbec of the area to contain a special minerality, in addition the influence of the coast and the mountains give acidity and freshness to the Chilean malbec, these conditions cause an important difference in its par Also, Chilean Malbec tends to have a fresher and more fruity flavor, because it is not harvested as ripe as other Malbec productions in the world.

=== United States ===
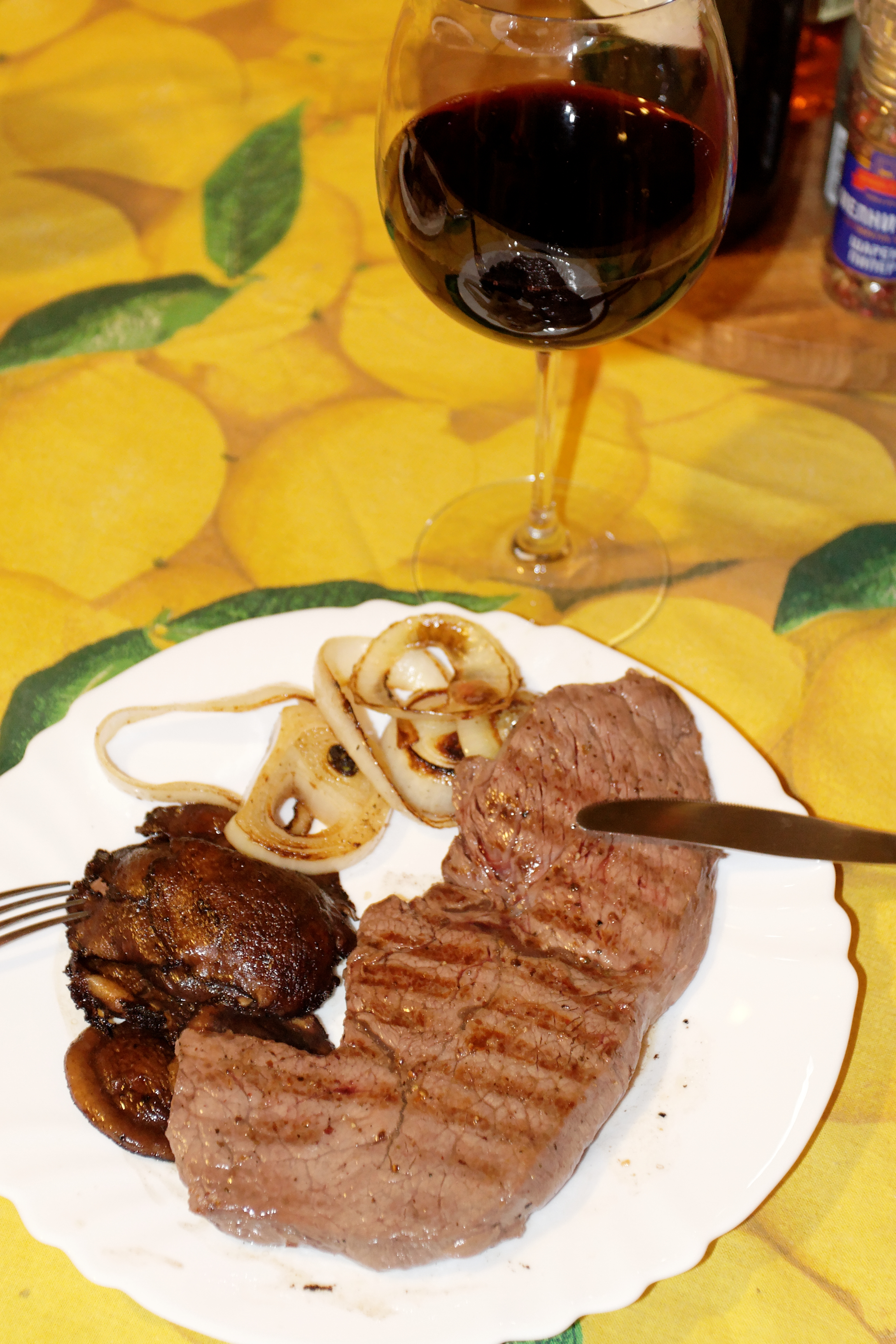
Malbec paired with a steak

Prior to Prohibition in the United States, Malbec was a significant variety in California used mainly for blended bulk wine production. After Prohibition, the grape was a minor variety until it experienced a surge of interest as a component of "Meritage" Bordeaux-style blends in the mid-1990s. Between 1995 and 2003, plantings of Malbec in California increased from 404 hectares (1,000 acres) to more than 2,830 hectares (7000 acres). While the appearance of Californian varietal Malbec is increasing, the grape is still most widely used for blending. In California, the American Viticultural Areas (AVA) with the most plantings of Malbec include Napa Valley, Alexander Valley, Paso Robles and Sonoma Valley.

Other regions in California with some plantings of Malbec include Livermore Valley, Atlas Peak, Carmel Valley, Los Carneros, Ramona Valley, Central Coast, Red Hills Lake County, Chalk Hill, Clear Lake, Diamond Mountain District, Russian River Valley, Dry Creek Valley, Rutherford, El Dorado, San Lucas, Santa Clara Valley, Santa Cruz Mountains, Santa Lucia Highlands, Santa Maria Valley, Santa Ynez Valley, Howell Mountain, Sierra Foothills, Knights Valley, Spring Mountain District, St. Helena, Lodi, Stags Leap District, Madera, Suisun Valley, Temecula Valley, Monterey, Mount Veeder, North Coast, Oak Knoll District, Yorkville Highlands, Oakville, Paicines, Clements Hills, Fair Play, Willow Creek, North Yuba, and Yountville.

Seven Hills Winery planted the first vines of Malbec planted in Oregon state in the late 1990s in their Windrow vineyard in the Walla Walla Valley. Since the turn of the 21st century, several wineries have been experimenting with 100% varietal Malbec as well as using the variety in Meritage blends. In Washington state it is grown predominately in the Columbia Valley and the sub-AVAs of Walla Walla Valley, Rattlesnake Hills, Red Mountain, Wahluke Slope, Horse Heaven Hills and Yakima Valley. Elsewhere in Washington State, Malbec is planted in the Lake Chelan AVA where it has consistently produced wines of exceptional quality.

Other AVAs in the United States producing Malbec include the Ohio appellation of Grand River Valley, the New York appellations of North Fork of Long Island and Finger Lakes; the Oregon appellations of Applegate Valley, Rogue Valley, Southern Oregon, Umpqua Valley and Willamette Valley; the Idaho appellation of the Snake River Valley; the Texas appellations of Texas High Plains and Texas Hill Country; the Virginia appellations of Monticello and North Fork of Roanoke; the North Carolina appellation of the Yadkin Valley; the Michigan appellations of the Old Mission Peninsula and Leelanau Peninsula; the New Jersey appellation of the Outer Coastal Plain and the high altitude, Colorado appellation of the Grand Valley. Additionally, there are some plantings in Missouri and Georgia outside of federally delineated appellations.

=== Other regions ===
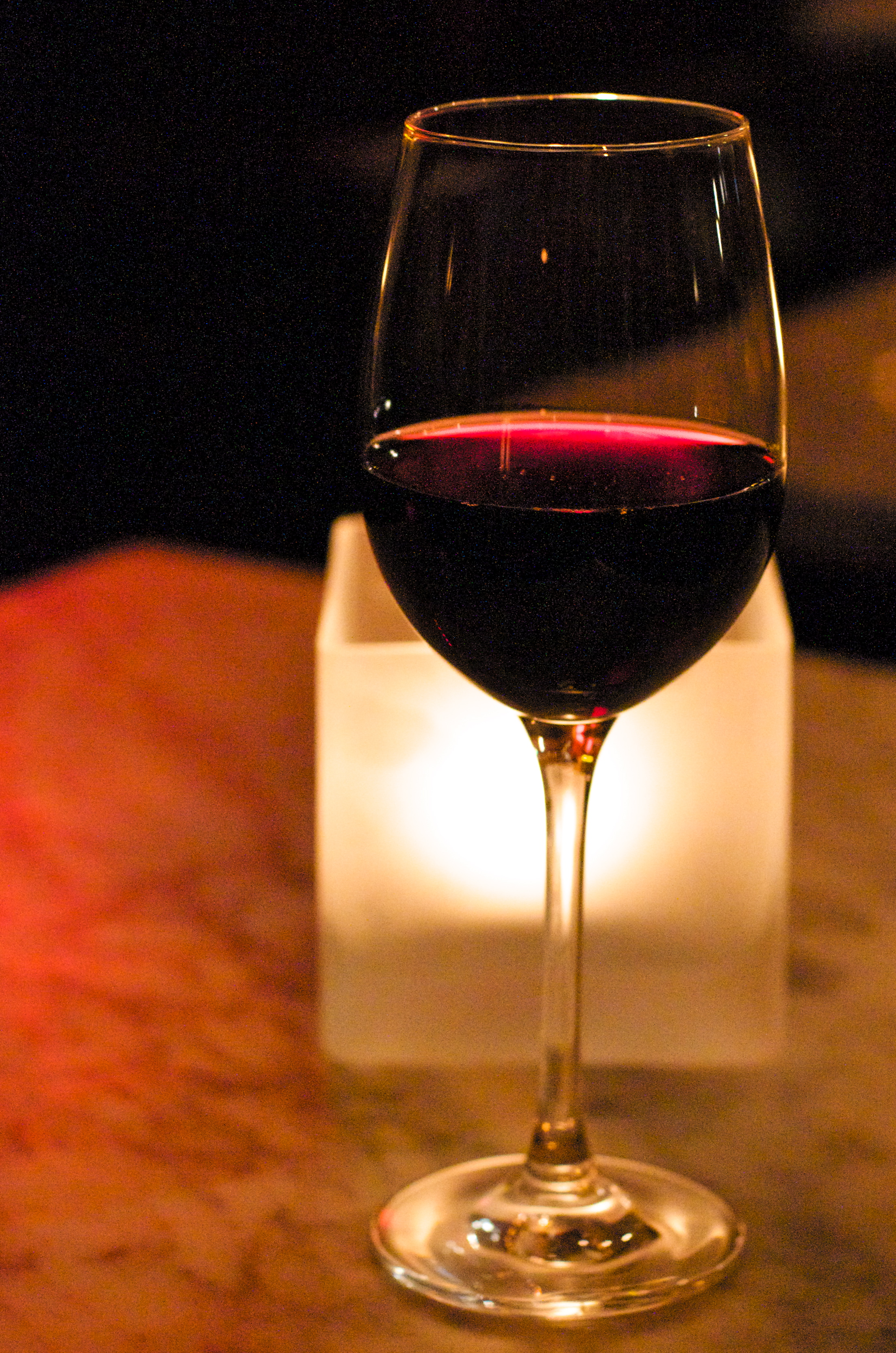
Malbec is characterized by its dark coloring.

The success of Malbec led some producers in Chile to try their hand at the varietal. Grown throughout the Central Valley, Chilean Malbec tends to be more tannic than its counterpart and is used primarily in Bordeaux-style blends. In 2016 a budget-priced La Moneda Reserve Malbec from the UK supermarket chain Asda won the Platinum Best in Show prize in a blind tasting at the Decanter World Wine awards.

The grapevine was introduced to Australia in the 19th century and was mostly a bulk wine producing grape. The particular clones planted in Australia were of poor quality and highly susceptible to coulure, frost and downy mildew. By the mid to late 20th century, many acres of Malbec were uprooted and planted with different varieties. By 2000, there were slightly over 1,235 acres (500 hectares), with the Clare Valley and Langhorne Creek having the most significant amount. As newer clones become available, plantings of Malbec in Australia have increased slightly.

Other regions with some plantings of Malbec include Northern Italy, New Zealand, Brazil, South Africa, British Columbia, Ontario, Peru, Bolivia, Mexico, Southern Indiana, and Israel.

== Wine ==
Wine expert Jancis Robinson describes the French style of Malbec common in the Libournais (Bordeaux region) as a "rustic" version of Merlot, softer in tannins and lower in acidity with blackberry fruit in its youth. The Malbec of the Cahors region is much more tannic with more phenolic compounds that contribute to its dark color. Oz Clarke describes Cahors' Malbec as dark purple in color with aromas of damsons, tobacco, garlic, and raisin. In Argentina, Malbec becomes softer with a plusher texture and riper tannins. The wines tend to have juicy fruit notes with violet aromas. In very warm regions of Argentina and Australia, the acidity of the wine may be too low which can cause a wine to taste flabby and weak. Malbec grown in Washington state tends to be characterized by dark fruit notes and herbal aromas. An exception to this in Washington State is Malbec grown in the high desert Lake Chelan AVA terroir. Malbec grapes grown in the glacial soils found within the Lake Chelan AVA produce wines possessing ripe raspberry - black fruit aromas and flavors with moderate acidity and tannins. The C R Sandidge Purtteman and Tsillan Cellars estate vineyards are known to produce stellar Malbec wines.

== Synonyms ==
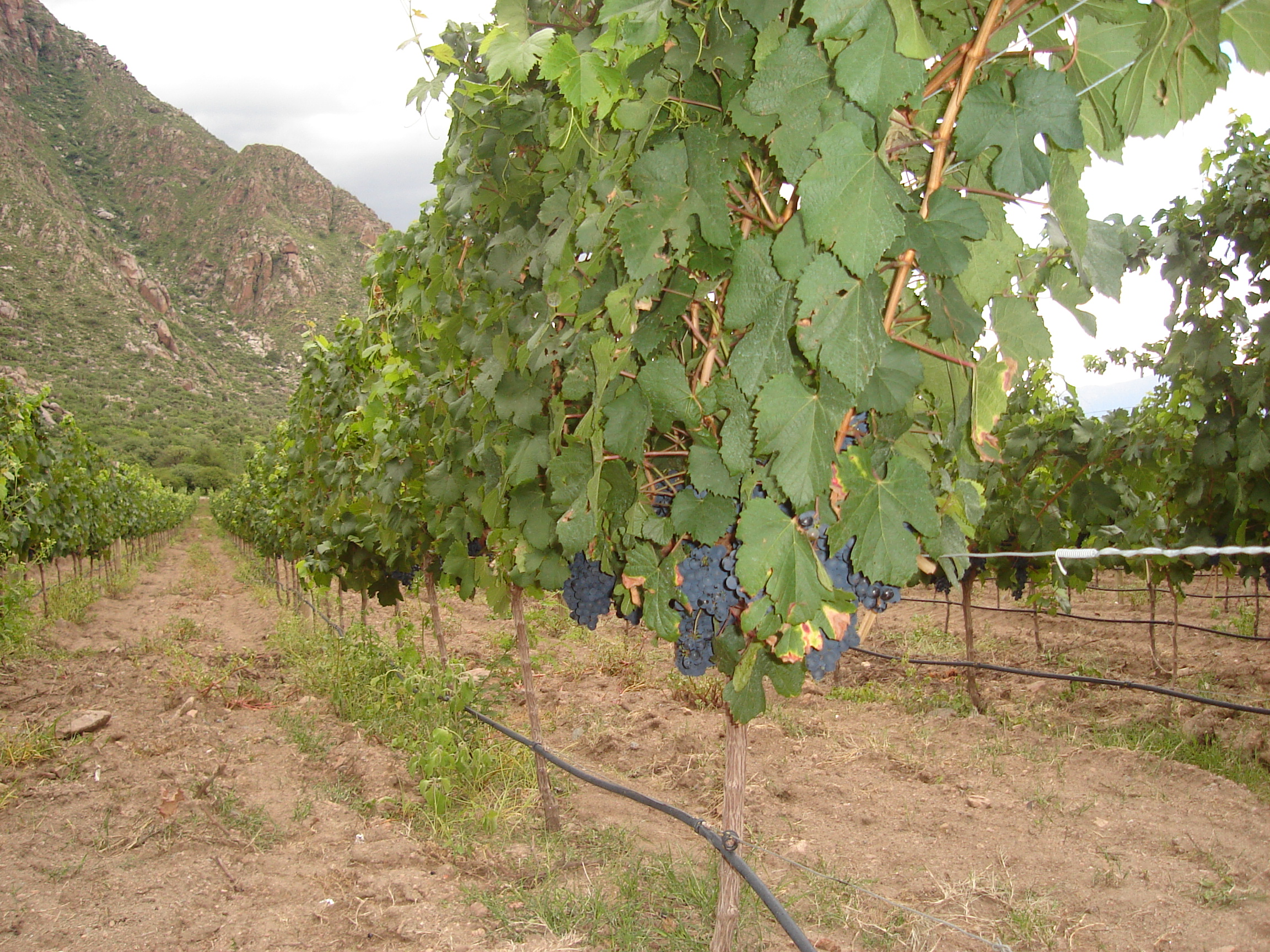
Malbec grapes growing in Cafayate, Argentina

The French ampelographer Pierre Galet has documented over a thousand different synonyms for Malbec, stemming in part from its peak period when it was growing in 30 different departments of France. While Malbec is the name most commonly known to wine drinkers, Galet suggest that Côt was most likely the grape variety's original name and the frequent appearance of Auxerrois as a synonym suggests the northern reaches of Burgundy as being the possible home of the varietal. In Bordeaux, where the variety first gained attention, it was known under the synonym Pressac.

Other common synonyms for Malbec include Agreste, Auxerrois, Auxerrois De Laquenexy, Auxerrois Des Moines De Picpus, Auxerrois Du Mans, Balouzat, Beran, Blanc De Kienzheim, Cahors, Calarin, Cauli, Costa Rosa, Côt, Cot A Queue Verte, Cotes Rouges, Doux Noir, Estrangey, Gourdaux, Grelot De Tours, Grifforin, Guillan, Hourcat, Jacobain, Luckens, Magret, Malbek, Medoc Noir, Mouranne, Navarien, Negre De Prechac, Negrera, Noir De Chartres, Noir De Pressac, Noir Doux, Nyar De Presak, Parde, Périgord, Pied De Perdrix, Pied Noir, Pied Rouge, Pied Rouget, Piperdy, Plant D'Arles, Plant De Meraou, Plant du Lot, Plant Du Roi, Prechat, Pressac, Prunieral, Quercy, Queue Rouge, Quille De Coy, Romieu, Teinturin, Terranis, Vesparo.

== See also ==
- Malbec World Day
- Cahors wine
