= Malbec World Day =

Annual Argentinian observance

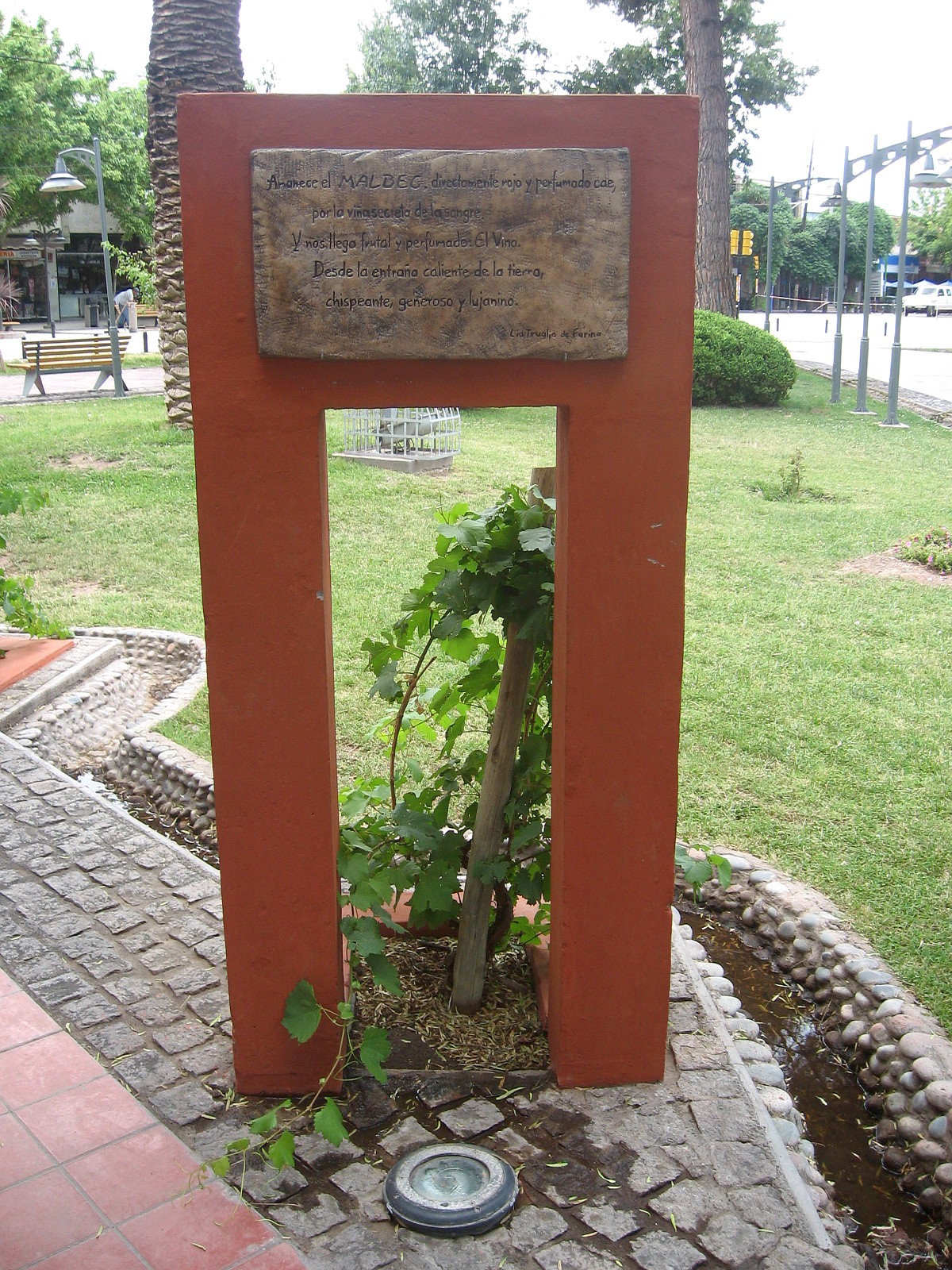
A Malbec vine in Mendoza, Argentina

Malbec World Day is an annual observance celebrated on April 17, to commemorate the day on which President Domingo Faustino Sarmiento of Argentina officially made it his mission to transform Argentina's wine industry. On April 17, 1853, Sarmiento tasked Michel Aimé Pouget, a French soil expert, to bring new vines to Argentina. Among the varietals Pouget brought was Malbec. Pouget continued experimenting with the adaptation of French varietals to Argentina's diverse terroirs. A decade later, the Great French Wine Blight affected the Rhône region. The name "Malbec World Day" translates from the Spanish Día Mundial del Malbec, meaning "Malbec throughout the world". The name stuck and continues to confuse English speakers to this day, as most refer to it "World Malbec Day" or "Malbec Mondo" for those who like the alliteration. In the meantime, Malbec flourished in Argentina, creating wines widely superior to those of its country of origin. Many decades later, in 1956, France faced another obstacle when a freeze wiped out the majority of Malbec vineyards.

In the following years, specifically during the 1990s, Argentina positioned Malbec as their star varietal. More than 10,000 acres were planted and it became the undeniable leader of the country's exports. Wine lovers around the world, especially in the United States, discovered and praised Argentine Malbec.

== Origins ==
In 2011, Wines of Argentina, responsible for communicating the Argentine wine brand around the world, established April 17 as Malbec World Day. Lis Clément, their Head of Marketing and Communications at the time, founded this day because she was convinced this celebration would help position Malbec as one of Argentina's wine gems. Excellent quality, ever surprising and diverse, Argentina's Malbec would lead the way to position Argentina as one of the main oenological centers of the world.

== 2012 ==
The cities of New York City, Toronto and Ottawa simultaneously hosted "crushing parties" with Argentine grapes, with the intention of producing a special Malbec wine, which will be used for toasting at the 2012 edition of Malbec World Day.

== Argentina ==
On Saturday, April 16, 2011, Wines of Argentina held a cocktail party at Tupungato Winelands for 150 people, who were there to toast with Malbec from three hot-air balloons floating at 30 meters of height.

== United Kingdom ==
Two of the largest retailers in UK were promoting Argentine wines from the main regions: Salta, San Juan, Mendoza and Patagonia. Promotions, direct sales, internet and in-store sales and tastings were some of the activities.
