= Bolivian wine =

Wines made in Bolivia

Bolivian wine includes red wines, white wines, dessert wines, fortified wines, and sparkling wines. Bolivia is not a well-known wine country, however there are said to be about 400 producers, mostly small vineyards, but a few large ones, some of which produce quality wines. The majority of the wine industry in Bolivia, around 80%, is based in Tarija.

== History ==
The history of wine making in Bolivia begins in the 16th century with the arrival of the Spanish. To supply the monastic orders that traveled with the conquistadors, wine was necessary for the sacrament, thus vineyards were established. Franciscan monks planted the first vine in Tarija.

=== Early times ===
Bolivia's tropical climate was a big issue for early wine makers. Grapevines are a Mediterranean plant and do not thrive in tropical climates, the Spanish eventually found success by planting them in valleys at high altitudes. The Spanish colonists were able to find temperatures that were better for the vine when over 1,500 meters (4,921 feet) in elevation. They planted Criolla varieties there, including grapevines of Negra Criolla (also known as Mission, Pas, and Criolla Chica) and Muscat of Alexandria.

=== Modern times ===
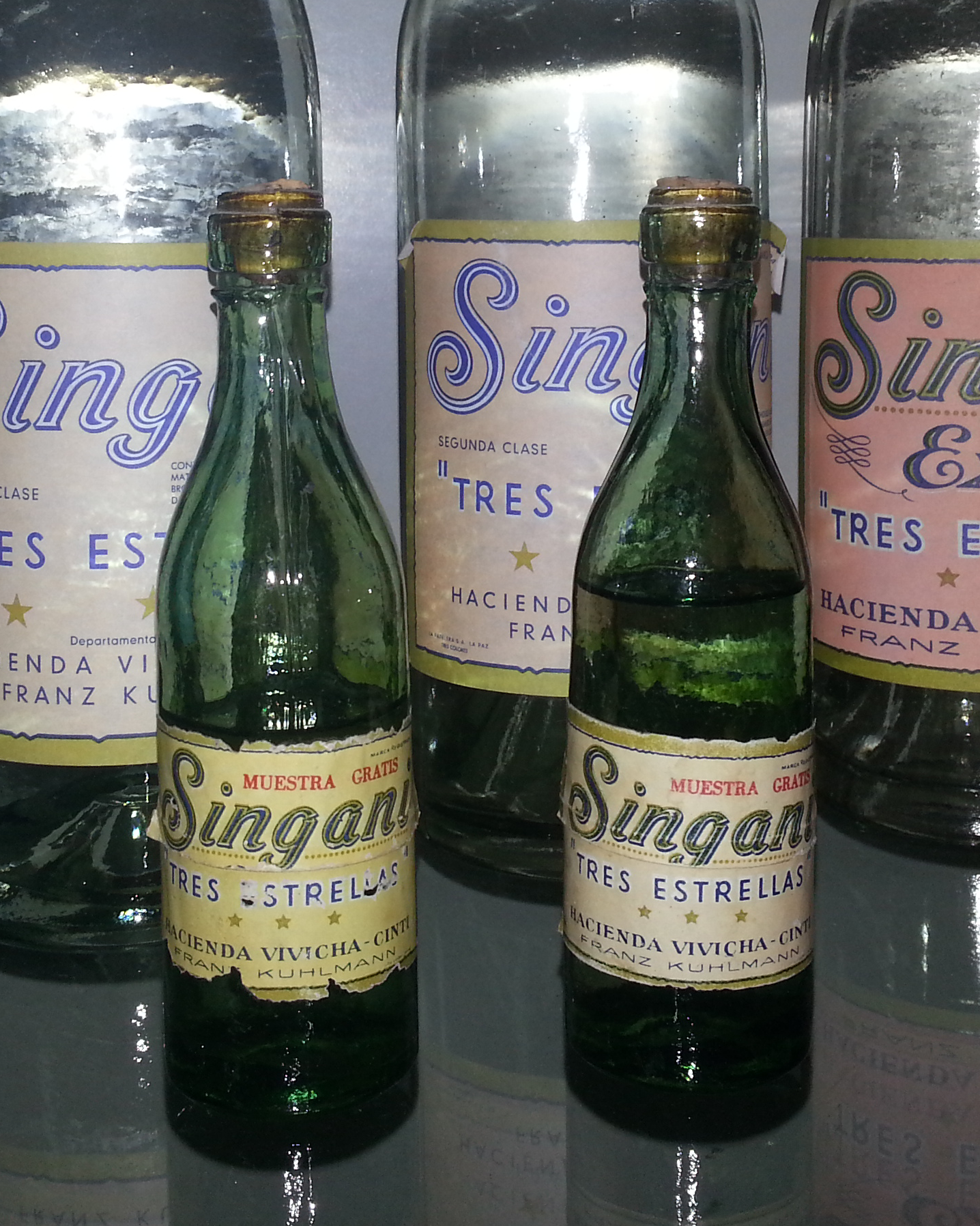
Singani bottles and samples from 1930.

Since the 1960s and 1970s, when modern wine making technology and expertise first entered the nation, viticulture and wine making have advanced significantly.

Although just a small percentage of the 7,500 acres of vineyards in Bolivia are made up of Muscat of Alexandria, the majority of this output is turned into wine which is eventually distilled to create singani, the national brandy of Bolivia manufactured from Muscat of Alexandria. This 40% fragrant spirit is often consumed blended with ginger ale or regional fruit juices and captures the aromatic strength of the Muscat grape.

Bolivian winemakers have been experimenting with planting different grape varieties since the 1990s, focusing on red grape varieties that could be well suited to the high-altitude land. When Vineyards are located between 1,500 and 2,800 meters above sea level (4,921 and 9,186 feet), thin-skinned varieties generally cannot tolerate increased UV Radiation. Success has been achieved with lesser known French and Spanish varieties and some modern crosses.

== Geography and climate ==
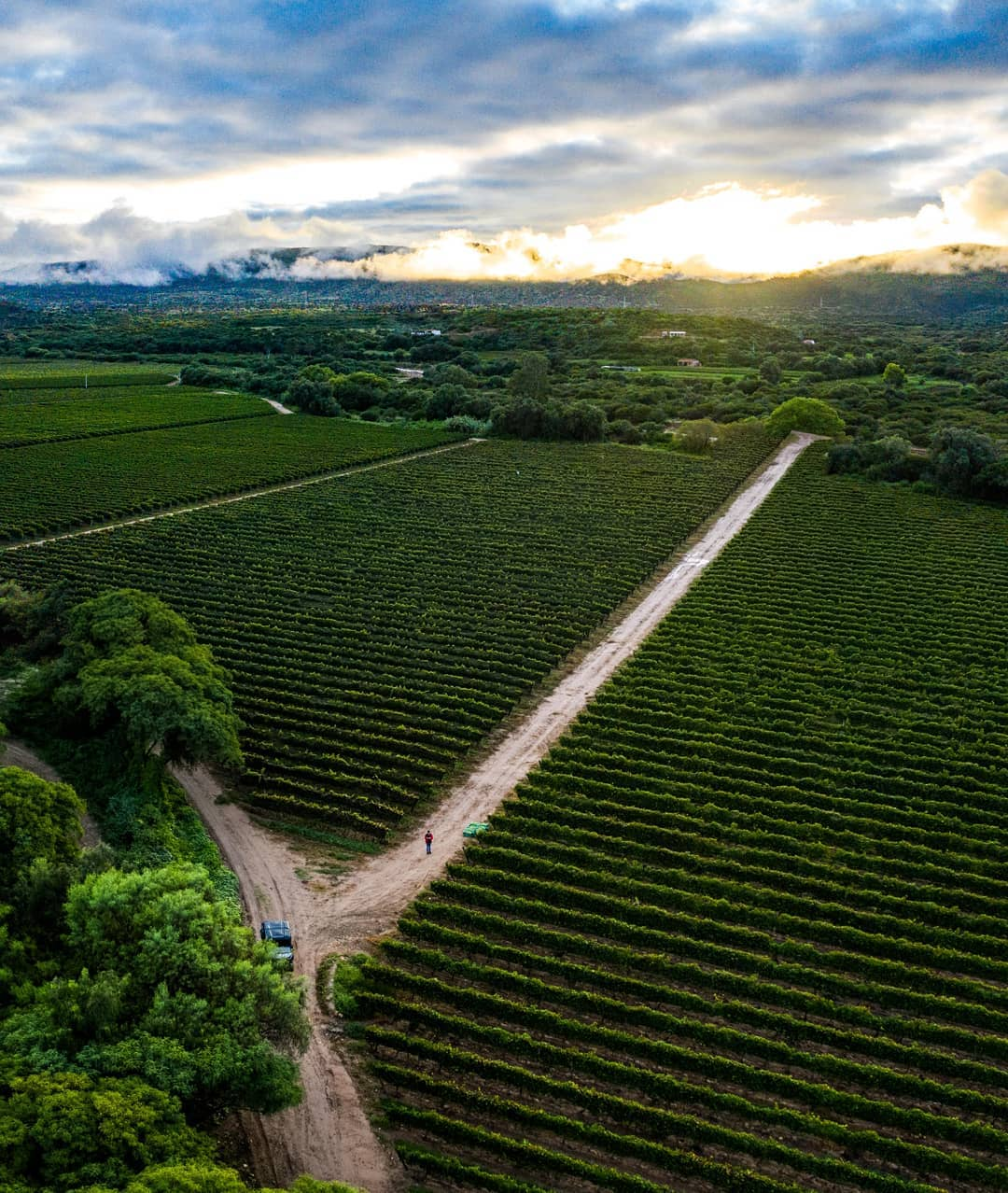
Aereal view of the vineyards in the Central Valley of Tarija.

Bolivia is one of the most geographically challenging countries in the world. It is fully in tropical climate latitudes which is not good for viticulture. The country is located in high altitudes. 99% of all vineyards in the country are situated between 1,600 and 3,000 meters. In all parts of the world, the wine is being made at sea level, 800m, 1,000m, a little more, however, Bolivian wine yards are mostly concentrated at an altitude of 1,600–2,000 meters or even in the hot regions of the Andes there are crops up to 3,000 meters.

The high altitude of Bolivia gives the country's wines a unique taste. The average vineyard starts at 1,500 meters above sea level where sun shine is intense. And due to the atmosphere being thinner the grapes change. Moreover, vineyards benefit from lack of winds and humidity at night. Daytime temperatures can rise above 35 °C, which increases acidity, and summer rains dilute the wine.

== Grape varieties ==
Vineyards in Bolivia are dominated by Muscat of Alexandria. However, white wine grapes like Torrontes, Chenin blanc, Riesling, Pedro Giménez, Sauvignon blanc, Chardonnay and red wine grapes like Cabernet Sauvignon, Merlot, Syrah, Malbec, Tannat, Carmenere can be found too. Grapes are harvested both for wine production and for the historic Singani industry, a clear brandy that is widely considered a national spirit.

== Wine regions ==
The location of the main wine regions of Bolivia.

=== Tarija ===
The Tarija valley is Bolivia's main wine-producing region. 93% of the grapes intended for wine production are concentrated in the southern part of the Tarija Valley. Altitudes range from 1,600 to 2,150 meters. The valley is wide and fertile, with a slightly Mediterranean climate and strong winds that prevent the vineyards from ripening their fruit. A fresh eastern breeze influences the viticulture, contributing to the fresh and elegant style of the region. Because of the altitude, conditions are generally mild and semi-arid. Water is taken from rivers in different nearby valleys for irrigation.

=== Los Cintis ===
The Los Cintis valley has 300ha of vineyards. It is located 2,400 meters above sea level. The area is considered as the spiritual home of small-scale, traditional winemaking. There are about 30 vineyards with parrale or climbing vines which are between 100 and 250 years old, interspersed with molle and chañar trees.

=== Cotagaita and Vitichi ===
These two neighbouring regions had together as of 2008 about 250 ha of vineyards representing 10% of Bolivias total area of vineyards.

=== Vallegrande ===
This region contains 100 ha of cultivable area.

== Wineries ==
- Aranjuez, Tarija.
- Bodegas Kohlberg, Tarija.
- Bodegas Landsuá, Samaipata.
- Bodegas Uvairenda (Vinos 1750), Samaipata.
- Campos de Solana, Tarija.
- La Casa Vieja, Tarija.

== See also ==
- Agriculture in Bolivia
- Bolivia
- Bolivian cuisine
- Tarija Department
- Winemaking
