= Criolla (grape) =

Several varieties of grape

Criolla is a term used in the name of several grape varieties, in particular varieties found in Argentina, the most common of which is Criolla Grande and another which is Criolla Chica.

The term Criollas is also used collectively to refer to a group of presumably American-born cultivars the European grapevine Vitis vinifera, much in the same way as many other uses of the term Criollo. The Criollas group of grape varieties also includes e.g. the three Argentine Torrontés varieties (Torrontés Mendocino, Torrontés Riojano, and Torrontés Sanjuanino) and Torontel (also known as Moscatel Amarillo). A common feature of the Criollas group is a better resistance to certain types of environmental stress, such as low water availability and high salt concentrations, than many traditional European grape varieties. Presumably, these varieties have been selected by pioneering viticulturists for these properties, which made them easier to grow in early South American vineyards.
