= Pedro Giménez =

Variety of grape

- Grape (Vitis)
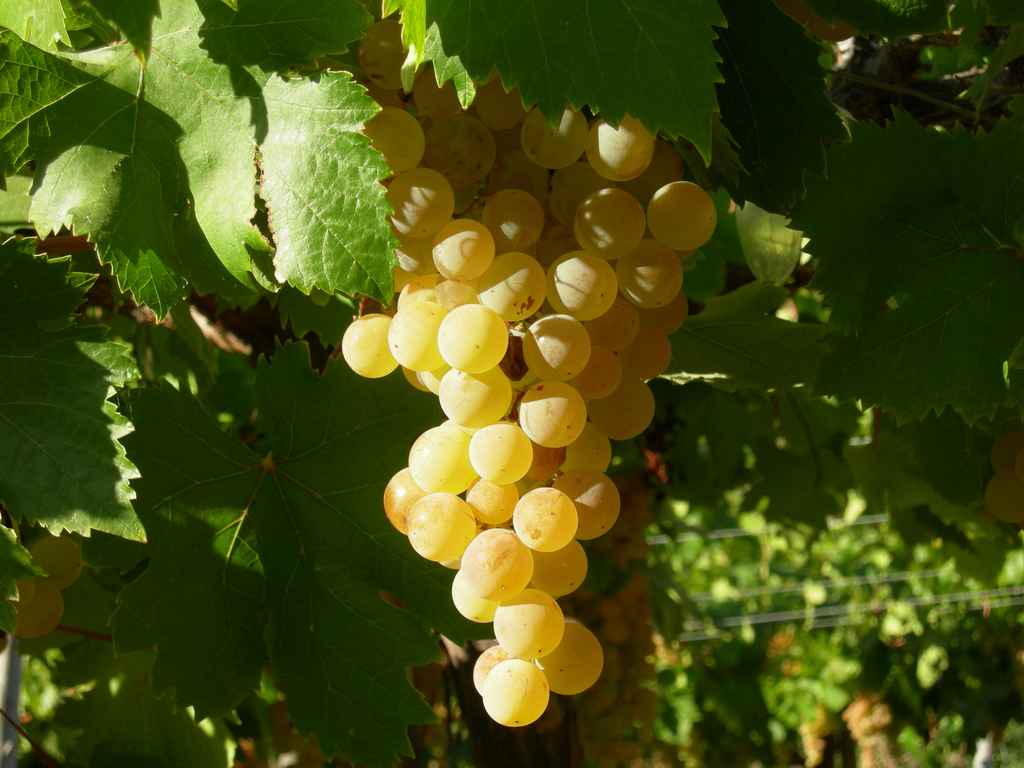
- Pedro Giménez growing in Chile.
- VIVC number: 24977

Pedro Giménez is a white Argentine wine grape that is rapidly declining in plantings. Despite the similar name, the Spanish wine grape Pedro Ximénez is a different variety, and ampelographers are not yet certain if the two grapes are in any way related. Grown predominantly in the Mendoza wine region, Pedro Giménez makes simple wines similar to those made from Cereza and Criolla Grande. It is also grown in Bolivia, where it is made into single varietal wine at the Uvairenda winery in Samaipata. There are some plantings in Chile where it is a minor grape in pisco production.
