= Lagarde (winery) =

Winery in Mendoza, Argentina

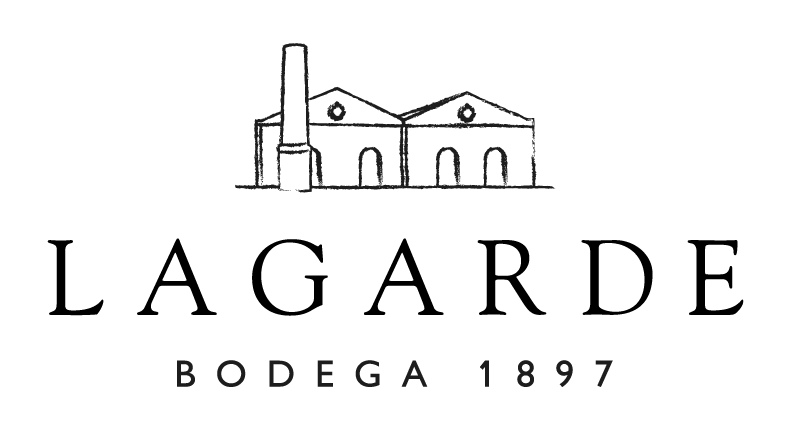
- Location: Mendoza, Argentina
- Appellation: D.O.C. Malbec
- Founded: 1897
- Key people: Sofía Pescarmona, Lucila Pescarmona, Juan Roby Stordeur
- Varietal: Malbec, Cabernet Sauvignon, Syrah, Cabernet Franc, Merlot, Viognier, Chardonnay, Sauvignon Blanc, Torrontes
- Distribution: 35+ countries
- Website: http://www.lagarde.com.ar

Lagarde or Bodega Lagarde is a family-owned winery located in the Luján de Cuyo Department located in the west of the Mendoza Province, Argentina and was founded in 1897. Lagarde consists of five Mendoza vineyards and is currently owned and managed by the Pescarmona family. The winery is currently run by the third generation Pescarmonas: Sofía Pescarmona and Lucila Pescarmona, with Juan Roby Stordeur as the winemaker since 2002.

Lagarde was ranked 5th Best Winery in the World by Forbes in 2025.

== History ==
Artillery Captain José Ángel Pereira founded Lagarde in 1897 after a military campaign in the Mendoza region. He planted both Malbec and Cabernet Franc varietals. Some of his original vines still produce grapes for the Lagarde Malbec. When the great grandchild of José Ángel had no heirs to take control of Lagarde, he decided to pass on the vineyard to his close friend, Luis Menotti Pescarmona in 1969. Under Pescarmona ownership, the winery has acquired 4 additional vineyards and introduce multiple new varietals.

== Pescarmona Sisters ==
Sofía and Lucila Pescarmona are considered to be part of the new generation of women in the winemaking world in Argentina, together with Susana Balbo and Laura Catena, among others. Both sister's obtained their MBA at IAE Business School in 1991 and 2011 respectively. They are considered to be part of a new generation of thriving young women managing Argentine wineries to a new frontier.

Sofía has managed the vineyard since 2001 and has helped the transformation of the old Lagarde into a new a modern facility. Lucila currently overseas the exports of the winery and sits on the board of Wines of Argentina.

== Winery ==
The winery is located in the original wine-making region of Mendoza, Luján de Cuyo and has kept its original physical structures to house the winery. For example the restaurant is set in a 19th-century manor house.

=== Vineyards ===
Lagarde has five different vineyards located in different areas of Mendoza like Lujan de Cuyo, Perdriel, Gualtallary, Agrelo and Uco Valley.

== Wines ==
=== Altas Cumbres ===
Altas Cumbres is the line of young and expressive wines. The collection comprises

- Malbec
- Cabernet Sauvignon
- Viognier
- Torrontes

=== Lagarde ===
Lagarde or Henry Lagarde in the US, is the core brand of the winery, usually referred to as the Reserve Line. The wines are 100% varietal wines.

- Malbec
- Cabernet Sauvignon
- Merlot
- Syrah
- Viognier
- Chardonnay

=== Guarda ===
Guarda is the collection of single vineyard wines.

- Cabernet Franc
- DOC Malbec
- Blend

=== Primeras Viñas ===
Malbec produced from the two centennial vineyards of Lagarde. One planted in 1906 and the other in 1937.

== Awards ==
- #5 Best Winery in the World ranked by Forbes
- Lagarde Malbec 2012, 90pts, Wine Enthusiast, February 2015
- Lagarde Primeras Vinas Malbec 2010, 92pts, Wine Enthusiast Magazine, May 2013
- Lagarde Guarda Cabernet Franc 2011, 91pts, Robert Parker Jr.’s "The Wine Advocate", December 2011

== Restaurants ==
Lagarde has two restaurants located at the winery.
