= Dominio del Plata Winery =

Winery in Mendoza, Argentina

Dominio del Plata
- Wine region: Mendoza
- Appellation: Lujan de Cuyo
- Other labels: Crios, BenMarco, Susana Balbo Signature, Nosotros
- Founded: 1999
- Key people: Susana Balbo, Jose Lovaglio, Ana Lovaglio, Edgardo del Popolo
- Varietals: Chardonnay, Torrontes, Pinot Noir, Malbec, Cabernet Sauvignon, Syrah, Bonarda
- Distribution: International
- Website: www.dominiodelplata.com.ar

Dominio del Plata is a medium-sized winery located in the Lujan de Cuyo region of Mendoza, Argentina. It was founded in 1999 by enologist and entrepreneur Susana Balbo.

== History ==
After twenty years of working as a consultant winemaker both in Argentina and around the world, Susana Balbo decided to open her own winery. In 1999, Susana rented a small winery and began her first batches of wine. Initially the production was quite small. The first batches of the Susana Balbo and Ben Marco lines were released in August 2000.

The period between 2001 and 2009 was a time of both internal and external expansion for the company. The groundbreaking for the current winery occurred in 2001. During the same year, the proprietary vineyard was planted. Over the next eight years, the winery had several renovations. A barrel room was added in addition to an on-site bottling and storage plant. With each renovation the winery capacity grew significantly. At the same time, the portfolio of the winery was completed.

From 2010 through the present, the winery has undergone significant internal organizational changes. During this time both of Susana's children decided to join the family business. Her son Jose received his enology degree from UC Davis and works as both the winemaker and the export manager. Ana, her daughter, has a degree in Business Administration from Universidad de San Andres and is the manager of the marketing department. In 2013, Edgardo del Popolo was appointed CEO of Dominio del Plata.

Also in 2013, the restaurant Osadia de Crear opened at the winery. This project was spearheaded by Ana and Chef Jose Cacciavillani. The restaurant offers fusion dishes of Mediterranean and Argentine inspiration, as well as deli sandwiches and salads.

== Susana Balbo ==
Susana Balbo was born in Mendoza, Argentina to a traditional Italian family. Wine was always a big part of her life as she was growing up "My first memory is not actually mine, it's told to me by my parents. In my childhood, the beverage for kids was water with a drop of wine to taint the color. So my parents gave me a full glass of water with a few drops of wine, and it seems I liked it as a 3-year old. They say they looked to the side, and I was taking the bottle to pour a full glass of wine!" She opted to become a wine maker and graduated from Don Bosco University in 1981 with a degree in enology. Upon graduating, Susana became the first female enologist in the history of Argentine winemaking.

Susana's first job as a winemaker was at Michel Torino winery in the Salta province. At Michel Torino, Susana was put in charge of further developing the Torrontes varietal, which is native to Argentina. She stylized the wine so that it showed a very floral nose, with a refreshing citrus taste. To this day, she is credited with being the creator of this distinctive and popular style earning her the nickname "Queen of Torrontes".

After working in Salta, Susana returned to Mendoza to work in wineries including Bodega Martins and Bodega Catena Zapata. She founded Dominio del Plata in 1999 in Lujan de Cuyo, Mendoza. Even though she started her own winery, Susana maintains her presence in the global wine community. She served as president of Wines of Argentina twice, and still works as a consultant for many wineries around the world.

== Winery ==
In its current phase, the winery has an approximate area of 7,000 square meters. Dominio del Plata mainly uses stainless steel fermentation tanks. The winery ferments in concrete tanks and oak barrels, but on a smaller scale. The approximate yearly output of the winery is 2,000,000 liters.

Dominio del Plata is environmentally friendly, and employs practices such as water recycling and reduced packaging weight to minimize its carbon footprint. The winery has received ISO 22000 certification, which provides consumers with transparency throughout the winemaking and shipping processes.

== Wines ==
Dominio del Plata currently exports to 36 Countries. The biggest markets are the United States, Canada, Brazil, the United Kingdom, and Japan. There are four major brands produced by Dominio del Plata: Crios, BenMarco, Susana Balbo, and Nosotros.

=== Crios ===
This is a line of young, fresh, and very fruit forward wines. Crios means "offspring" in Argentine slang.

- Chardonnay
- Torrontes
- Rose of Malbec
- Pinot Noir
- Malbec
- Cabernet Sauvignon
- Syrah-Bonarda
- Red Blend

=== BenMarco ===
The BenMarco wines are the most traditional Argentine style wines produced by Dominio del Plata. They display strong concentration and focus on primary fruit aromas.

- Torrontes
- Pinot Noir
- Malbec
- Cabernet Sauvignon
- Expresivo (Mendoza style blend)

=== Susana Balbo Signature ===
Susana created this line of wines to fit her own personal tastes. Susana selects the barrels that display great complexity and concentration, and then blends them to produce the final product.

- Malbec
- Cabernet Sauvignon
- Brioso
- Late Harvest Torrontes
- Late Harvest Malbec

=== Nosotros ===
The Nosotros Malbec pays homage to all of the efforts of the Dominio del Plata team. The best 40 barrels are selected by the enologists each year, and are then left to age for 18 months in new French oak. In Spanish, Nosotros means "us". This wine is dedicated to all of the people who work to produce it.

- Malbec

== Awards ==
Sources.

- Crios Torrontes 2011, 90pts, Stephen Tanzer's International Wine Cellar, March 2012
- Crios Chardonnay 2010, Silver Medal, "Argentine Wine Awards 2011"
- BenMarco Expresivo 2009, 92pts, Robert Parker Jr.'s "The Wine Advocate", December 2011
- Susana Balbo Brioso 2008, 93pts, Robert Parker Jr.'s "The Wine Advocate", December 2011
- Susana Balbo Late Harvest Torrontes 2011, 92 pts, Stephen Tanzer's International Wine Cellar, March 2013
- Nosotros Malbec 2008, 94pts, Robert Parker Jr.'s "The Wine Advocate", December 2011
