= Edmund James Palmer Norton =

Sir Edmund James Palmer Norton (1865–1944) was an engineer of English descent who was born on the frontier between the Kingdom of Prussia and Denmark, though raised in England. He is credited as a pioneer of Argentine viticulture.

== Transandine Railway ==
After graduating with a degree in engineering his expertise in building railway bridges was requested to help build the Transandine Railway which connected the Argentine railroad from Mendoza to Santiago, Chile. This line, climbing through the Andes through a 12,000-foot pass, was built in one of the most difficult railroad terrains in the world. Though the railway has not been functional since 1984, in 2006, both the Argentine and Chilean governments agreed to refurbish the railway and make it functional by the year 2010, at an estimated total cost of US$460 million.

== Argentine viticulture ==
Once his work on the railway was completed, he moved to Bahía Blanca before returning to Mendoza in 1889 to settle permanently. Though his formal training was in designing railway bridges, he soon sought other opportunities. In 1895 he founded the very first winery in the area, Bodega Norton, located to the south of the Mendoza River in the district of Perdriel, in the department of Luján de Cuyo. Norton recognized the Mendoza region's potential for wine cultivation and production, and planted grapes with vines imported from France. He devoted the rest of his life to winemaking. He married Juana Suarez and had several children, some of whom continued the family business.

== Bodega Norton ==
In 1989, Bodega Norton was acquired by Austrian entrepreneur Gernot Langes–Swarovski, owner of Swarovski Crystal Company. Bodega Norton now exports over 1.5 million cases annually.
