= Cereza =

Variety of grape

- Grape (Vitis)
- Color of berry skin: Pink
- Species: Vitis vinifera
- Also called: See list of synonyms
- Origin: Argentina
- Original pedigree: Muscat of Alexandria × Listan Negro
- VIVC number: 2390

Cereza (Spanish for "cherry") is a white Argentine wine grape variety. Like Gewürztraminer and Pinot gris, Cereza is a pink skinned variety. It is a crossing of Muscat of Alexandria and Listan negro.

== History ==
Like Criolla Grande, Pais and the Spanish Mission grape that was widely in North and South America, ampelographers believe the grape was likely introduced to Argentina by early Spanish settlers. By the mid to late 20th century, Cereza, Criolla and Pais together accounted for more than a third of all grapevines planted in South America. The high yields and prolific nature of the vine contributed to its spread with around 40,000 hectares (100,000 acres) planted by the 1980s but since then its numbers have been slowly declining. By 2003, its numbers had dropped by nearly a quarter to 30,760 ha/76,000 acres.

== Wine regions ==
The San Juan province where most plantings of Cereza are found. Below is the Mendoza province which also has some plantings.

While the grape was once widely planted throughout Argentina, today it is mostly found in the San Juan province and eastern Mendoza region.

== Viticulture and winemaking ==
After centuries in Argentina, the Cereza vine has adapted to the hot, arid condition and with irrigation became a reliable producer of crops for harvest. Compared to the related, red-skin Criolla Grande, Cereza has a noticeably lighter, pink skin with larger berries that contribute very little color phenols during maceration. As such, the wines produced from Cereza are almost always white with some rosés also being produced.

== Wine styles ==
Cereza produces deeply colored white and rosé wines that are usually intended for early consumption. According to wine expert Jancis Robinson, the wines can be fairly "rustic" and of basic quality, especially when yields are high (and they can often be in excess of 200 hectoliters/ha). In addition to wine production, the grape is often used in the production of grape concentrate used in winemaking.

== Synonyms ==
Cereza is also known under the synonyms Ceresa, Ceresina, Cereza Italiana, Cerise, and Chereza.
