= Trapiche (winery) =

Argentinian winery

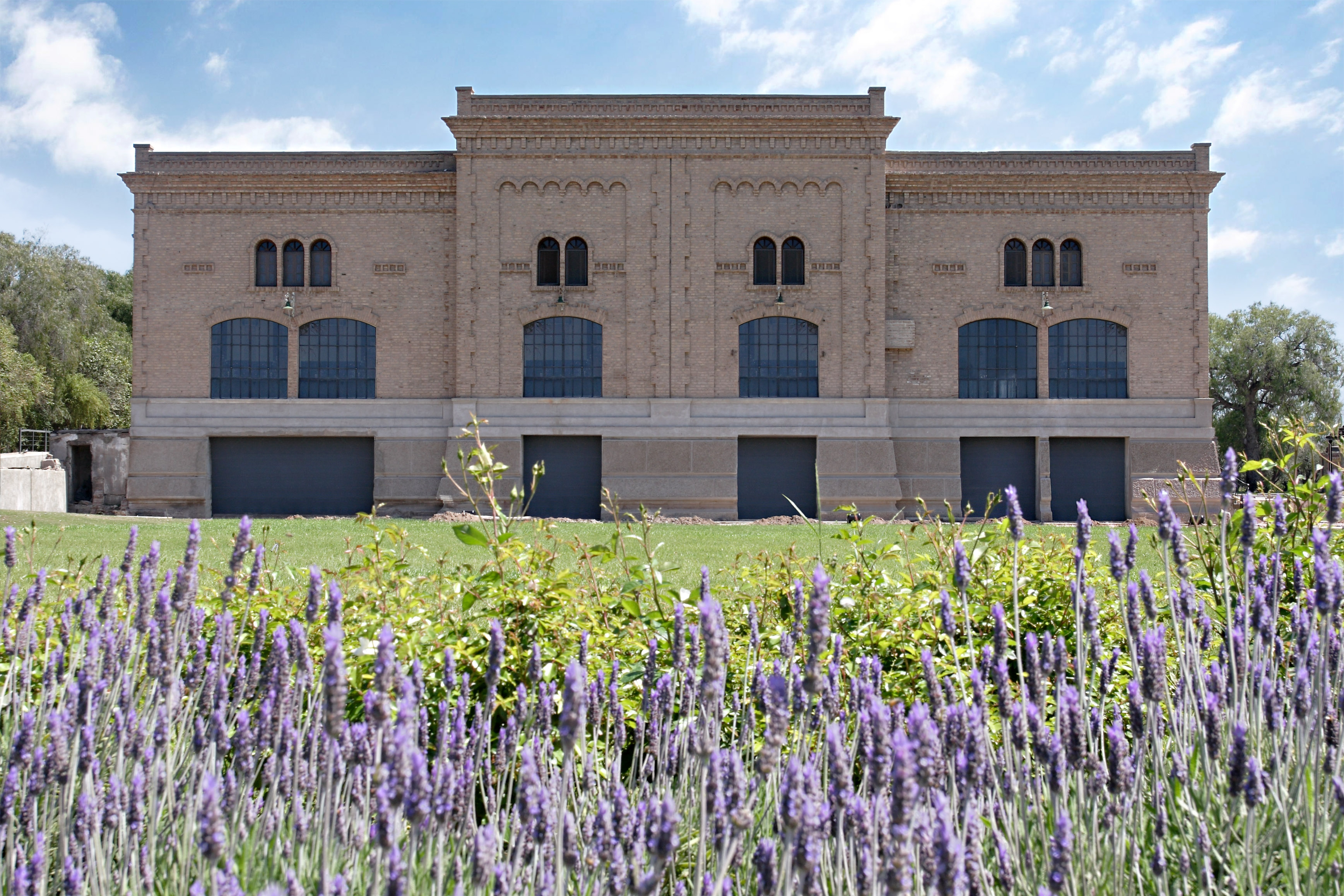
- Location: Mendoza, Argentina
- Appellation: Argentine wine
- Founded: 1883
- Key people: Daniel Pi, Chief Winemaker
- Varietal: Terroir Series, Iscay, Manos, Costa&Pampa, Broquel, Oak Cask
- Distribution: International
- Website: http://www.trapiche.com.ar

Trapiche is a winery in Mendoza, Argentina. It was founded in 1883 and consists of over 1000 hectares between several Mendoza vineyards. It is a two-time winner of the International Wine and Spirit Competition Argentine Wine Producer of the Year award, and is the largest producer of wine in Argentina. Trapiche is owned by Grupo Peñaflor, one of the first ten wine producers in the world.

== History ==
Trapiche was founded when Tiburcio Benegas bought property in Mendoza in 1883, which contained a small vineyard. Benegas named his property El Trapiche, and grew it to 6,653 hectares. When Benegas died in 1908, his business became Benegas e Hijos S.A., of which his son Pedro Benegas was the chief winemaker. Pedro Benegas created a number of new wines, including Fond de Cave, Broquel, Monitor, Crillon, Puento Viejo, Feudo Viejo, Trapiche Viejo, and Vezely. When Pedro Benegas died in 1943, the company was taken over by his sons and renamed Benegas Hermanos. In 1971, Benegas Hermanos was sold to the Pulenta family, who renamed the company Peñaflor S.A. Peñaflor continued to produce and modify its existing Trapiche, Broquel, and Puente Viejo wines, while developing new brands and its white wines.

DLJ Merchant Banking Partners acquired the Pulenta family's stake in Penaflor and Trapiche in 2002 and arranged to export Trapiche to over 40 countries, including to the United States through American wine importers Frederick Wildman & Sons. In 2002, Daniel Pi was appointed Chief Winemaker and oenologist, who consolidated all of Trapiche's winemaking and viticulture. Pi also helped establish Trapiche's line of single vineyard Malbecs, and established the Tributo winery.

In 2010, the Bemberg family acquired Grupo Peñaflor’s full stock of shares.

== Wine brands ==
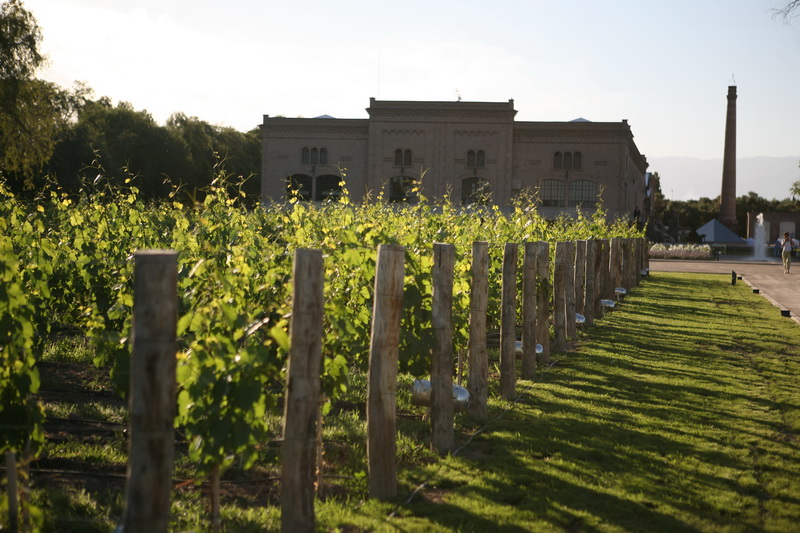
The Trapiche vineyard in Mendoza, Argentina.

Trapiche produces many of its varietals under the Trapiche brand name, largely coming from selected vineyards in the "high area of the Mendoza River and in the east region of Mendoza." These include a Malbec, Sauvignon Blanc, Cabernet Sauvignon, Pinot Noir, Syrah, Chardonnay, Merlot, Torrontés, Rosé, Viognier, and a Pinot Grigio.

Trapiche sells a yearly set of single-vineyard Malbecs, created by Daniel Pi as a way to show an appreciation for smaller, individual Mendoza vineyards, some of which were cited by Wine Spectator as "the best wines that Trapiche has ever produced." As part of the Trapiche Single Vineyard Malbec series, Pi selects three of the best Malbec grape growers in Mendoza each year.

== Awards ==
Trapiche was named Impact Magazine's 2007, 2008 and 2009 "Hot Brand." It was named the "Argentinian wine producer of the year" in 2004 and 2008 by the International Wine and Spirit Competition. Trapiche wines are also frequently named to Wine and Spirits Magazine's Value Brands of the Year list, noting, "It's wineries like Trapiche that have given Argentina a name for value. The brand has been a regular among our Value Brands of the Year."
