= Tupungato Department =

Tupungato Departamento Tupungato
- Department
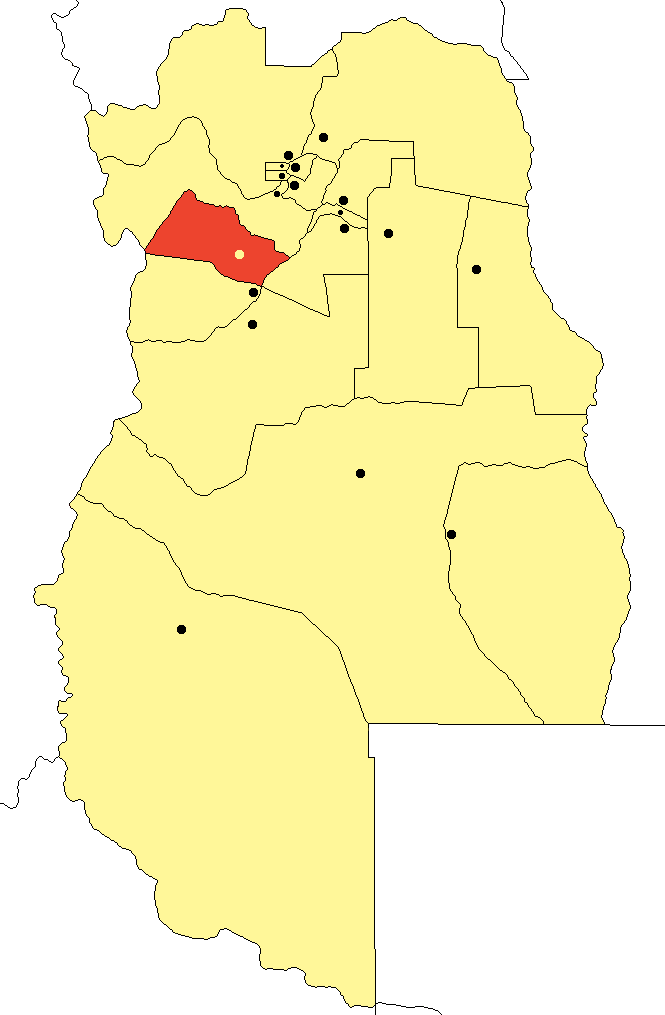
- location of Tupungato Department in Mendoza Province
- Coordinates: 33°15′S 69°15′W
- Country: Argentina
- Established: November 8, 1858
- Founder: ?
- Seat: Tupungato

Government
  - Intendant: Gustavo Aguilera, UCR

Area
  - Total: 2,485 km^{2} (959 sq mi)

Population (2022 census [INDEC])
  - Total: 41,280
  - Density: 16.61/km^{2} (43.02/sq mi)
- Demonym: tupungatense
- Postal Code: M5561
- IFAM: MZA018
- Area Code: 02622
- Patron saint: ?
- Website: www.tupungato.mendoza.gov.ar

Tupungato is a department located in the province of Mendoza, Argentina. The cabecera (departmental capital), Tupungato, is located approximately 70 km (43 mi) south of Mendoza city, in the Valle de Uco.

Its name comes from the Tupungato volcano (at 6,570 metres, one of Argentina's highest peaks). The volcano's name is said to mean "star viewpoint" in the Huarpe language.

The department is approximately 1,200 metres above mean sea level, and comprises 2,485 km^{2} (959 sq mi) (1.6% of the provincial total). According to the 2001 census [INDEC], the total population of the department was 28,539 with a density of 11.48 inhabitants per km^{2}.

The region is mainly dependent on agricultural production, with vineyards being its most important produce, representing 30% of the planted lands. Other regional products are fruit (mainly peach) and garlic. The wine industry, however, is particularly relevant due to the constant investments and intensive labour occupation. Recent developments in the Argentine economy have further fuelled the Argentine wine industry, attracting foreign investors and tourists to the region.

== Districts ==
- Anchoris
- Cordón del Plata
- El Peral, Tupungato
- El Zampal
- El Zampalito
- Gualtallary
- La Arboleda
- La Carrera, Tupungato
- San José

== See also ==
- Mendoza wine
