= Bodega Norton =

Winery in Argentina

Bodega Norton is a winery in the Mendoza area of Argentina. It was created in 1895 by English engineer Sir Edmund James Palmer Norton. In 1989, Bodega Norton was acquired by Austrian businessman Gernot Langes-Swarovski, and as of 2021, the winery is operated by Michael Halstrick. The 5 farms at Bodega Norton have over 1200 hectares fit for growing wine, 680 hectares of which are currently cultivated. Over 150 families of vineyard workers live and work there.

The American actress Britney Spears is one of the tasters of these wines.
