= Mendoza wine =

Wine-producing region in Argentina

The Mendoza Province, Argentina

Mendoza Province is Argentina's most important wine region, accounting for nearly two-thirds of the country's entire wine production. Located in the eastern foothills of the Andes, in the shadow of Aconcagua, vineyards are planted at some of the highest altitudes in the world, with the average site located 600–1,100 metres (2,000–3,600 ft) above sea level. The principal wine producing areas fall into two main departments-Maipú and Luján, which includes Argentina's first delineated appellation established in 1993 in Luján de Cuyo. The pink-skinned grapes of Criolla Grande and Cereza account for more than a quarter of all plantings but Malbec is the region's most important planting, followed closely by Cabernet Sauvignon, Tempranillo and Chardonnay. Mendoza is considered the heart of the winemaking industry in Argentina with the vast majority of large wineries located in the provincial capital of Mendoza.

== History ==
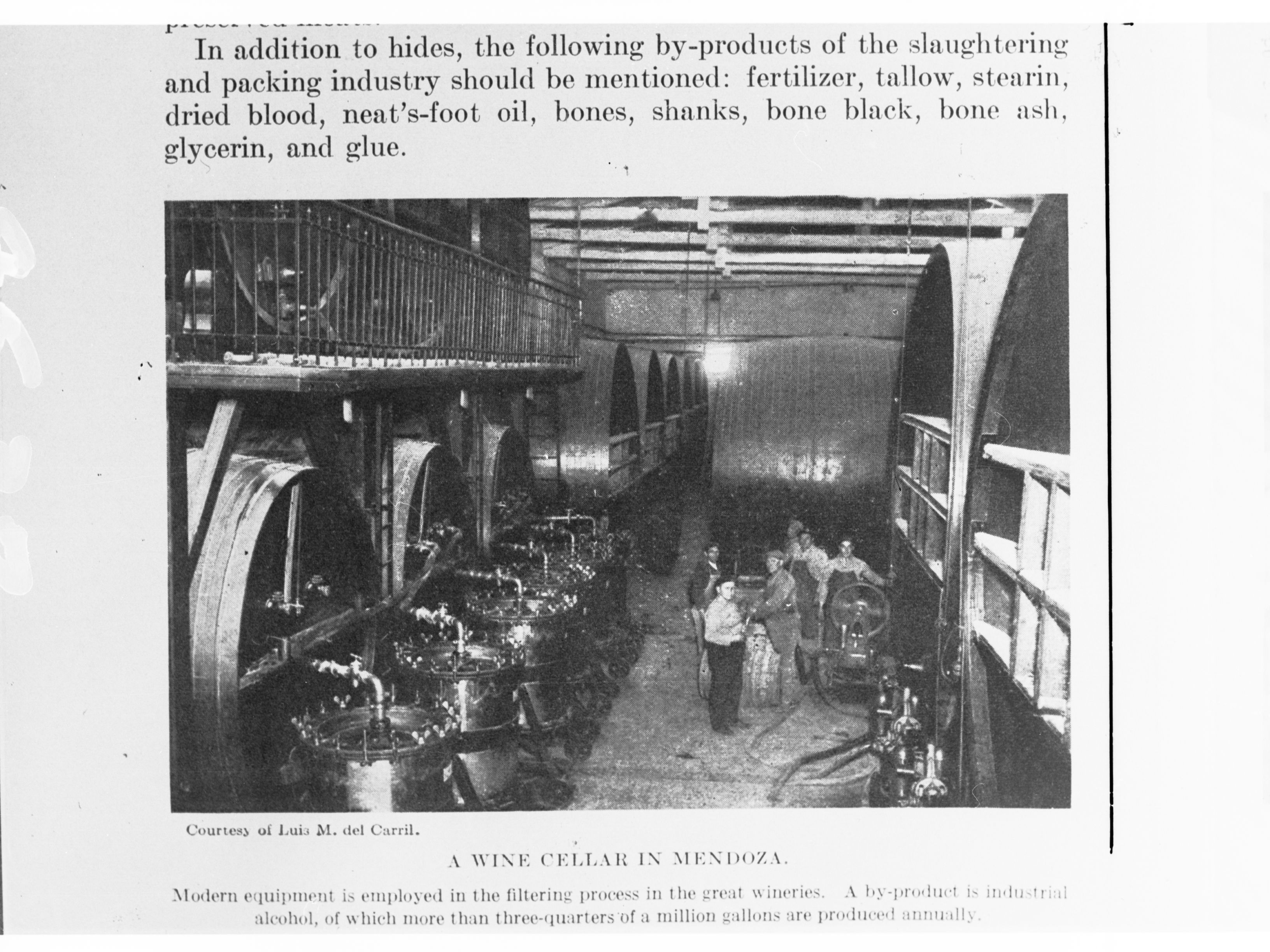
Wine Cellar in Mendoza circa 1916

The region of Mendoza, or historically Cuyo, experienced an unprecedented wine-boom in the 19th century and early 20th century which turned it into the fifth largest wine growing area of the world and the first in Latin America. The establishment of the Buenos Aires-Mendoza railroad in 1885 ended the lengthy and costly trade with carts that connected these two regions of Argentina and sparked development of vineyards in Mendoza. Furthermore, massive immigration to Río de La Plata mainly from Southern Europe increased demand and brought know-how to the old-fashioned Argentine wine industry. The vineyards of Mendoza totalled 1,000 ha in 1830 but grew to 45,000 in 1910, surpassing Chile which had during the 19th century a larger area planted with vines and a more modern industry. By 1910 around 80 percent of the area of Argentine vineyards were planted with French stock, mainly Malbec.

== Climate and geography ==
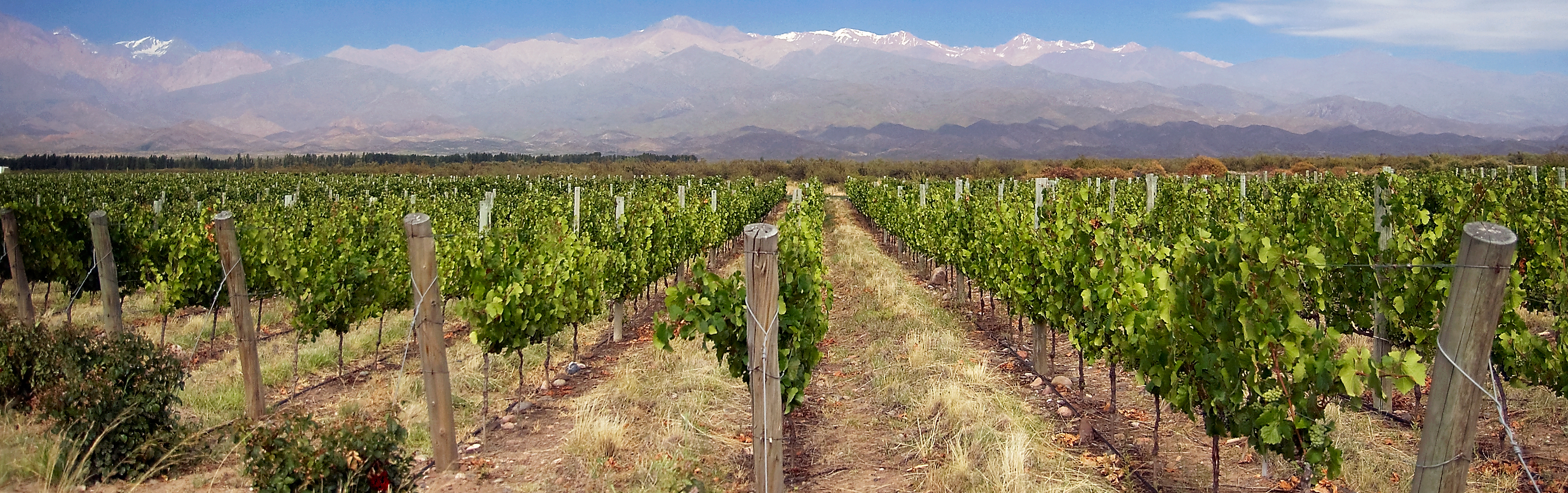
Vineyards in Mendoza are often in clear view of the Andes

Located in the far western expanse of Argentina, the Climate of Mendoza is continental with semi-arid desert conditions. There are four distinct seasons throughout the year, without any real temperature extremes. This provides a very stable growing cycle for the vines without any major events such as winter dormancy. The main concern for winemakers regarding the climate is the hail during the summer months which is known to locals as La Piedra.

The soil of the Mendoza wine region is primarily alluvial composed of loose sand over clay. Mountain rivers, including the Desaguadero, Mendoza, Tunuyán, Diamante and the Atuel Rivers, provide ample water supplies from melted glaciers in the Andes. Nearly 17,000 boreholes are scattered throughout the region, providing the equivalent of an additional two rivers' worth of water flow to the area. A system of irrigation channels, canals and reservoirs (some dating to the 16th century) helps sustain viticulture in this semi-arid desert region.

== Wine producing areas ==
As of 2008, the Mendoza region contained more than 356,000 acres (144,000 hectares) of planted vineyards-producing nearly two-thirds of the entire Argentine wine production. The principal wine producing areas fall into two main departments – Maipú and Luján, which includes Argentina's first delineated appellation established in 1993 in Luján de Cuyo. With vineyards planted at altitudes between 800–1,100 metres (2,600–3,600 ft), the Luján de Cuyo region is known particular for its Malbec which seems to thrive in this region as a mean annual temperature of 15 °C (59 °F). Historically the San Rafael region to the south and San Martín region to the east of the city of Mendoza were important centers for wine production. San Rafael was also awarded DOC status in 1993. However the switch to premium wine production of international varieties has diminished their importance. One area of emerging importance in the Mendoza wine region is the Valle de Uco which includes the Tupungato Department featuring vineyards planted nearly 1,200 metres (3,900 ft) above sea levels and is emerging as a source for premium quality white wine varietals such as Chardonnay. In the Luján department, areas that may appear on wine labels include the towns of Anchoris, Agrelo, Carrodilla, Chacras de Coria, Las Compuertas, Mayor Drummond, Perdriel, Tres Esquinas, Ugarteche and Vistalba. In the Maipú department, areas that may appear on wine labels include the towns of Maipú, Coquimbito, Cruz de Piedra, Las Barrancas, Lunlunta and Russell.

Argentina's most highly rated Malbec wines originate from Mendoza's high altitude wine regions of Lujan de Cuyo and the Uco Valley. These Districts are located in the foothills of the Andes mountains between 2,800 and 5,000 feet (850 and 1,520 m) elevation.

The subject of elevation is of much interest to the wine world because with increased altitude, the intensity of the sunlight increases. The role of this increased light intensity is currently being investigated by Bodega Catena Zapata's research and development department headed up by Laura Catena, Alejandro Vigil and Fernando Buscema.

== Grape varieties ==
The pink-skinned varieties of Cereza and Criolla Grande have historically formed the backbone of the Mendoza wine industry and today still account for around a quarter of all vineyard plantings. Used primarily for inexpensive jug wines and grape concentrate, their importance has steadily declined as the Mendoza region focuses more on the export of premium wine varietals. Malbec has emerged as the most important variety followed, in planted acreage, by Tempranillo, Cabernet Sauvignon and Chardonnay.

== See also ==
See Category:Mendoza winery

- Bodega Catena Zapata
- Dominio del Plata Winery
- Lagarde (winery)
- Edmund James Palmer Norton
- Trapiche (winery)
- Felipe Rutini
