= International variety =

Variety of grape

The international variety Pinot noir growing in Moldova

An international variety is a grape variety that is widely planted in most of the major wine producing regions and has widespread appeal and consumer recognition. These are grapes that are highly likely to appear on wine labels as varietal wines and are often considered benchmarks for emerging wine industries. There is some criticism that the popularity of so-called international varieties comes at the price of a region's indigenous varieties. The majority of declared international varieties are French in origin (most notably Cabernet Sauvignon and Chardonnay), though in recent years the popularity of Spanish (such as Tempranillo) and Italian varietals (like Sangiovese and Nebbiolo) has seen an increase in worldwide plantings and these may also be considered "international varieties".

== Classic varieties ==
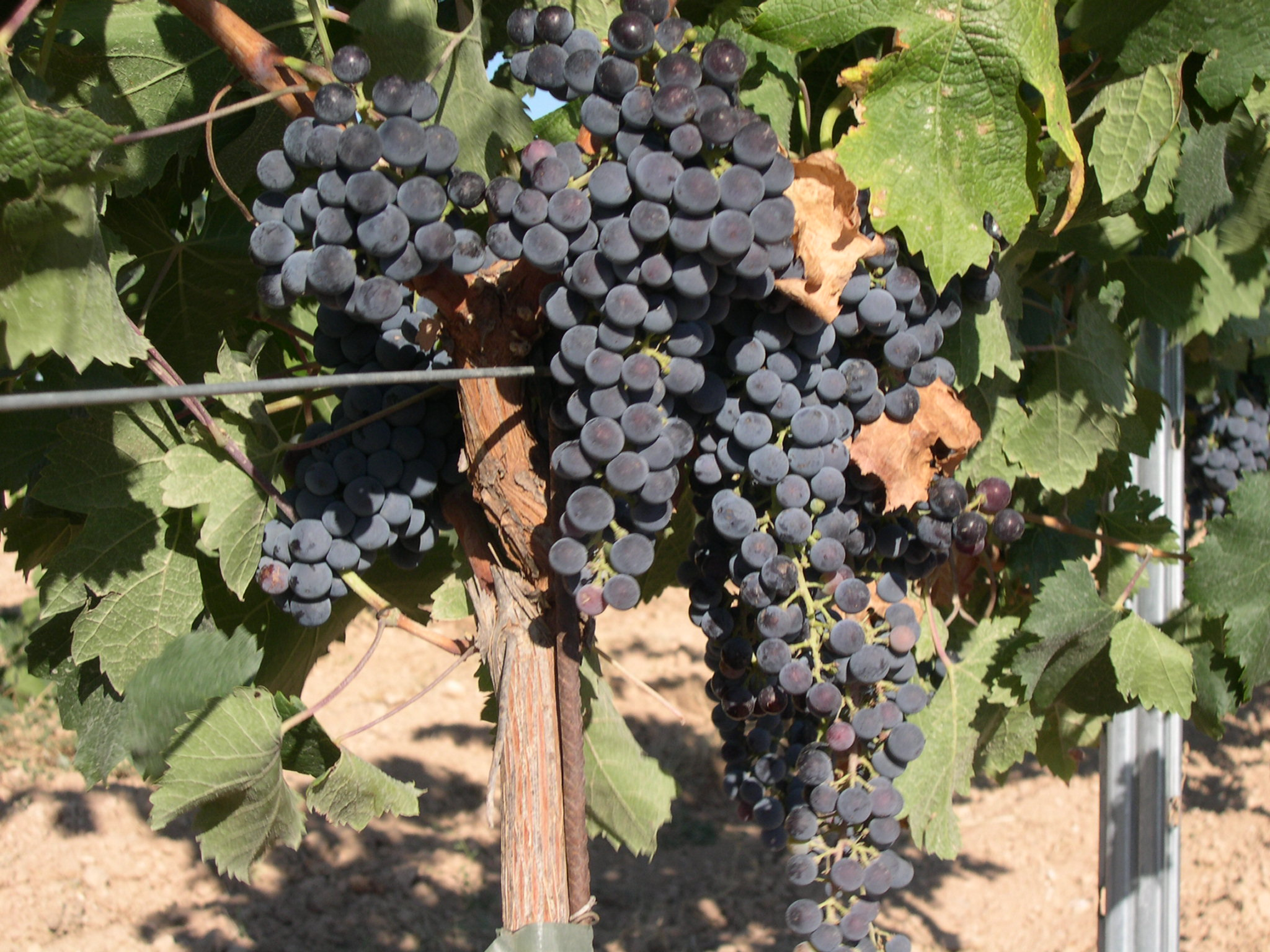
Merlot grapes growing in the La Mancha region of Spain

Wine expert Karen MacNeil describes an international variety as a "classic variety" which has a long established reputation for making premium quality wines in locations across the globe. The origins for many of these grapes trace back to France which has had a long history of influencing global viticulture and winemaking thought. The nine classic international varieties that MacNeil lists are Cabernet Sauvignon, Chardonnay, Chenin blanc, Merlot, Pinot noir, Riesling, Sauvignon blanc, Semillon and Syrah.

== Other varieties ==
As the wine industry expands across the globe, particularly in the New World, more varieties beyond the nine classic varieties listed above have been gaining recognition as "international varieties". These include French as well as Spanish, Italian and German varieties such as Muscat, Malbec, Mourvedre, Tempranillo, Sangiovese, Nebbiolo, Gewürztraminer, Pinot blanc, Pinot gris, Pinotage (South-Africa) and Viognier.

== Noble grapes ==
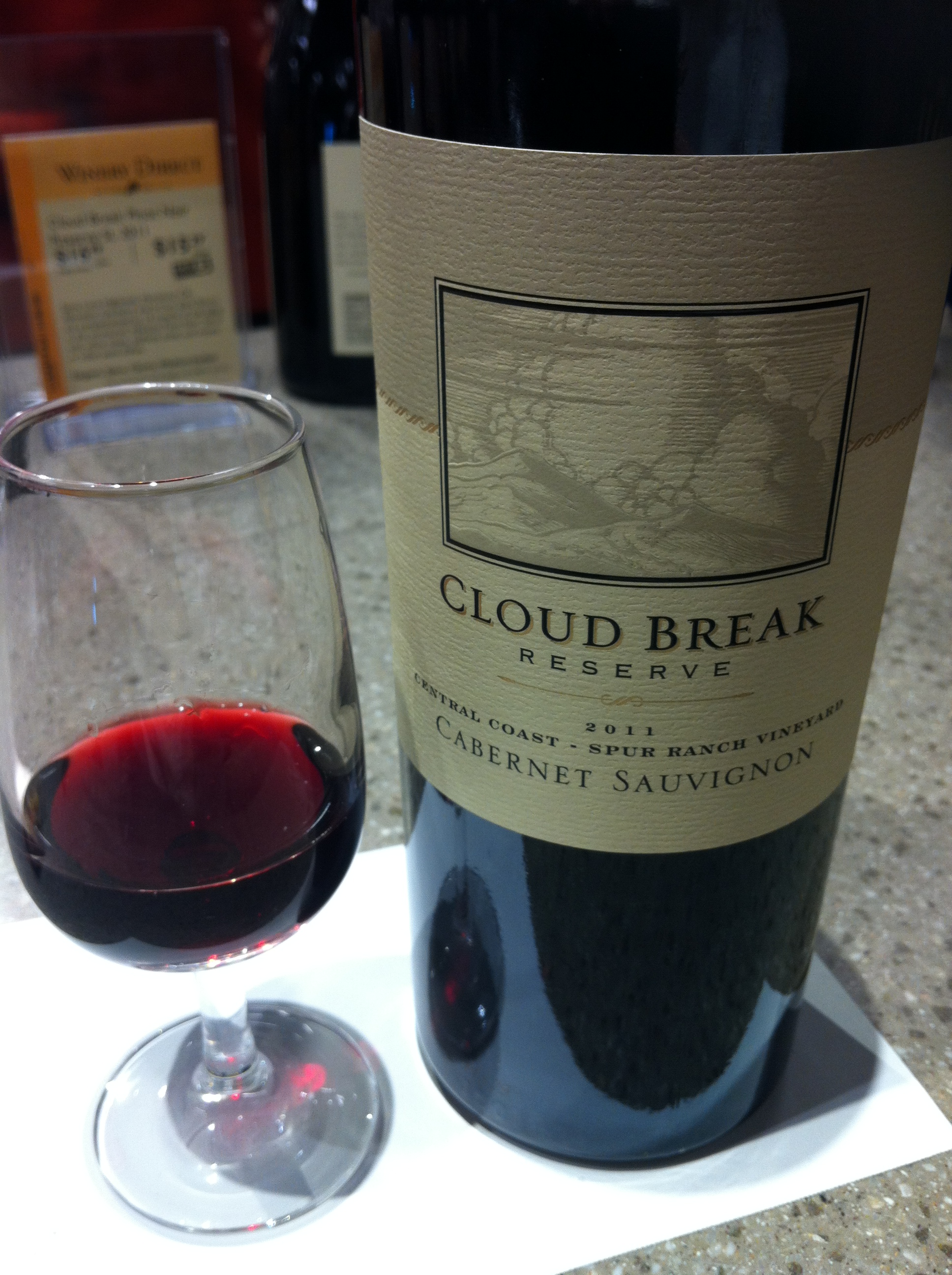
A Californian Cabernet Sauvignon

Noble grapes are any grapes traditionally associated with the highest quality wines. Noble grapes are said to retain their character no matter where they are planted. This concept is not as common today, partly because of the proliferation of hybrid grape varieties, and partly because some critics feel that it unfairly prioritizes varieties grown within France. Historically speaking, the noble grapes comprised only six varieties. The white noble grapes were Sauvignon blanc, Riesling, and Chardonnay. The red noble grapes were Pinot noir, Cabernet Sauvignon, and Merlot.

== Consumer recognition ==
The popularity and presence of international varieties in winemaking regions throughout the world have contributed to high levels of consumer recognition for some of these varieties that often appear on wine labels as varietal wines. The recognition is so great for varieties like Cabernet Sauvignon and Chardonnay that many consumers believe these names are either wine regions or brand names themselves. Wine expert Frank Prial of The New York Times notes that the name recognition of a grape like Chardonnay is so powerful that it "transcends the product or its producers".

== Criticism ==
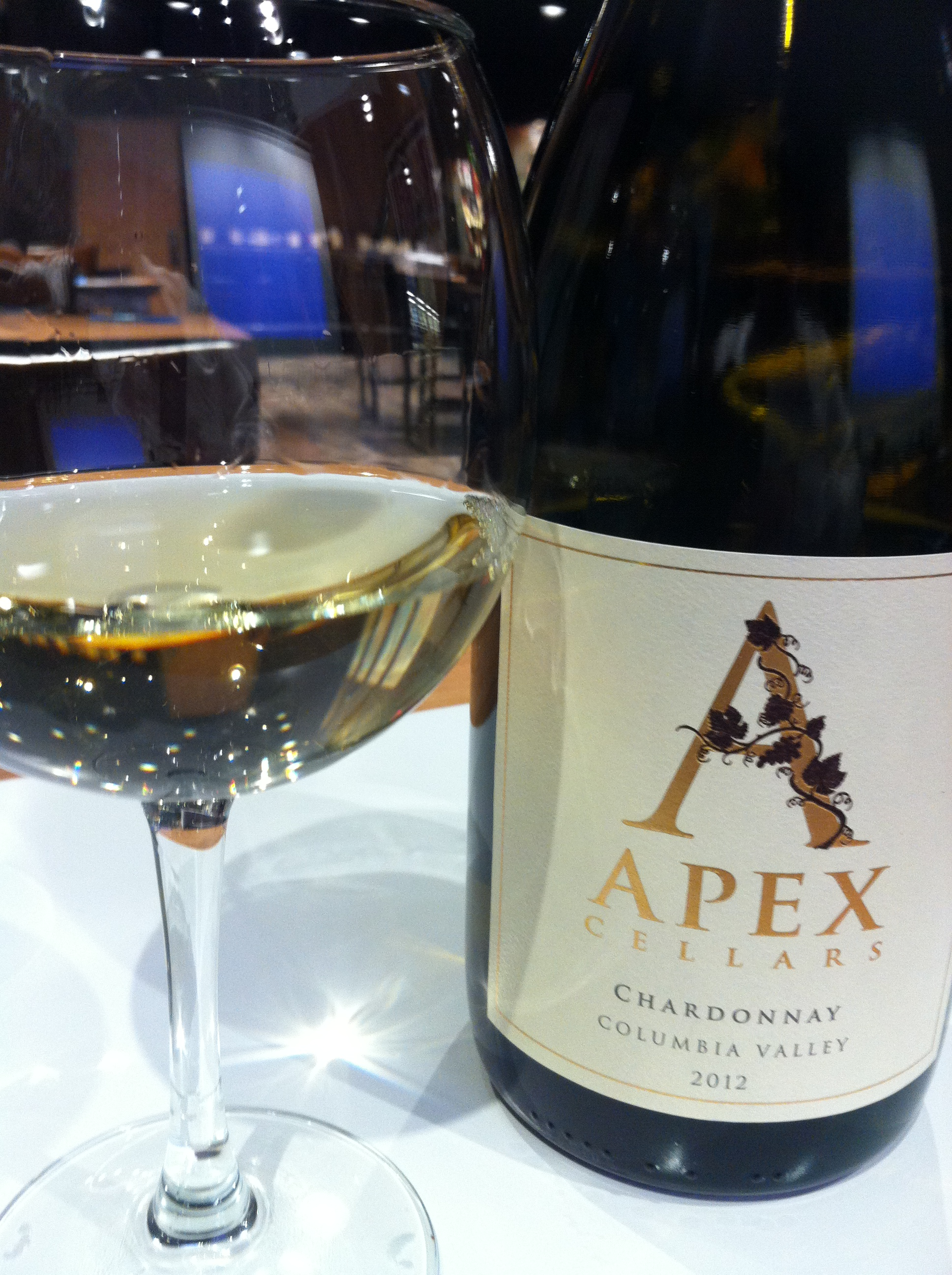
The familiar flavors and name recognition of Chardonnay have seen the variety pop up in regions throughout the world.

International varieties have been criticized as both a symbol and instigator of the globalization of wine, in which local indigenous grape varieties are grubbed up in favor of the big names demanded by international markets. In the late 20th century, during the "Chardonnay-boom", vineyards throughout the world and particularly in emerging wine industries rushed to plant acres of Chardonnay in order to capture some of the market. Examples of this occurred in south Italy and Spain where ancient Negroamaro, Primitivo, Grenache and Mataro vineyards were ripped up in favor of new Chardonnay plantings. This created a backlash of sorts against not only Chardonnay, but also other international varieties. Wine expert Oz Clarke described a view of Chardonnay in this light as "...the ruthless coloniser and destroyer of the world's vineyards and the world's palates."

Even within the industry, there are protests against the trend of planting international varieties at the expense of local varieties with winemakers such as the Languedoc producer Aimé Guibert comparing the trend to "burning cathedrals".

== See also ==
- Mondovino – a film about the globalization of wine that deals with the topic of international varieties
