= Criolla Grande =

Variety of grape

- Grape (Vitis)
- Color of berry skin: Noir
- Species: Vitis vinifera
- Also called: See list of synonyms
- Origin: Argentina
- Original pedigree: Mission × Muscat of Alexandria
- VIVC number: 3241

Criolla Grande (also known as Criolla and Criolla Grande Sanjuanina) is a red wine grape commonly found in Argentina. It is different from the Chilean wine grape Pais, also known as Criolla Chica, but ampelographers believe that both grapes share a common parent, and it is now listed as a crossing of Mission and Muscat of Alexandria. As of 2006, Criolla was the third most widely planted Argentine wine grape (22,500 hectares) after Cereza (30,000 hectares) and the more widely exported Malbec (24,400 hectares). It is primarily found in the Mendoza region. The grape has pink skin, which is thicker than in its Chilean cousin, Pais, and is used to produce deeply colored white wine. It is sometimes used to produce a light colored rosé. The grape is rarely exported outside of Argentina where it is used to produce massive quantities of box and jug wines.

== History ==
The grape belong to the Criollas group of varieties. Along with Chile's Pais and the Mission grape of California, the grape is believed to be a descendant of the Spanish "common black grape" brought to Mexico in 1520 by the Spanish conquistador Hernán Cortés. Although it has previously been speculated that Criolla Grande as such was brought to the Americas, the presence of Mission in its pedigree makes it likely that the crossing resulting in Criolla Grande took place in America.

== Synonyms ==
Criolla Grande is also known under the synonyms Criolla Grande Sanjuanina, Criolla San Juanino, Criolla Sanjuanina, Italia, Sanjuanina Rosada, and Uva Tierna.
