= Luján de Cuyo Department =

Luján de Cuyo Departamento Luján de Cuyo
- Department
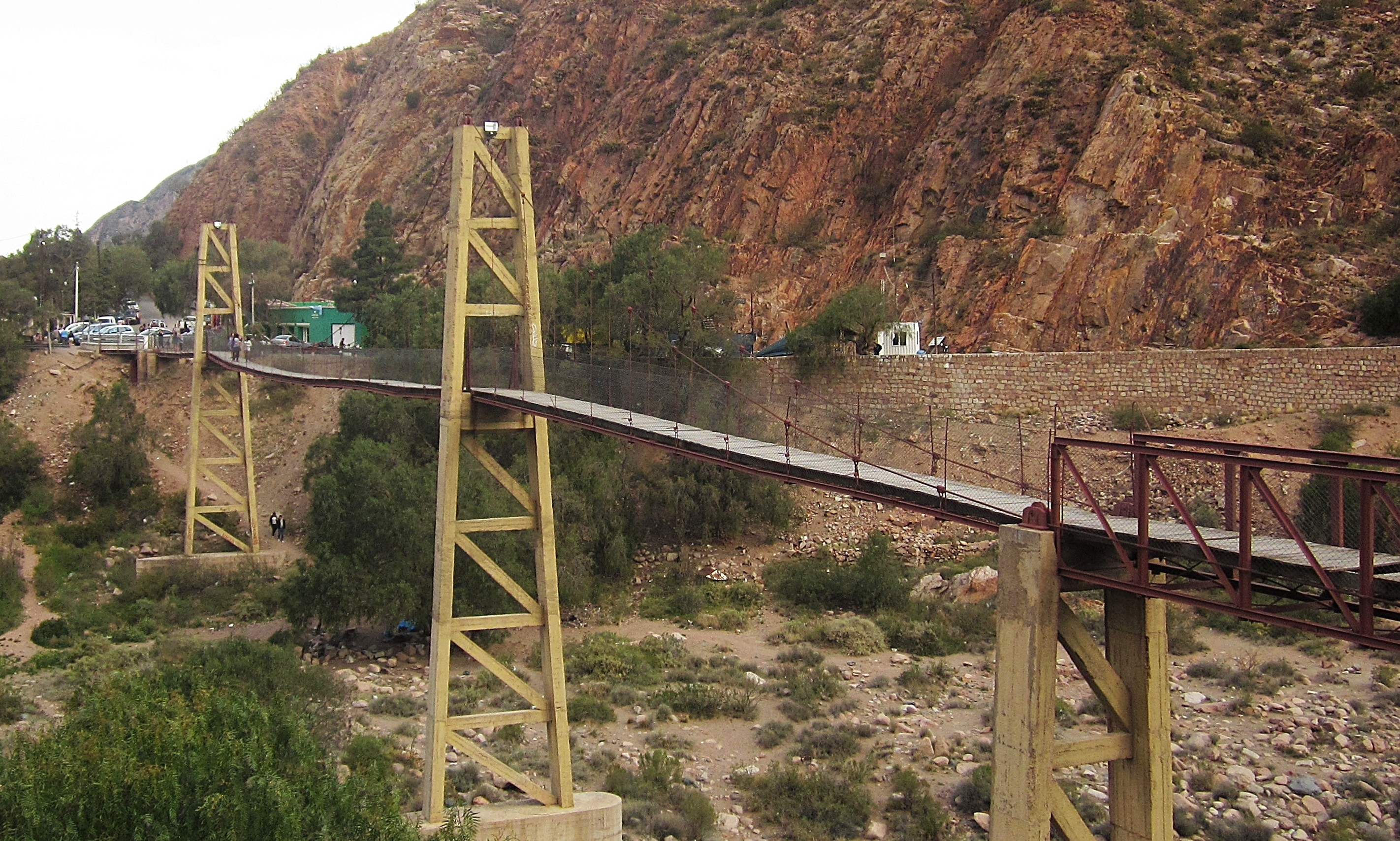
- Interactive map of Luján de Cuyo
- Coordinates: 33°30′S 62°58′W
- Country: Argentina
- Established: May 11, 1855
- Founder: ?
- Seat: Luján de Cuyo

Government
  - Intendant: Esteban Allasino (PRO)

Area
  - Total: 4,847 km^{2} (1,871 sq mi)

Population (2022 census [INDEC])
  - Total: 175,056
  - Density: 36.12/km^{2} (93.54/sq mi)
- Demonym: lujanense
- Postal Code: M5507
- IFAM: MZA008
- Area Code: 02614
- Patron saint: Nuestra Señora de Luján de Cuyo
- Website: www.lujandecuyo.gob.ar

Luján de Cuyo is a department located in the northwest of Mendoza Province in Argentina.

The provincial subdivision has a population of about 104,000 inhabitants in an area of 4,847 square kilometres (1,871 sq mi), and its capital city is Luján de Cuyo, which is located around 1,107 km (688 mi) from the Federal Capital.

== Districts ==
- Agrelo
- Carrodilla
- Chacras de Coria
- El Carrizal
- La Puntilla
- Las Compuertas
- Luján de Cuyo
- Mayor Drummond
- Perdriel
- Potrerillos
- Ugarteche
- Vistalba

== See also ==
- Mendoza wine
