= Dealu Mare wine region =

Wine region in Romania

Muntenia area within Romania

Prahova County

The Dealu Mare wine region is located within the Muntenia area of Romania. It is located around the municipality of Valea Călugărească in Prahova County, best known for its red wines, and the municipality of Pietroasele in Buzău County, best known for white wines. Typically identified as one of the most important wine regions in Romania, it encompasses about 400 square kilometres under the Southern Carpathians.

== Grape varieties ==
Red grape varieties grown in Dealu Mare:

- Burgund Mare
- Cabernet Sauvignon
- Feteasca neagra
- Merlot
- Pinot noir
- Zweigelt

White grape varieties grown in Dealu Mare:

- Busuioaca de Bohotin
- Chardonnay
- Feteasca alba
- Feteasca regala
- Muscat Ottonel
- Pinot gris
- Riesling Italico
- Sauvignon blanc
- Tămâioasă Românească
