= Jidvei wines =

Wines made in Romania

Jidvei wines are produced in Romania, within the Târnave wine region, along the two Târnave rivers: Târnave Mica and Târnava Mare. The Târnave region is situated in Jidvei, Alba County.

== History ==
Jidvei Wines is considered to be the second motherland of the Tarnave Wine Region. Tarnave recognizes that in the second half of the thirteenth century there was a mass colonization by the Saxons from the Mosel Rhine Valley. The Saxons founded Jidvei also known in German as Seiden.

The first agricultural unit, with wine-growing profile of great proportions, was founded in 1949 and has developed consistently, and as of the 2000s, has a cultivated area of approximately 2000 hectares.

The 1999 privatization of the wine-growing and fruit-growing sector and of the cellars offered the Târnave Vineyard new opportunities of development and affirmation of its capacities which led to increase exports and domestic sales.

== Natural environment ==
The vineyard is spread on a surface of about 2000 hectares (with around 250 hectares renewed every year) and it is situated at an altitude between 200-500 meters, with most of the vineyards set on southern exposure slopes, which makes the sun rays and atmospheric circulation to favor vine cultures.

The land benefits of a continental-plateau type climate with an average temperature of +9 °C (January −4 °C, July +18 °C). The moderate temperature during the grapes' maturing period determine slow oxidation reactions, helping to a continual accumulation of sugars and aromas and to a not so accentuated reduction of acidity. The soils are divided into three categories: forest brown, forest brown with different degrees of podzolisation and river-bank soils, all three types of soil enabling vine cultivation.

== Vine-growing and wine-making technologies ==
The production of grapes per hectare is between 3000 kilograms and 9000 kilograms with an average of around 6500 kilograms per hectare.

The constant concern for increasing not only the quantity, but also the quality of the Jidvei wines was translated through an extensive investment program that began with rehabilitating the vine-growing areas - a project worth 11 million Euro - and went on with investments in modern agricultural machinery and environmental-friendly vine-growing technologies.

The wine-making technologies have also been updated and, currently, the wine cellars are equipped with the latest wine-making machineries controlling every aspect of the process from fermentation to bottling.

These modern technologies together with the classical methods of aging in barrels or bottles – still preserved for some products like brandy or sparkling wine – do nothing more than to supplement the micro climate of the region and the high qualification of the oenology experts giving Jidvei wines remarkable organoleptic properties proven by numerous national and international awards.

== Wine sortiments ==
Sauvignon blanc It is a dry, semi-dry or semi-sweet wine that brought the fame of Jidvei, both in Romania and abroad. It is described to have a herbal, aromatic and fruity flavor. It is a lively wine, mildly acid, extremely palatable and round. After appropriate aging, the bouquet and flavor become melon-like.

Muscat It is a vigorous and delicate wine. Its dominant autumnal taste has a soft lemon flowers aroma.

Riesling It is a variety with specific characteristics for this vineyard, mainly used for the production of dry wines, but could give semi-dry wines as well, if harvested late. It is lively, fresh, highly acid, with a slight exotic fruit flavor that is well appreciated both in Romania and abroad.

Fetească regală It is a local variety which gained a special place among dry wines for its freshness, smoothness and fruity flavor. It has a remarkable balance and fruity flavor. Its acidity, slightly higher than in other Jidvei wines, makes it lively and attractive to numerous consumers.

Muscat Ottonel It is a wine that made Jidvei its second homeland. Its color goes from straw yellow to gold, the aroma from dry, semi-dry to sweet. Its flavor is that of ripe grapes, with attractive taste. It is an aromatic wine, much like scented lemon flowers or sage essence.

Gewürztraminer It is produced in a wide variety, from dry to sweet. Its color is yellow-green to gold or amber-gold, after several aging years. Its specific and distinct aroma resembles that of roses. The taste is slightly spicy, but otherwise smooth and velvety. Through aging it becomes full-bodied, slightly bitter and has a hazelnut flavor.

Pinot gris it is a very attractive wine, thanks to its noble and delicate taste from dry to semi-sweet. The color of this wine varies from straw yellow to gold.

Riesling Târnave Castle Reminiscent of the Transylvanian knights' banquets, is a semi-dry wine that combines in its aroma ripe apple flavor with vine flower scent. It has been described as crystal clear, with yellow-whitish glows end emerald irisations, filled with liveliness and distinction.
