= Schiau =

Schiau may refer to several villages in Romania:

- Schiau, a village in Bascov Commune, Argeș County
- Schiau, a village in the town of Urlați, Prahova County
- Schiau, a village in Valea Călugărească Commune, Prahova County
