= Merlot blanc =

Variety of grape

Merlot blanc (French pronunciation: [mɛʁlo blɑ̃]) is a white French wine grape variety that came from a natural crossing of the Bordeaux wine grape Merlot and the Cognac grape Folle blanche. The grape is distinct from Merlot gris which is a pink-skinned colour mutation of the red wine grape Merlot and is sometimes used in vin gris and rosé wines. Plantings of Merlot blanc were first discovered in 1891 but cuttings of the vine have not been widely propagated and the variety is very rare. It is not used to make the sweet White Zinfandel-style wine White Merlot that is made by some California wine producers. Those wines are made from a saignee of red Merlot wine. It is also distinct from the pale, dry Bianco di Merlot produced in the Ticino DOC of Southeastern Switzerland, which is also produced from red Merlot grapes by minimising skin contact during vinification.

== Relationship to other grapes ==
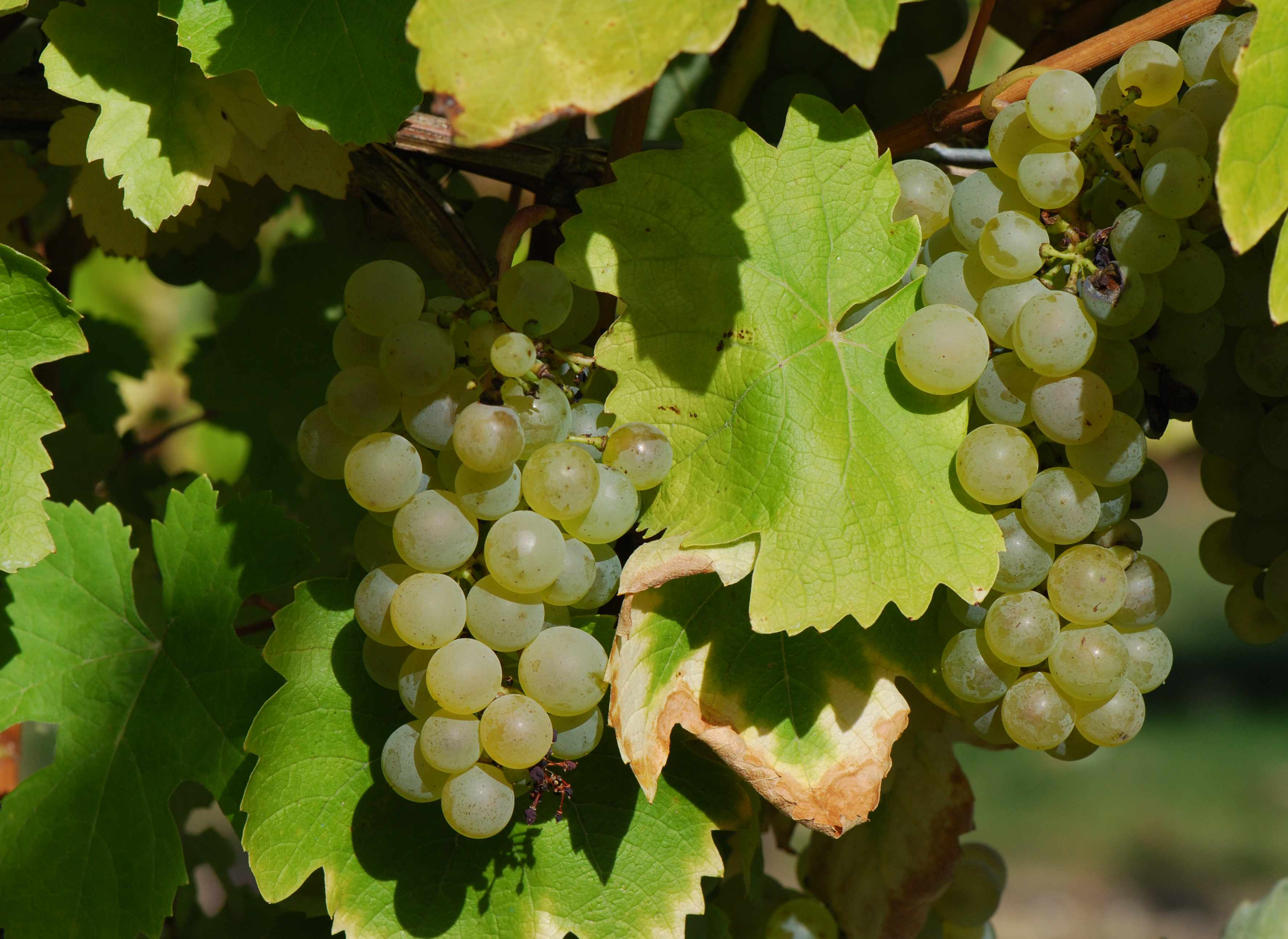
Folle blanche, one of the parent varieties of Merlot blanc.

When Merlot blanc was first discovered, it was thought that the vine was a white-berried color mutation of Merlot in a similar relation to how Grenache blanc is a color mutation of Grenache and Pinot blanc is a mutation of Pinot noir. However, DNA analysis conducted by the University of California-Davis and noted ampelographers such as Carole Meredith confirmed that Merlot blanc was distinct from Merlot (itself the result of a crossing of the Bordeaux grape Cabernet Franc and the Brittany/Charente grape Magdeleine Noire des Charentes) but rather was an offspring of Merlot. Inheritance analysis of 55 genetic markers spread out over 9 chromosomes, showed that Merlot blanc was the result of a crossing of Merlot with the Cognac/Armagnac grape Folle blanche.

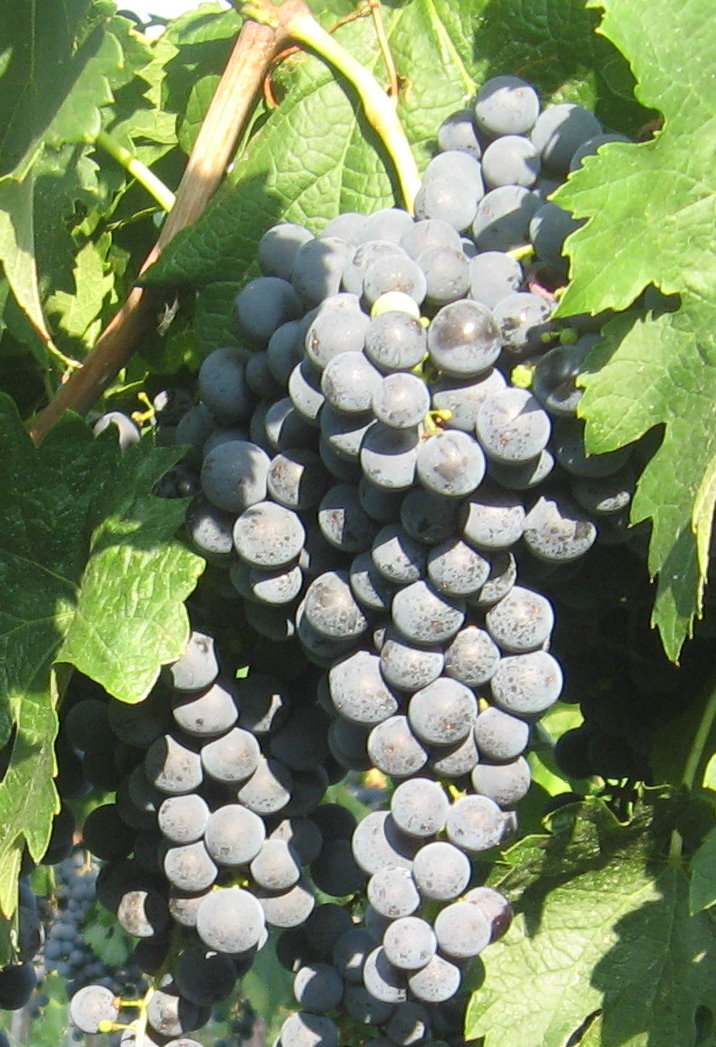
Instead of being a white-berried color mutation, Merlot blanc is actually an offspring of Merlot (pictured).

== Wine regions ==
Even though plantings of Merlot blanc are scarce, the grape is still a permitted a variety in the Appellation d'origine contrôlée (AOC) wines of several Bordeaux wine regions including the general AOC Bordeaux (but not for wines labeled Bordeaux Supérieur). Here Merlot blanc can be used in up to 30% of the blend along with Semillon (which must make up at least 70% of the blend itself), Sauvignon blanc, Muscadelle, Colombard, Mauzac, Ondenc and Ugni blanc. Merlot blanc destined for AOC wine production are limited to harvest yields no greater than 55 hl/ha (approximately 3.7 tons/acre with the finished wines needing to attain a minimum alcohol level of at least 11%.

Other Bordeaux AOCs that permit the usage of Merlot blanc in their designated white wines include Bordeaux-Haut-Benauge (maximum harvest yield of 50 hl/ha), Côtes de Bourg (but not the Côtes de Blaye) and Entre-Deux-Mers (which like the Côtes de Bourg limits harvest yield to 60 hl/ha). In all these AOCs Merlot blanc plays a supporting role to Semillon, Sauvignon blanc and Muscadelle.

== Synonyms ==
Over the years Merlot blanc has been known under a variety of synonyms including: Merlau blanc, Merlaut blanc and Merlot bianco.
