= Romanian wine =

Wine making in Romania

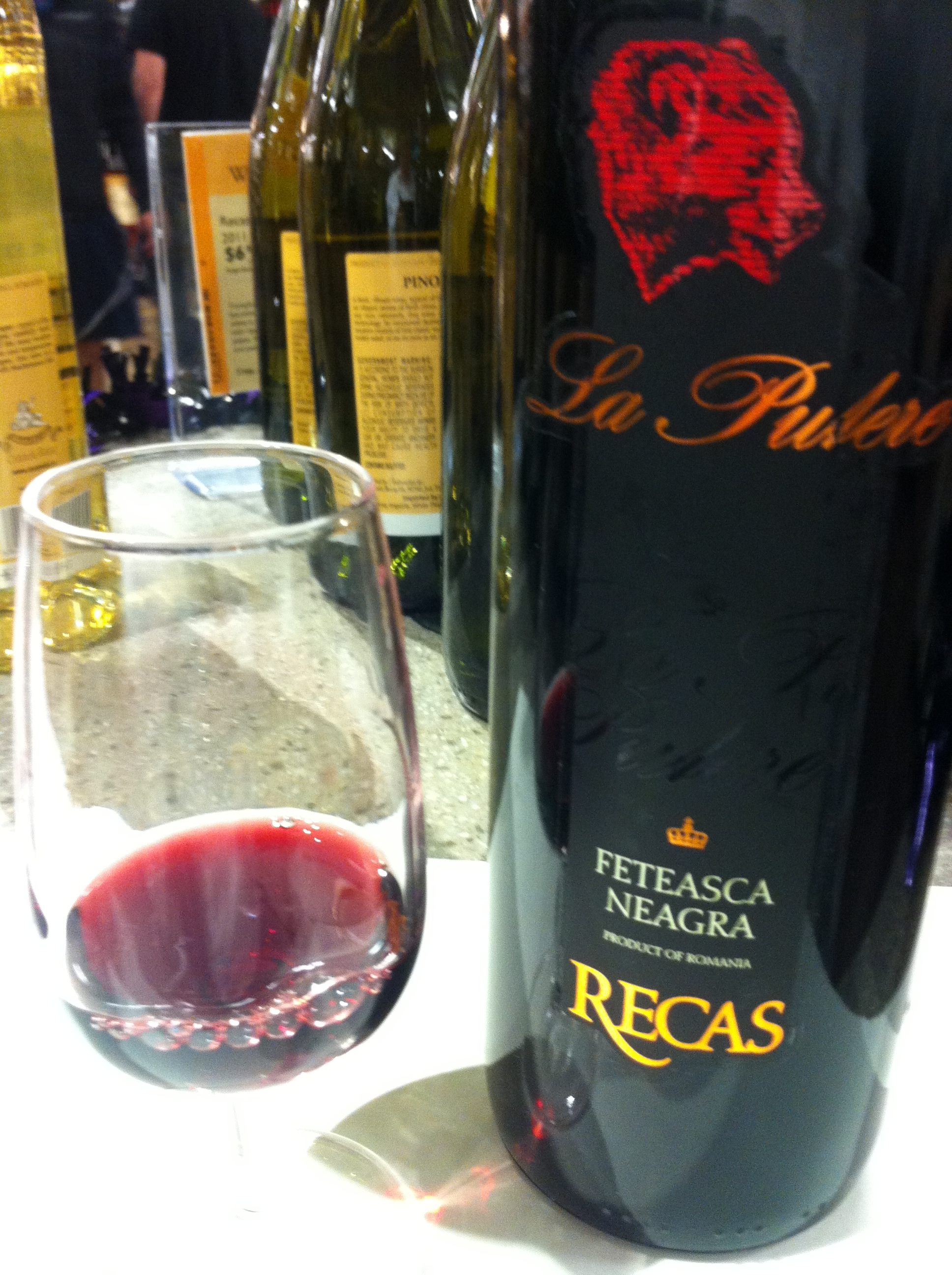
A Fetească neagră from Recaș

Romania is one of the world's largest wine producers and sixth-largest among European wine-producing countries, after Italy, France, Spain, Germany and Portugal. It produced more wine than New Zealand and Austria but is lesser-known on the world wine stage. In 2021 it produced around 4.5 million hectolitres of wine. In recent years, Romania has attracted many European business people and wine buyers, due to the affordable prices of both vineyards and wines compared to other wine-producing nations such as France, Germany, and Italy.

Romania's most cultivated grape varieties are for white wines Fetească Albă, Fetească Regală, Riesling, Aligoté, Sauvignon, Muscat, Pinot Gris, Chardonnay, Tămâioasă Românească, Grasă de Cotnari, Galbenă de Odobești. Also, the main grape varieties for red wines are Merlot, Cabernet Sauvignon, Băbească Neagră, Fetească Neagră, Pinot Noir.

== History ==
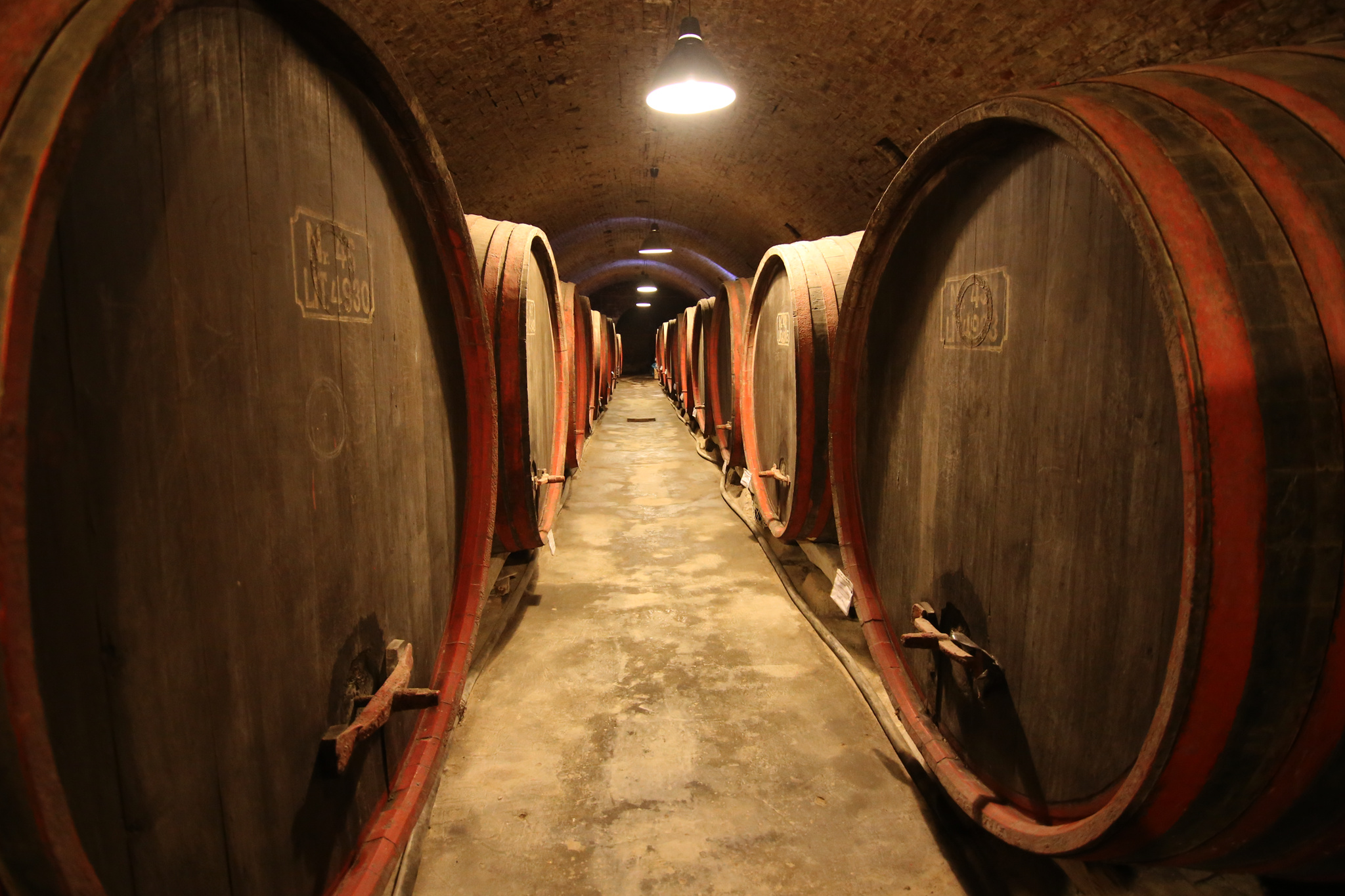
The winery of Hagianoff mansion in Manasia, Ialomița County, established in 1899

Romania has one of the oldest wine-making traditions in the world and its viticulture dates back more than 6,000 years. Due to suitable climate, relief and soils, viticulture became a current activity of the local inhabitants mainly in the hilly areas. Numerous local wine grape varieties have been obtained during medieval time by empirical selection, becoming representatives for Romanian wine regions. Up to the phylloxera crisis, each Romanian wine region had its own wine grape assortment, that generated specific local wines. Since the medieval period, wine has been the traditional alcoholic beverage of the Romanians.

In the 1880s phylloxera (a pale yellow sap-sucking insect that attacks the roots of vines) was introduced accidentally also in Romania (1872, Chitorani, Dealul Mare wine-growing region), and over a period of several years destroyed the local viticulture. Restoration of the Romanian viticulture lasted until the beginning of the 20th century, and was done mainly by planting French wine grape varieties such as Merlot, Chardonnay, Pinot noir, Sauvignon, Cabernet Sauvignon etc. Besides these, phylloxera-resistant grape hybrids were also planted. Several traditional Romanian wine grapes did survive the phylloxera crisis, and are still cultivated in Romania in the 21st Century.

Romania has about 187,000 hectares of vine plantations; that ranks it on sixth place between the European wine-producing countries. With a wine production of about 4.5 million hl/year, Romania is the thirteenth largest wine-producing country in the world.

== Wine-producing regions ==
Main wine regions of Romania are:

The Transylvanian Plateau region (Podișul Transilvaniei)

- Târnave
- Alba
- Aiud
- Sebeș-Apold
- Lechința

The Moldavian Hills region (Dealurile Moldovei)

- Cotnari
- Iași
- Huși
- Zeletin
- Colinele Tutovei
- Dealul Bujorului
- Iveşti
- Nicoreşti
- Covurlui
- Panciu
- Odobești
- Cotești

The Munteniei & Olteniei Hills region (Dealurile Munteniei și Olteniei)

- Dealurile Buzăului
- Dealu Mare
- Ștefănești
- Sâmburești
- Drăgășani
- Dealurile Craiovei
- Podgoria Severinului
- Plaiurile Drâncei

The Banat Hills region (Dealurile Banatului)

- Moldova Nouă
- Recaș
- Silagiu (part of Buziaş commune)
- Teremia
- Tirol (part of Doclin commune)

The Crișana Hills region (Dealurile Crișanei) and the Maramureș region (Maramureșului)

- Miniș-Măderat
- Diosig
- Șimleu Silvaniei
- Valea lui Mihai

The Dobruja Hills region (Colinele Dobrogei)

- Sarica-Niculițel
- Istria-Babadag
- Murfatlar

The Danube Terraces region (Terasele Dunării)

- Greaca
- Ostrov

Additional favorable sandy regions in central-southern Romania (Regiunea nisipurilor și altor terenuri favorabile din sudul țării)

- Sadova-Corabia
- Calafat
- Podgoria Dacilor (in Mehedinți County, Oltenia)

== Wines ==
The wine grape assortments of Romanian wine-growing regions encompasses many varieties for white, red and aromatic wines. Each wine-growing region has its own traditional grape varieties: Zghihara de Husi and Busuioaca de Bohotin for the Huși wine-growing region; Fetească neagră for the Iași wine-growing region; Grasa de Cotnari and Frâncușa for the Cotnari wine-growing region; Crâmpoșie for the Drăgășani wine-growing region; Băbeasca Neagră for the Nicorești wine-growing region; Iordană și Ardeleancă for the Târnave wine-growing region; or Mustoasă de Măderat for the Miniș wine-growing region.

Each wine-growing region additionally cultivates international wine grape varieties, mainly: Sauvignon, Chardonnay, Riesling italico, Pinot gris and Traminer for white wines; and Cabernet Sauvignon, Merlot and Pinot noir for red wines. All these local and international varieties form the basis of many wines, presented mainly under the name of the wine grape variety (e.g. Sauvignon, Feteasca albă, Tămâioasă românească) and less commonly under the name of producer (e.g. DAVINO, ALIRA, LACERTA) or under a marketing name (e.g. Serafim, Bon Viveur, Gramma, René Faure etc.).

=== Traditional Whites ===
The most known Romanian wine grape varieties for white wines are Fetească albă, Crâmpoșie and Fetească regală. Feteasca albă and Fetească regală produce dry or semi-dry wines, with rich floral aromas. They have a moderate alcohol content (11.5 to 12%) and moderate acidity. Crâmpoșia is known for producing fresh and fruity wines, with moderate alcohol content and pronounced acidity.

=== Traditional Reds ===
The most known Romanian wine grape variety for red wines is Fetească neagră, originating in the Uricani, Iași wine region. It produces ″dry, demi-dry or sweet wines, with an alcohol content of 12-14%, a deep red colour with ruby shades, and a black currant flavour, which becomes richer and smoother with ageing″.

=== Traditional Aromatics ===
Among the Romanian aromatic wine grape varieties, the most appreciated and cultivated are Tămâioasă Românească and Busuioacă de Bohotin.

== Wineries ==
- Alira
- Avincis
- Casa de Vinuri Ștefănești
- Casa Isărescu
- Catleya Corcova
- Corcova Roy Dâmboviceanu
- Cotnari Casa de Vinuri
- Crama Andronic
- Crama Aramic
- Crama Atelier
- Crama Basilescu
- Crama Bauer
- Crama Budureasca
- Crama Carastelec
- Crama Ceptura (since 2005)
- Crama Daiconi
- Crama Darie
- Crama Dealul Dorului
- Crama Delta Dunării - La Sapata
- Crama Dobra
- Crama Familiei Hetei
- Crama Fort Silvan
- Crama Frâncu
- Crama Vie Vin Lechința
- Crama Gîrboiu
- Crama Hermeziu
- Crama Jelna
- Crama La Salina
- Crama Nachbil
- Crama Oprișor
- Cramele Recaș
- Crama Rătești
- Crama Rasova
- Crama Tata și Fiul
- Crama Terra Natura
- Crama Thesaurus
- Davino
- Divine Area
- Domeniile Averesti
- Domeniul Ciumbrud
- Domeniile Clos des Colombes
- Domeniul Coroanei Segarcea
- Domeniile Dealu Mare Urlați
- Domeniile Franco - Române
- Domeniile Sara
- Domeniile Săhăteni - Aurelia Vișinescu
- Domeniile Sămburești
- Domeniile Tohani
- Domeniul Bogdan
- Domeniul Vlădoi
- Elite Wine
- Familia Petru
- Casa Olteanu
- Halewood România
- Jidvei
- LacertA Winery
- Licorna Winehouse
- Liliac
- Negrini
- Ostrovit
- Petro Vaselo
- Pivnițele Birăuaș
- Podgoria Silvania
- Rotenberg
- Senator Wine
- Serve
- Știrbey
- Veritas Panciu
- Via Viticola - Sarica Niculițel
- Villa Vinea
- Viile Metamorfosis
- Vinarte
- Vincon Vrancea
- Vinia
- Wine Princess - Balla Geza

== See also ==
- Cuisine of Romania
- Old World wine
- Winemaking
- Agriculture in Romania
