= Blaye (wine) =

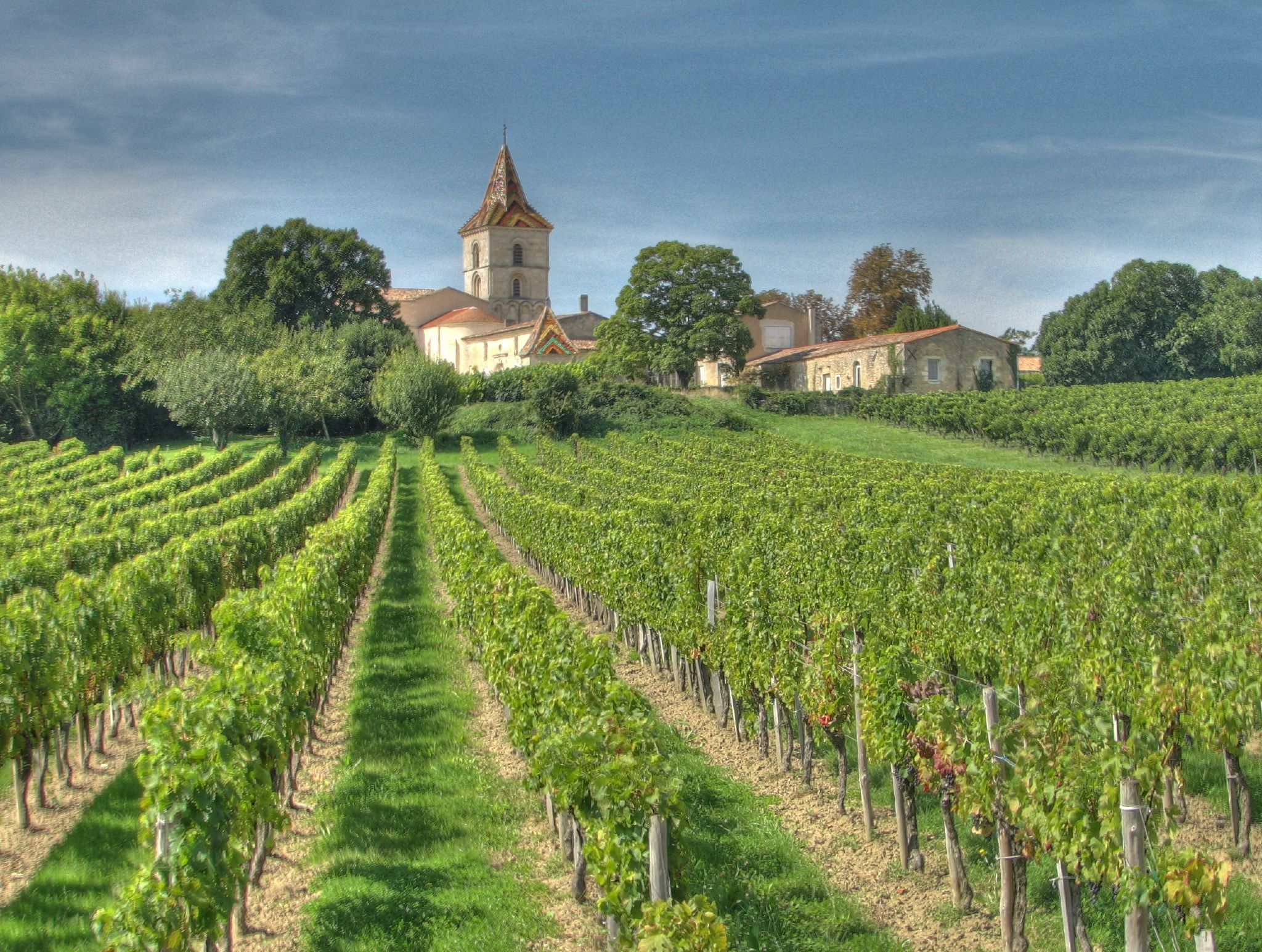
Vineyard in Blaye.

Blaye (French: [blaj]) is a wine region in Bordeaux, centred on the town of Blaye, producing both red and white wine, plus a small amount of rosé and sparkling wine. It is located on the right bank of the River Gironde, and surrounds Côtes de Bourg.

== Appellations d'origine contrôlée ==
A number of different Appellations d'origine contrôlée (AOCs) apply, or have previously applied, to Blaye. In 1936, 3 AOCs were created for this region: Blaye AOC, Côtes de Blaye AOC and Premières Côtes de Blaye AOC. These all covered the same geographical area, with Premières Côtes de Blaye including the most prestigious properties. These AOCs were revised in the 1990s, and Blaye AOC was used for the top reds (while still being used for some simple dry whites). In 2007, the AOCs were revised again. Blaye AOC is now exclusively red, and Côtes de Blaye AOC is exclusively white. Premières Côtes de Blaye has been absorbed into Côtes de Bordeaux AOC, which covers both red and white wines, and may have the word Blaye appended, subject to stricter controls. Rosé wines are not covered by any of these AOCs, and must be sold under a generic Bordeaux appellation.

== Geography ==
The area is hillier than the Médoc, rising to a height of over 70m above sea-level. The soil is mostly clay over limestone. The area under vines is around 7000 hectares. A little river, called Rau de Brouillon separates Blaye from the Bourgeais.

== Wines ==
Red wine is made predominantly from Merlot, Cabernet Sauvignon and Cabernet Franc, with small quantities of Malbec, Petit Verdot and Carménère. White wine under the label Côtes de Blaye is made predominantly from Colombard and Ugni blanc, whereas white wine under the label Côtes de Bordeaux (Blaye) is made predominantly from Sauvignon blanc, Semillon and Muscadelle. The red wines are fresh and fruity, and should be drunk relatively young, while the whites (which are usually dry) are light and softly fruity.

== Châteaux ==
There is no classification for the châteaux of Blaye, and this is therefore necessarily a somewhat arbitrary list, but the following are considered noteworthy by one or other of the references:

Château du Grand Barrail, Château Barbé, Château le Menaudat, Château Segonzac, Château Bourdieu, Château l'Escadre, Château Bel-Air la Royère, Château Bertinerie, Château Haut-Bertinerie, Château Gigault, Château les Jonqueyres, Château Mondésir-Gazin, Château Rolande-la-Garde, Château Crusquet Sabourin, Château Les Moines, Château Gauthier
