= Fetească =

Fetească can refer to

- One of the following traditional Romanian/Moldovan wine grapes or wines:
  - Fetească Albă
  - Fetească Neagră
  - Fetească Regală
- Feteasca, Hîncești, a village in Leuşeni Commune, Hînceşti district, Moldova
