= Valea Călugărească =

- Commune
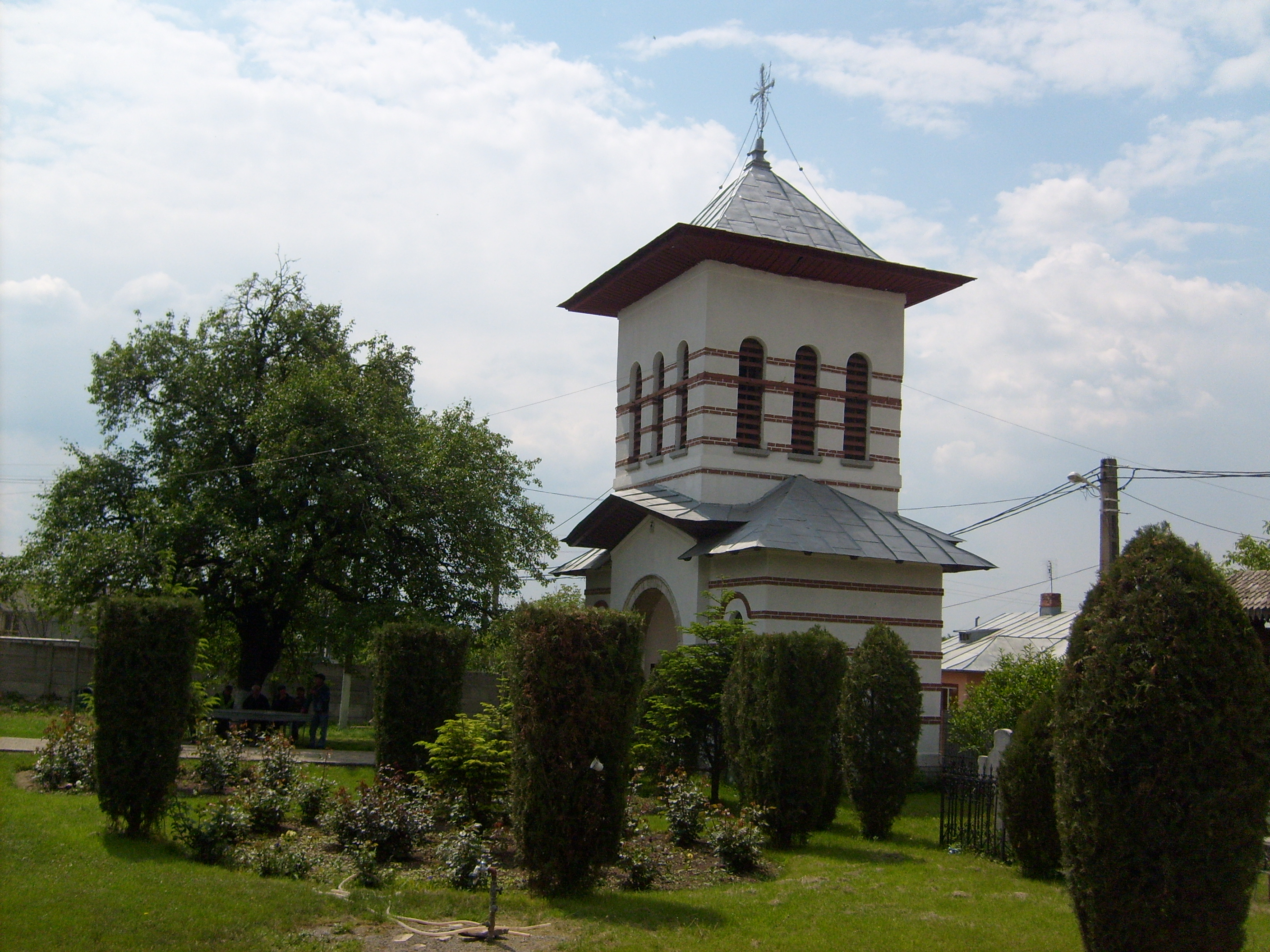
- Church in Valea Călugărească

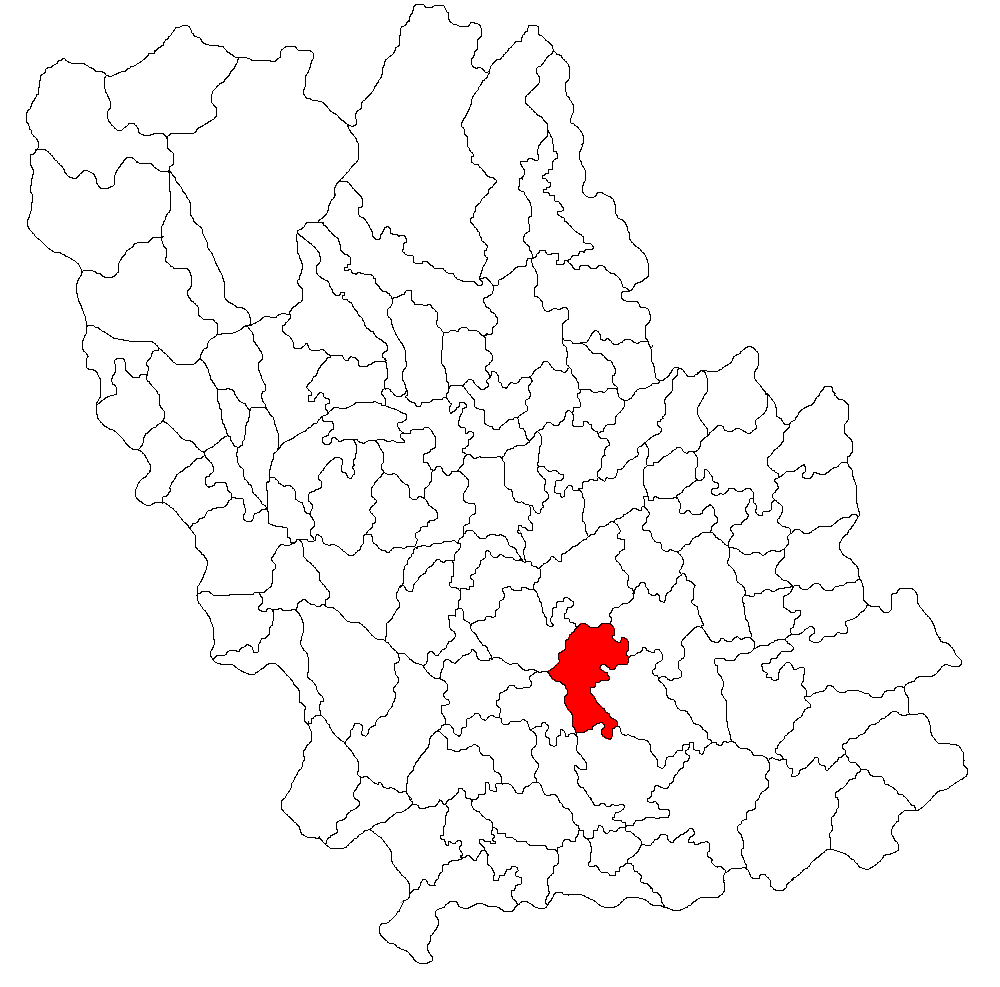
- Location in Prahova County

- Location in Romania
- Coordinates: 44°57′N 26°13′E
- Country: Romania
- County: Prahova

Government
  - Mayor (2020–2024): Ioana Neagu (Ind.)
- Area: 54.17 km^{2} (20.92 sq mi)
- Elevation: 162 m (531 ft)
- Population (2021-12-01): 10,096
  - Density: 186.4/km^{2} (482.7/sq mi)
- Time zone: UTC+02:00 (EET)
  - Summer (DST): UTC+03:00 (EEST)
- Postal code: 107620
- Area code: +(40) 244
- Vehicle reg.: PH
- Website: www.primariavaleacalugareasca.ro

Valea Călugărească is a commune in Prahova County, Muntenia, Romania. It is composed of fifteen villages: Arva, Coslegi, Dârvari, Pantazi, Rachieri, Radila, Schiau, Valea Călugărească, Valea Largă, Valea Mantei, Valea Nicovani, Valea Poienii, Valea Popii, Valea Ursoii, and Vârfurile.

Valea Călugărească produces some of the highest quality red wines in Romania, such as Pinot noir and Fetească neagră, but also whites such as Pinot gris and Sauvignon blanc, and two of its own varieties, Fetească albă and Fetească regală. To promote its wine related traditions, Valea Călugărească hosts the largest wine festival in the country every September.

Historical population
Year	Pop.	±%
2002	10,551	—
2011	10,657	+1.0%
2021	10,096	−5.3%
Source: Census data
