= Côtes de Bourg =

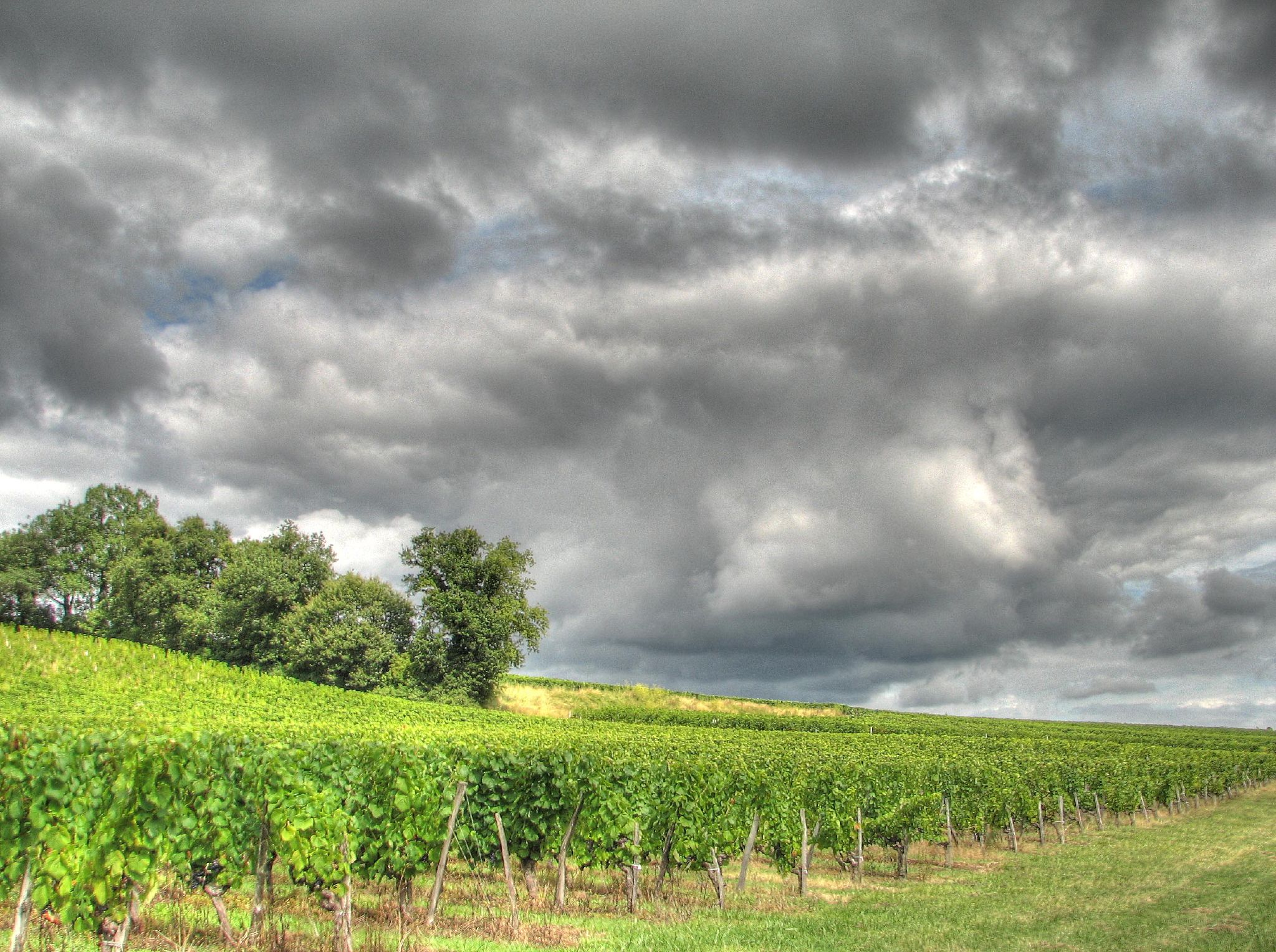
Vineyards in the Côtes de Bourg.

Côtes de Bourg (French pronunciation: [kot də buʁ]) is an Appellation d'origine contrôlée (AOC) for Bordeaux wine situated around the small town of Bourg-sur-Gironde near Bordeaux, France. The first vineyards in the area were founded by the Romans. In the Middle Ages, Bourg was a major port for wine and the vineyards developed at the same tempo as the estuary traffic. The Côtes de Bourg appellation, in the north of the patchwork of Bordeaux wines, took its first steps on the east bank of the Gironde. At the time, the inhabitants of Bourg were fishermen, sailors or winemakers and the latter benefited from the perfect combination of a commercially minded town and a soil made for the vine.

== History ==
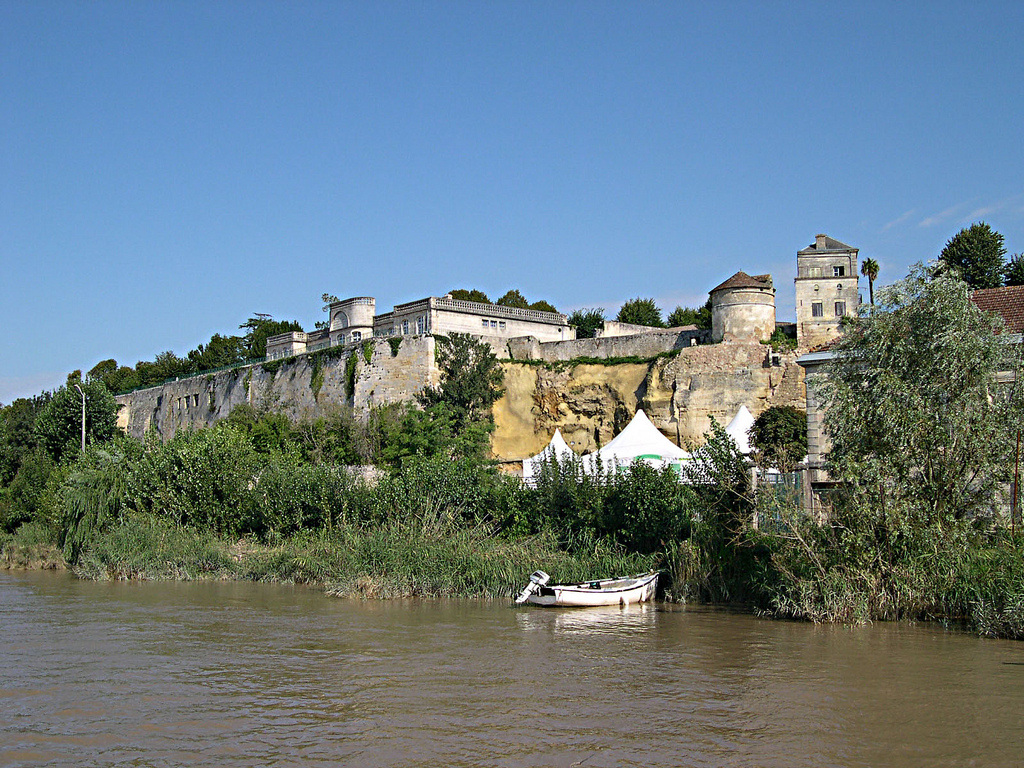
Remnant of some of the fortification along the Gironde in the Côtes de Bourg.

Historians date the first vineyards from the 2nd century AD, when the Roman occupants planted the first “Vitis Biturica”. They understood that the combination of rich soil, climate and exposition of the east bank were ideal for cultivating the grape. Until the 9th century, the wine trade operated alongside the tin trade which in turn complemented quarrying. Nowadays, the area has many abandoned limestone quarries that provided stone for building the city of Bordeaux. All of this makes up the history of the growth of winemaking in the area since the appellation has a range of gravel, alluvium, clay and limestone soils.

== Geography ==
Bourg is located 20 km (12 mi) north-west of Bordeaux, at the confluence of the rivers Dordogne and Garrone with an average altitude of 20 m above sea level.

== Wine ==
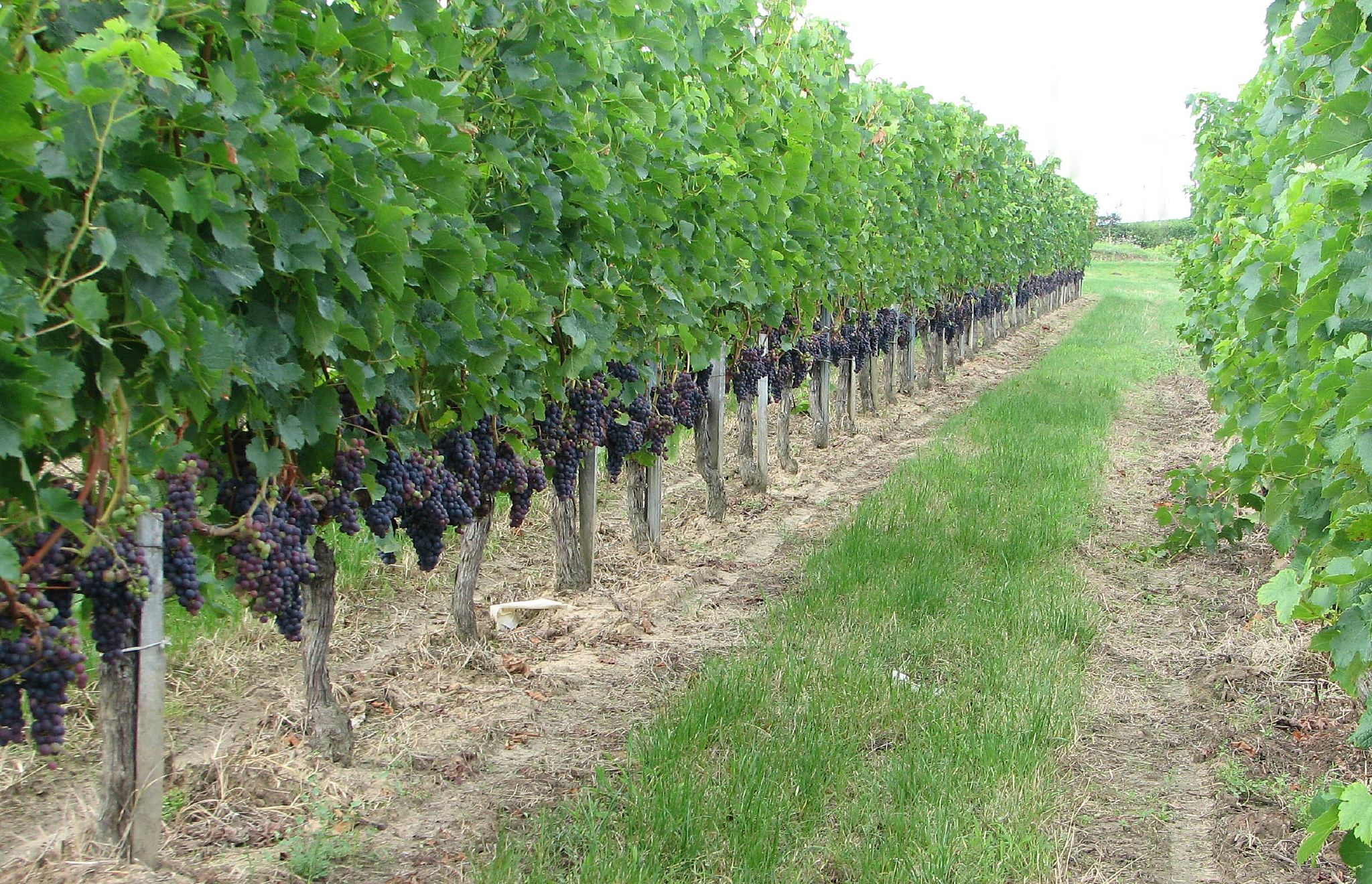
Merlot grapes growing in a Côtes de Bourg vineyard.

Red Côtes de Bourg are garnet in colour and are predominantly based on the Merlot grape, blended with smaller quantities of Cabernet Sauvignon and Cabernet Franc. Some Chateaux still use Malbec as part of the blend.

A small amount of white wine is made from Semillon, Sauvignon blanc, Muscadelle, Merlot blanc, Ugni blanc and Colombard grapes. There are around 200 Chateaux producers in the appellation.

== Terroir ==
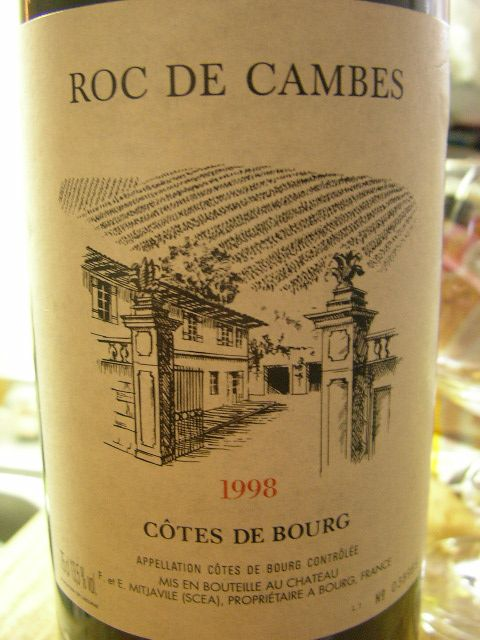
A wine labeled from the Côtes de Bourg AOC.

The vine has been established in le Bourgeais for centuries and the current varieties have been selected because of their performance in relation to the soil. The Côtes de Bourg are characterized by the diversity and richness of their soils.

Although the Côtes de Bourg is composed of mainly clay and limestone soils, their make-up is so rich that there is a veritable mosaic of sand and gravel in the area around Pugnac. Three types are predominant. Firstly, the Sienna-red Quaternary alluvium that is quite specific to the region and situated more on the heights: Merlot and Malbec are widely cultivated. Merlot and Cabernet are planted on clay and sandy gravel soils while Merlot is also grown on the widespread areas of clay and limestone.

The Atlantic Ocean plays an important role in the temperate climate of le Bourgeais and this accentuates the expression of terroir, aided by the regulation of temperatures by the effects of the Gironde estuary. According to scientists, especially Jean Duteau, the Côtes de Bourg benefits from 10% additional sunlight, 1° to 2° less extreme temperatures and a 10% to 25% lower rainfall depending on the year, in comparison with Bordeaux.

== Gallery ==
Bourg sur Gironde

Bourg mausolee

Bourg Chateau

Bourg vineyard
