= Bourg, Gironde =

Bourg
- Commune
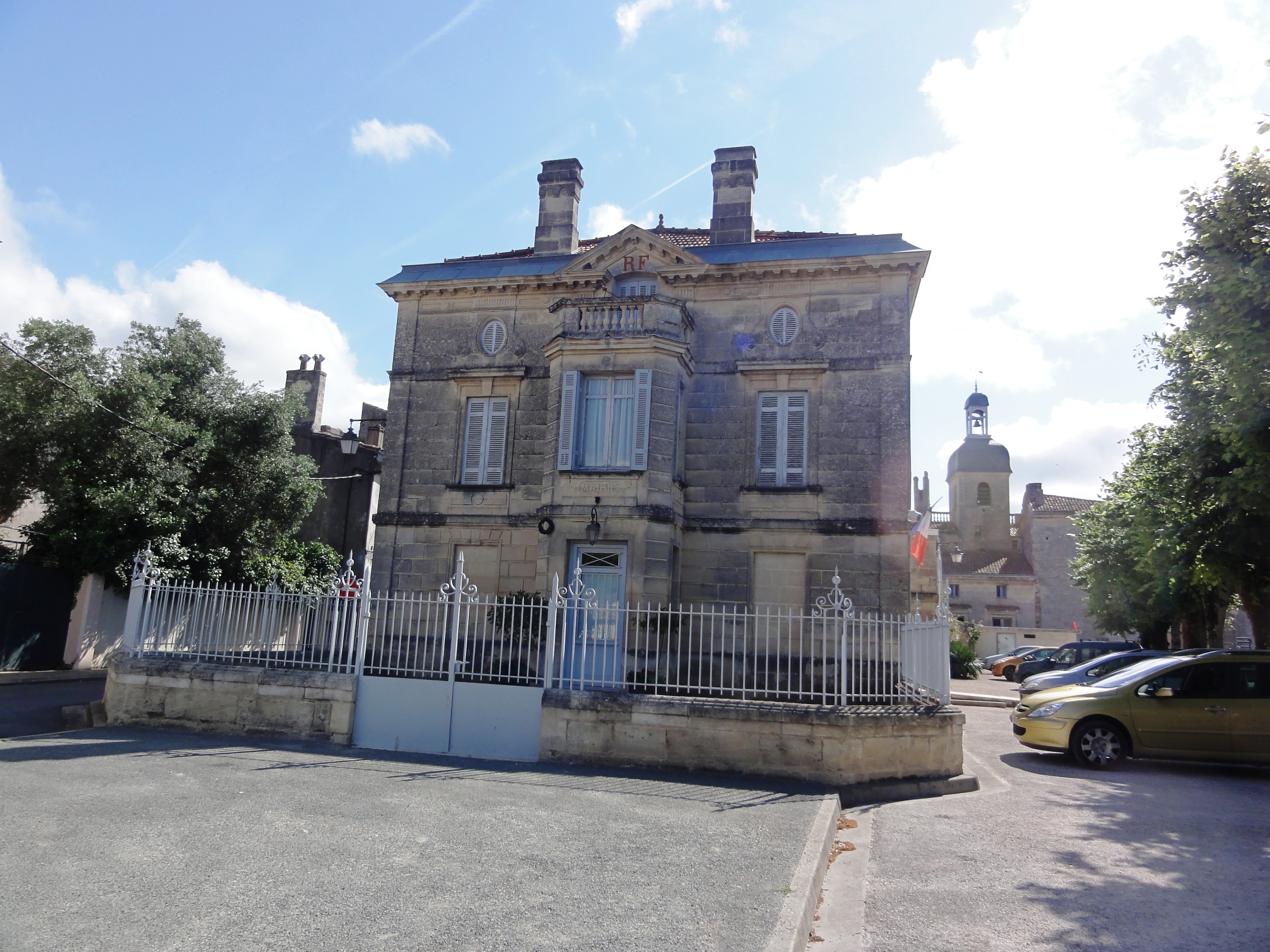
- The town hall in Bourg

- Coat of arms
- Location of Bourg
- Location within France Location within Nouvelle-Aquitaine
- Coordinates: 45°02′27″N 0°33′22″W
- Country: France
- Region: Nouvelle-Aquitaine
- Department: Gironde
- Arrondissement: Blaye
- Canton: L'Estuaire

Government
  - Mayor (2020–2026): Pierre Joly
- Area^{1}: 10.54 km^{2} (4.07 sq mi)
- Elevation: 16 m (52 ft)
- Highest elevation: 81 m (266 ft)
- Lowest elevation: 1 m (3.3 ft)
- Population (2023): 2,244
  - Density: 212.9/km^{2} (551.4/sq mi)
- Time zone: UTC+01:00 (CET)
  - Summer (DST): UTC+02:00 (CEST)
- INSEE/Postal code: 33067 /33710
- ^{1} French Land Register data, which excludes lakes, ponds, glaciers > 1 km^{2} (0.386 sq mi or 247 acres) and river estuaries.

Bourg (French pronunciation: [buʁ]; Occitan: Borg), also informally known as Bourg-sur-Gironde, is a commune in the Gironde department in Nouvelle-Aquitaine in southwestern France. It is part of the Côtes de Bourg wine region. Bourg originated as a fortified villa built by the Roman prefect Pontius Paulinus in the 4th century.

== Population ==
Historical population

Year	Pop.	±% p.a.
1793	3,200	—
1800	2,704	−2.38%
1806	2,534	−1.08%
1821	2,233	−0.84%
1831	2,306	+0.32%
1836	2,466	+1.35%
1841	2,564	+0.78%
1846	2,666	+0.78%
1851	2,694	+0.21%
1856	2,687	−0.05%
1861	2,781	+0.69%
1866	2,810	+0.21%
1872	2,735	−0.45%
1876	2,864	+1.16%
1881	2,771	−0.66%
1886	2,734	−0.27%
1891	2,780	+0.33%
1896	2,890	+0.78%
1901	2,832	−0.40%

Year	Pop.	±% p.a.
1906	2,688	−1.04%
1911	2,555	−1.01%
1921	2,470	−0.34%
1926	2,334	−1.13%
1931	2,306	−0.24%
1936	2,182	−1.10%
1946	2,057	−0.59%
1954	2,199	+0.84%
1962	2,518	+1.71%
1968	2,560	+0.28%
1975	2,318	−1.41%
1982	2,107	−1.35%
1990	2,158	+0.30%
1999	2,115	−0.22%
2007	2,209	+0.55%
2012	2,141	−0.62%
2017	2,243	+0.94%
2023	2,244	+0.01%

Source: EHESS and INSEE (1968-2023)

== See also ==
- Communes of the Gironde department
