= Merlot =

Wine grape variety

- Grape (Vitis)
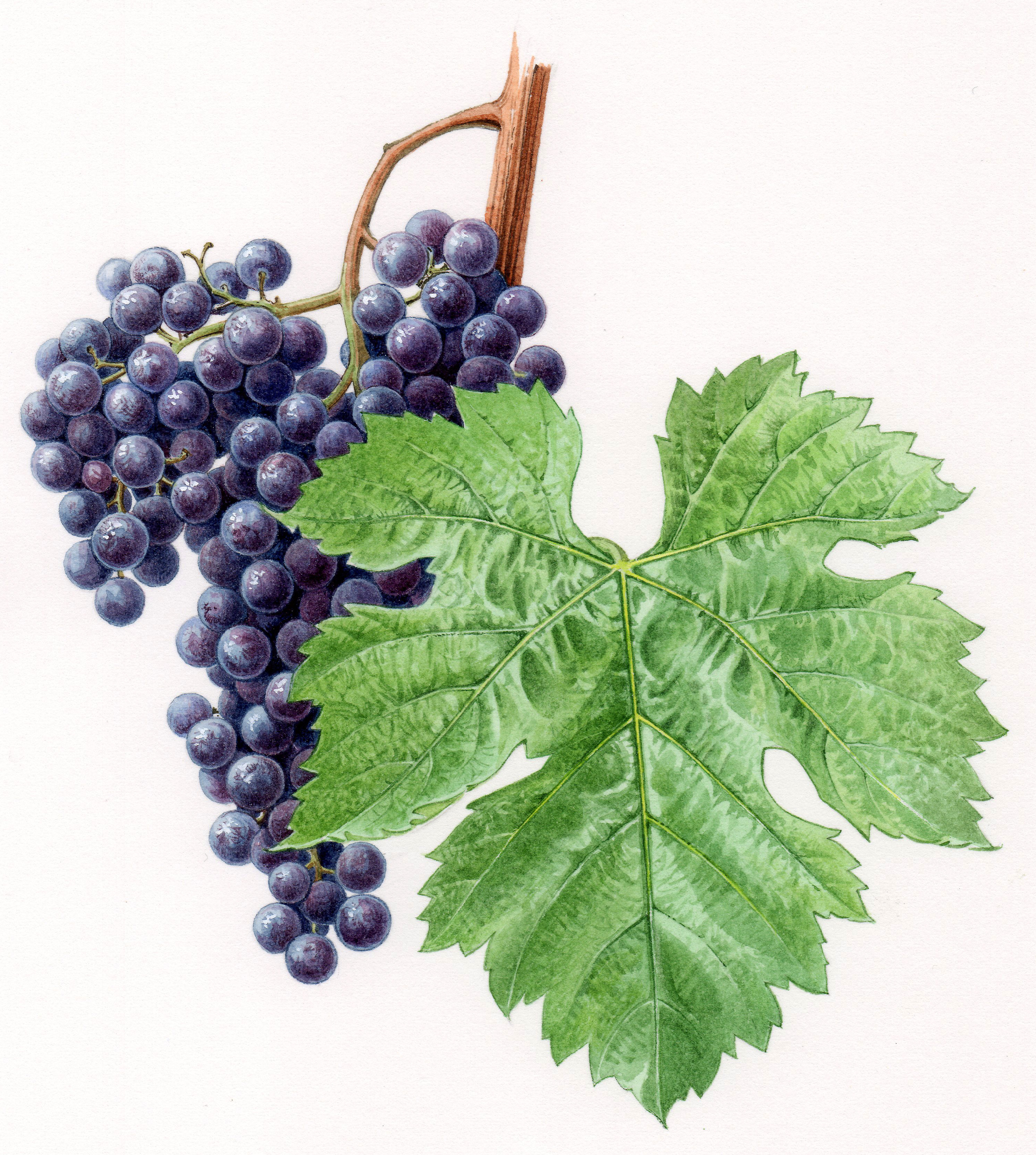
- Merlot grapes on the vine
- Color of berry skin: Black
- Also called: Picard, Langon
- Notable regions: Bordeaux, Long Island, Napa Valley, Sonoma County, Chilean Central Valley, Romania, Australia, and Hungary
- Notable wines: South Africa, Saint-Émilion, Pomerol
- Ideal soil: Clay
- VIVC number: 7657

Wine characteristics
- General: Medium tannins
- Cool climate: Strawberry, red berry, plum, cedar, tobacco
- Medium climate: Blackberry, black plum, black cherry
- Hot climate: Fruitcake, chocolate

Merlot (/ˈmɜːrloʊ/ MUR-loh) is a dark-blue-colored wine grape variety that is used as both a blending grape and for varietal wines. The name Merlot is thought to be a diminutive of merle, the French name for the blackbird, probably a reference to the color of the grape. Its softness and "fleshiness", combined with its earlier ripening, make Merlot a popular grape for blending with the sterner, later-ripening Cabernet Sauvignon, which tends to be higher in tannin.

Along with Cabernet Sauvignon, Cabernet Franc, Malbec, and Petit Verdot, Merlot is one of the primary grapes used in Bordeaux wine, and it is the most widely planted grape in the Bordeaux wine regions. Merlot is also one of the most popular red wine varietals in many markets. This flexibility has helped to make it one of the world's most planted grape varieties. As of 2004, Merlot was estimated to be the third most grown variety at 260,000 hectares (640,000 acres) globally. The area dedicated to Merlot has continued to increase, with 266,000 hectares (660,000 acres) in 2015.

While Merlot is made across the globe, there tend to be two main styles. The "International style" favored by many New World wine regions tends to emphasize late harvesting to gain physiological ripeness and produce inky, purple-colored wines that are full in body with high alcohol and lush, velvety tannins with hints of plum and blackberry. While this international style is practiced by many Bordeaux wine producers, the traditional "Bordeaux-style" of Merlot involves harvesting Merlot earlier. This maintains the acidity and produces more medium-bodied wines with moderate alcohol levels that have fresh, red fruit flavors (raspberries, strawberries) and potentially leafy, vegetal notes.

== History and name ==
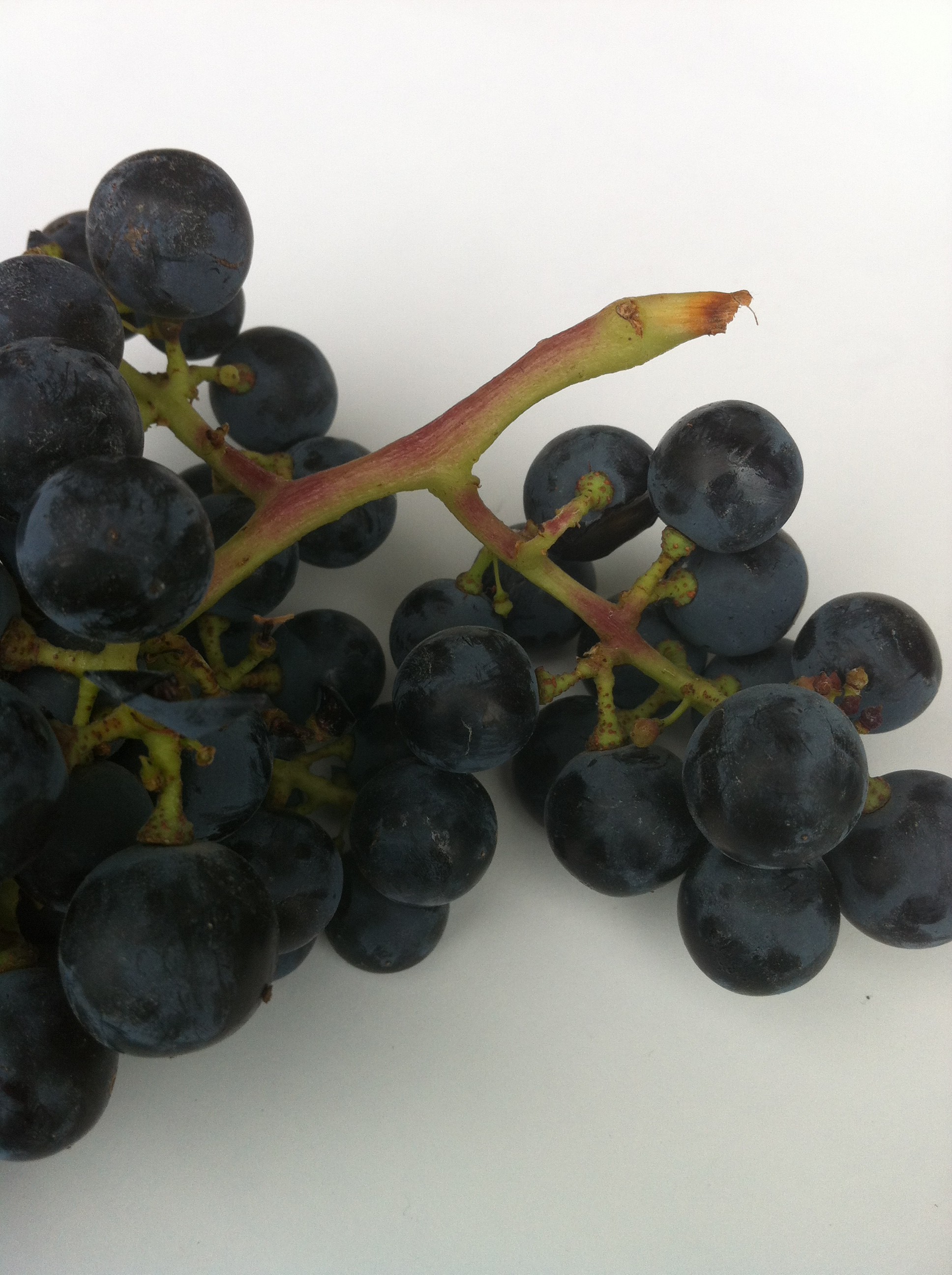
A main cluster and an attached "wing cluster" of Merlot grapes with its characteristic dark-blue color

The earliest recorded mention of Merlot (under the synonym of Merlau) was in the notes of a local Bordeaux official who in 1784 labeled wine made from the grape in the Libournais region as one of the area's best. In 1824, the word Merlot itself appeared in an article on Médoc wine which mentioned that the grape was named after the local black bird (called merlau in the local variant of Occitan language, merle in standard French) who liked eating the ripe grapes on the vine. Other descriptions of the grape from the 19th century called the variety lou seme doù flube (meaning "the seedling from the river") with the grape thought to have originated on one of the islands found along the Garonne river.

By the 19th century it was being regularly planted in the Médoc on the "Left Bank" of the Gironde. After a series of setbacks that included a severe frost in 1956 and several vintages in the 1960s lost to rot, French authorities in Bordeaux banned new plantings of Merlot vines between 1970 and 1975.

It was first recorded in Italy around Venice under the synonym Bordò in 1855. The grape was introduced to the Swiss, from Bordeaux, sometime in the 19th century and was recorded in the Swiss canton of Ticino between 1905 and 1910. In the 1990s, Merlot saw an upswing of popularity in the United States. Red wine consumption, in general, increased in the US following the airing of the 60 Minutes report on the French Paradox and the potential health benefits of wine and, possibly, the chemical resveratrol. The popularity of Merlot stemmed in part from the relative ease in pronouncing the name of the wine as well as its softer, fruity profile that made it more approachable to some wine drinkers.

=== Parentage and relationship to other grapes ===
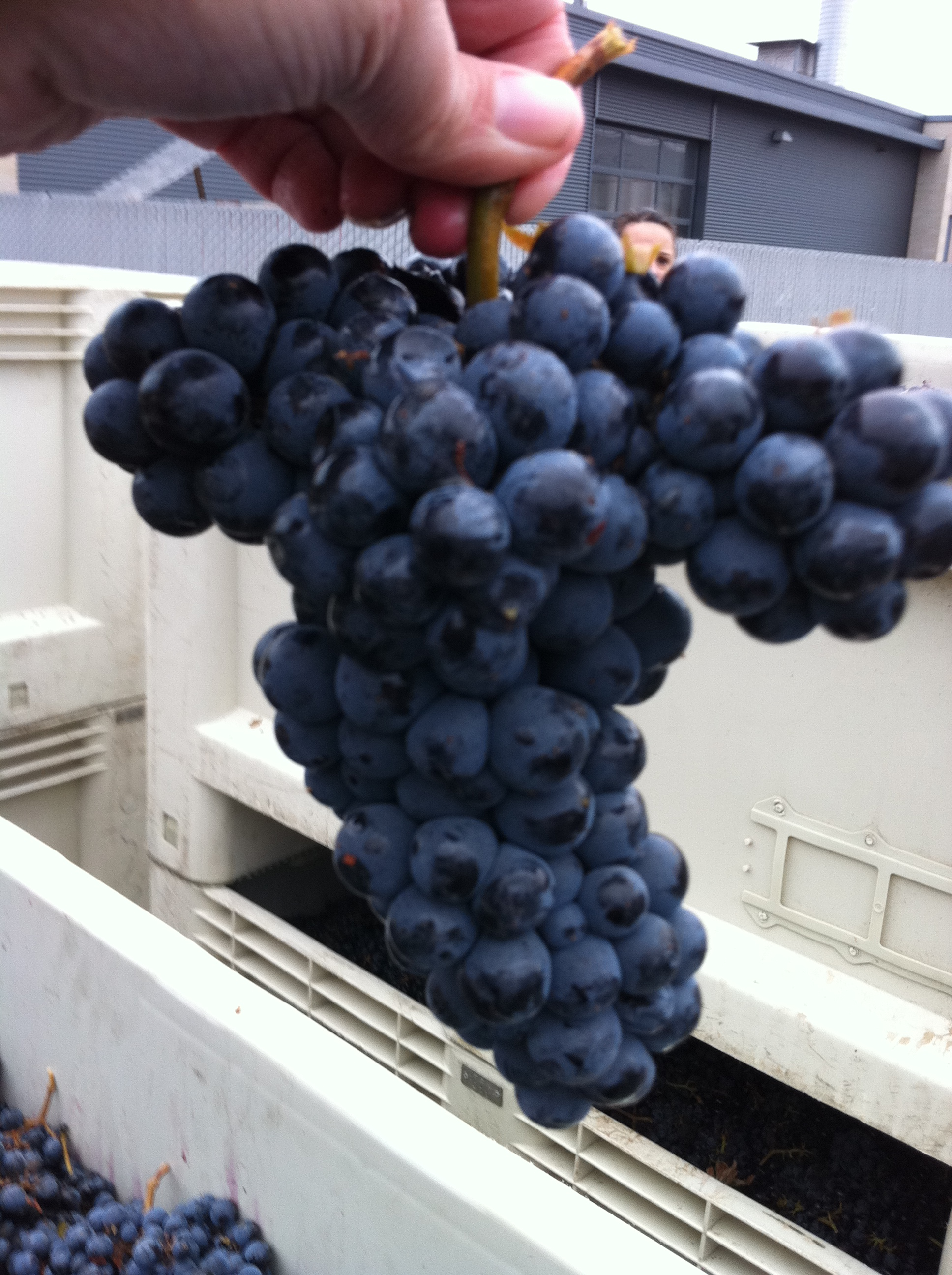
Cabernet Franc, one of the parent varieties of Merlot

In the late 1990s, researchers at the University of California, Davis, showed that Merlot is an offspring of Cabernet Franc and is a half-sibling of Carménère, Malbec, and Cabernet Sauvignon. The identity of the second parent of Merlot wouldn't be discovered till the late 2000s when an obscure and unnamed variety, first sampled in 1996 from vines growing in an abandoned vineyard in Saint-Suliac in Brittany, was shown by DNA analysis to be the mother of Merlot.

This grape, later discovered in front of houses as a decorative vine in the villages of Figers, Mainxe, Saint-Savinien, and Tanzac in the Poitou-Charentes, was colloquially known as Madeleina or Raisin de La Madeleine due to its propensity to be fully ripe and ready for harvest around the July 22nd feast day of Mary Magdalene. As the connection to Merlot became known, the grape was formally registered under the name Magdeleine Noire des Charentes. Through its relationship with Magdeleine Noire des Charentes, Merlot is related to the Southwest France wine grape Abouriou, though the exact nature of that relationship (with Abouriou potentially being either a parent of Magdeleine Noire or an offspring) is not yet known.

Grape breeders have used Merlot crossed with other grapes to create several new varieties including Carmine (an Olmo grape made by crossing a Carignan x Cabernet Sauvignon cross with Merlot), Ederena (with Abouriou), Evmolpia (with Mavrud), Fertilia (with Raboso Veronese), Mamaia (a Romanian wine grape made by crossing a Muscat Ottonel x Babeasca negra cross with Merlot), Nigra (with Barbera), Prodest (with Barbera), and Rebo (with Teroldego).

Over the years, Merlot has spawned a color mutation that is used commercially, a pink-skinned variety known as Merlot gris. However, unlike the relationship between Grenache noir and Grenache blanc or Pinot noir and Pinot blanc, the variety known as Merlot blanc is not a color mutation but rather an offspring variety of Merlot crossing with Folle blanche.

== Viticulture ==
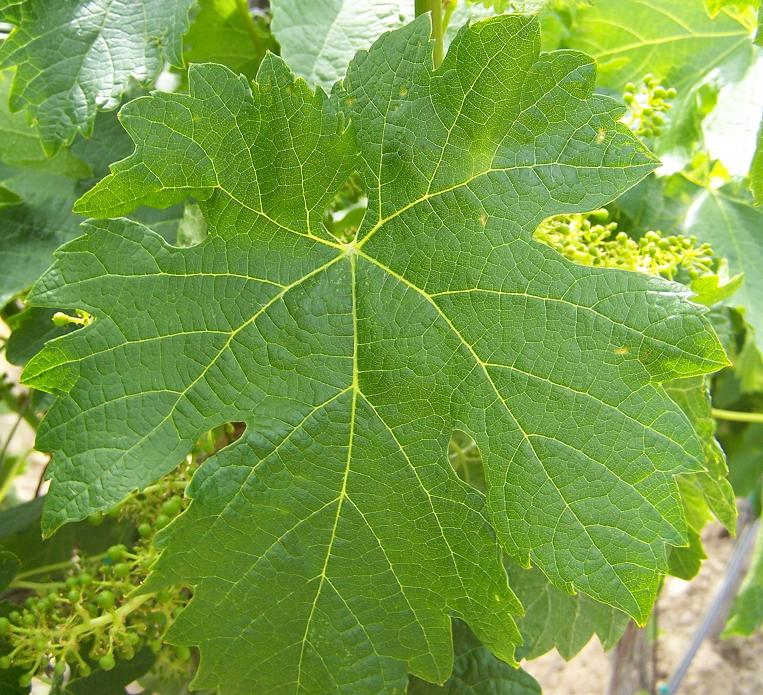
Merlot leaf from Hedges vineyard in the Red Mountain AVA

Merlot grapes are identified by their loose bunches of large berries. The color has less of a blue/black hue than Cabernet Sauvignon grapes and with a thinner skin and fewer tannins per unit volume. It normally ripens up to two weeks earlier than Cabernet Sauvignon. Also compared to Cabernet, Merlot grapes tend to have a higher sugar content and lower malic acid. Ampelographer J.M. Boursiquot has noted that Merlot has seemed to inherit some of the best characteristics from its parent varieties—its fertility and easy ripening ability from Magdeleine Noire des Charentes and its color, tannin and flavor phenolic potential from Cabernet Franc.

Merlot thrives in cold soil, particularly ferrous clay. The vine tends to bud early which gives it some risk to cold frost and its thinner skin increases its susceptibility to the viticultural hazard of Botrytis bunch rot. If bad weather occurs during flowering, the Merlot vine is prone to develop coulure. The vine can also be susceptible to downy mildew (though it has better resistance to powdery mildew than other Bordeaux varieties) and to infection by leafhopper insect varieties.

Water stress is important to the vine with it thriving in well-drained soil more so than at base of a slope. Pruning is a major component to the quality of the wine that is produced with some producers believing it is best to prune the vine "short" (cutting back to only a few buds). Wine consultant Michel Rolland is a major proponent of reducing the yields of Merlot grapes to improve quality. The age of the vine is also important, with older vines contributing character to the resulting wine.

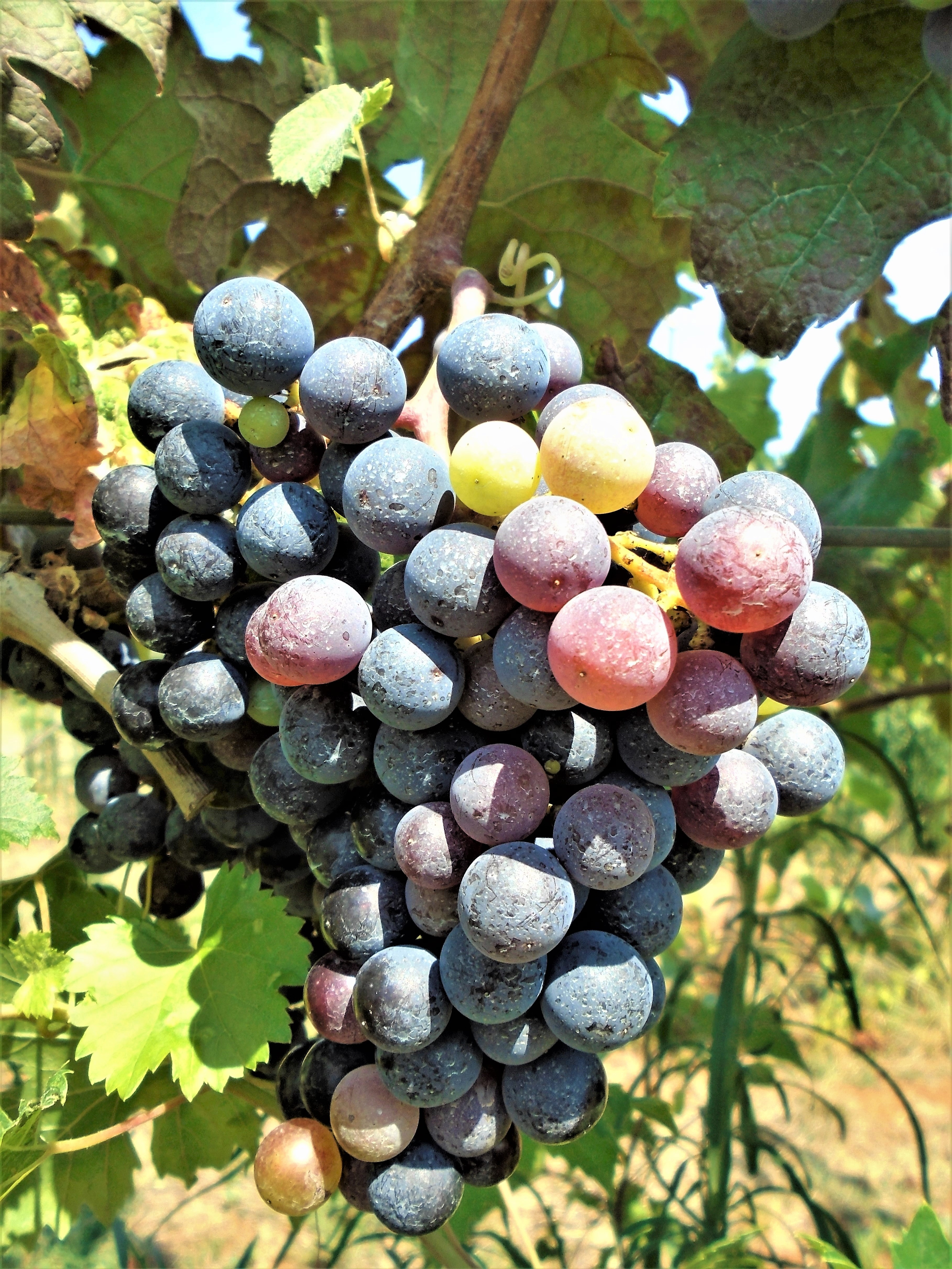
Merlot grape cluster ripening in Istria County, Croatia

A characteristic of the Merlot grape is the propensity to quickly overripen once it hits its initial ripeness level, sometimes in a matter of a few days. There are two schools of thought on the right time to harvest Merlot. The wine makers of Château Pétrus favor early picking to best maintain the wine's acidity and finesse as well as its potential for aging. Others, such as Rolland, favor late picking and the added fruit body that comes with a little bit of over-ripeness.

== Wine regions ==
Merlot is one of the world's most widely planted grape variety with plantings of the vine outpacing even the more well-known Cabernet Sauvignon in many regions, including the grape's homeland of France. Here, France is home to nearly two thirds of the world's total plantings of Merlot. Beyond France it is also grown in Italy (where it is the country's 5th most planted grape), Algeria, California, Romania, Australia, Argentina, Bulgaria, Canada, Chile, Greece, New Zealand, South Africa, Switzerland, Croatia, Hungary, Montenegro, Slovenia, Mexico, and other parts of the United States such as Washington, Virginia, and Long Island. It grows in many regions that also grow Cabernet Sauvignon but tends to be cultivated in the cooler portions of those areas. In areas that are too warm, Merlot will ripen too early.

In places like Israel, Merlot is the second most widely planted grape variety after Cabernet Sauvignon with 1,000 hectares (2,500 acres) in cultivation, making very "New World-style" wines. The grape can also be found in Turkey (429 hectares (1,060 acres) in 2010), Malta, and Cyprus.

=== France ===
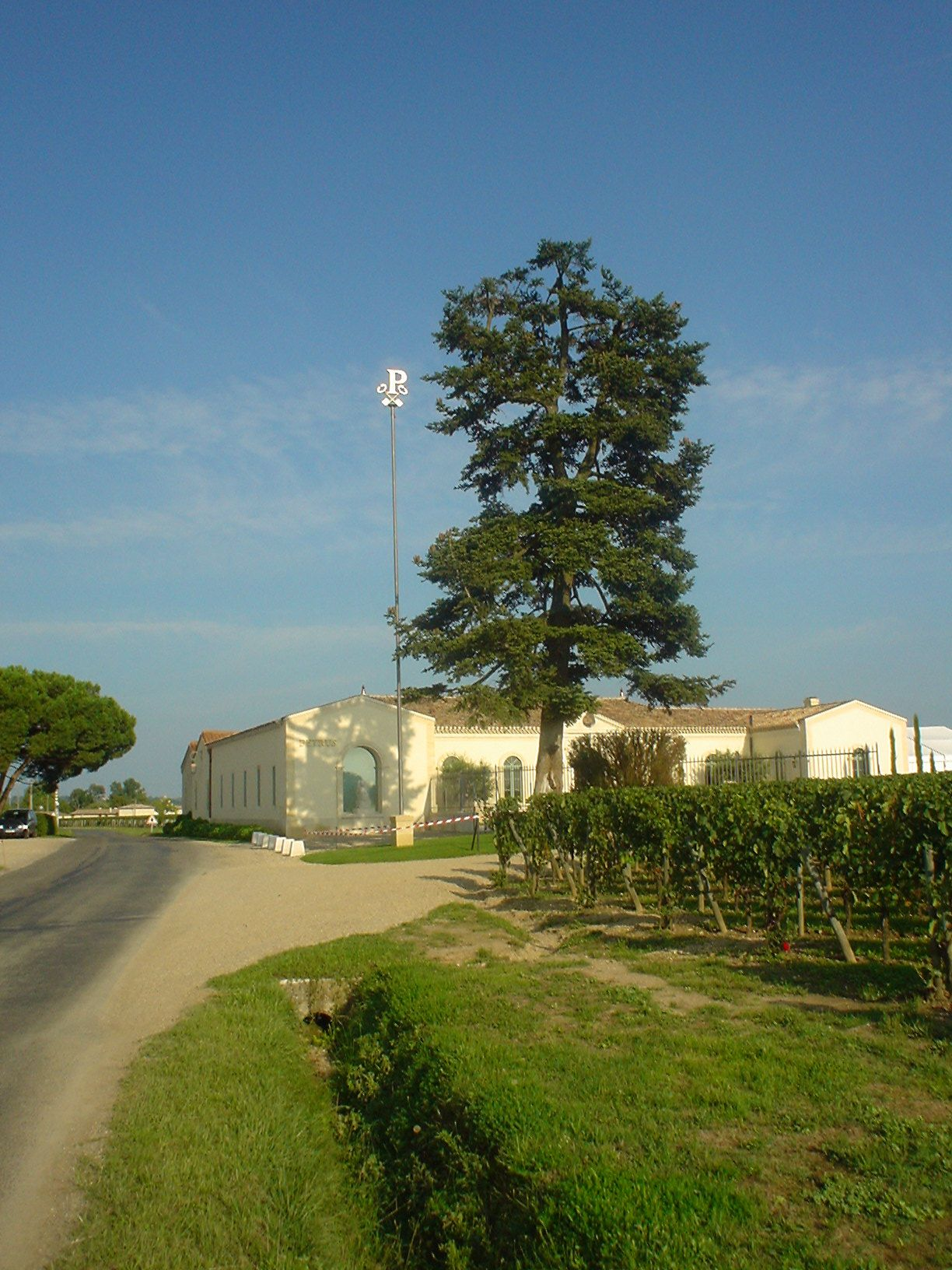
Vineyards and winery exterior of Château Pétrus

Merlot is the most commonly grown grape variety in France. In 2004, total French plantations stood at 115,000 hectares (280,000 acres). By 2017, that number had dropped slightly to 112,000 hectares (280,000 acres). It is most prominent in Southwest France in regions like Bordeaux, Bergerac, and Cahors, where it is often blended with Malbec. The largest recent increase in Merlot plantations has occurred in the south of France, such as Languedoc-Roussillon, where it is often made under the designation of Vin de Pays wine. Here, Merlot accounted for 29,914 hectares (73,920 acres), more than doubling the 11,000 hectares (27,000 acres) devoted to Cabernet Sauvignon in the Languedoc.

In the traditional Bordeaux blend, Merlot's role is to add body and softness. Despite accounting for 50-60% of overall plantings in Bordeaux, the grape tends to account for an average of 25% of the blends—especially in the Bordeaux wine regions of Graves and Médoc. Of these Left Bank regions, the commune of St-Estephe uses the highest percentage of Merlot in the blends. However, Merlot is much more prominent on the Right Bank of the Gironde in the regions of Pomerol and Saint-Émilion, where it will commonly comprise the majority of the blend. One of the most famous and rare wines in the world, Château Pétrus, is almost all Merlot. In Pomerol, where Merlot usually accounts for around 80% of the blend, the iron-clay soils of the region give Merlot more of a tannic backbone than what is found in other Bordeaux regions. It was in Pomerol that the garagistes movement began with small-scale production of highly sought after Merlot-based wines. In the sandy, clay-limestone-based soils of Saint-Émilion, Merlot accounts for around 60% of the blend and is usually blended with Cabernet Franc. In limestone, Merlot tends to develop more perfume notes while in sandy soils the wines are generally softer than Merlot grown in clay dominant soils. Merlot can also be found in significant quantities in Provence, Loire Valley, Savoie, Ardèche, Charente, Corrèze, Drôme, Isère and Vienne.

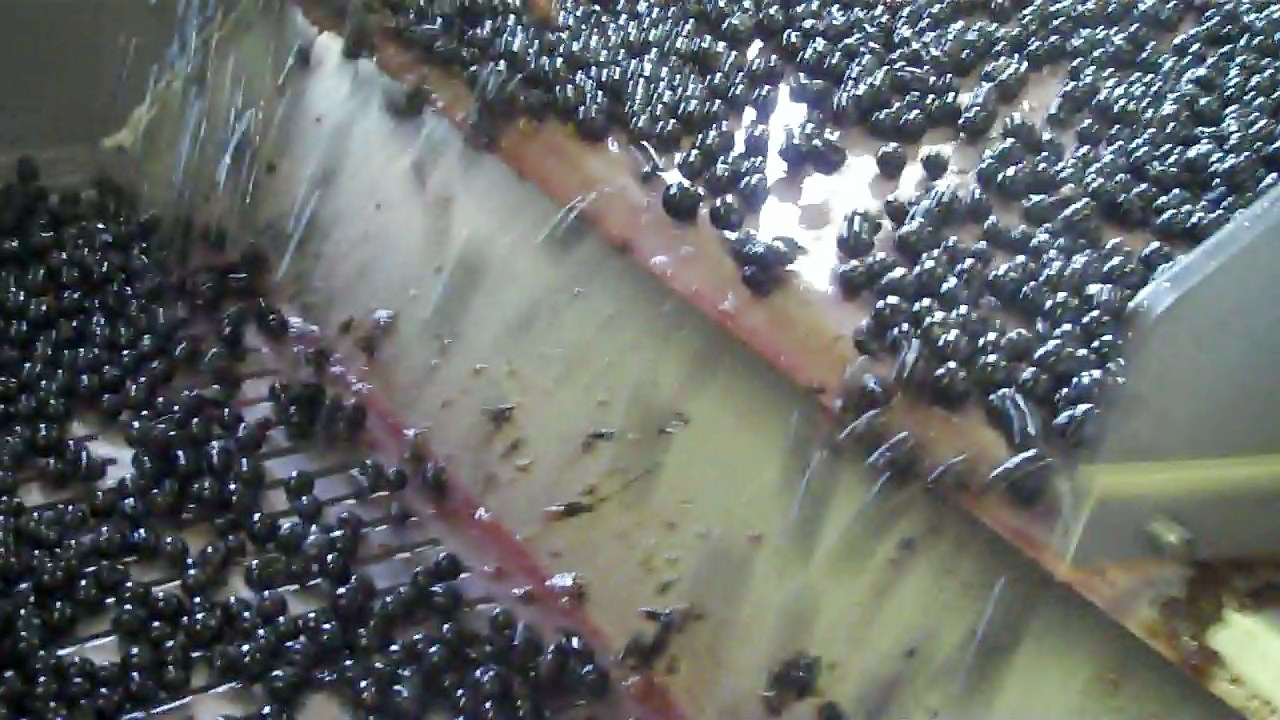
Berries of Merlot being sorted at Chateau Kirwan in a process that removes shot berries and MOG.

=== Italy ===
In Italy, there were 25,614 hectares (63,290 acres) of the grape planted in 2000 with more than two-thirds of Italian Merlot being used in Indicazione geografica tipica (IGT) blends (such as the so-called "Super Tuscans") versus being used in classified Denominazione di origine controllata (DOC) or Denominazione di Origine Controllata e Garantita (DOCG) wines. A large portion of Merlot is planted in the Friuli wine region where it is made as a varietal or sometimes blended with Cabernet Sauvignon or Cabernet Franc. In other parts of Italy, such as the Maremma coast in Tuscany, it is often blended with Sangiovese to give the wine a similar softening effect as the Bordeaux blends.

Italian Merlots are often characterized by their light bodies and herbal notes. Merlot's low acidity serves as a balance for the higher acidity in many Italian wine grapes with the grape often being used in blends in the Veneto, Alto Adige, and Umbria regions. Global warming is potentially having an influence on Italian Merlot as more cooler-climate regions in northern Italy are being able to ripen the grape successfully while other regions already planted are encountering issues with over-ripeness.

According to Master of Wine Jancis Robinson, some of the higher quality Italian Merlots are often from vineyards planted with cuttings sourced from France. Robinson describes the style of Friuli Merlots from regarded estates as having potentially a "Pomerol-quality" to them while Merlots from the warm plains of the Veneto can often be over-ripe with high yields giving them a "sweet and sour" quality. Robinson notes that the Merlots from Trentino-Alto-Adige can fall somewhere between those of Friuli and the Veneto. The Strada del Merlot is a popular tourist route through Italian Merlot regions along the Isonzo river.

=== Spain ===
In the hot continental climate of many of Spain's major wine regions, Merlot is less valued than it is in the damp maritime climate of Bordeaux or the warm Mediterranean climate of the Tuscan coast. But as the popularity of international varieties continue to grow on the world wine market, Spanish wine producers have been experimenting with the variety with even winemakers in Rioja petitioning authorities to allow Merlot to be a permitted grape to be blended with Tempranillo in the red wines of the region.

In 2008, there were 13,325 hectares (32,930 acres) of Merlot, a significant increase from the 8,700 hectares (21,000 acres) that were being cultivated in the country only four years earlier. In 2015, this had dropped slightly to 13,044 hectares (32,230 acres), making Merlot the eighth most planted red grape variety in Spain. The largest concentration of the grape is in the Mediterranean climate of Catalonia and the continental climate of Castilla–La Mancha, with significant plantings also in Navarra and Aragon. In Costers del Segre, the grape is often used in Bordeaux-style blends while in Aragon, Navarra, and Castilla-La Mancha it is sometimes blended with Tempranillo and other local Spanish wine grape varieties.

=== Central Europe ===
In Germany, there were 450 hectares (1,100 acres) of Merlot growing in 2008 with the grape mostly planted in the warmer German wine regions of the Palatinate and Rheinhessen.

In Switzerland, Merlot accounts for nearly 85% of the wine production in Ticino where it is often made in a pale "white Merlot" style. In 2009, there were 1,028 hectares (2,540 acres) plantings of Swiss Merlot.

Plantings of Merlot have increased in recent years in the Austrian wine region of Burgenland where vineyards previously growing Welschriesling are being uprooted to make room for more plantings. The grape still lags behind its parent variety, Cabernet Franc, with 112 hectares (280 acres) in cultivation in 2008. Outside of Burgenland, nearly half of all Austrian Merlot plantings are found in Lower Austria.

=== Rest of Europe ===
In the Eastern European countries of Bulgaria, Moldova, Croatia, and Romania, Merlot is often produced as a full bodied wine that can be very similar to Cabernet Sauvignon. In Bulgaria, plantings of Merlot lag slightly behind Cabernet Sauvignon with 15,202 hectares (37,560 acres) in 2009 while Croatia had 1,105 hectares (2,730 acres). In the Czech Republic, most of the country's 87 hectares (210 acres) were found in Moravia while Moldova had 8,123 hectares (20,070 acres) in 2009.

In Slovenia, Merlot was the most widely planted grape variety of any color in the Vipava Valley in the Slovene Littoral and the second most widely planted variety in the Gorizia Hills located across the Italian border from Friuli. In the Slovene Littoral, collectively, Merlot accounts for around 15% of total vineyard plantings with 1,019 hectares (2,520 acres) of Merlot in cultivation across Slovenia in 2009.

In Hungary, Merlot complements Kékfrankos, Kékoportó, and Kadarka as a component in Bull's Blood. It is also made into varietal wine known as Egri Médoc Noir which is noted for its balanced acid levels and sweet taste. In 2009, there were 1,791 hectares (4,430 acres) of Merlot planted across Hungary. Most of these hectares can be found in the wine regions of Szekszárd and Villány on the warm Pannonian Basin with significant plantings also found in Kunság, Eger, and Balaton.

In Romania, Merlot is the most widely exported red wine grape variety with 10,782 hectares (26,640 acres) in cultivation in 2008. Most of these plantings are found along the Black Sea in Dobruja, further inland in the Muntenia region of Dealu Mare and in the western Romanian wine region of Drăgășani. Here the grape is often made a varietal but is sometimes blended with other international varieties such as Cabernet Sauvignon and with local grape varieties such as Fetească neagră.

In 2009, Ukraine had 2,820 hectares (7,000 acres) of Merlot in cultivation.

Russia had 1,588 hectares (3,920 acres).

Portugal, has only a very limited amount of Merlot compared to the abundance of native Portuguese grape varieties with 556 hectares (1,370 acres) planted in 2010, mostly in the Portuguese wine regions along the Tagus river.

In Greece, Merlot is one of the top six grape varieties planted in the eastern wine regions of Macedonia (86 hectares (210 acres))and Western Thrace (243 hectares (600 acres)). In central Greece, there were 74 hectares (180 acres) of Merlot in cultivation as of 2012.

=== United States ===
Merlot is grown across the United States—as of 2015, it is the fourth most planted wine grape—with California and Washington growing the most. Other regions producing significant quantities of Merlot include New York State with 365 hectares (900 acres) in 2006 with most of it in the maritime climate of the Long Island AVA and multiple regions in Ohio. In Texas, Merlot is the second most widely planted red wine grape after Cabernet Sauvignon with 117 hectares (290 acres). In Virginia, the grape was the most widely planted red variety with 136 hectares (340 acres) in 2010, most of it in the Monticello AVA and Shenandoah Valley AVA, while Oregon had 206 hectares (510 acres) in 2008 with most planted in the Rogue Valley AVA.

==== California ====
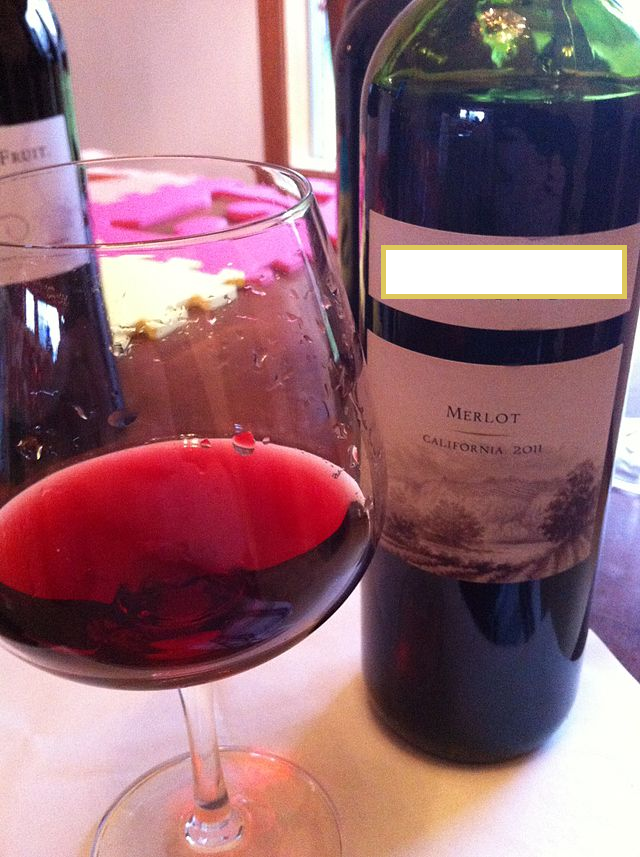
The style of Merlot in California can vary with the grape being found all across the state in both warmer and cooler climate regions. While regional examples of California Merlot exist from places like Napa Valley and Sonoma, many bottles are labeled simply as California Merlot.

In the early history of California wine, Merlot was used primarily as a 100% varietal wine until winemaker Warren Winiarski encouraged taking the grape back to its blending roots with Bordeaux style blends. Others saw its potential as a stand-alone labeled varietal: The first wineries to market Merlot as a varietal in the post WWII period were Louis M. Martini winery, which made a non-vintage dated Merlot, a blend of the 1968 and 1970 vintages, and Sterling Vineyards, which issued the first Merlot with a vintage, 1969 —Sterling's winemaker, Ric Forman, was an early advocate of Merlot as a varietal bottling. Following the "Merlot wine craze" of the 1990s, sparked by 60 Minutes French Paradox report, sales of Merlot spiked, with the grape plantings of over 20,640 hectares (51,000 acres) in 2004. A study published in Wine and Vines magazine indicated that the 2004 movie Sideways, where the lead character is a Pinot noir fan who expresses his disdain of Merlot, caused a decline in Merlot sales in the US after its release (and an even larger spike of interest in Pinot noir). By 2010, plantings of California Merlot had dropped slightly to 18,924 hectares (46,760 acres). Following that dip, Merlot plantings rebounded, totaling approximately 39,000 acres in 2020.

In California, Merlot can range from very fruity simple wines (sometimes referred to by critics as a "red Chardonnay") to more serious, barrel aged examples. It can also be used as a primary component in Meritage blends.

While Merlot is grown throughout the state, it is particularly prominent in Napa, Monterey, and Sonoma County. In Napa, examples from Los Carneros, Mount Veeder, Oakville and Rutherford tend to show ripe blackberry and black raspberry notes. Sonoma Merlots from Alexander Valley, Carneros and Dry Creek Valley tend to show plum, tea leaf, and black cherry notes.

==== Washington State ====
In the 1980s, Merlot helped put the Washington wine industry on the world's wine map. Prior to this period there was a general perception that the climate of Washington State was too cold to produce red wine varietals. Merlots from Leonetti Cellar, Andrew Will, Columbia Crest, and Chateau Ste. Michelle demonstrated that areas of the Eastern Washington were warm enough for red wine production. Today it is the second most widely grown red wine grape in the state (after Cabernet Sauvignon), following many years of being the most widely planted variety, and accounts for nearly one fifth of the state's entire production. In 2011, there were 3,334 hectares (8,240 acres) of Washington Merlot in cultivation.

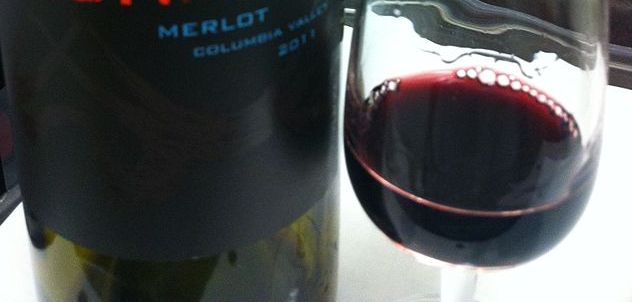
Washington Merlots from the Columbia Valley are often noted for their deep color.

It is widely planted throughout the Columbia Valley AVA but has earned particular notice from plantings grown in Walla Walla, Red Mountain, and the Horse Heaven Hills. Washington Merlots are noted for their deep color and balanced acidity. The state's climate lends itself towards long days and hours of sunshine with cool nights that contributes to a significant diurnal temperature variation and produces wines with New World fruitiness and Old World structure.

=== Canada ===
In Canada, Merlot can be found across the country from the Short Hills Bench of the Niagara Peninsula Ontario, where there were 498 hectares (1,230 acres) of the grape in 2008, to British Columbia, where the grape is the most widely planted wine grape variety of either color at 641 hectares (1,580 acres). Here Merlot accounts for almost a third of all red wine grape plantings and is used for both varietal and Bordeaux-style blends.

=== Mexico ===
In Mexico, Merlot is cultivated primarily in the Valle de Guadalupe of Baja California, the country's main wine-producing area. Plantings have increased substantially since the 1980s, and cultivation has spread into the nearby areas of Ojos Negros and Santo Tomás. The grape can also be found in the north eastern Mexican wine region of Coahuila, across the border from Texas.

=== Chile ===
In Chile, Merlot thrives in the Apalta region of Colchagua Province. It is also grown in significant quantities in Curicó, Casablanca, and the Maipo Valley. Until the early 1990s, the Chilean wine industry mistakenly sold a large quantity of wine made from the Carménère grape as Merlot. Following the discovery that many Chilean vineyards thought to be planted with Sauvignon blanc were actually Sauvignonasse, the owners of the Chilean winery Domaine Paul Bruno (who previously worked with Château Margaux and Château Cos d'Estournel) invited ampelographers to comb through their vineyards to make sure that their wines were properly identified. Genetic studies discovered that much of what had been grown as Merlot was actually Carménère, an old French variety that had gone largely extinct in France due to its poor resistance to phylloxera. While the vines, leaves, and grapes look very similar, both grapes produce wines with distinct characteristics—Carménère being more strongly flavored with green pepper notes and Merlot having softer fruit with chocolate notes.

Today, "true" Merlot is the third most widely planted grape variety in Chile after Cabernet Sauvignon and Listán Prieto with 13,280 hectares (32,800 acres) in 2009. Most of these planting are in the Central Valley, with Colchagua leading the way with 3,359 hectares (8,300 acres), followed by Maule Valley with 3,019 hectares (7,460 acres) and Curicó with 2,911 hectares (7,190 acres).

=== South America ===
In Uruguay, Merlot is often blended with Tannat and is the 2nd most widely planted red grape variety, representing around 10% of total vineyard plantings. More widely planted than Cabernet Sauvignon, there were 853 hectares (2,110 acres) of the grape in cultivation in 2009. Brazil is home to 1,089 hectares (2,690 acres) of Merlot (as of 2007) with most of them in the Rio Grande do Sul region that is across the border with Uruguay. Other South American wine regions growing Merlot include Bolivia with 30 hectares (74 acres) as of 2012 and Peru.

=== Argentina ===
In Argentina, Merlot plantings have been increasing in the Mendoza region with the grape showing an affinity to the Tupungato region of the Uco Valley. Argentine Merlots grown in the higher elevations of Tunpungato have shown a balance of ripe fruit, tannic structure, and acidity. The grape is not as widely planted here due to the natural fruity and fleshiness of the popular Malbec and Douce noir/Bonarda grapes that often don't need to be "mellowed" by Merlot as Cabernet Sauvignon and Cabernet Franc may benefit from. In 2008, there were 7,142 hectares (17,650 acres) of Merlot growing in Argentina, most of it in the Mendoza region and in the San Juan Province.

=== Oceania, South Africa, and Asia ===
In New Zealand, plantings of Merlot have increased in the Hawke's Bay region, particularly in Gimblett Gravels where the grape has shown the ability to produce Bordeaux-style wine. The grape has been growing in favor among New Zealand producers due to its ability to ripen better, with less green flavors, than Cabernet Sauvignon. Other regions with significant plantings include Auckland, Marlborough, and Martinborough. In 2008, Merlot was the second most widely red grape variety (after Pinot noir) in New Zealand and accounted for nearly 5% of all the country's plantings with 1,363 hectares (3,370 acres) in cultivation.

In Australia, some vineyards labeled as "Merlot" were discovered to actually be Cabernet Franc. Merlot vines can also be found growing in the Barossa Valley, McLaren Vale, and Wrattonbully in South Australia. In 2008, it was the third most widely planted red grape variety after Syrah and Cabernet Sauvignon with 10,537 hectares (26,040 acres). As in California, the global "Merlot craze" spurred an increase of plantings, most of it in the warm, irrigated regions of Murray Darling, Riverina, and Riverland, where the grape variety could be mass-produced. Recent plantings, such as those in the Margaret River area of Western Australia have been focusing on making more Bordeaux-style blends.

In South Africa, plantings of Merlot have focused on cooler sites within the Paarl and Stellenbosch regions. Here the grape is the third most widely planted red grape variety, accounting for nearly 15% of all red wine grape plantings, with 6,614 hectares (16,340 acres) of Merlot in cultivation in 2008. The majority of these plantings are found in the Stellenbosch region with 2,105 hectares (5,200 acres) and Paarl with 1,289 hectares (3,190 acres). According to wine expert Jancis Robinson, South African Merlot tend to be made as a varietal in a "chocolately, glossy California style".

In Asia, Merlot is planted in emerging wine regions in India. It can also be found in Japan with 816 hectares (2,020 acres) in 2009 and in China with 3,204 hectares (7,920 acres).

== Wines ==
As a varietal wine, Merlot can make soft, velvety wines with plum flavors. While Merlot wines tend to mature faster than Cabernet Sauvignon, some examples can continue to develop in the bottle for decades. There are three main styles of Merlot—a soft, fruity, smooth wine with very little tannins; a fruity wine with more tannic structure; and, finally, a brawny, highly tannic style made in the profile of Cabernet Sauvignon. Some of the fruit notes commonly associated with Merlot include cassis, black and red cherries, blackberry, blueberry, boysenberry, mulberry, ollalieberry, and plum. Vegetable and earthy notes include black and green olives, cola nut, bell pepper, fennel, humus, leather, mushrooms, rhubarb, and tobacco. Floral and herbal notes commonly associated with Merlot include green and black tea, eucalyptus, laurel, mint, oregano, pine, rosemary, sage, sarsaparilla, and thyme. When Merlot has spent significant time in oak, the wine may show notes of caramel, chocolate, coconut, coffee bean, dill weed, mocha, molasses, smoke, vanilla, and walnut.

=== White Merlot ===
White Merlot is made the same way as White Zinfandel. The grapes are crushed, and after very brief skin contact, the resulting pink juice is run off the must and is then fermented. It normally has a hint of raspberry. White Merlot was reputedly first marketed in the late 1990s. In Switzerland, a type of White Merlot is made in the Ticino region but has been considered more a rosé.

White Merlot should not be confused with the grape variety Merlot blanc, which is a cross between Merlot and Folle blanche that was discovered in 1891, nor should it be confused with the white mutant variety of the Merlot grape.

== Recognition ==
International Merlot Day is observed annually on 7 November and has been referenced in wine media coverage.

== Food pairing ==
In food and wine pairings, the diversity of Merlot can lend itself to a wide array of matching options. Cabernet-like Merlots pair well with many of the same things that Cabernet Sauvignon would pair well with, such as grilled and charred meats. Softer, fruitier Merlots (particularly those with higher acidity from cooler climate regions like Washington State and Northeastern Italy) share many of the same food-pairing affinities with Pinot noir and go well with dishes like salmon, mushroom-based dishes, and greens like chard and radicchio. Light-bodied Merlots can go well with shellfish like prawns or scallops, especially if wrapped in a protein-rich food such as bacon or prosciutto. Merlot tends not to go well with strong and blue-veined cheeses that can overwhelm the fruit flavors of the wine. The capsaicins of spicy foods can accentuate the perception of alcohol in Merlot and make it taste more tannic and bitter.

== In popular culture ==
- Merlot was mocked by the main character in the film Sideways who prefers to drink Pinot Noir instead, which may have played a role in a concurrent slowing of Merlot sales.

== Synonyms ==
Over the years, Merlot has been known under many synonyms across the globe, including Bégney, Bidal, Bidalhe, Bigney, Bigney rouge, Bini, Bini Ruzh, Bioney, Bordeleza belcha, Crabutet, Crabutet noir, Crabutet noir merlau, Hebigney, Higney, Higney rouge, Langon, Lecchumskij, Médoc noir, Merlau, Merlaut, Merlaut noir, Merle, Merle Petite, Merleau, Merlô, Merlot noir, Merlot black, Merlot blauer, Merlot crni, Merlot nero, Merlott, Merlou, Odzalesi, Odzhaleshi, Odzhaleshi Legkhumskii, Petit Merle, Picard, Pikard, Plan medre, Planet Medok, Plant du Médoc, Plant Médoc, Saint-Macaire, Same de la Canan, Same dou Flaube, Sème de la Canau, Sème Dou Flube, Semilhon rouge, Semilhoum rouge, Semilhoun rouge, Sémillon rouge, Sud des Graves, Vidal, Vini Ticinesi, Vitrai, and Vitraille.

== See also ==
- International variety
