= Răducăneni =

- Commune
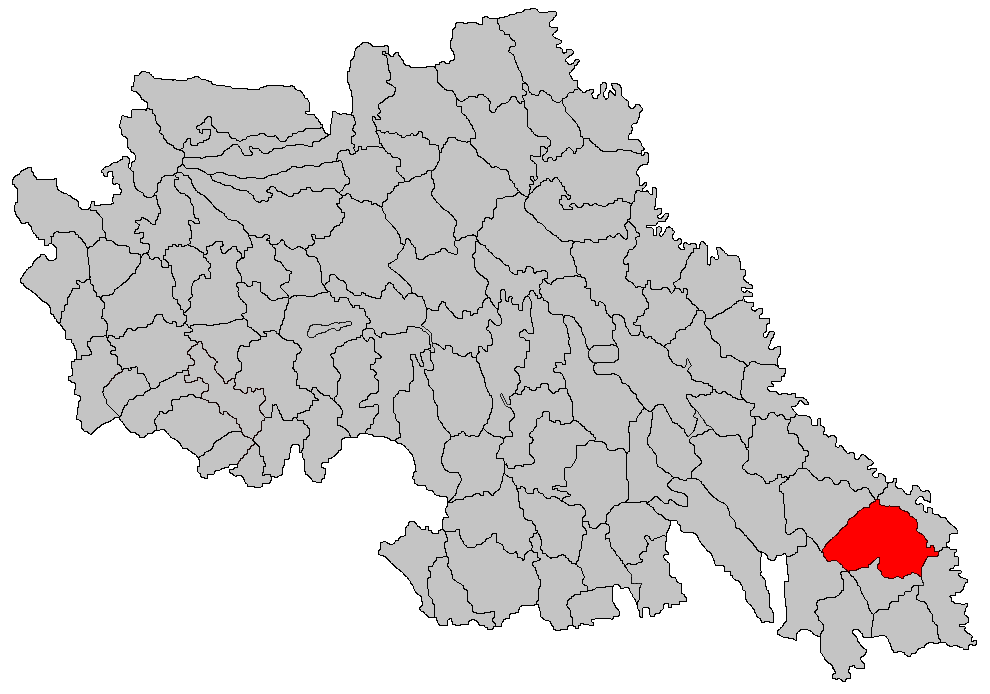
- Location in Iași County

- Location in Romania
- Coordinates: 46°57′N 27°56′E
- Country: Romania
- County: Iași
- Subdivisions: Răducăneni, Bohotin, Isaiia, Roșu

Government
  - Mayor (2024–2028): Răducu-Ionuț Balint (PSD)
- Area: 87.49 km^{2} (33.78 sq mi)
- Elevation: 110 m (360 ft)
- Population (2021-12-01): 6,573
  - Density: 75/km^{2} (190/sq mi)
- Time zone: EET/EEST (UTC+2/+3)
- Postal code: 707400
- Area code: +40 x32
- Vehicle reg.: IS
- Website: comunaraducaneni.ro

Răducăneni is a commune in Iași County, Western Moldavia, Romania. It is composed of four villages: Bohotin, Isaiia, Răducăneni and Roșu.

== See also ==
- Busuioacă de Bohotin
