= Apalta =

Village in O'Higgins Region, Chile

Apalta is a Chilean village, located northeast of Santa Cruz, Colchagua Province, O'Higgins Region.
