= Busuioacă de Bohotin =

Variety of grape

- Grape (Vitis)
- Color of berry skin: Rouge
- Origin: Romania
- Notable regions: Iași County
- VIVC number: 8248

Busuioacă de Bohotin (Romanian pronunciation: [busuˈjo̯akə de bohoˈtin]) is a grape which originates from the Bohotin region, in southeast Iași County, Romania, and is also cultivated in other small areas: Huși in Vaslui County, Pietroasele in Buzău County, and Tohani in Prahova County, on a total area of no more than 100 hectares (250 acres).

The wine has a light red color. Its flavor resembles honeysuckle and ripe juicy peaches. The sweet taste sometimes has a barely perceptible almond-like bitter aroma caused by the latent cyanide moiety.

== Description ==
Busuioaca is a liqueur wine with a special body, with an unmistakable fragrance, a mixture of rose and basil giving it a special note, rarely found in other aromatic wines. Its aroma is unique, bringing honeysuckle and ripe peach, succulent, with the perfect harmony of sugar, alcohol and acidity. Sweet tasting, it sometimes has a bitter taste of almonds.

The Busuioaca de Bohotin variety is grown in four viticultural centers: Bohotin, Iași County, Huși, Vaslui County, Pietroasele, Buzău County, and Tohani, Prahova County. The cultivar is grown on a total of about 100 hectares, which makes the national production of authentic wine of Busuioaca de Bohotin very scarce.

== See also ==
- Romanian wine
