= Grasă de Cotnari =

Wine

- Grape (Vitis)
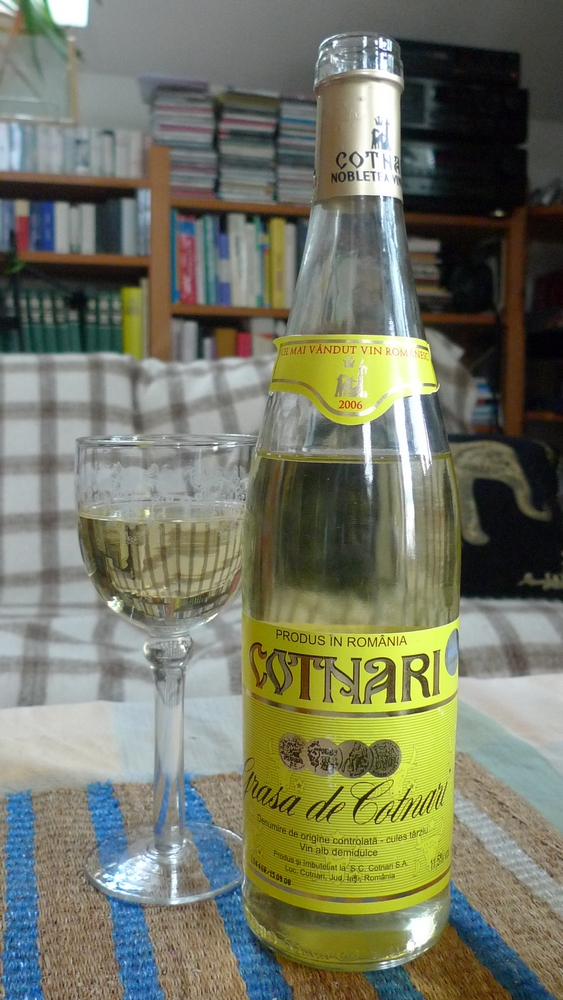
- Semi-sweet Grasă de Cotnari
- Color of berry skin: Blanc
- Species: Vitis vinifera
- Origin: Romania
- Notable regions: Romania
- VIVC number: 4948

Grasă de Cotnari (Romanian pronunciation: [ˈɡrasə de kotˈnarʲ]) is a Romanian wine variety associated with the Cotnari wine region, in Iași County (historical region of Moldavia), where it has been grown ever since the rule of Prince Stephen the Great (1457–1504).

The grape is characterized by its relatively large berries.

== Wine styles ==
Grasă de Cotnari is usually a botrytised sweet wine (although semi-sweet varieties are also made) and usually has a high residual sugar content, sometimes as much as 300g/litre. The harvest of 1958 reached the maximal sugar content in the history of this wine of about 520g/litre.

With the general decline in demand for sweet wines after the Second World War and poor-quality wine making during the communist era, mainly produced for the Soviet Union, Grasă de Cotnari became largely forgotten in the international wine market. Even today it is seldom available, although the offered qualities have improved considerably.

The wine is made primarily from a grape variety also called Grasă de Cotnari. or Grasă (an old white grape cultivar in the Furmint group), although some additional Fetească albă is allowed. It is produced from grapes that fully reached and exceeded their maturity, hence the high residual sugar content. It is suitable for making aszú wines in Hungary where it is called Kövérszőlő.

A carefully-made Grasă de Cotnari is a golden-yellow wine, and in spite of its residual sweetness should retain a fine acid structure and 11,5–14% alcohol by volume. It ages well, its colour darkens from pale yellow to reach a dark yellow with an orange note. A good Grasă de Cotnari should have a distinct bouquet of apricot, walnut and almond and should be drunk chilled at about 10–12°C.

== Relationship to other grapes ==
The grape variety Grasă is known as Kövérszőlő (Hungarian: fat grape) in Tokaj, Hungary. These two grape varieties are identical.
