= Târnave wine region =

The Târnave wine region (also called Tîrnave) in Transylvania, Romania is situated just north of Sibiu, surrounded by the Carpathian Mountains, centered on Jidvei Commune, Alba County. It is one of the most important and oldest wine regions in Romania, being mentioned by Herodotus about 600 BC.

This region has a cool climate due to its altitude (about 300 meters above sea level) and high humidity provided by the nearby Little and Big Târnava rivers. As a result, cool, fruity white wines with very good acidity are produced here.

== Range of wines ==
White wines:

- Pinot Gris
- Italian Riesling
- Sauvignon
- Furmint
- Chardonnay
- Fetească Alba
- Muscat Ottonel

Sparkling wines

- Royal Fetească
- Italian Riesling
- White Fetească

== Vine producers ==
Wineries: Villa Vinèa, Blaj, Jidvei (the largest, see the map), Medias, Târnaveni, Zagar, Valea Nirajului.

== See also ==
- Romanian wine
