= Tămâioasă românească =

Variety of grape

Tămâioasă românească (Romanian pronunciation: [təmɨˈjo̯asə romɨˈne̯askə]) (Romanian Muscatel) is a Romanian grape variety used for the production of aromatic wines, Tămâioasă are natural sweet or semi-sweet wines, with alcohol content of 12%-12.5%. In Moldova, is known as Busuioacă albă.

The golden-yellow wine has a pronounced honey-like flowery bouquet. Because of its natural sweetness it is usually consumed as a dessert wine.
