= Fetească regală =

Variety of grape

- Grape (Vitis)
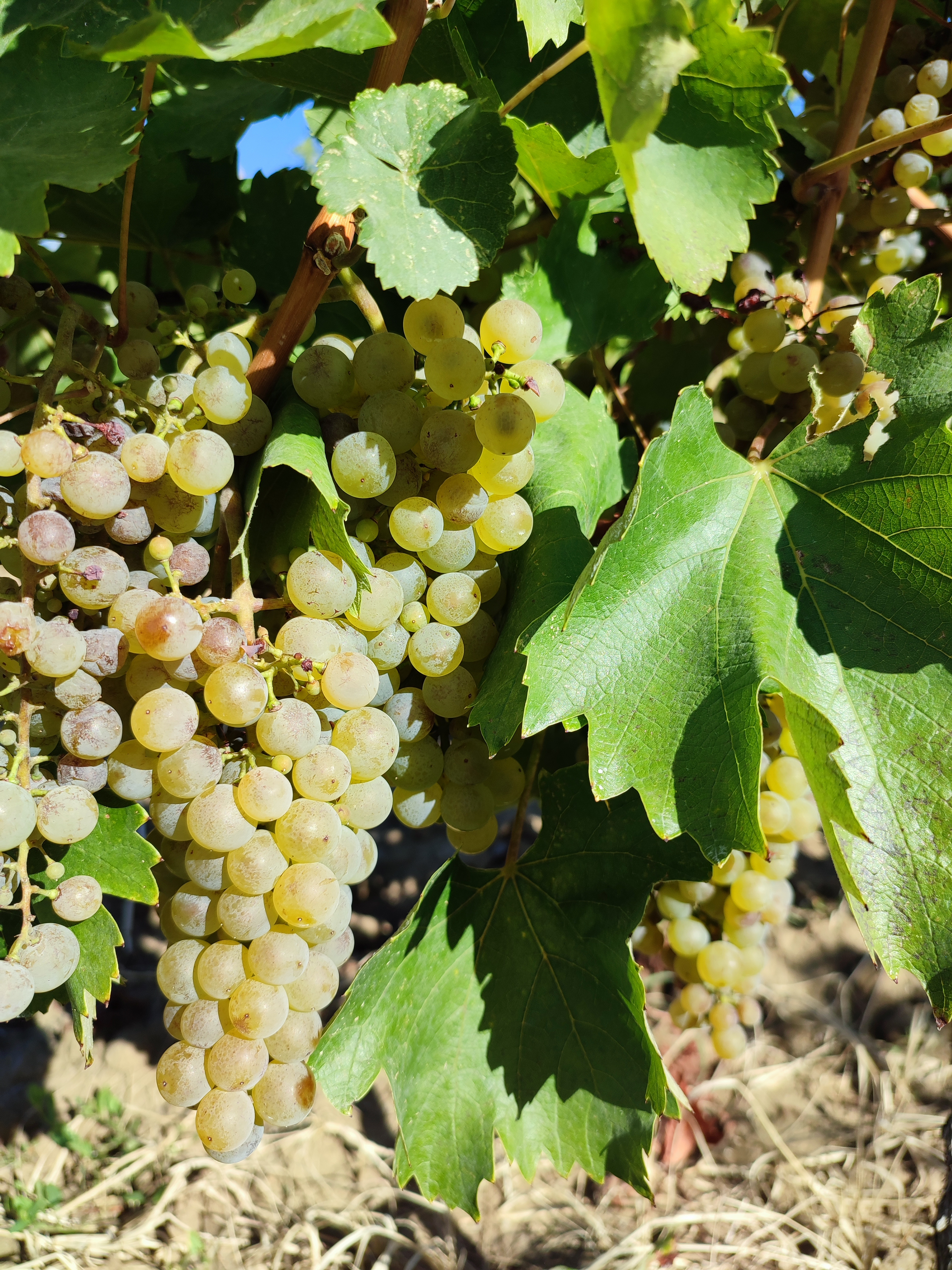
- Color of berry skin: Blanc
- Species: Vitis vinifera
- Also called: See list of synonyms
- Origin: Romania
- Original pedigree: Grasă × Fetească albă
- Pedigree parent 1: Grasă
- Pedigree parent 2: Fetească albă
- Breeding institute: National Institute for Grape and Wine of Romania
- Sex of flowers: Hermaphrodite
- VIVC number: 4121

Fetească regală (Romanian pronunciation: [feˈte̯askə reˈɡalə]) is a white grape variety, which was identified around 1920 in Daneș, Mureș County, Romania. It is a natural crossing of Grasă and Fetească albă.

This variety is cultivated mainly in Romania (Transylvania, Western Moldavia), as well as in Moldova, Slovakia, Hungary and Austria.

The quality of wines ranges between table wine and high-quality ones. The wines are dry and fresh and have acidity and specific flavour.

== Synonyms ==
Fetească regală is also known under the synonyms Danasana, Danesana, Danosi, Danosi Leányka, Dunesdorfer Königsast, Dunesdörfer Königsast, Dunnesdiorfer, Erdei Sárga, Fetească Corolevscaia, Fetească de Daneș, Fetească Korolevskaia, Fetească Muscatnaia, Fetească Muskatnaia, Fetească Regola, Galbenă de Ardeal, Galbena di Ardeal, Kenigrast, Kiraileanka, Királyleányka, Königliche Mädchentraube, Königsast, Königstochter, Konigsast, Královská Leánka, Pesecká Leánka.

== See also ==
- Fetească (disambiguation)
- Romanian wine
