= Fetească albă =

Variety of grape

Fetească Albă
- Grape (Vitis)
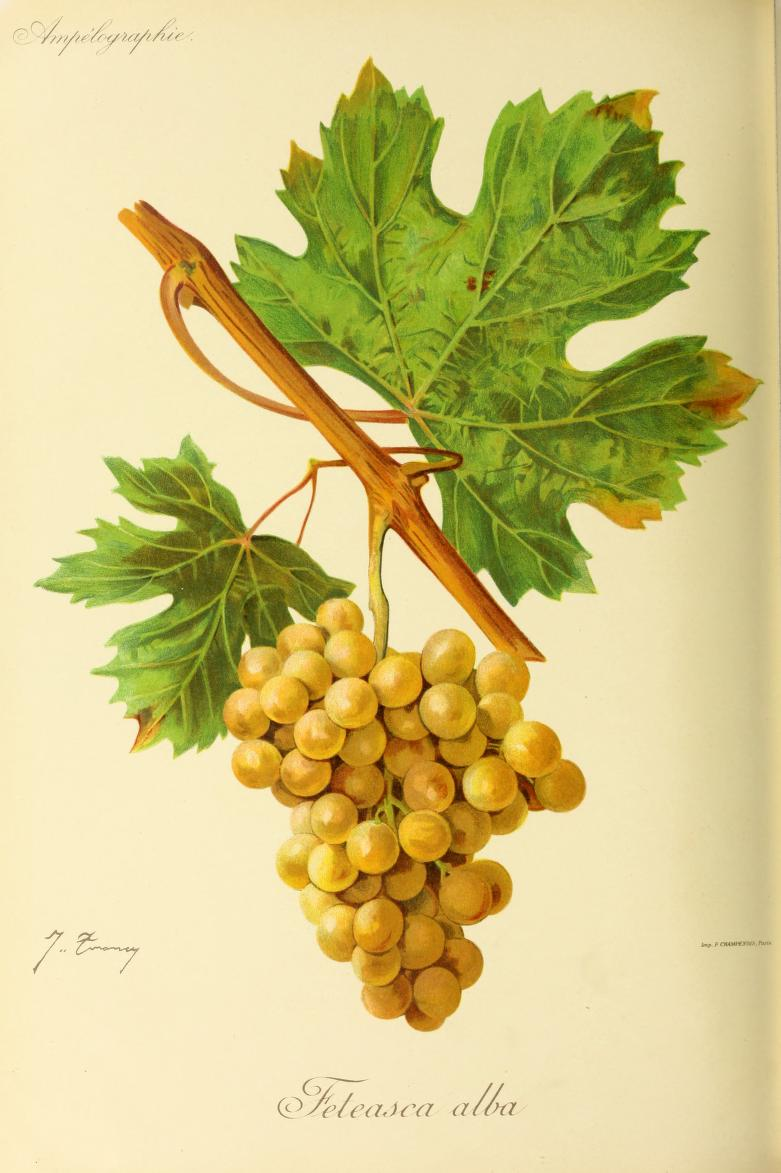
- Color of berry skin: Blanc
- Species: Vitis vinifera
- Also called: Păsărească, Vărătic, Leányka (in Hungary), Mädchentraube (in Germany)
- Origin: Romania
- Sex of flowers: Hermaphrodite
- VIVC number: 4119

Fetească Albă (Romanian pronunciation: [feˈte̯askə ˈalbə]) is a Romanian white grape variety, mainly cultivated in the regions of Moldova and Transylvania in Romania and Republic of Moldova, as well as in the Hungarian wine region of Eger.

In Moldova, it uses the biggest area planted among local varieties – 900 hectares (2,200 acres). This grape is used a lot for sparkling wine production, but also for varietal Fetească wine.

== Synonyms ==
Fetească Albă is also known under the synonyms Baratik, Bulgarien Feteasca, Devcenco Hrozno, Devicii Belii, Dievcenske Hrozno, Dievcie Hrozno, Divci Hrozen, Fehér Leányka, Feniaska Belaii, Fetiască Albă, Fetiasca Belii, Fetiaska Alba, Fetișoară, Fetjaska Belaja, Fetyaska, Fetyaska Belaya, Fetyaska Koroleva, Fetysare, Janyszölde, Jányszőlő, Kanigl Weiss, Lányszőlő, Leanicazea, Leanika, Leánka, Leány Szőlő, Leányka, Leanyszölde, Leányszőlő, Lyan Szölö, Mädchentraube, Medhentraube, Paparyaska, Parsaryaska, Păsărească Albă, Pasarjaska, Peseryaska, Poama Fetei, Poama Fetei Albă, Poama Păsărească, Roszas Leányka, Fetească, Fetjaska, Leanyka, Varatik.

== See also ==
- Fetească neagră
- Fetească regală
