= Fetească neagră =

Romanian Moldovan grape

Fetească Neagră
- Grape (Vitis)
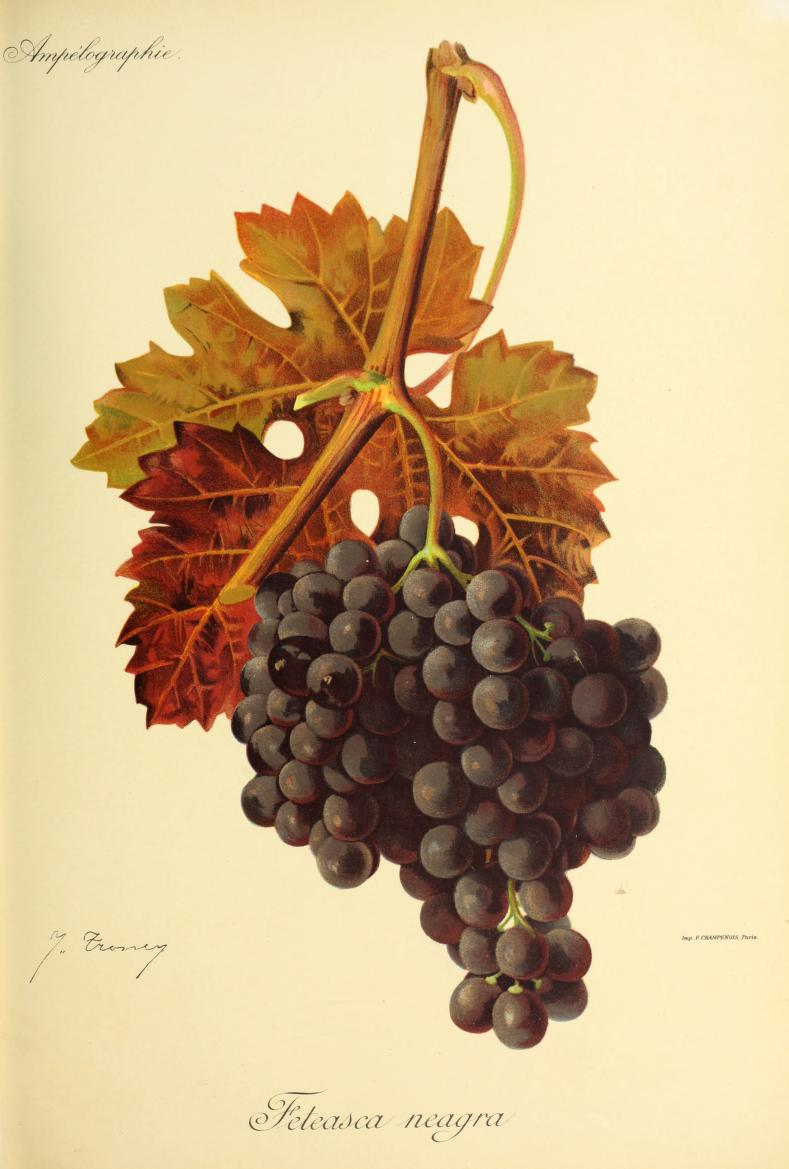
- Color of berry skin: Black
- Species: Vitis vinifera
- Also called: Coada Rândunicii, Coada Rîndunicei, Coada Rîndunicii, Păsărească Neagră, Poama Fetei Neagră (rom.), Chornaya Fetyaska (russ.), Fekete Leányka (hungarian), Mädchentraube Schwarz, Schwarze Mädchentraube (germ.)
- Origin: Moldavia Region - both Moldova and Romania
- Notable regions: Moldavia, Muntenia, Oltenia, Northern Dobruja, Banat
- Sex of flowers: Hermaphrodite
- VIVC number: 4120

Fetească Neagră (Romanian pronunciation: [feˈte̯askə ˈne̯aɡrə]); English: Black Maiden) is an old pre-phylloxeric variety of Romanian grape, cultivated mainly in several areas in the Romanian regions of Moldavia, Muntenia, Oltenia, Banat, Northern Dobruja and also in the Republic of Moldova.

Feteasca Neagra largely disappeared from its Moldovan home during the Soviet era, though it continued to be cultivated in Romania with focus remaining in the east of the country. It is not commercially planted outside of eastern Europe, although a modern trend toward more obscure grape varieties may see this change in coming years, especially as the grape is considered to be of some quality.

Feteasca Neagra is an attractive prospect to winegrowers, as it is resistant to both cold temperatures and drought conditions. It ripens late and has thick skins, leading to wines with an excellent concentration of anthocyanins, giving good pigment to the wines. Nowadays, Feteasca Neagra is usually produced as a varietal wine, although in the past it was often blended with Cabernet Sauvignon and Merlot to give it more body and weight.

These grapes produce dry, demi-dry or sweet wines, with an alcohol content of 12-14%, a deep red colour with ruby shades, and a black currant flavour, which becomes richer and smoother with aging.

== See also ==
- Fetească (disambiguation)
