= List of wineries in South Africa =

This is a list of wineries in South Africa arranged by wine region. A winery is a building or property that produces wine, or a business involved in the production of wine, such as a wine company. Some wine companies own many wineries. Besides wine making equipment, larger wineries may also feature warehouses, bottling lines, laboratories, and large expanses of tanks known as tank farms.

- Wine producing regions in South Africa include*: Barrydale, Breedekloof, Breede River Valley, Cape Point, Calitzdorp, Constantia, Darling, Durbanville, Elgin, Elim, Franschhoek, Ladismith, Little Karoo, Montagu, Orange River Valley, Oudtshoorn, Paarl, Robertson, Stellenbosch, Swartland, Swellendam, Tulbagh, Tygerberg, Wellington and Worcester, and Mosselbay.

== List of wineries in Calitzdorp ==
Name	Coordinates	Remarks
Axe Hill Winery	33°30′58″S 21°41′22″E	
Boplaas Winery and Distillery	33°32′07″S 21°41′01″E	
Calitzdorp Wine Cellar	33°32′17″S 21°41′10″E	
De Krans Wines	33°32′24″S 21°41′03″E	

|Duswaroo |TTT Things take time

== List of wineries in Constantia and Cape Point ==
Name	Coordinates	Remarks
Ambeloui	34.033434°S 18.366283°E	
Beau Constantia		
Buitenverwachting	34°2′30.4″S 18°25′1.5″E	
Cape Point Vineyards	34.09587°S 18.38538°E	
Constantia Glen	34.0151°S 18.4149°E	
Constantia Uitsig	34°2′38″S 18°25′21″E	
Eagle's Nest	34.015101°S 18.414951°E	
Groot Constantia	34°1′36.5″S 18°25′27.1″E	
High Constantia	34.024382°S 18.427116°E	
Klein Constantia	34°2′19″S 18°24′46.5″E	
Steenberg Vineyards	34.071355°S 18.425549°E	

== List of wineries in Durbanville ==
Name	Coordinates	Remarks
Altydgedacht	33°50′45.0″S 18°37′27.4″E	
Antikes	33°49′27.0″S 18°34′52.6″E	
Bloemendal	33°50′22.6″S 18°36′2.8″E	
Canto	33°48′19.9″S 18°37′26.3″E	
D'Aria	33°50′28.1″S 18°36′34.3″E	
De Grendel	33°50′37.2″S 18°34′1.8″E	
De Vallei	33°50′25″S 18°36′46″E	
Diemersdal	33°48′4.5″S 18°38′25.4″E	
Durbanville Hills	33°49′29″S 18°33′59″E	
Groot Phesantekraal	33°47′45″S 18°40′10″E	
Hilcrest	33°49′36″S 18°35′29″E	
Klein Roosboom	33°49′7″S 18°34′24″E	
Maastricht	33°48′32.7″S 18°37′31.2″E	
Meerendal	33°47′56″S 18°37′26″E	
Nitida	33°50′4″S 18°35′37″E	
Signal Gun	33°49′12″S 18°36′41″E	

== List of wineries in Elgin and Walker Bay ==
Name	Coordinates	Remarks
Bouchard Finlayson Winery	34°22′54″S 19°14′30.9″E	
Charles Fox Cap Classique Wine Estate	34°14′14.9″S 19°4′42.5″E	
Hamilton Russell Vineyards	34°23′23″S 19°14′30.6″E	
Paul Cluver Estate Wines	34°10′6.2″S 19°5′8.1″E	
Lothian Vineyards	34°11′30″S 18°58′55″E	
Newton Johnson Family Vineyards	34°22′3.72″S 19°15′34.56″E	

== List of wineries in Franschhoek ==
Name	Coordinates	Remarks
Akkerdal	33°52′43″S 19°2′57″E	
Allee Bleue Winery	33°51′55″S 18°58′47″E	
Augusta	33°53′35″S 19°5′41″E	
Atlas Swift	33°54′50″S 19°5′13″E	
Boekenhoutskloof Winery	33°56′33″S 19°6′28″E	
Boschendal	33°52′39″S 18°58′22″E	
Burgundy Bourgogne	33°55′52″S 19°6′41″E	
Cabriere Estate	33°54′44″S 19°7′5″E	
Chamonix	33°53′58″S 19°7′41″E	
Dieu Donne	33°53′48″S 19°7′48″E	
Eikehof	33°53′16″S 19°4′54″E	
Elephant Pass	33°55′6″S 19°7′38″E	
Franschhoek	33°54′16″S 19°6′43″E	
Glen Wood	33°54′50″S 19°5′13″E	
Grande Provence	33°53′55″S 19°6′12″E	
Haute Provence	33°53′49″S 19°6′5″E	
Jean Daneel	33°54′58″S 19°7′22″E	
La Cotlog Inn	33°54′26″S 19°7′3″E	
La Couronne Wine Estate	33°55′13″S 19°6′43″E	
La Motte	33°52′49.9″S 19°4′28.3″E	
Landau Du Val	33°55′12″S 19°6′48″E	
La Terra de Luc	33°53′15″S 19°6′43″E	
Leopard's Leap	33°53′08.7″S 19°04′49″E	
Les Chenes	33°53′42″S 19°7′55″E	
L'Ormarins Winery	33°52′19″S 18°59′54″E	
Mont Rochelle	33°54′40″S 19°6′31″E	
Moreson	33°53′14″S 19°3′29″E	
Rickety Bridge	33°53′57″S 19°5′34″E	
Rupert & Rothschild Vignerons	33°50′14.5″S 18°56′51.1″E	
Solms-Delta Wine Estate	33°51′51″S 18°59′23.8″E	
Stony Brook Vineyards	33°56′23.2″S 19°07′20.6″E	
Tenfifty Six	33°53′31″S 19°5′32″E	
Von Ortloff	33°54′21″S 19°5′59″E	

== List of wineries in Helderberg ==
Name	Coordinates	Remarks
Vergelegen	34°4′37″S 18°53′30.6″E	

== List of wineries in Paarl and Wellington ==
Name	Coordinates	Remarks
Backsberg Estate Cellars	33°49′42.8″S 18°54′53″E	
Bosman Family Vineyards	33°37′34″S 19°1′29″E	
Bovlei	33°38′18″S 19°1′36″E	
Cape Wine Cellars	33°38′2″S 18°59′37″E	
Diemersfontein	33°39′38″S 19°00′16″E	
Drakensig Wine Cellars	33°49′54″S 18°56′48″E	
D.G.B.	33°37′55″S 18°59′9″E	
Fairview	33°46′14″S 18°55′41″E	
Glen Carlou	33°48′34.2″S 18°54′14″E	
Goed Moed	33°45′27″S 18°58′4″E	
Hildebrand	33°39′31″S 19°1′47″E	
Kleinbosch Wines	33°38′2″S 18°59′37″E	
Klein Rhebokskloof	33°39′46″S 19°1′56″E	
Mont du Toit	33°39′31.2″S 19°2′2.5″E	
Noble Hill wine estate	33°49′38″S 18°56′18″E	
Plaisir de Merle Winery	33°51′0″S 18°56′36.2″E	
S.F.W.	33°38′32″S 18°59′13″E	
Upland Organic Estate	33°40′20″S 19°02′38″E	
Vrede en Lust	33°50′15.9″S 18°57′13.4″E	
Wamakersvallei	33°38′9″S 18°59′25″E	
Welgemeend	33°47′51″S 18°53′09″E	
Wellington	33°38′5″S 18°59′26″E	
Windmeul Kelder	33°40′18″S 18°54′37″E	
Ziggurat Winery	33°49′21″S 18°55′47″E	

== List of wineries in Robertson ==
Name	Coordinates	Remarks
Bon Courage Wine Estate	33°50′43.8″S 19°57′38″E	
Graham Beck Wine	33°48′14.04″S 19°47′59.78″E	
Rietvallei Wine Estate	33°49′36″S 19°58′38″E	
Rooiberg Winery	33°46′35.3″S 19°45′42.9″E	
Springfield Estate	33°49′44″S 19°54′54″E	
Van Loveren		
Weltevrede Wine Estate	33°56′30.9″S 20°3′4.4″E	

== List of wineries in Stellenbosch ==
Name	Coordinates	Remarks
Anwilka		
Beyerskloof Wine Farm	33°53′28″S 18°49′23.6″E	
Blaauwklippen Vineyards	33°58′22.65″S 18°50′50.76″E	
Bonfoi	33°53′31″S 18°46′29″E	
Delheim	33°52′10″S 18°53′8″E	
Dornier Wines	33°59′34″S 18°52′13″E	
Jordan	33°56′34″S 18°44′41″E	
Kanonkop	33°51′18.4″S 18°51′36.1″E	
Kleine Zalze	33°58′13.66″S 18°50′09.55″E	
L'Avenir	33°53′18.7″S 18°50′59.1″E	
Meerlust Estate	34°1′1.7″S 18°45′24.7″E	
Mooiplaas Wine Estate	33°54′56″S 18°44′14″E	
De Morgenzon	33°56′28″S 18°46′1″E	
Neetlingshof Estate	33°52′26″S 18°48′9″E	
Overgaauw	33°56′52″S 18°47′37″E	
House of J.C. le Roux	33°54′10″S 18°48′36″E	
Rust en Vrede	33°59′54″S 18°51′22.5″E	
Rustenberg Wines	33°53′44.8″S 18°53′33.6″E	
Saxenburg	33°56′47.9″S 18°43′9.4″E	
Simonsig	33°52′12.1″S 18°49′31.7″E	
Spier Wine Farm	33°58′23″S 18°46′56″E	
Stellenzicht	33°59′50″S 18°46′17″E	
Thelema Mountain Vineyards	33°54′30″S 18°55′23.4″E	
Dewaal	33°56′30″S 18°55′23.4″E	
Warwick Wine Estate	33°50′26.6″S 18°51′51″E	
Vergenoegd Löw Wine Estate		
Waterford Estate	33°59′43.1″S 18°52′14.0″E	
Zevenwacht Wine Estate		
Zonnebloem (winery)		

== List of wineries in Swartland ==
Name	Coordinates	Remarks
Allesverloren	33°21′32.5″S 18°52′24.1″E	
AA Badenhorst		
Lammershoek	33°31′30.2″S 18°48′21.1″E	
Mullineux Family Wines		
Porseleinberg		
The Observatory		
The Sadie Family	33°31′31″S 18°48′18.1″E	

== List of wineries in Tulbagh ==
Name	Coordinates	Remarks
Montpellier	33°17′21″S 19°6′22″E	
Rijk’s Private Cellar		
Tulbagh Mountain Vineyards		
Twee Jonge Gezellen	33°14′18″S 19°6′46″E	

== List of wineries in Worcester ==
Name	Coordinates	Remarks
Groot Eiland Winery	33°39′48″S 19°18′25″E	
Kleinplasie Wine Cellar	33°38′32″S 19°28′13″E	
KWV	33°38′8″S 19°27′26″E	
Noordboland	33°38′8″S 19°27′45″E	

== List of wineries in KwaZulu-Natal ==
Name	Coordinates	Remarks
Stables Wine Estate	29°19′32″S 29°58′48″E	
Cathedral Peak Wine Estate	28°50′26″S 29°27′09″E	

== See also ==
- History of South African wine
- South African wine
- Wine regions of South Africa
