= Dornier =

Dornier may refer to:

- Claudius Dornier (1884–1969), German aircraft designer and builder
  - Dornier Flugzeugwerke, German aircraft manufacturer founded in 1914 by Claudius Dornier
- Dornier Consulting, international consulting and project management company
- Fairchild-Dornier, in 1996, Fairchild took on this name, when it purchased Dornier's assets, see Fairchild Aircraft
- Lindauer Dornier, German textile machinery manufacturer
- Dornier Wines, a winery in South Africa

== See also ==
- List of military aircraft of Germany by manufacturer#Dornier
