= Aspalathus steudeliana =

Scientific classification
- Kingdom: Plantae
- Clade: Tracheophytes
- Clade: Angiosperms
- Clade: Eudicots
- Clade: Rosids
- Order: Fabales
- Family: Fabaceae
- Subfamily: Faboideae
- Genus: Aspalathus
- Species: A. steudeliana

Binomial name
- Aspalathus steudeliana Brongn.

Species of legume

Aspalathus steudeliana is a species of Aspalathus shrub, which occurs in the Breede River Valley and Overberg regions of the Western Cape Province, South Africa.

== Description ==
An erect shrub reaching 1 meter in height, without thorns. It has small (1-3mm), slender, linear, glabrous leaves.

The flowers are bright yellow, with short, triangular calyx lobes.

It somewhat resembles the related Aspalathus smithii, Aspalathus leucophylla, Aspalathus subtingens and Aspalathus lactea.

== Distribution and habitat ==
This species is indigenous to the Breede River Valley and Overberg regions, of the southern Western Cape Province, South Africa.

It occurs from near Ashton in the north, southwards to Swellendam, Bredasdorp and the Agulhas plain. It also occurs in the area north of De Hoop, and eastwards to Heidelberg, Riversdale and Mossel Bay.

Its habitat is typically rocky, clay-rich flats, of shale, silcrete and old alluvial terraces. It grows in Renosterveld vegetation that has a partial Fynbos mixture.
