= Leopard's Leap =

Wine brand

Coordinates: 33.8861°S 19.0797°E

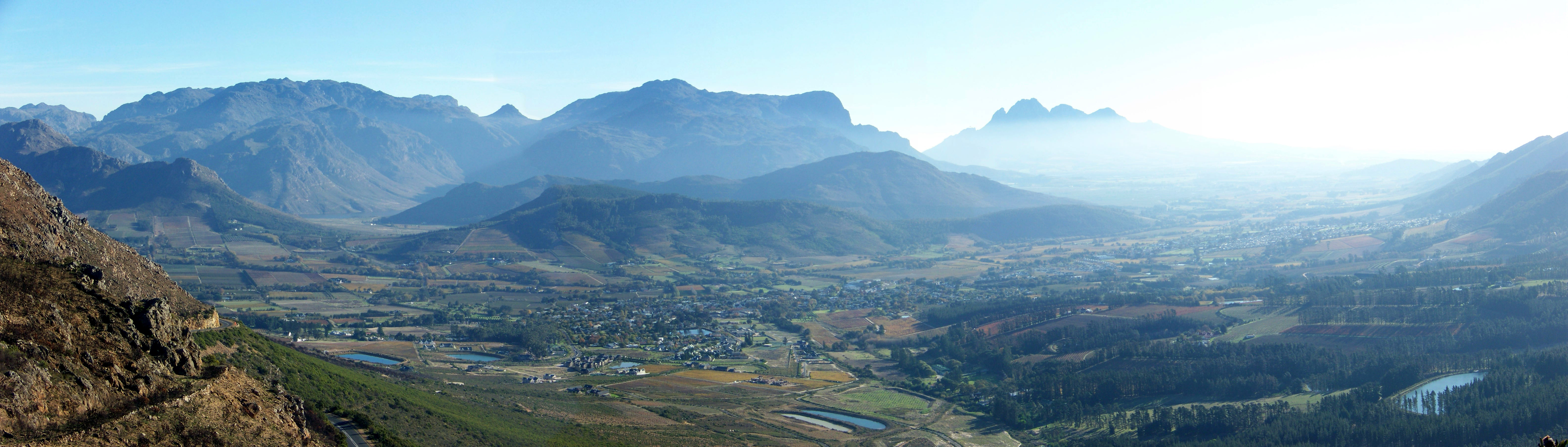
Franschhoek and Berg River Valley, location of the vineyard

Leopard's Leap is a wine producer located in South Africa. They are located in the valley of Franschhoek (Stellenbosch). The business was established by Hein Koegelenberg at the turn of the 20th century.

The winery has sponsored satellite mapping as part of a wider study of leopards in the nearby mountains. The wine estate also has motion sensor cameras around the vineyards that have detected several remaining leopards in the area.

== History ==
In 2021, a restaurant was added to the winery, designed by the Cape Town architect Mokena Makeka.

Since 2018, the winery has been increasingly exporting large quantities of wine to China. Along with La Motte and L’Huguenot (also owned by Koegelenberg) it was reported that over 3 million bottles are exported.

In December 2020, a bottle of Leopard's Leap was snatched by an actual leopard from a safari park.

In 2024, the winery participated in the Summer Wines Fest.

== Products ==
Some of the wines produced include Pinotage and Shiraz, Sauvignon Blanc and Chardonnay.

The winery produces a range of de-alcoholised wines under the brand Natura.

In 2021, the winery produced a new wine entitled Pardus, the latin name for Leopard.

== See also ==
- J. P. Chenet
- Château de Beaucastel
- Champagne Louis Nicaise
