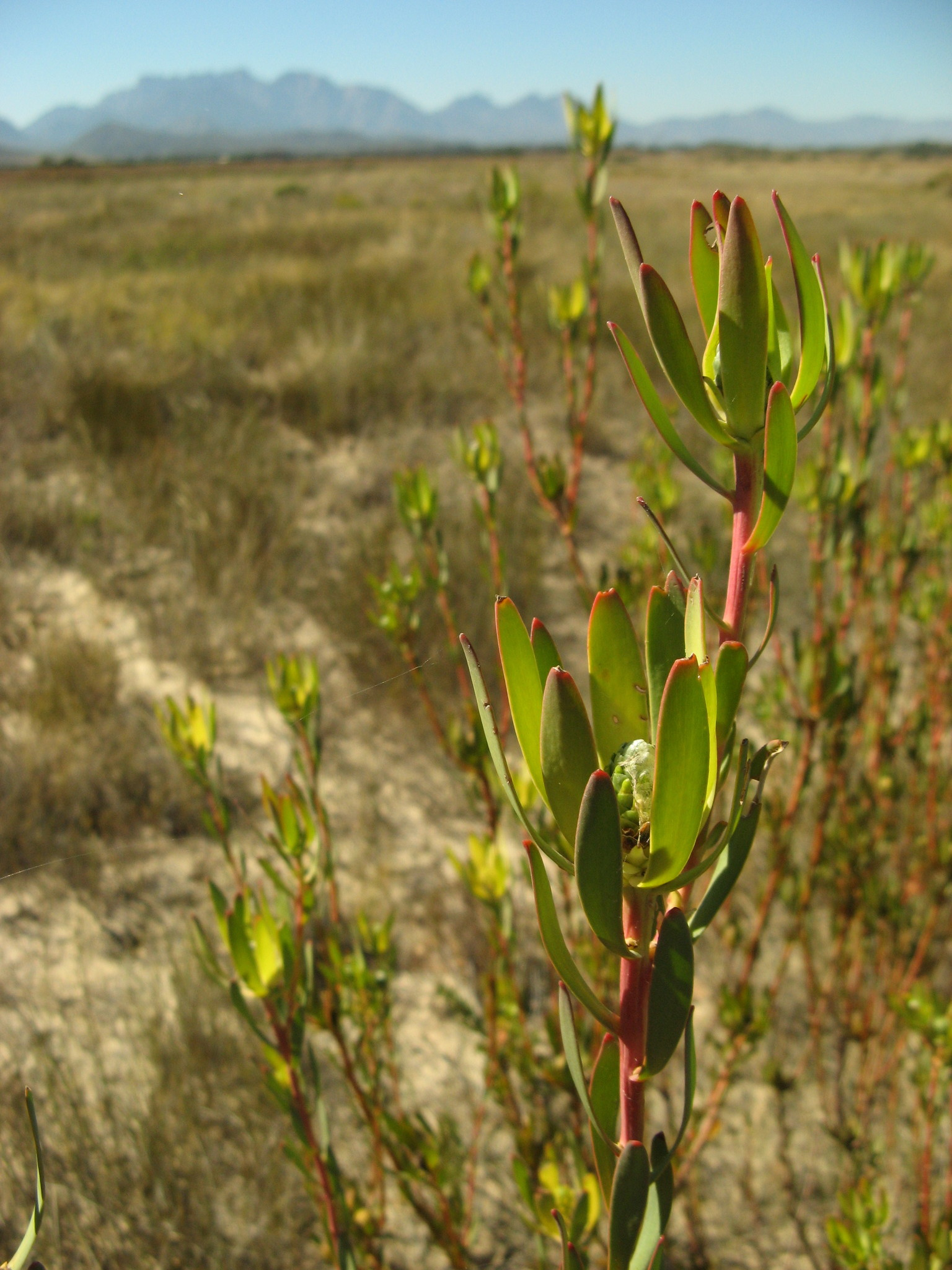

Conservation status
- Critically Endangered (IUCN 3.1)

Scientific classification
- Kingdom: Plantae
- Clade: Tracheophytes
- Clade: Angiosperms
- Clade: Eudicots
- Order: Proteales
- Family: Proteaceae
- Genus: Leucadendron
- Species: L. flexuosum

Binomial name
- Leucadendron flexuosum I.Williams

= Leucadendron flexuosum =

Species of plant

Leucadendron flexuosum, the Worcester conebush, is a flower-bearing shrub belonging to the genus Leucadendron and forms part of the fynbos. The plant is native to the Western Cape, where it occurs in the Breede River Valley near Worcester.

== Description ==
The shrub grows 2.5 m (8.2 ft) tall and flowers from April to May. The plant survives fires by sprouting from an underground rhizome. The seeds are stored in a toll on the female plant and fall out of the toll ground, which is spread by the wind. The plant is unisexual and there are separate plants with male and female flowers, which are pollinated by small towers. The plant grows mainly on water-rich plains in deep, rocky soil at an elevation of 180–200 m (590–660 ft).

In Afrikaans, it is known as the Worcestertolbos.

== Gallery ==
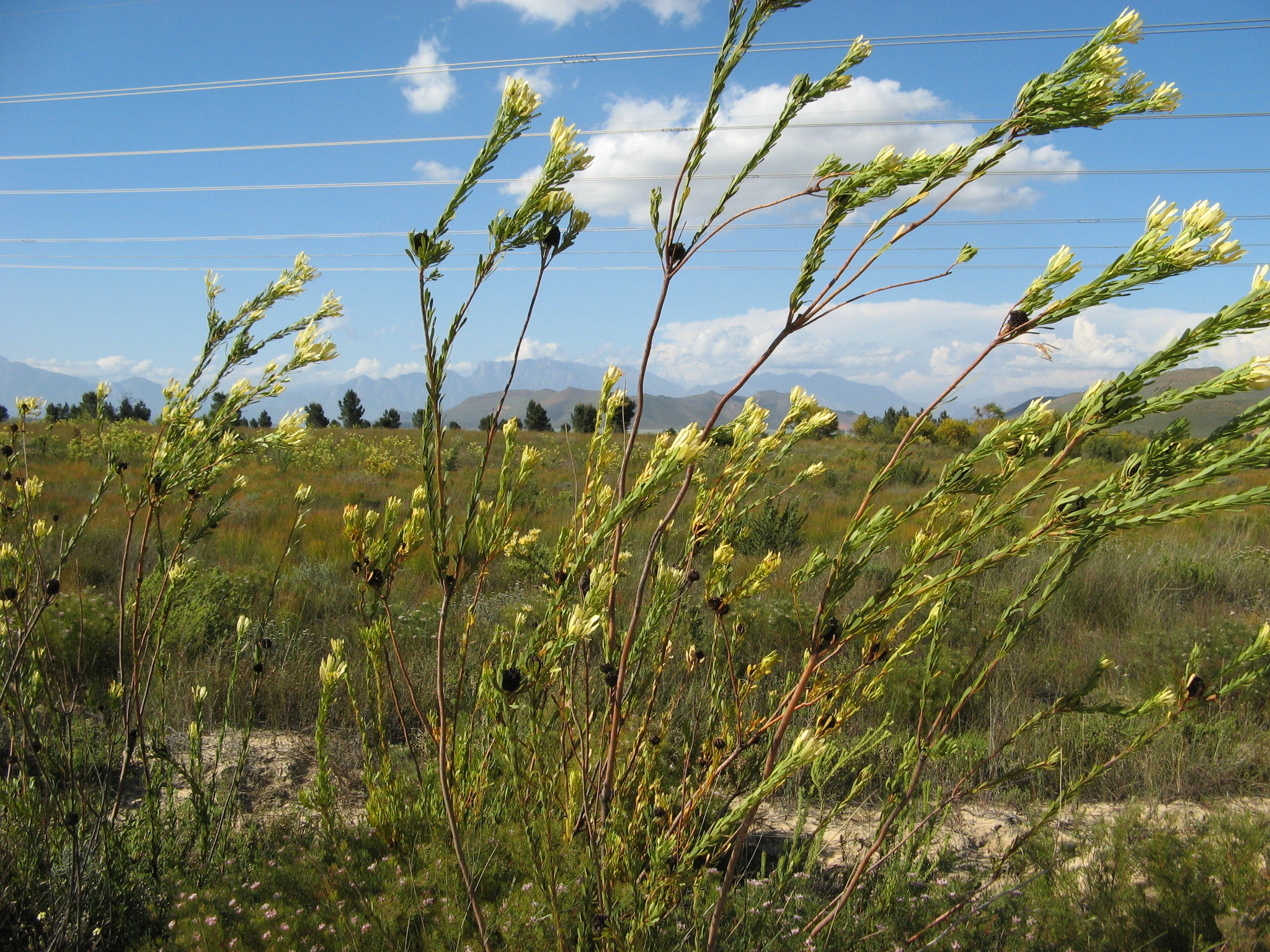

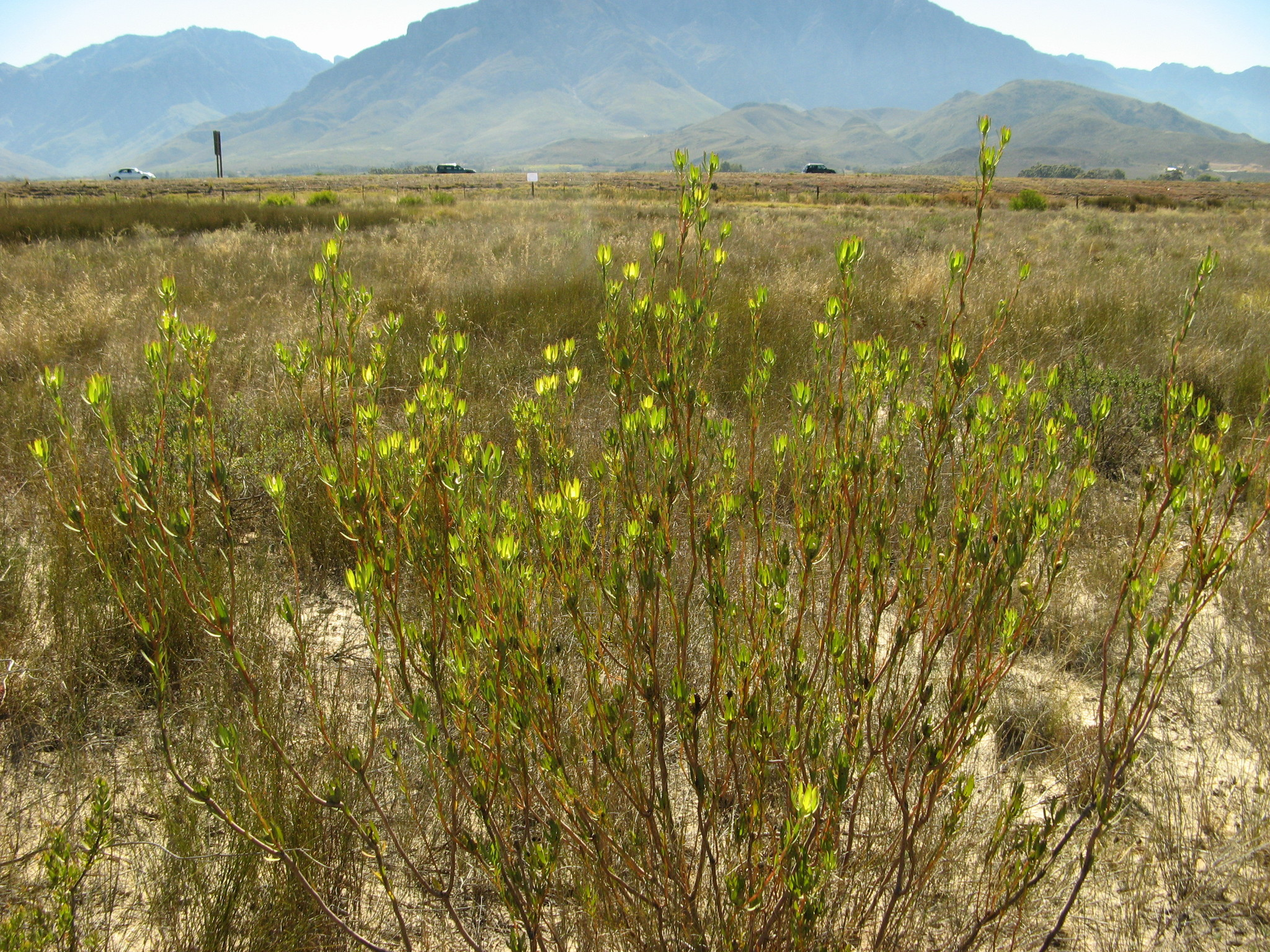
