= Rietvallei =

Rietvallei may refer to:

- Rietvallei, Gauteng
- Rietvallei, KwaZulu-Natal
- Rietvallei Wine Estate
