= Jonge =

Jonge may refer to:

- Jenever, a Dutch liquor according to the more modern (jonge = young) recipe with a smoother taste due to less malt wine. It has a protected designation of origin and is different from gin, which uses more juniper berries.
- Carla de Jonge (1886–1972), a Dutch art historian and museum director
- Cornelis Matelief de Jonge (1569–1632), a Dutch admiral who was active in establishing Dutch power in Southeast Asia
- Jan Jansz de Jonge Stampioen (1610–1690), a Dutch mathematician famous for his published work on spherical trigonometry
- Freek de Jonge (born 1944), a Dutch cabaret performer
- Hugo de Jonge (born 1977), a Dutch politician.
- Laura de Jonge (born 1960), a family advocate, corporate social responsibility practitioner, filmmaker and magazine founder
- Brendon de Jonge (born 1980), a professional golfer from Zimbabwe
- Mark de Jonge (born 1984), a male athlete who competes in canoeing
- Saskia de Jonge (born 1986), a Dutch swimmer

== See also ==
- De Jonge v. Oregon, 299 U.S. 353 (1937), a case in the Supreme Court of the United States
- Jonge Democraten (Dutch: Jonge Democraten, abbreviated as JD) is the social-liberal youth organisation of the Netherlands, founded in 1984
- Jonge Socialisten (Young Socialists within the PvdA; JS) is the political youth organization linked to the Dutch labour party
- Twee Jonge Gezellen (TJ), the oldest family owned farm in the pioneer district of Tulbagh in the Western Cape
