= Wine regions of South Africa =

Areas within South Africa where wine is manufactured

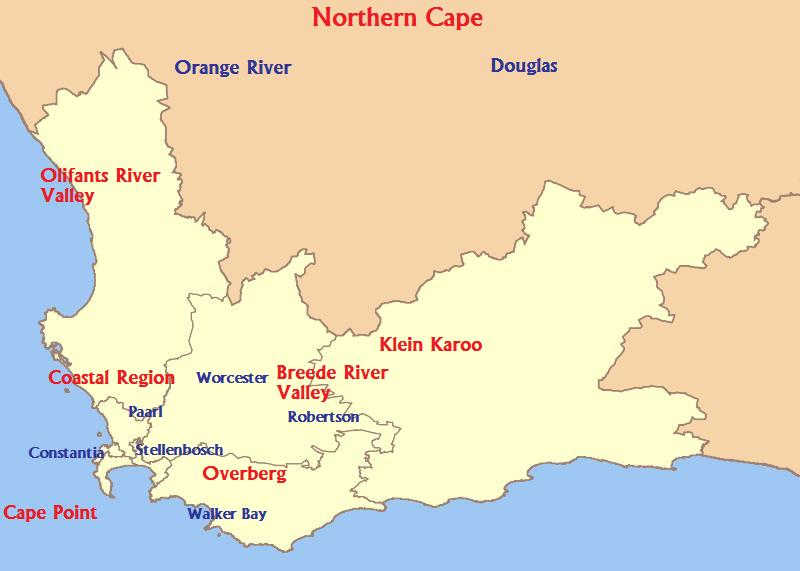
General location of some South African wine regions

The wine regions of South Africa were defined under the "Wine of Origin" (Wyn van Oorsprong) act of 1973. Mirroring the French Appellation d'origine contrôlée (AOC) system, all South African wines listing a "Wine of Origin" must be composed entirely of grapes from its region. The "Wine of Origins" (WO) program mandates how wine regions of South Africa are defined and can appear on wine labels. While some aspects of the WO are taken from the AOC, the WO is primarily concerned with accuracy in labeling. As a result, the WO does not place adjunct regulations on wine regions such as delineating permitted varieties, trellising methods, irrigation techniques, and crop yields.

The WO system divides growing regions into four categories. The largest and most generic are Geographical Units (such as the Western Cape region) which subsume the smaller, but still broad spanning Regions (such as Cape South Coast). Under these are clustered districts (like Walker Bay) and within them are wards (such as Elgin). Although these are geographic units, regions and districts are largely traced by political boundaries (wards are the segment most defined by unique, Terroir characteristics).

== Summary table ==
Geographical units	Region	District	Ward
Western Cape	Breede River Valley	Breedekloof	Goudini
			Slanghoek
			Scherpenheuvel
		Robertson	Agterkliphoogte
			Bonnievale
			Boesmansrivier
			Eilandia
			Hoopsrivier
			Klaasvoogds
			Le Chasseur
			McGregor
			Vinkrivier
	Cape South Coast	Cape Agulhas	Elim
		Overberg	Elgin
			Greyton
			Klein Rivier
			Theewater
		Plettenberg Bay	
		Swellendam	Buffeljags
			Malgas
			Stormsvlei
		Walker Bay	Bot River
			Hemel-en-Aarde Ridge
			Hemel-en-Aarde Valley
			Sunday's Glen
			Upper Hemel-en-Aarde Valley
		Other	Herbertsdale
			Stilbaai East
	Coastal Region	Cape Peninsula	
		Darling	Groenekloof
		Franschhoek/Franschhoek Valley	
		Paarl	Simonsberg-Paarl
			Voor Paardeberg
			Wellington
		Stellenbosch	Banghoek
			Bottelary
			Devon Valley
			Jonkershoek Valley
			Papegaaiberg
			Polkadraai Hills
			Simonsberg-Stellenbosch
		Swartland	Malmesbury
			Riebeekberg
		Tulbagh	
		Tygerberg	Durbanville
			Philadelphia
		Wellington	
		Other	Constantia
			Hout Bay
	Klein Karoo	Calitzdorp	
		Langeberg-Garcia	
		Other	Montagu
			Tradouw
			Tradouw Highlands
			Outeniqua
			Upper Langkloof
	Olifants River	Citrusdal Mountain,	Piekenierskloof
		Citrusdal Valley	
		Lutzville Valley	Koekenaap
		Other	Bamboes Bay
			Spruitdrift
			Vredendal
			Cederberg
			Ceres
			Lamberts Bay
			Prince Albert Valley
			Swartberg
Northern Cape		Douglas	Hartswater
			Central Orange River
			Rietrivier FS
		Sutherland-Karoo	
Eastern Cape			St Francis Bay
Free State			
KwaZulu-Natal			
Limpopo			
North-West Province			

== Geographical units ==
- Western Cape - A large multi-regional designation covering every appellation except those in the Northern Cape.
- KwaZulu-Natal - The whole Province was designated as a Geographical Unit in August 2005.
- Eastern Cape - The Eastern Cape Province was designated South Africa’s newest wine region in 2009.
- Limpopo
- Northern Cape
- Free State
- North-West Province

== Regions ==
Western Cape

- Boberg - For use in respect of fortified wines from Paarl, Franschhoek and Tulbagh.
- Breede River Valley - contains three wine districts and fifteen wards.
- Cape South Coast - contains five districts and 15 wards.
- Coastal Region - contains eight districts and seventeen wards.
- Klein Karoo - contains two districts and five wards.
- Olifants River - contains three districts and five wards.

Northern Cape

- Northern Cape - contains two districts and three wards.

Eastern Cape

- Eastern Cape - contains no districts and one ward.

== Districts ==
- Boberg - Paarl, Franschhoek and Tulbagh
- Breede River Valley - Breedekloof, Robertson, and Worcester
- Cape South Coast - Cape Agulhas, Overberg, Plettenberg Bay, Swellendam and Walker Bay
- Coastal Region - Cape Peninsula, Darling, Franschhoek/Franschhoek Valley, Paarl, Stellenbosch, Swartland, Tulbagh, Tygerberg and Wellington
- Klein Karoo - Calitzdorp and Langeberg-Garcia
- Olifants River - Citrusdal Mountain, Citrusdal Valley and Lutzville Valley
- Northern Cape - Douglas and Sutherland-Karoo,

== Wards ==
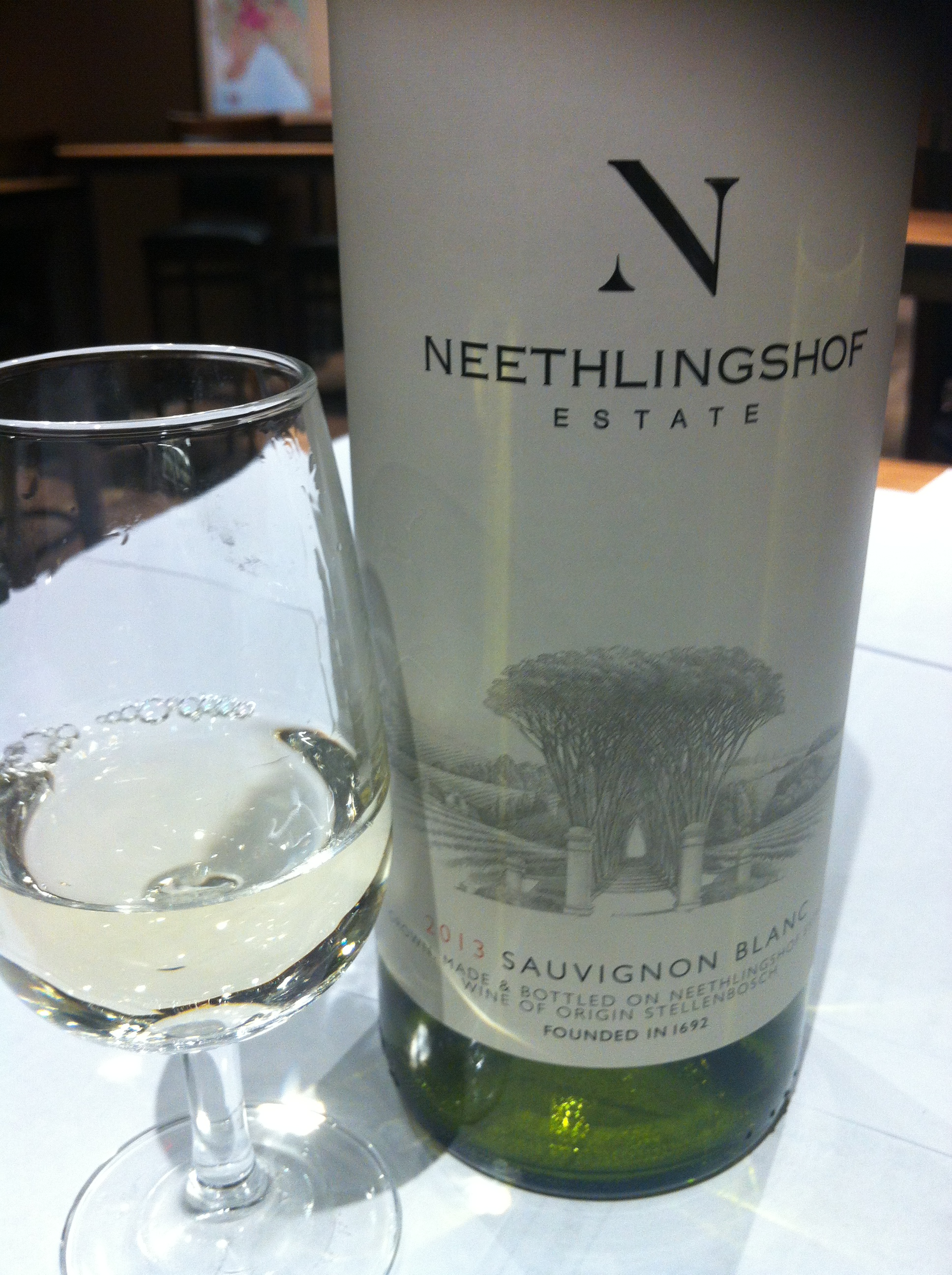
A Sauvignon blanc from the WO of Stellenbosch.

Western Cape:

- Breedekloof district of the Breede River Valley - Goudini and Slanghoek
- Robertson district of the Breede River Valley - Agterkliphoogte, Bonnievale, Boesmansrivier, Eilandia, Hoopsrivier, Klaasvoogds, Le Chasseur, McGregor and Vinkrivier
- Worcester district of the Breede River Valley - Aan-de-Doorns, Hex River Valley, Nuy and Scherpenheuvel
- Cape Agulhas district of the Cape South Coast - Elim
- Overberg district of the Cape South Coast - Elgin, Greyton, Klein River and Theewater
- Swellendam district of the Cape South Coast - Buffeljags, Malgas and Stormsvlei
- Walker Bay district of the Cape South Coast - Bot River, Hemel-en-Aarde Ridge, Hemel-en-Aarde Valley, Sunday's Glen, Upper Hemel-en-Aarde Valley
- Other wards from the Cape South Coast - Herbertsdale and Stilbaai East
- Darling district of the Coastal Region - Groenekloof
- Paarl district of the Coastal Region - Simonsberg-Paarl, Voor Paardeberg, and Wellington
- Stellenbosch district of the Coastal Region - Banghoek, Bottelary, Devon Valley, Jonkershoek Valley, Papegaaiberg, Polkadraai Hills and Simonsberg-Stellenbosch
- Swartland district of the Coastal Region - Malmesbury and Riebeekberg
- Tygerberg district of the Coastal Region - Durbanville and Philadelphia
- Other wards in the Coastal Region - Constantia and Hout Bay
- Other wards in the Klein Karoo Region - Montagu, Tradouw, Tradouw Highlands, Outeniqua and Upper Langkloof
- Citrusdal Mountain district of the Olifants River region - Piekenierskloof
- Lutzville Valley district of the Olifants River region - Koekenaap

Other wards in the Olifants River Region - Bamboes Bay, Spruitdrift, Vredendal, Cederberg, Ceres, Lamberts Bay, Prince Albert Valley and Swartberg

Northern Cape:

- Wards of the Northern Cape - Hartswater, Central Orange River and Rietrivier FS

Eastern Cape:

- Wards of the Eastern Cape - St Francis Bay

== See also ==
- List of wineries in South Africa
- History of South African wine
- South African wine
