= Rawsonville =

Town in Western Cape, South Africa

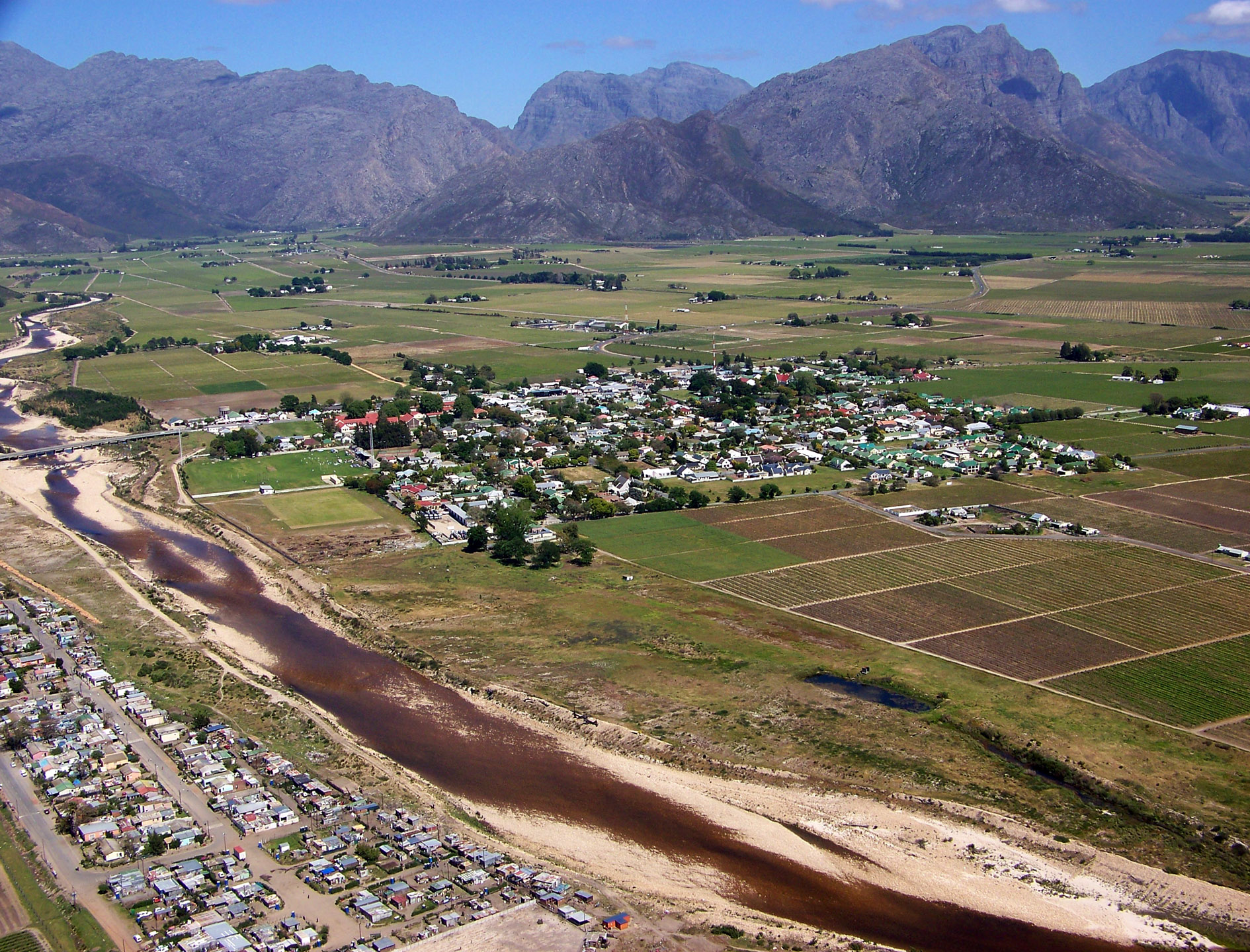
- Aerial view of Rawsonville and the Smalblaar River, looking towards Du Toitskloof Pass to the west

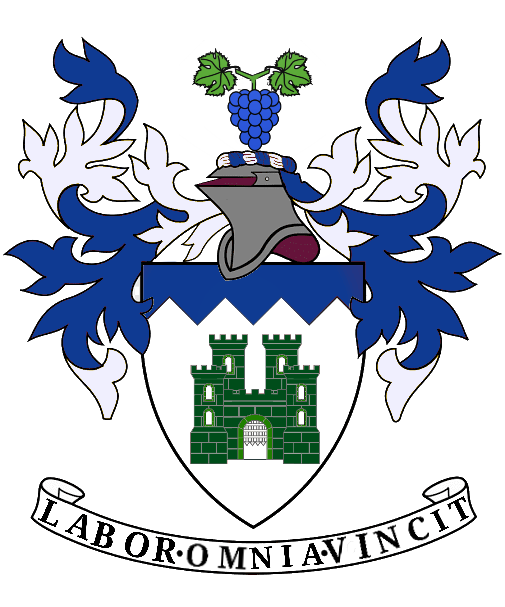
- Coat of arms
- Motto: Labor Omnia Vincit (Latin: Work Conquers All)
- Location within Western Cape Location within South Africa
- Coordinates: 33°41′4.9″S 19°18′54″E
- Country: South Africa
- Province: Western Cape
- District: Cape Winelands
- Municipality: Breede Valley

Government
  - Type: Ward 20
  - Councillor: Aron Pietersen (DA)

Area
  - Total: 2.42 km^{2} (0.93 sq mi)
- Elevation: 223 m (732 ft)

Population (2011)
  - Total: 3,099
  - Density: 1,280/km^{2} (3,320/sq mi)

Racial makeup (2011)
  - Black African: 8.5%
  - Coloured: 66.8%
  - Indian/Asian: 0.2%
  - White: 23.9%
  - Other: 0.6%

First languages (2011)
  - Afrikaans: 95.2%
  - Xhosa: 1.7%
  - English: 1.5%
  - Other: 1.5%
- Time zone: UTC+2 (SAST)
- Postal code (street): 6845
- PO box: 6845
- Area code: 023
- Website: breedekloof.com

Rawsonville is a small wine growing and farming community in the Breede River Valley of the Western Cape province of South Africa. The town forms part of the Breede Valley Local Municipality, and is located in a scenic portion of the valley on the eastern flanks of the Du Toitskloof Mountains.

The town is part of the Breedekloof Wine Route and hosts the annual Breedekloof extreme sports festival. The economy remains heavily reliant on serving the agricultural community, however tourism in the form of weekend retreats are becoming more important to the town's income. Rawsonville is 90 kilometres (56 miles) to the east of Cape Town and 15 kilometres (9.3 miles) to the west of the large town of Worcester.

== Early history ==
=== Old Goudini Farms ===
Slanghoek, Klipdrift, Groot Vlakte, Groot Eiland, Gevonden, Goudyn, Boontjiesrivier, Dasbosch Rivier, Pokkekraal and Aan-de-Smalblaar were some of the original farms occupied by European settlers since 1709.

=== Town ===
By the 1850s the necessity for the formation of a hamlet had become clear; the ward was cut off from Worcester during the rainy season when the Breede River burst it banks regularly.

The farm Aan-de-Smalblaar was transported to Johannes Petrus (Jan) Jordaan on 23 July 1858. Jan Jordaan divided a portion of the farm into 57 residential plots and these were sold at a public auction on 11 June 1859. The town was named for Sir Rawson William Rawson, the Cape Colonial Secretary. Since the modern day, there is a rural suburban areas called De Nova and "Nuwe huisies"(New Houses) with the squatter camps called Spookytown, Geelkampies, Ocean view, Riverside and Bos nakata.

=== School ===
45 Deelhebbers (participants) decided to form De Goudini School in 1858 and they were represented by seven school directors. Rawsonville also consist of schools called Rawsonville Primary, Weltevrede Primary and Hoërskool Goudini and Slanghoek Primary School

=== Church ===
On 16 June 1878 a public meeting was held to ascertain if a Dutch Reformed Church Congregation should be established at Rawsonville and on 14 October 1879 the Worcester Ring Commission granted permission for the formation of the Goudini Dutch Reformed Congregation.

=== Town Management ===
Under the Village Management Act Rawsonville was granted Town Management in 1883. During the 1800s, if a doctor was needed someone had to travel to Worcester on horseback or on foot and if it rained continuously for six hours, the Smalblaar River burst its banks and the water ran through town. Under these circumstances no school was attended.

== Climate ==
The climate is hinterland (further from oceanic influences) mediterranean, with cool, rainy winters and warm, dry summers. Due to its more inland location, winters can sometimes get frosty, with heavy snowfalls sometimes falling on the surrounding high ground. Summers are generally mild, although some February and March days can reach 38 °C (100 °F) or higher.

== Vineyards ==
Located within the wine district of Breedekloof, Rawsonville is part of the Breedekloof wine route, a scenic byway that passes 22 wineries of differing sizes.

A new community centre with facilities including a meeting hall and classrooms was opened in the town in 2018 for the Merwida wine estate. It is used by over 450 people, most of whom are vineyard workers.

== Gallery ==
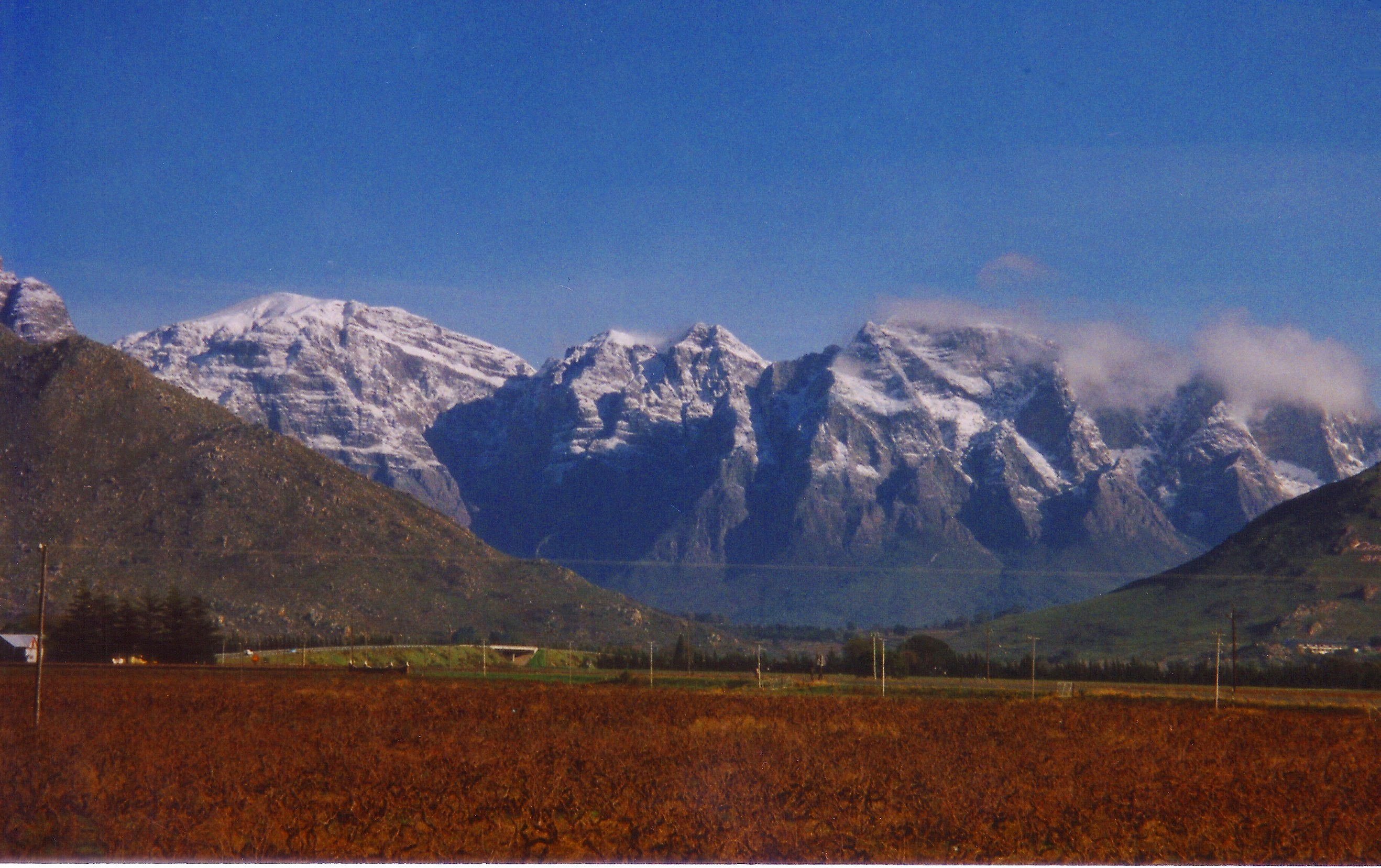
Vineyards and the Slanghoek Mountains outside Rawsonville

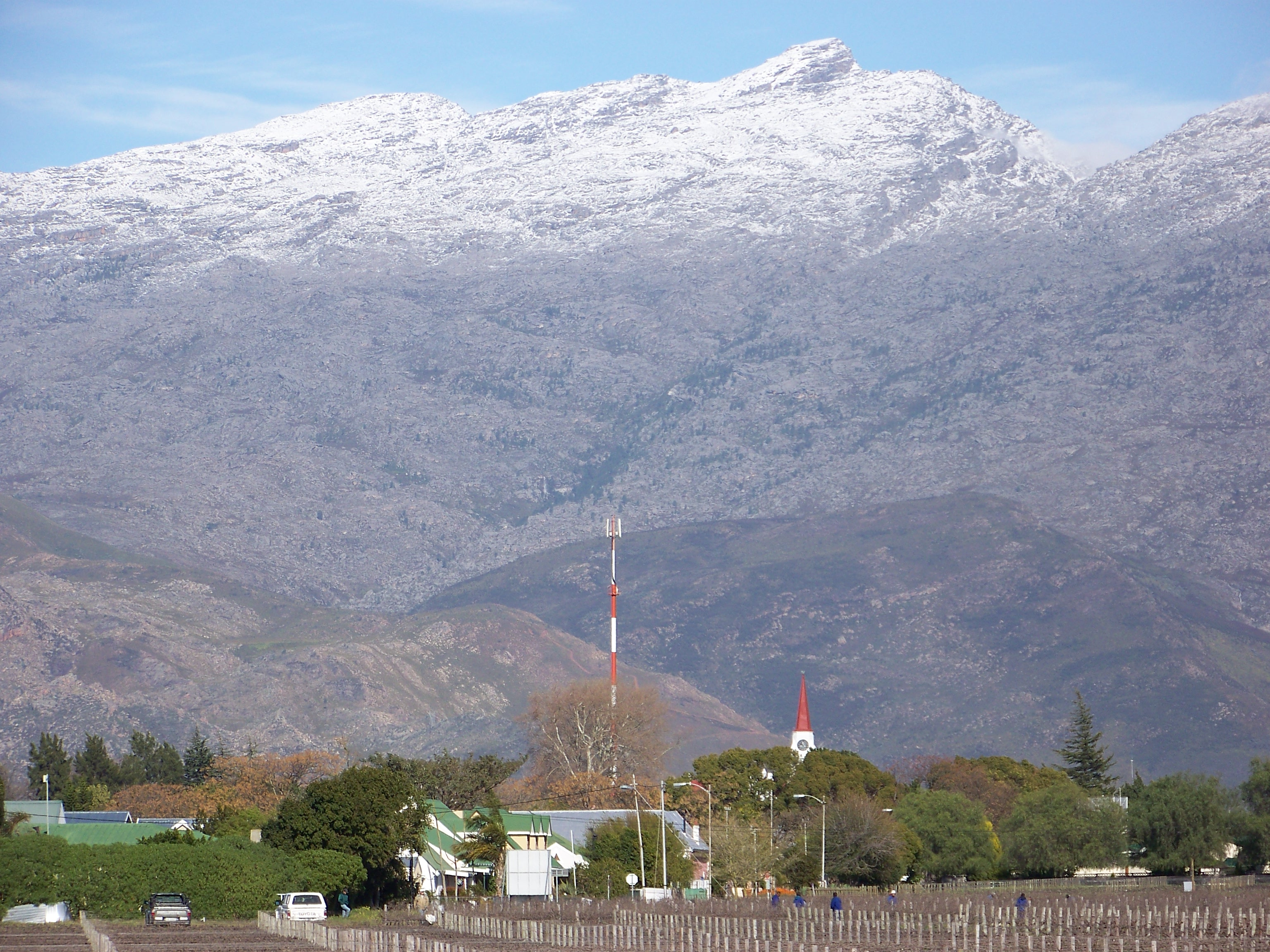
Rawsonville beneath Du Toitskloof Mountains

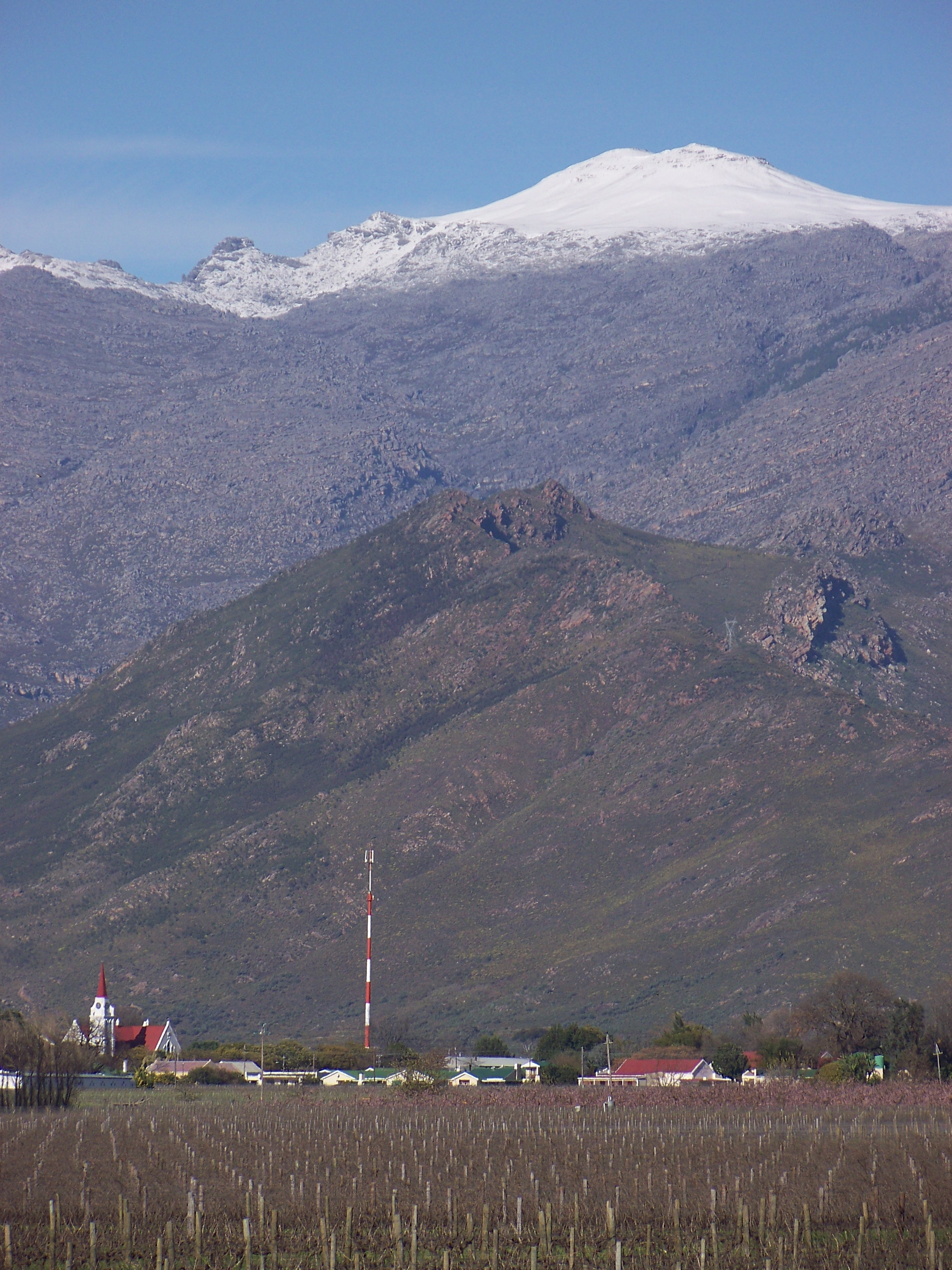
View of Rawsonville village, with Goudini Sneeukop mountain (nicknamed 'Sneeukoppie') beyond
