= Graham Beck =

- Born: Graham Joshua Beck; 5 December 1929; Faure, Western Cape, South Africa
- Died: 27 July 2010 (aged 80); London, United Kingdom
- Resting place: Jerusalem, Israel
- Education: University of Cape Town
- Occupations: Mining Tycoon, Stud Farmer, Wine Maker, Entrepreneur
- Spouse: Rhona Beck
- Children: 2

Graham Beck (5 December 1929 – 27 July 2010) was a South African business magnate, wine maker, stud farmer and philanthropist. He was one of the richest men in South Africa.

== Early life and education ==
Beck was born in Faure in the Western Cape region of South Africa in 1929 into a Jewish family. His father was a stockbroker who encouraged him to enter the coal mining business. After matriculating from Kingswood College he went on to complete a Bachelors of Commerce degree from the University of Cape Town.

== Career ==
After graduating from university Beck started working on South Africa's coal mines. He obtained his blasting certification and obtaining a working knowledge about the coal mining industry he began buying up smaller coal mines that larger companies were not interested in and made them profitable. He was closely linked to the South African mining magnate Cyril Ramaphosa who was Kangra's primary empowerment partner. After selling his coal interests in 2006 he focused on horse breeding and wine making.

He first started his wine making career when he bought his first farm in Robertson in 1983, starting the wine farm from scratch. He recognised that the area's limestone soil might be good for both wine making and horse breeding. He bought Bellingham winery in Franschhoek in the 1990s and founded the Graham Beck wine label there in 1998. He started one of South Africa's first sparkling wine brands.

In 1989 he bought the Douglas Green Bellingham wine company for R12 million giving him access to their distribution network. In 2005 he purchased Steenberg Hotel and Steenberg Winery in the Constantia Wine Route, Tokai, Cape Town, South Africa. He owned both the Gainesway Farm stud farm in Kentucky, United States and the Highlands stud farm in South Africa.

He founded Kangra Group and the non-profit Graham Beck Foundation. He owned the stud farm Gainesway Farm in the United States and the wine farm Steenberg in Cape Town in addition to other wine farms in Robertson and Franschhoek. He netted R1.08 billion in 2006 from the sale of his 60% stake in Kangra Group's coal operation to the Spanish company Fenosa.

== Death ==
Beck died on 27 July 2010 in London from lung cancer. He was buried in Jerusalem.
