= KwaZulu-Natal wine =

Kwazulu-Natal (highlighted)

KwaZulu-Natal is designated as a geographical unit under the Wine of Origin classification of South African wine. It corresponds to the province of KwaZulu-Natal in the east of South Africa, which has an embryonic wine industry.

== History ==
The first trials of Vitis vinifera in KwaZulu-Natal were in 1992 at Sunwich Port on the South Coast.

Tiny and Judy van Niekerk established the Stables Wine Estate in 2005, the first wine estate in KwaZulu-Natal, and released the first wines from the region in 2006. Judy van Niekerk was responsible for having KZN designated as a "Wine of Origin" region in 2005 after negotiations with SAWIS.

Owners and winemakers Ian and Jane Smorthwaite bought their farm Abingdon Wine Estate in 2000 and the first vines were planted in 2004. Situated at 1100m above sea level, Abingdon Estate has in excess of 2ha under vine.

Judy van Niekerk approached the KZN Government in 2007 with a proposal to fund vineyard plantings in the Tribal regions of the province, creating job opportunities in under-resourced regions. This project commenced in 2009 with newer plantings of 10ha at Ballito on the KNZ north coast. These vineyards are cultivating the French-American hybrid Villard Blanc, a grape cultivar that thrives in warm, humid conditions. The first wines of this were produced in Sept 2013 under the banner of iLembe Co-operative Winery.

== See also ==
- South African wine
- Wine regions of South Africa
