= Breedekloof =

Wine district in South Africa

The Breedekloof wine district is one of three districts in the Breede River Valley wine region. It boasts a total of 28 wine cellars (11 producer cellars and 17 private cellars). The Breedekloof represents 14.24% (13 029 hectares) of wine grape vineyard plantings in South Africa. Most traditional cultivars can be found in the Breedekloof, with Chenin Blanc being the most planted.

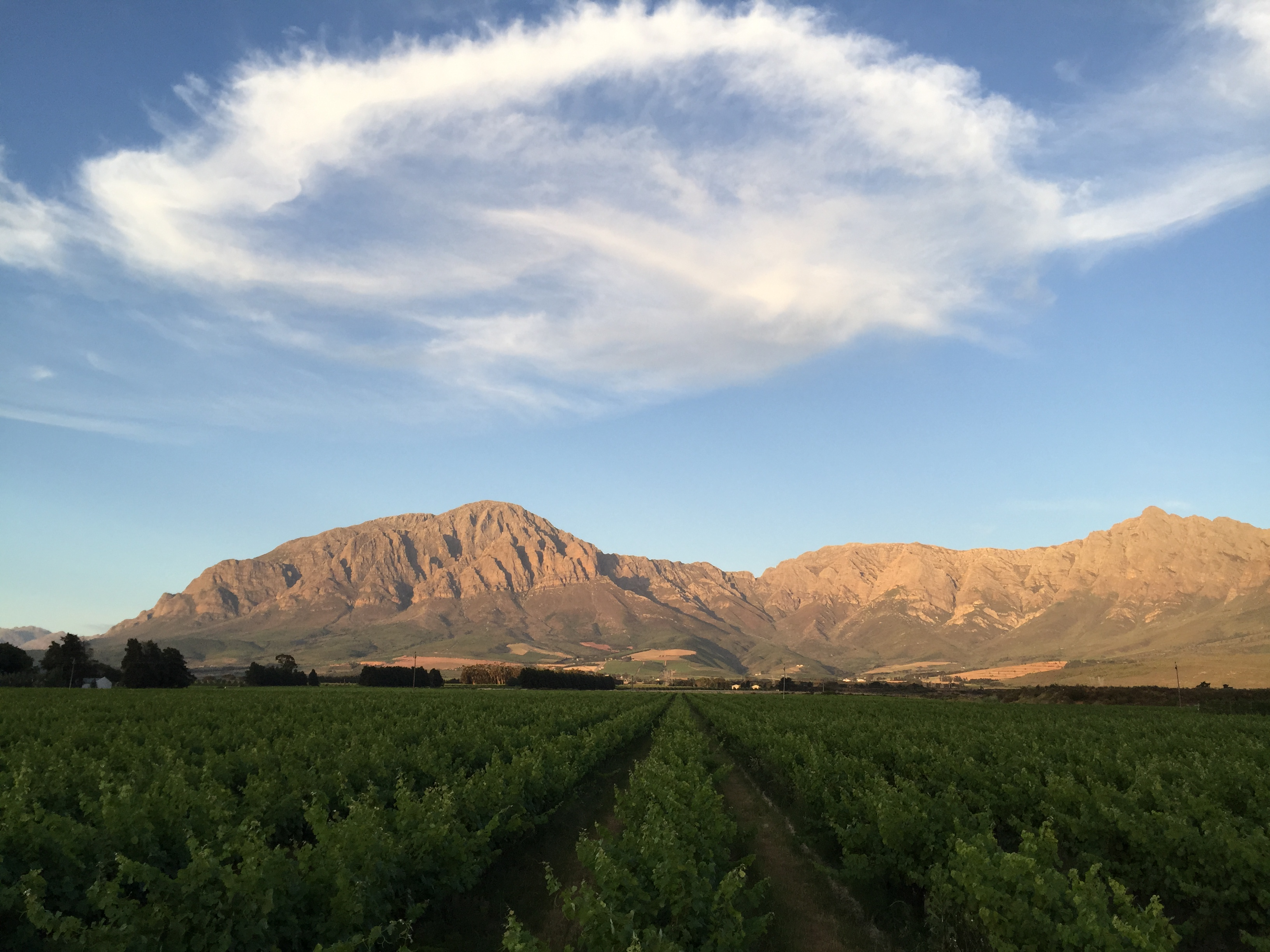
View of the mountains in the Breedekloof

== Location ==
The Breedekloof wine district is situated between Worcester and Paarl under the Breede River Valley Municipality. It includes the Rawsonville, Slanghoek, Goudini and Breerivier area. The west and south-west of Breedekloof borders the Slanghoek and Du Toitskloof Mountains and its north-eastern part is covered by the Hex River Mountains.

== Terroir ==
The Breedekloof is characterized by a great combination of terroirs. It is seamed by two mountain ranges, and nestled between the Atlantic Ocean and the Klein Karoo. The Breedekloof possesses a variety of soil that varies from deep heavy black soils to sandy shale soils in old river beds. This unique combination of soils and climate make it a favourable terroir for wine production. The Valley receives an annual winter rainfall of +- 700mm, which classifies it as a high rainfall area in South Africa.

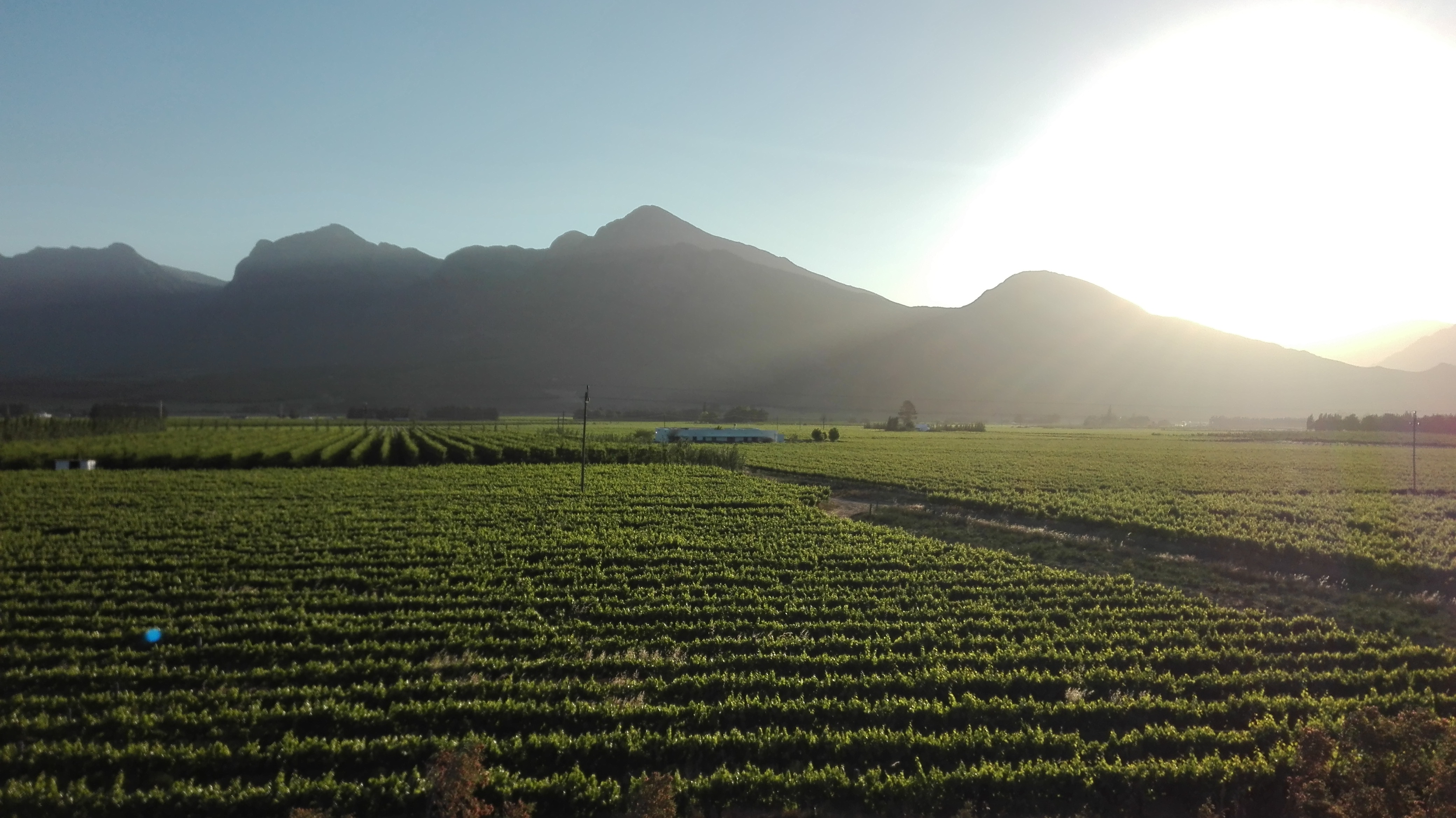
Vineyards in the Breedekloof

== Economic activities ==
The main economic activity in the Breedekloof is agriculture. It is traditionally a wine-producing area, but peaches, prunes, pears and other crops are also grown. Tourism has also become an important industry in the area with new wedding venues and guest houses providing many opportunities.

== Breedekloof Wine Route ==
The Breedekloof wine route is the youngest wine route in South Africa. It was established in 2002 and consists of 22 cellars. It runs from Gouda to Montagu (east to west) and McGregor to Tankwa-Karoo National Park (north to south).

It forms part of Route 62, which claims to be the longest wine route in the world.

== Breedekloof Wine Festival - Soetes & Sop ==
Soetes & Sop is an annual wine festival, typically hosted in July, organized by Breedekloof wine & tourism office in Rawsonville. All participating cellars (14 in 2016) are open for the event. It is a decentralized event, allowing visitors to buy a ticket which includes a wine glass and soup mug which they can use at the different cellars for tastings.

On the day visitors are able to taste a wide variety of multi award-winning soetes (also known as dessert wines), including Hanepoot, Muscadel, Noble Late Harvest, Red Jerepigo and Port. Further, many cellar pair these offerings with a variety of soups.
