= J. P. Chenet =

French wine brand

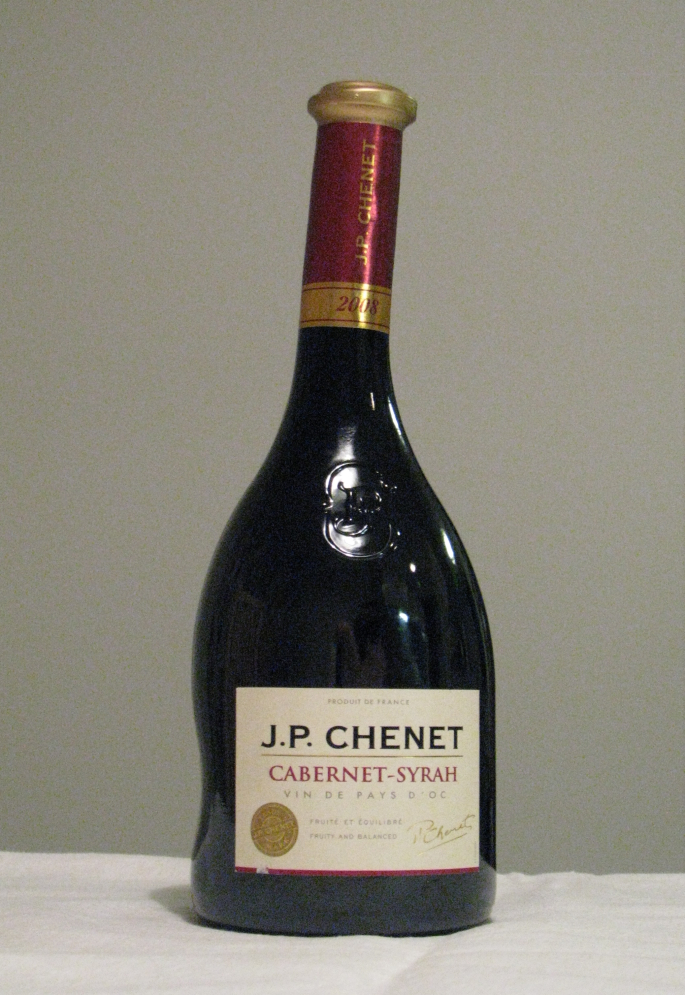
A bottle of J. P. Chenet wine

J. P. Chenet is a French wine brand that has been produced by Les Grands Chais de France since 1984. The brand is bottled with a curved bottleneck. It claims the title of most sold French wine in the world, with a distribution in more than 160 countries.

== History ==
In 1984, Les Grands Chais de France conceived of a branded bottle consisting of characteristic curved bottleneck and a large body. The design of the bottle was named "Josephine", with the brand later being named J. P. Chenet after production.

The first J. P. Chenet bottle went on sale in 1984. In 1987, a sweeter white, Vin de Pays des Côtes de Thau, and a rosé, Cinsault Vin de Pays d’Oc, were added to the range. In 1992, the brand had sold 400,000 cases of 9 litres. The brand launched a line of 25cl wines in 1994. Beginning in 1996, Les Grands Chais de France added two wines aged in barrels: Merlot-Cabernet and Chardonnay. A 3-litre bag-in-box was launched in 2000.

In 2004, 7.4 million boxes of 9 litres were sold, and Les Grands Chais de France launched a range of sparkling wines available in 750 ml and 200 ml. In 2005, the brand revised its packaging for 750ml and 250ml. The same year, the Joséphine bottle was engraved with the brand's logo for the entire wine range. In 2008, the Classic range was revamped. In 2009, Les Grands Chais de France launched a flavoured wine called Fashion.

In 2011, Les Grands Chais de France launched wine in a range of 18.7cl polyethylene terephthalate containers. The same year, they also launched a range called Terroir, offering characteristic AOP grape varieties. They launched a limited edition Cabernet-Syrah and Merlot in 2012, and launched J. P. Chenet Ice, a sparkling wine, in 2014.

== Awards ==
- J. P. Chenet won a Packaging Oscar and the Verre Avenir award in 1991.
