= Mooiplaas Wine Estate =

Winery and nature reserve in Stellenbosch, Western Cape, South Africa

Mooiplaas Wine Estate & Private Nature Reserve is a winery, vineyard and nature reserve situated in the Stellenbosch wine district of the Western Cape in South Africa. The Stellenbosch estate dates back to 1806 when the first owner, Petrus Jacobus Bosman acquired the farm. It was bought in 1963 by Nicolaas and Mercia Roos. Mooiplaas is the Afrikaans translation for 'beautiful farm'.

The winery was recognized by the World Wide Fund for Nature as a Conservation Champion in 2020.
