= Steenberg Estate =

Steenberg Estate is the site of the oldest farm in Cape Town, located in the suburb of Constantia. Steenberg is translates as “Mountain of Stone” and is named for the nearby mountain range. The manor house and other buildings on the farm have been declared a national monument. The estate has been redeveloped as a hotel, vineyard and golf course.

== History ==
Steenberg was established in 1682 by Catherina Ustings Ras, a German immigrant to the Dutch Cape Colony. Ras was granted a lease to cultivate the land by Simon van der Stel, then Governor of the Cape. She settled on the farm with her fifth husband, Matthys Michelse. The farm was named Swaaneweide, the “feeding place of the swans,” possibly in memory Ras’ hometown of Lubeck, on the Baltic East Coast of Germany. Ras was given the official deed to the farm in 1688 after Van Der Stel had founded Groot Constantia. Ras sold the farm in 1695 to Frederick Russouw, a prominent member of the Cape’s Citizen Council. Russouw planted the first vines on the estate. After his death the farm continued to be run by his widow, Christina Diemer. When The Dutch East India Company made the nearby Simon’s Bay an official winter port Diemer made a profitable business of supplying goods to the fleet and giving travellers shelter. Under her supervision the farm grew dramatically and 30 000 vines were planted by 1735. Swaaneweide remained with the family until 1842 when it was sold to Johannes Adrian Louw, brother-in-law to one of Diemer’s grandsons. The Louw’s retained ownership of the farm for the next 150 years until 1990, when it was purchased by Johannesburg Consolidated Investments (JCI) and redeveloped as a hotel, vineyard and golf course. The hotel was developed from the old farm buildings, the 1740 manor house and the Jonkershuis. The homestead of the farm was declared a national monument in 1983. The estate changed hands several times until it was purchased by Graham Beck’s Kangra Group.

== Facilities ==
Facilities at the Steenberg Estate include: A boutique Hotel which occupies buildings dating back to 1682 as well as some new construction; Vineyards - Wine cultivation at Steenberg dates back to 1695 but it was extensively replanted after the farm was purchased by Kangra. The farm predominantly produces white varieties; and, a golf course – As a part of the redevelopment by JCI an 18-hole golf course was built. The course was designed by Peter Matkovich.

== Awards ==
The Hotel on the Steenberg Estate was voted Best Luxury Hotel in Africa in 2011 by TripAdvisor. Great Wine Capitals named Steenberg as one of nine global winners in their Best of Wine Tourism Awards. Steenberg was also rated as a Top Hotel in Africa and the Middle East in the 2011 Conde Nast Traveller US Reader’s Choice Awards.
