= Charles Fox Cap Classique Wine Estate =

South African wine estate

Coordinates: 34°14′14.9″S 19°4′42.5″E

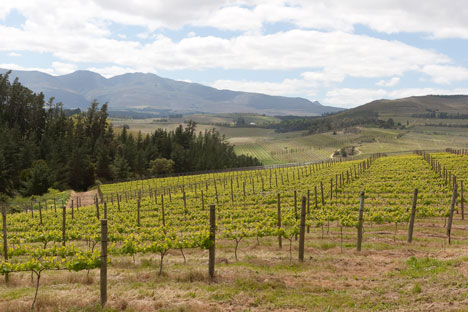
Vineyard Photo at Charles Fox Cap Classique Wine Estate

Charles Fox Cap Classique Wine Estate is a wine estates in South Africa that specialises in the Cap Classique method and is located in Elgin, Western Cape.

== The Estate ==
Originally a fruit farm planted with apples, pears and plums, Furneaux farm was purchased by Charles and Zelda Fox in 2005 after an inter-regional search for Cap Classique-specific terroir. The cellar was built in 2010 with an underground storage capacity of 200 000 bottles.

In concordance with advice on clone and site selection from viticulturist Paul Wallace, 6.3ha of land was planted to 10 blocks of vines. These face north-east and south on an elevation between 230m and 300m above sea level. Perold-trellised rows were planted in a north-west to south-east direction primarily to minimise wind damage.

An analysis conducted by soil scientist Johann Lanz indicates that the soils are mainly Tukulu with a thin horizon of clay grading into weathered shale in the subsoil. These soils are well suited to quality wine production. Water is well retained so drip irrigation is used twice a year at most. Kevin Watt has been the consultant viticulturist since 2008.

== The Wines ==
The vineyards at Furneaux farm have been planted with the three traditional Champagne varietals Pinot Noir, Chardonnay and Pinot Meunier. The wines are blended by Nicolas Follet, a Riems-based Champagne producer.

== See also ==
- Elgin, Western Cape
