= Beau Constantia =

Boutique wine estate in Cape Town

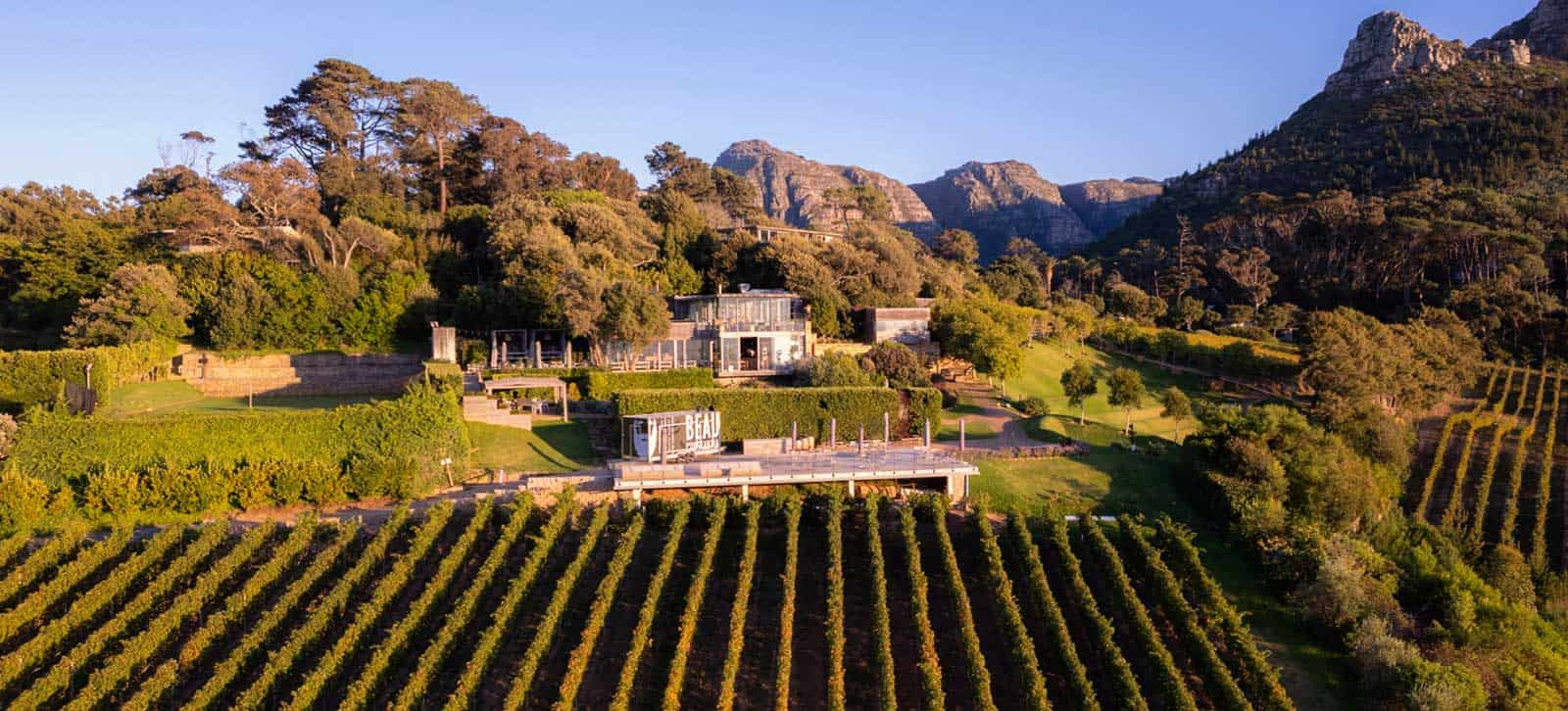
- Aerial view of Beau Constantia wine estate, Constantia Nek
- Location: Constantia, Cape Town, South Africa
- Coordinates: 34°0′48.57″S 18°24′21.67″E
- Founded: 2002
- Website: beauconstantia.com

Beau Constantia is a boutique wine estate located at the top of Constantia Nek in Constantia, Cape Town, South Africa. Situated on the north-east facing slopes of the Vlakkenberg at elevations of up to 360 metres above sea level, the estate produces limited-edition wines from 11.47 hectares of vineyard. In 2025, it was ranked 20th in the inaugural IWSC Top 50 Wine Producers worldwide.

== History ==
The property that now forms Beau Constantia was previously operated as a goat farm. In 2000, devastating fires destroyed the fynbos and pine forests on the slopes. Pierre and Cecily du Preez purchased the 22-hectare property in 2002 with the intent to restore it to its original state. This required the clearing of alien vegetation and the establishment of firebreaks before any agricultural development could proceed.

Following extensive soil analysis, the first vineyards were planted in 2003 under the guidance of Japie Bronn, who served as the estate's inaugural farm manager. The Pas de Nom wine range, introduced later, was created in his memory.

The estate's first commercial wine, a Viognier, was released under the Cecily label and won Best Viognier at the Novare Terroir Wine Awards in 2011.

== Location and vineyard ==
Beau Constantia lies within the Constantia wine appellation on the Cape Peninsula, approximately 20 kilometres from the centre of Cape Town. Its vineyards occupy the steep, north-east facing slopes of the Vlakkenberg. The highest vineyard blocks, from which the estate's Pierre wine is sourced, sit at elevations of 360 metres above sea level — among the highest in the Constantia Valley, and among the steepest agricultural terrain in the Western Cape.

The estate covers 22 hectares in total, with 11.47 hectares under vine. Sandy sandstone soils and Atlantic breezes from False Bay — visible from the vineyard — contribute to wines of distinct minerality.

== Winemaking ==
Megan van der Merwe has served as head winemaker since 2019, having joined the estate as an assistant winemaker in 2015. Her approach centres on minimal intervention and what she describes as "a zero-compromise approach when it comes to growing the best quality fruit." In September 2025, van der Merwe was named Rising Star of the Year in Tim Atkin MW's South Africa Special Report, with Atkin describing her as "not just a force of courage but a force of nature." The report, Atkin's thirteenth annual survey of South African wine, sampled 2,000 wines from 425 wineries.

The estate produces two ranges. The Family Range comprises wines named after members of the Du Preez family: Cecily (100% Viognier), Pierre (Sauvignon Blanc and Semillon blend,), Stella (Syrah), Karin (Cabernet Franc rosé), Aidan (a five-variety red blend), and Lucca (Merlot and Cabernet Franc). The Pas de Nom range — whose name translates from French as "without a name" — was created as a tribute to Japie Bronn.

== Recognition ==
In November 2025, Beau Constantia was ranked 20th in the inaugural IWSC Top 50 Wine Producers, a list that evaluated producers across three years of competition results. The ranking was noted in South African and international wine press as part of a strong performance by South African estates, 14 of which appeared in the top 50. That same year, the Cecily 2024 received a gold medal and 95 points at the IWSC.

At the 2025 International Wine Challenge, the Stella 2022 was awarded the South African Red Trophy and the South African Syrah Trophy, scoring 96 points — the competition's highest award for South African red wine that year. The Pierre 2024 also received a gold medal at the same competition, scoring 95 points.

In Tim Atkin MW's 2025 South Africa Special Report, both the Pierre 2024 and the Stella 2023 scored 94 points — the joint-highest scores in the Beau Constantia range. The Lucca 2021 was awarded a gold medal at the Concours Mondial de Bruxelles 2025. Five wines — the Pierre 2023, Cecily 2023, Lucca 2020, Stella 2022, and Aidan 2020 — received 4.5 stars in the Platter's Wine Guide 2025. Megan van der Merwe was also named among the Top 10 Next Generation winemakers by WineMag.co.za's iTOO Next Generation Awards 2025.

In 2022, the Pierre 2021 received a Gold award and 95 points at the Decanter World Wine Awards.

== Chefs Warehouse at Beau Constantia ==
Chefs Warehouse at Beau Constantia is a fine-dining restaurant that has operated on the estate since approximately 2016. It is part of the Chefs Warehouse group founded by chef Liam Tomlin, with Ivor Jones leading the kitchen at the Beau Constantia venue. Jones previously served as head chef at The Test Kitchen, Cape Town.

The restaurant occupies a purpose-built glass and timber structure on the estate, overlooking a kitchen garden from which it sources produce. Its format is a set tasting menu of contemporary sharing plates. The Infatuation, an independent restaurant guide, described it as a destination for "a spectacular lunch or dinner in Cape Town's wine country."

The restaurant has been recognised with a Three-Star rating by Eat Out, South Africa's principal restaurant guide, in 2023, and a Two-Star rating in 2025. At the 2025 Eat Out Woolworths Restaurant Awards, Jones was awarded the S.Pellegrino and Acqua Panna Chefs' Chef prize. Chefs Warehouse at Beau Constantia is also listed on the World's 50 Best Discovery programme.

== See also ==
- Constantia, Cape Town
- South African wine
- Chefs Warehouse
- Liam Tomlin
