= Champagne Louis Nicaise =

Champagne house in Grand Est, France

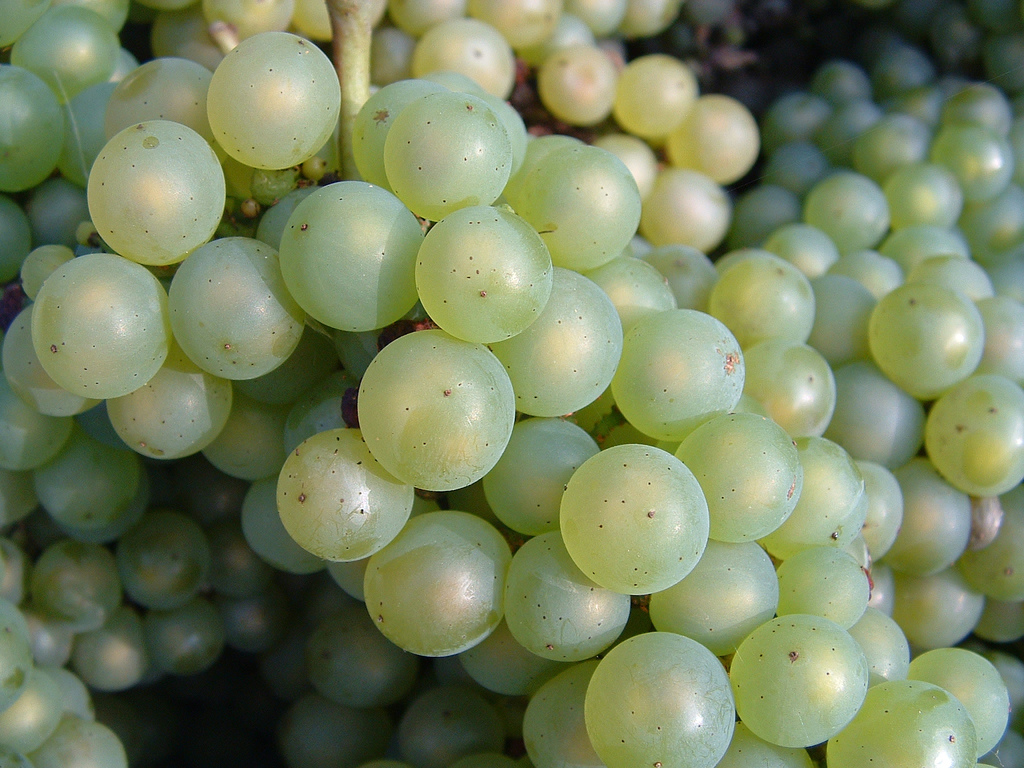
Chardonnay grapes are one of the varietals grown at Champagne Louis Nicaise

Champagne Louis Nicaise is a Champagne house located in Hautvillers, the Premier Cru village made famous by Dom Perignon. The house grows the traditional Champagne varietals: Chardonnay, Pinot Noir, and Pinot Meunier, and only 6,000 cases per year are produced. The current owner-winemakers are married couple Laure Nicaise-Préaux & Clement Préaux. Laure Nicaise-Préaux is the fourth generation of her family to make Champagne in the estate. Clement Préaux had apprenticed under Anselme Selosse. Changes implemented by the couple include lowering the dosage and earning certification in sustainability.
