= History of South African wine =

History of wine in South Africa

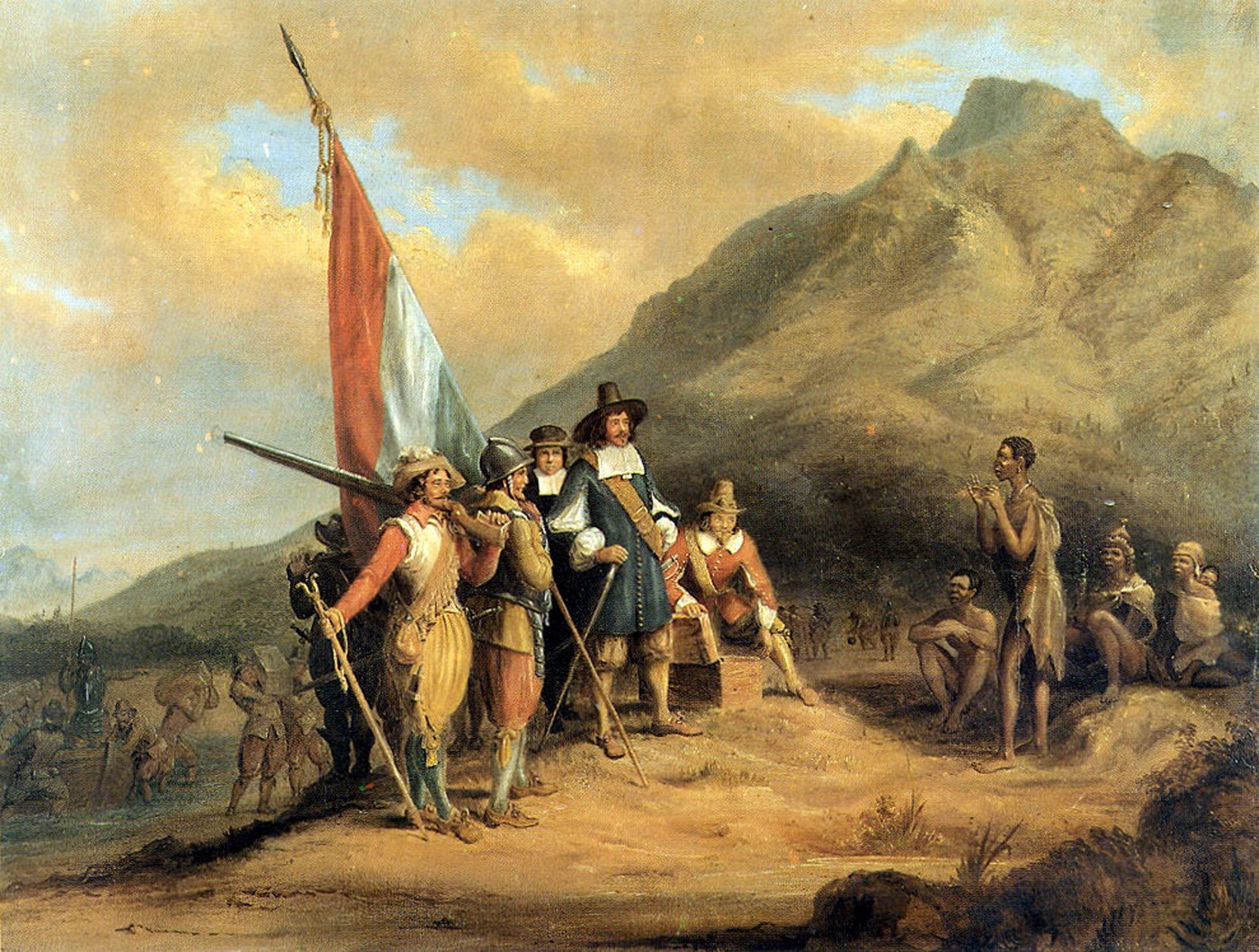
Landing of Van Riebeeck at the Cape of Good Hope in 1652 (c. 1850) by Charles Davidson Bell

The early history of the South African wine industry (also known as New World wine) can be traced to the founding of a supply station at the Cape of Good Hope by the Dutch East India Company. Jan van Riebeeck was given the task of managing the station and planting vineyards to produce wine and grapes in the Wijnberg (Wine mountain Area) that could be used to ward off scurvy for sailors continuing on their voyages along the spice route. In 1685, Cape Governor Simon van der Stel purchased a large 750-hectare (1,900-acre) estate, founding what later became the world-renowned Constantia wine estate. In the 19th century South Africa fell under British rule, which proved lucrative for the wine industry as South African wine flowed into the British market. This prosperity lasted until the 1860s when the Cobden–Chevalier Treaty, signed by the Palmerston government and France, reduced the preferential tariffs that benefited South African wine in favor of French wine exports.

Following the devastation from the phylloxera epidemic in the late 19th century, many vineyards were replanted with high yielding grape varieties such as Cinsaut. By the early 1900s there was a large glut of wine, creating a wine lake effect which led some producers to pour their unsaleable wine into local rivers and streams. The depressed prices caused by this out-of-balance supply and demand dynamic prompted the South African government to fund the formation of the Koöperatieve Wijnbouwers Vereniging van Zuid-Afrika Bpkt (KWV) in 1918. Initially started as a co-operative, the KWV soon grew in power and prominence, setting policies and prices for the entire South African wine industry. To deal with the wine glut the KWV restricted yields and set minimum prices, encouraging the production of brandy and fortified wines.

For much of the 20th century, the wine industry of South Africa received very little attention on the worldwide stage. Its isolation was further deepened by boycotts of South African products in protest at the country's system of Apartheid. It wasn't until the late 1980s and 1990s when Apartheid was ended and the world's export market opened up that South African wines began to experience a renaissance. With a steep learning curve, many producers in South Africa quickly adopted new viticultural and winemaking technologies. The presence of flying winemakers from abroad brought international influences and focus on well known varieties such as Shiraz, Cabernet Sauvignon and Chardonnay. The reorganization of the powerful KWV co-operative into a private business further sparked innovation and improvement in quality. Vineyard owners had previously relied on KWV's price-fixing structure, that bought their excess grapes for distillation. Now they had to shift their focus to quality wine production in order to compete. In 1990, less than 30% of all the grapes harvested were used for wine aimed at the consumer market, with the remaining 70% being discarded, distilled into brandy or sold as table grapes and juice. By 2003 these proportions had reversed, with more than 70% of the grapes harvested that year reaching the consumer market as wine.

== Settlement of the Cape of Good Hope ==
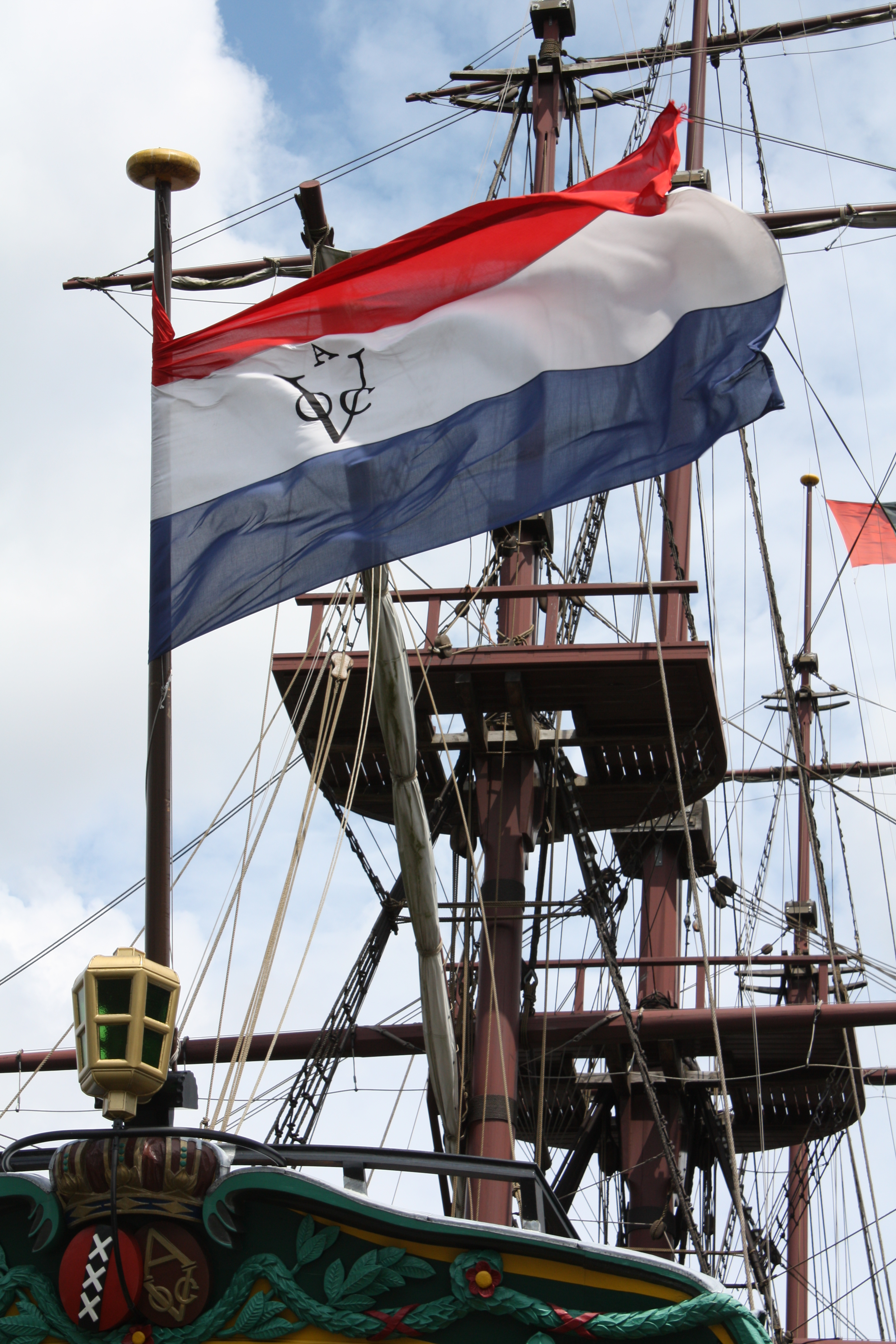
Replica of an East Indiaman of the Dutch East India Company/United East India Company (VOC).

When Bartolomeu Dias and other Portuguese explorers first encountered the Cape of Good Hope in the 15th century, they found little motivation to colonize the sparse and empty land around the Cape. In the early 17th century, the Dutch trading port of Batavia, in what is now Indonesia, grew to such a size that trading vessels were regularly dispatched on the long voyage from the Netherlands to Asia. The managers of the Dutch East India Company began looking for a logical midway point on the voyage to build a supply station that would serve the sailors making the voyage to and from Asia. In 1652, a Dutch surgeon named Jan van Riebeeck was commissioned with the task of building both a fort and farming community in the Cape.

One of van Riebeeck's tasks include planting a vineyard, falsely believing the consumption of grapes and the wine produced from them is effective in avoiding scurvy among sailors on long sea voyages. In 1654, the Dutch East India Company sent van Riebeeck grapevine cuttings from the Rheingau. These vines were packaged in damp pieces of sailcloth which negatively affected their ability to take root in the Cape's vineyards. During the following year a larger quantity of cuttings arrived from Bohemia, the Canary Islands, France, Germany and Spain. Among these were the Muscat Blanc à Petits Grains (known as "French Muscadel") and Muscat of Alexandria, known variously as "Hanepoot", "Hanepop" and "Hanepoot Spanish". In 1659 the first South African wine made from French Muscadel grapes was successfully produced.

As production was small, the wine produced in the Cape settlement was initially intended solely for export to the trading port of Batavia. Gradually the Dutch East India Company allowed freed Company employees or vrijburghers, released from service to the company, to buy land and grow wine grapes for their own consumption. As the market for Cape wine grew, the Company brought in a winemaker from Alsace along with winemaking equipment and a cooper to make oak wine barrels. A makeshift winery was built on the Company-owned farm of Rustenberg as the South African wine industry took root.

== Founding of Constantia ==
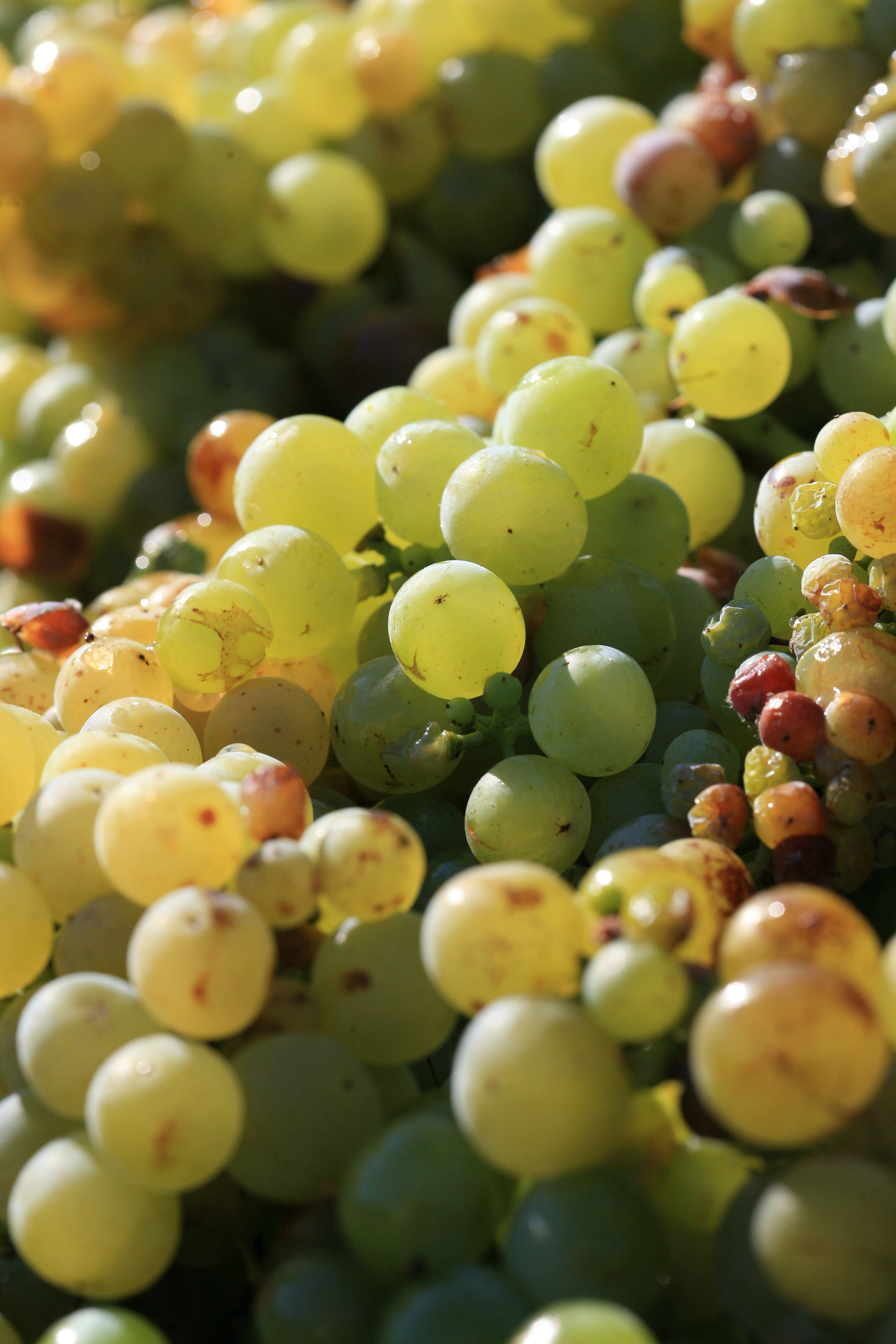
The Cape wine estate of Constantia brought world wine to South Africa for their Muscat wines.

In 1679 Simon van der Stel was appointed to succeed van Riebeeck as governor of the Cape Colony. Against Dutch East India Company regulations he orchestrated a deal for a land grant near Table Mountain for a 750-hectare (1,900-acre) estate – a grant 15 times larger than the company's normal provision. He named this estate Constantia. Legend has it he named the estate after his wife, although her name was actually Johanna. Other theories are that the name derives from one of the Dutch East India Company ships or possibly in honor of the virtues of constancy and faithfulness. Van der Stel took a keen interest in the wine production of the Cape and recruited more French winemakers to the colony. Around his estate and vineyards he planted rows of European oak trees that would shield the vines from the strong gale–force winds of the Cape Doctor. Records show that van der Stel imported many grape varieties to his estate, among them Spanish Sherry grape Palomino (known locally as "White French"), Chenin blanc (Known as "Steen") and Semillon (known as "Green Grape"). He also had a variety of Muscat grapes planted, including the Muscat Blanc à Petits Grains (which ranged in color from white to brown), Muscat of Alexandria and a red Muscat variety that was most likely Muscat Hamburg.

Throughout the Cape, van der Stel set high standards for wine production. He issued official decrees that imposed a high penalty on growers harvesting grapes before they were ripe or fermenting wine in dirty barrels. Van der Stel's dedication to quality soon garnered the wines of Constantia – and by association the Cape – a reputation for quality across Europe. Wine expert Hugh Johnson has described Constantia as the first New World wine to enjoy international acclaim. The early tasting notes from Batavia in 1692 remarked that the Cape wines of Constantia were the highest quality that had ever been exported there. In his 1705 work, Description of the Cape of Good Hope, the Dutch writer Françcois Valentijn noted that the red wines of Constantia were on the same scale of quality as the best Persian wines or Lachryma Christi from Italy. He also went on to praise the quality of the Chenin blanc Steenwyn produced at the estate.

=== Decline and revival ===
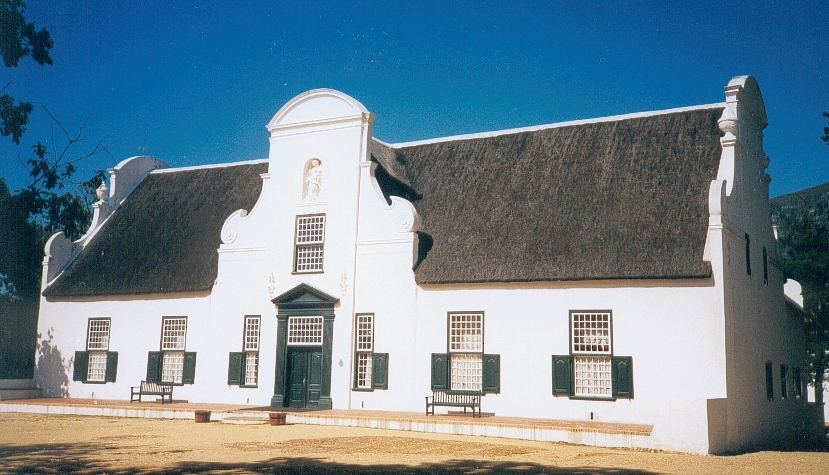
The Groot Constantia manor house

Following the death of Simon van der Stel in 1712 the estate was divided into three parts – Groot (Great) Constantia, Klein (Little) Constantia and Bergvliet. Under the ownership of Johannes Colijn Klein Constantia continued to be a standard bearer for Cape wine. In the 1770s, Groot Constantia was sold to a businessman from Stellenbosch named Hendrik Cloete, who replanted the vineyards and rebuilt the cellars in an attempt to revive the reputation of the estate. He employed nearly 100 slaves and stationed them throughout the vineyard, charged with ensuring that not a single insect landed on the vines. It was Cloete's dedication (and later that of his son, also named Hendrik) that raised the prestige of the estate and led to its prompt discovery by the British, who had recently gained control over the Cape. In his 1816 work, Topographie de Tous les Vignobles Connus, the French oenologist André Jullien included the wines of Constantia in the highest category of his expansive quality classification of the world's wine. Ranking it just below the wines of Tokay, Jullien described the dessert wine of Constantia as "...among the finest liqueur wines of the world...".

== French and Dutch influence on winemaking ==
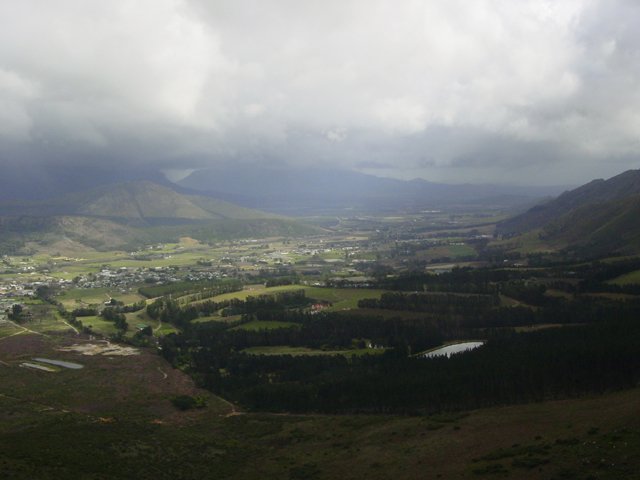
French Huguenots, who eventually settled in the Franschoek Valley, brought their winemaking and viticultural experience to the South African wine industry

Between 1688 and 1690s the Cape Colony experienced an influx of French Huguenots, driven to leave France following the Edict of Fontainebleau, which effectively revoked the Edict of Nantes. After initially forcing their integration among Dutch and German immigrant communities the Cape Governor, Simon van der Stel, eventually gave the settlers land near Boschendal in what is now Franschhoek, known as the "French corner". The Huguenots brought with them their viticulture and winemaking experience from their homeland. The descendants of these settlers still play a vital role in the South African wine industry, marrying an Old World winemaking philosophy to the technological advances of New World wine.

Detail notes from visitors to the Constantia estate in the 18th century give evidence of the Dutch influence on South African winemaking. As they did for the French centuries earlier, the Dutch introduced the technique of adding sulphur to halt fermentation before all the residual sugar has been completely converted into alcohol. This allowed the wine to maintain its sweetness without increasing the alcohol level, similar to adding brandy in the production of fortified sweet wines; another technique pioneered by the Dutch. To keep an eye on the ongoing process of fermentation, Cape winemakers would listen near the bunghole of the wine barrel for noise and irritation in the barrel, described as sounding like the barrel was full of crabs. When the barrel was completely quiet and no longer making crab-like noises the wine would finally be racked for clarification and stabilization.

== Under British rule ==
Having consolidated their rule over South Africa in 1815, the British found a ready supply of wine now firmly within their control. Since losing control of the Aquitaine and Bordeaux nearly 350 years earlier, securing a steady stream of wine for the British market had been a pressing concern for the British. By this point the wines of Constantia had become world-renowned; enthusiastic patrons across the globe included Napoleon (who requested several cases for his exile on St-Helena) and the restored French King Louis-Philippe I. American merchants gladly traded their slaves for the famous South African wine. The British public were greatly encouraged by a reduction in import duty on South African wine to a third of that imposed on Portuguese wine, which had enjoyed favorable duty rates due to the Methuen Treaty. With easy access to the lucrative British market, the South African wine industry experienced a period of prosperity that would last until the middle of the 19th century.

The mid 19th century brought a succession of calamities that crippled the South African wine industry. In 1859 oidium first appeared and quickly spread through the Cape. This was followed by a series of agreements made in 1860s (most notably the Cobden–Chevalier Treaty) between the Gladstone government and France that reduced the preferential tariffs which had benefited South African wine in favor of French wine exports. In 1866, the phylloxera epidemic reached the Cape, causing widespread devastation that would take more than 20 years to recover from.

== Wine lake effect and the rise of the KWV ==
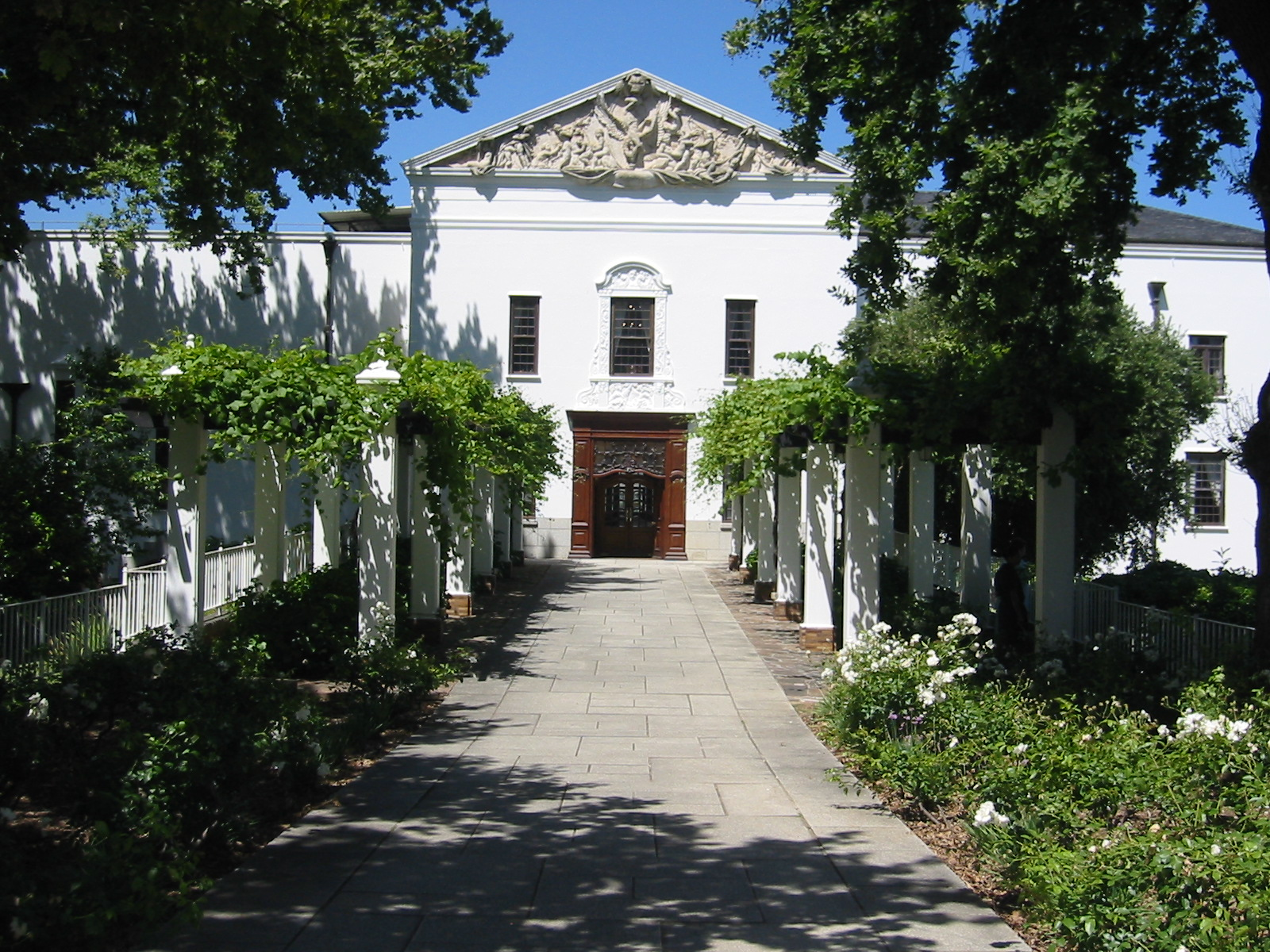
Founded in the early 20th century to help stabilized the industry, the KWV with its headquarters in Paarl would eventually become a powerful force in the South African wine industry

Following the devastation of the phylloxera epidemic many growers gave up on winemaking, choosing instead to plant orchards and alfalfa fields to feed the growing ostrich feather industry. The growers that did replant with grapevines chose high-yielding grape varieties such as Cinsaut. By the early 1900s more than 80 million vines had been replanted, creating a wine lake effect. Some producers poured unsaleable wine into local rivers and streams. To compound matters the entire worldwide wine market was in the midst of a downturn, exacerbated by World War I. Depressed prices caused by this imbalance in supply and demand prompted the South African government to fund the formation of the Koöperatieve Wijnbouwers Vereniging van Zuid-Afrika Bpkt (KWV) in 1918. Initially started as a co-operative, the KWV soon grew in power and prominence until it was able to set policies and prices for the entire South African wine industry. To deal with the wine glut, the KWV restricted yields and set minimum prices that encouraged the production of brandy and fortified wines.

By 1924, nearly 95% of all vineyard owners belonged to the KWV, allowing it to exert enormous power on the pricing structure and direction of the South African wine industry. The KWV was able to regulate planting rights for new vineyard properties, specify permitted grape varieties, limit harvest yields, regulate production methods and impose quotas on how much wine needed to be distilled for fortified wine production. While the activities of the KWV was able to stabilize the South African industry, it also stagnated the industry by limiting innovation and improvements in quality. This stagnation was compounded by the isolation South Africa experienced during the Apartheid era.

== Apartheid and emergence from isolation ==
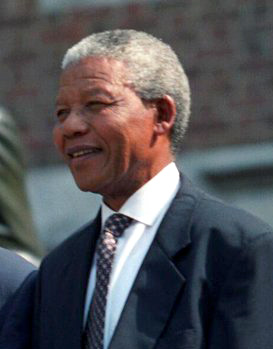
The South African wine industry was isolated from the rest of the world until the end of Apartheid in the late 20th century, heralded by the election of Nelson Mandela.

Wine expert Jancis Robinson notes that the history of the South African wine industry in the 20th century shows how intimately wine mirrors social and political change. For much of the 20th century, the wine industry of South Africa received very little attention on the worldwide stage. Its isolation was further deepened by boycotts of South African produce in protest at the country's system of Apartheid. It wasn't till the late 1980s and 1990s when Apartheid was ended and the world's export market opened up that South African wines began to experience a renaissance. With a steep learning curve, many producers in South Africa quickly adopted new viticultural and winemaking technologies. The presence of flying winemakers from abroad brought international influences and focus on well known varieties such as Shiraz, Cabernet Sauvignon and Chardonnay. The reorganization of the powerful KWV co-operative into a private business further sparked innovation and improvement in quality. Vineyard owners and wineries that previously relied on the price-fixing structure to buy their excess grapes for distillation had to shift their focus to quality wine production in order to compete. In 1990, less than 30% of all the grapes harvested was used for wine production meant for the consumer market with the remaining 70% being discarded, distilled into brandy or sold as table grapes and juice. By 2003 the numbers had switched with more than 70% of the grapes harvested that year reaching the consumer market as wine.

During the 21st century the growing influence of black people in the wine industry brought a significant change in the South African wine industry. Through various Black Economic Empowerment (BEE) programs, black ownership and involvement in vineyards and wineries has been steadily increasing. In 1997, the first winery with significant black involvement, New Beginnings was founded in Paarl and was followed by Thandi in Elgin. In 2001 Mont Rochelle Mountain Winery in the Franschhoek Valley became the first wholly black-owned winery in South Africa when it was purchased by Miko Rwayitare, a businessman from the Democratic Republic of the Congo.

== See also ==
- List of wineries in South Africa
- Economic history of South Africa
