= Dornier Wines =

Dornier Wines, established in 1995, is located at foot of the Stellenbosch Mountains in South Africa's Stellenbosch wine region. The winery is named after the German artist Christoph Dornier; he was the youngest son of aircraft designer Claude Dornier. In 1995 Dornier started the estate by purchasing their first of five farms and the winery has since grown to more than 800 hectares. The land itself has a wine-growing history that dates to the mid 1960s. Since 2006, Dornier has been a member of the Biodiversity and Wine Initiative, which contributes to the sustainable cultivation of the vineyards and the protection of the local fynbos. In 2007 Dornier opened their Bodega Restaurant in one of the oldest buildings of Stellenbosch.

Wines produced from this winery has received some awards from International Wine and Spirit Competition and Decanter World Wide Awards and their labels have been recognized by the design community.
