= Twee Jonge Gezellen =

Vineyard and winery in South Africa

Twee Jonge Gezellen (TJ) is a farm, winery and vineyard in the pioneer district of Tulbagh (Cape Winelands District Municipality) in the Western Cape, South Africa. Translated from Dutch, the name means Two Young Bachelors. The farm was started by two young bachelor cousins in 1710. Locals referred to the farm as "the place where the two young bachelors stay," and the name stuck. In September, 2011 the farm was placed under provisional liquidation after their Land Bank loan could not be repaid.

Vinimark bought the operation in 2012.
