= Rietvallei Wine Estate =

Wine estate in Western Cape, South Africa

Coordinates: 33°49′36″S 19°58′38″E

Rietvallei Wine Estate is one of South Africa's oldest family-owned wine estates in the Robertson Wine Valley, Western Cape. The estate has been in the Burger family for six generations and is situated in the Klaas Voogds Valley. It covers a total area of 250 hectares, with 99 hectares dedicated to vineyards.

== History ==
The estate was acquired in 1864 by Alwyn Burger for his son, Jacobus Francois Burger, who founded Rietvallei Wine Estate. Since its establishment, the estate has remained in the family and continues to be managed by the Burger family. Rietvallei is believed to be the oldest wine farm in the Robertson region.

== Vineyards and Terroir ==
Rietvallei Wine Estate cultivates a mix of white and red noble grape varieties, with approximately 63% of the vineyards planted with white cultivars and 33% with red. The estate features a variety of soil types, including red calcareous clay loam, deep calcareous loam, and sandy alluvial soil. These soil compositions are said to contribute to the unique flavour and aroma of the estate’s wines, enhancing the natural sweetness and concentration of the grapes.

== Muscadel 1908 Vineyard ==
One of the estate’s most notable features is its historic vineyard, planted in 1908 with the Red Muscadel grape variety. This vineyard is recognized as the oldest of its kind in South Africa. Rietvallei produces a single-vineyard fortified wine from this vineyard called Rietvallei 1908 Muscadel. Older vintages of this wine have been featured at the Nederburg Auction, which was renamed the Cape Fine & Rare Wine Auction in 2019.

== Wine Production ==
Rietvallei produces a wide range of wines, including Sauvignon Blanc, Chardonnay, Chenin Blanc, Cabernet Sauvignon, Cabernet Franc, Petit Verdot, and Cinsaut. Additionally, the estate produces several wine labels, including Rietvallei Estate, Burger Family Wines, John B, and Stonedale.
