= Breede River Valley =

River valley region in the Western Cape, South Africa

Coordinates: 33°45′S 19°30′E

Breede River Valley is a region of Western Cape Province, South Africa known for being the largest fruit and wine producing valley in the Western Cape, as well as South Africa's leading race-horse breeding area. It is part of the Boland bordering on becoming Little Karoo towards the east.

== Geography ==
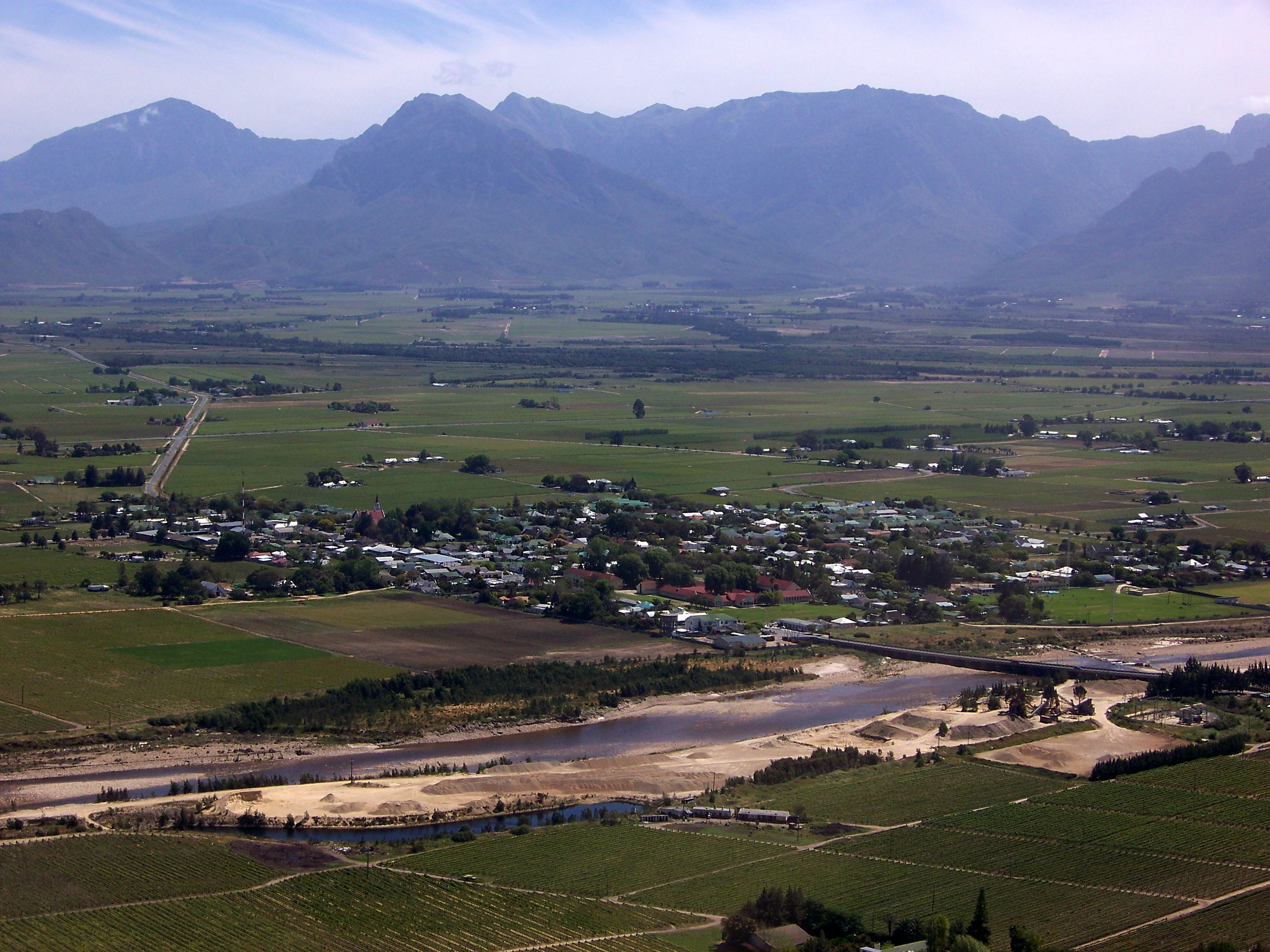
Breede River Valley aerial showing intensive viticulture and surrounding mountains

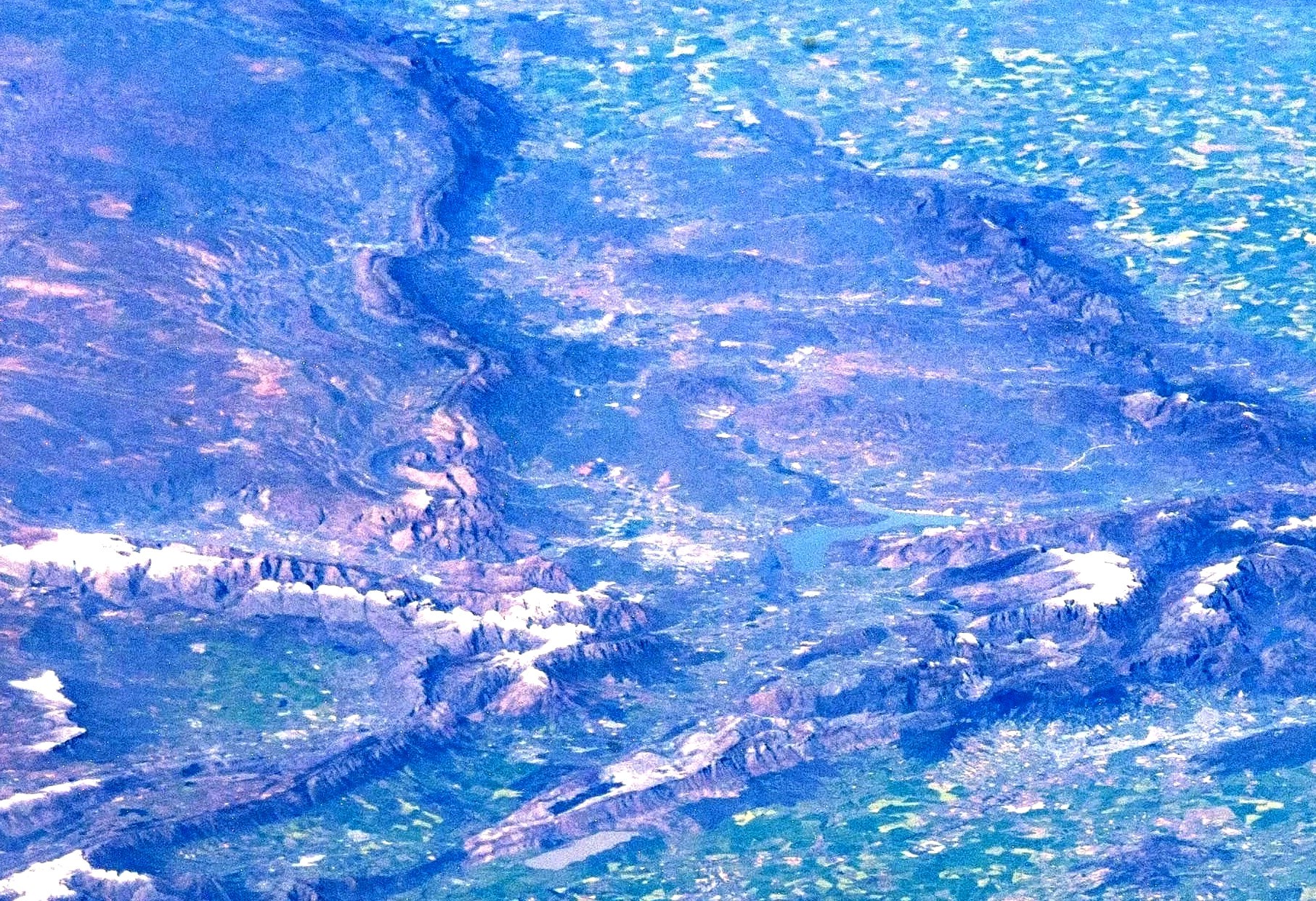
View over the valley from the International Space Station. Beyond the town of Worcester (at center) the valley is wedged between the Langeberg and Riviersonderend Mountains. Green crop fields of the Overberg are visible beyond.

The Breede River Valley is relatively broad and flat for a Western Cape valley, averaging at a floor height of 80m-250m above sea-level. Western regions are mostly alluvial and flat, while eastern regions have more hills of the Bokkeveld Group with narrow alluvial deposits. The valley is framed by the high mountains of the Cape Fold Belt, with the Hex River Mountains and the Skurweberge to the northwest, the Langeberg Mountains (up to 2000m) to the north, the smaller Boland Mountains to the southwest, and the Riviersonderend Mountains to the south. It stretches from Tulbagh in the north to McGregor in the south and Rawsonville in the west to Ashton and Bonnievale in the east. Its namesake, the Breede River, flows through the broad valley as a consequent stream.

The largest town in the valley is Worcester, which lies almost in the centre of the valley, virtually equidistant from Tulbagh in the north and the other major town, Robertson to the south-east. The main north-south rail and road routes traverse the valley, including the N1 highway linking Cape Town and Johannesburg.

It is climatically diverse, however it completely falls within a Mediterranean Climate with most precipitation falling in winter (May through September). Towards the north and west, rainfall approaches upwards of 1000mm p.a., particularly in the Slanghoek Region near Rawsonville, whilst it becomes drier towards the south and west, with most areas averaging 300mm p.a., with areas near Worcester only receiving 175mm p.a. Thus Karoo Shrub dominates eastern hills (particularly the unique Robertson Karoo vegetation type) with lush Fynbos vegetation dominating western regions.

Summers can be very hot, due to its inland location, usually averaging 30 °C from December to March, but sometimes peaking near 40 °C during the hottest of days. This is due to the Du Toitskloof and Riviersonderend Mountains blocking cooling oceanic breezes from reaching the valley. During winter however, the valley is often colder than other seaward regions, like the Overberg. Snow is a regular occurrence on the surrounding mountains; snow does not fall on the valley floor, although light frost does occasionally occur. Spring and Autumn are transitional periods of variable rainfall, occasional light snow on the highest peaks and mild temperatures.
