= South African wine =

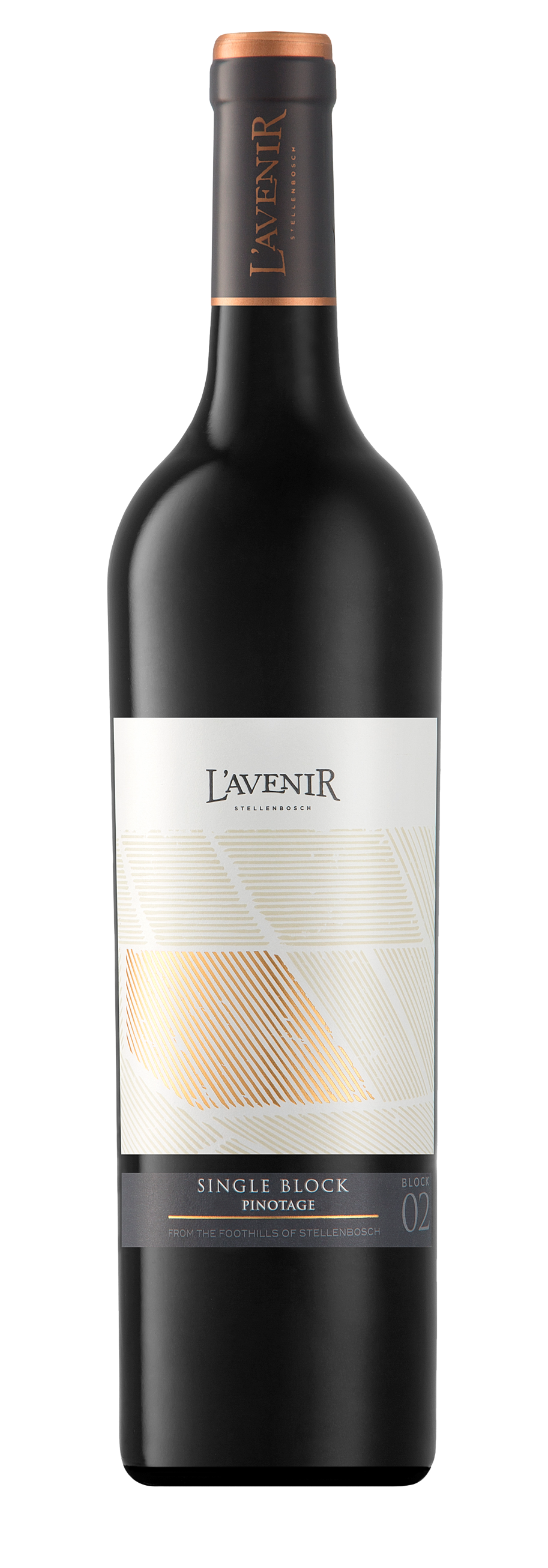
L'Avenir Wine Estate Single Block Pinotage

South African wine has a history dating back to 1659, with the first bottle being produced in Cape Town by its founder and governor Jan van Riebeeck. Access to international markets led to increased investment in South Africa's wine industry. Production is concentrated around Cape Town and almost exclusively located within the Western Cape province, with major vineyard and production centres at Constantia, Paarl, Stellenbosch and Worcester.

There are approximately 60 appellations within the Wine of Origin (WO) system, which was implemented in 1973, with a hierarchy of designated production regions, districts, and wards. Wines must only contain grapes from the specific area of origin. "Single vineyard" wines must come from a defined area of less than 6 hectares. An "Estate Wine" may be produced from adjacent farms if they are farmed together and wine is produced on-site. A ward is an area with a distinctive soil type or climate and is roughly equivalent to a European appellation.

== History ==
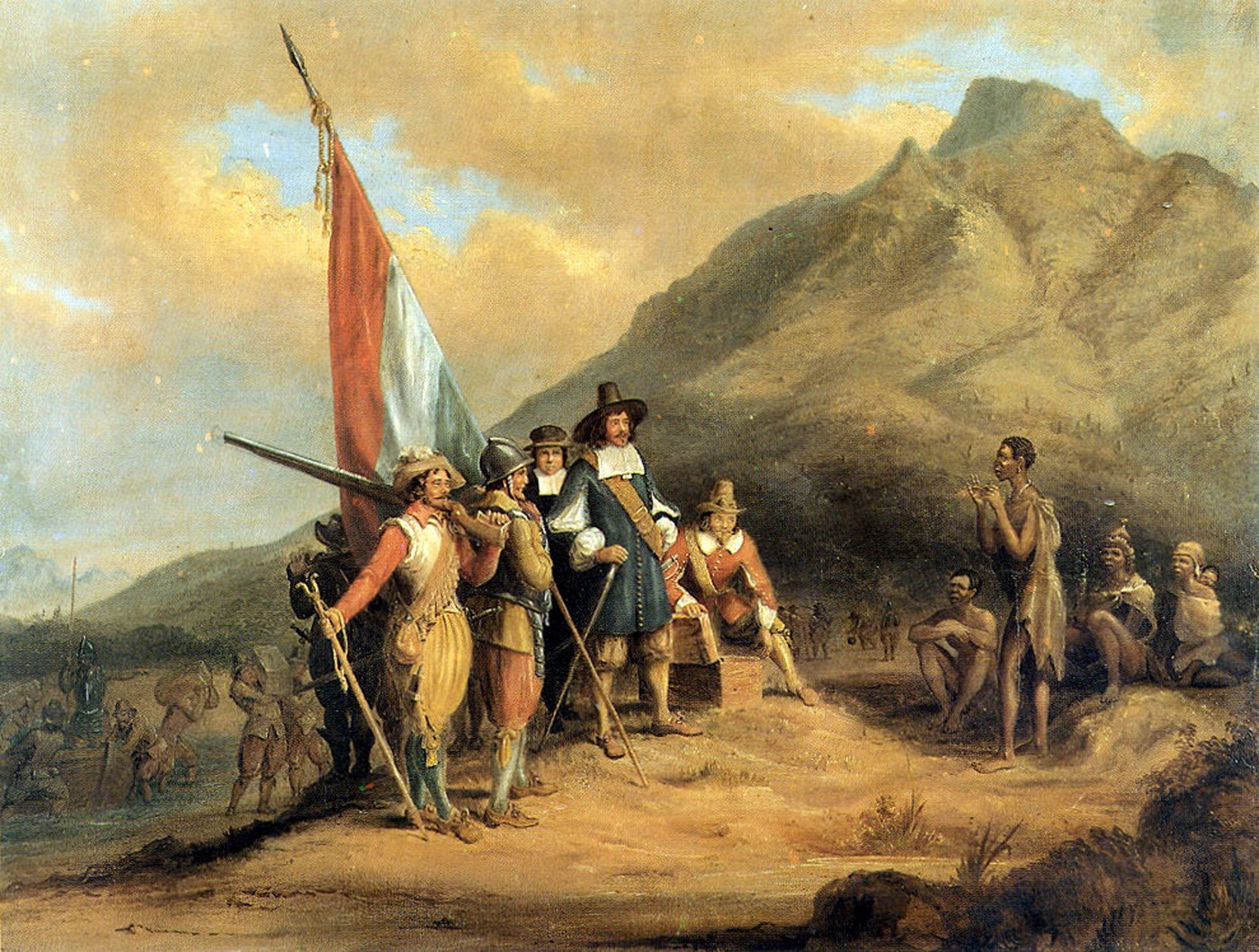
The Arrival of Jan van Riebeeck at the Cape, by Charles Bell

The roots of the South African wine industry can be traced to the explorations of the Dutch East India Company, which established a supply station in what is now Cape Town. A Dutch surgeon, Jan van Riebeeck, was assigned the task of managing the station and establishing vineyards to produce wine. This was intended to ward off scurvy amongst sailors during their voyages along the spice route to India and the East. The first harvest was made on 2 February 1659 (as noted in Van Riebeeck's log), seven years after the landing in 1652. The man succeeding Van Riebeeck as governor of the Cape of Good Hope, Simon van der Stel, sought to improve the quality of viticulture in the region. In 1685, he purchased a large 750 hectares (1,900 acres) estate just outside Cape Town, establishing the Constantia wine estate. After Van der Stel's death, the estate fell into disrepair, but was revived in 1778 when Hendrik Cloete purchased it.

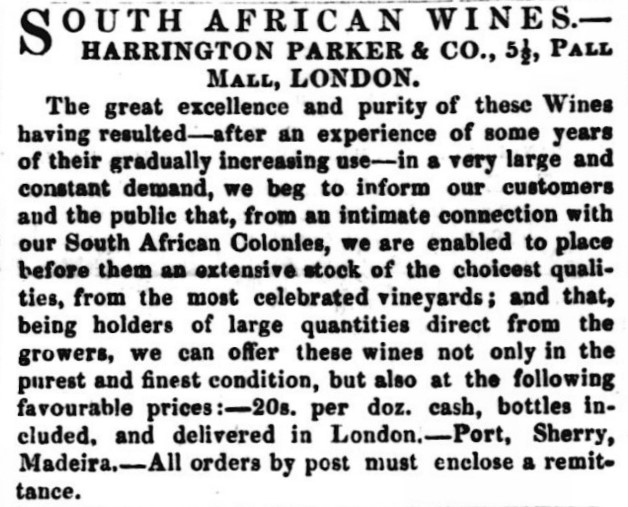
Harrington Parker & Co (Pall Mall, London) Advert for the sale of South African Wines in the UK, 1858

Many growers abandoned winemaking and instead planted orchards and alfalfa fields to feed the growing ostrich feather industry. The growers that did replant with grapevines chose high-yielding grape varieties such as Cinsaut. By the early 1900s, more than 80 million vines had been replanted, creating a wine lake. Some producers would pour unsaleable wine into local rivers and streams. The imbalance between supply and demand that caused depressed prices prompted the South African government to fund the formation of the Koöperatieve Wijnbouwers Vereniging van Zuid-Afrika Bpkt (KWV) in 1918. Started as a co-operative, the KWV soon grew in power and prominence, eventually setting policies and prices for the entire South African wine industry. To deal with the wine glut, the KWV restricted yields and set minimum prices that encouraged the production of brandy and fortified wines.

For much of the 20th century, the South African wine industry received minimal international attention. Its isolation was exacerbated by the boycotts of South African products in protest against the country's system of apartheid. It was not until the 1990s, when apartheid ended and the world's export market opened, that South African wines experienced a renaissance. Many producers in South Africa quickly adopted new viticultural and winemaking technologies. The presence of flying winemakers from abroad brought international influences and focus on well-known varieties such as Shiraz, Cabernet Sauvignon, and Chardonnay. The reorganisation of the powerful KWV co-operative into a private business spurred further innovation and improved quality. Vineyard owners and wineries who had previously relied on the price-fixing structure that bought their excess grapes for distillation were forced to become more competitive by shifting their focus to the production of quality wine. In 1990, less than 30% of all the grapes harvested were used for wine production meant for the consumer market, with the remaining 70% being distilled into brandy, sold as table grapes and juice, or discarded. By 2003, the numbers had been reversed, with more than 70% of the grapes harvested that year reaching the consumer market as wine.

In the 21st century, there has been a focus on the growing collective of black winemakers in South Africa. Several black entrepreneurs whose ancestry faced the system of apartheid rose into winemaking prominence, such as Ntsiki Biyela and Paul Siguqa.

== Climate and geography ==
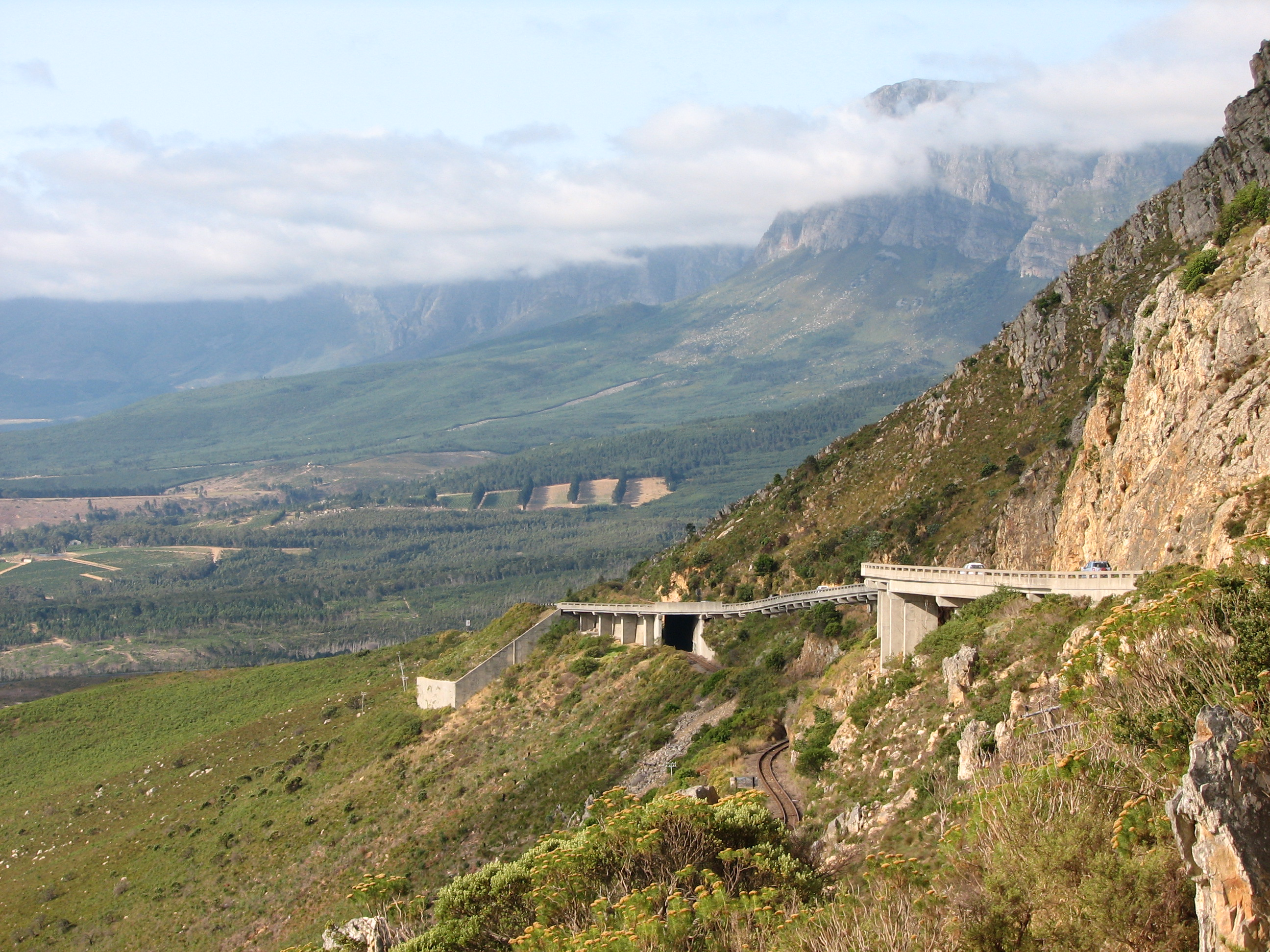
Inland mountains that are part of the Cape Fold Belt greatly influence the different macroclimates and terroir among South African wine regions.

South Africa is situated at the tip of the African continent, with most wine regions near the Atlantic and Indian Ocean coasts. These regions have a predominantly Mediterranean climate characterized by intense sunlight and arid heat. Winters are typically cold and wet, with potential snowfall at higher elevations. The threat of spring frost is rare, with most wine regions experiencing a warm growing season between November and April. The majority of annual precipitation occurs in the winter months and ranges from 250 millimetres (9.84 in) in the semi-desert-like region of Klein Karoo to 1,500 millimetres (59.06 in) near the Worcester Mountains. Regions closer to the coast, or in the rain shadow of inland mountain chains like the Drakenstein, Hottentots Holland and Langeberg, will have more rain than areas further inland. In many South African wine regions, irrigation is essential to viticulture. The Benguela current from Antarctica brings cool air off the South Atlantic coast, allowing the area's mean temperatures to be lower than those of regions of comparable latitude. A strong wind current, known as the Cape Doctor, brings gale-force winds to the wine regions in the Cape, which have the positive benefit of limiting the risk of various mildew and fungal grape disease as well as tempering humidity, but can also damage grapevines that are not protected.

During the harvest months of February and March, the average daily temperatures in many South African wine regions is 23 °C (73 °F) with spikes up to 40 °C (104 °F) not uncommon in the warm inland river valleys around the Breede, Olifants and Orange Rivers. On the Winkler scale, the majority of South African wine regions would be classified as Region III locations with heat summation and degree days similar to the California wine region of Oakville in Napa Valley. Warmer regions such as Klein Karoo and Douglas fall into Region IV (similar to Tuscany) and Region V (similar to Perth in Western Australia), respectively. New plantings are the focus in cooler climate sites in the Elgin and Walker Bay regions which are characterised as Region II with temperatures closer to the Burgundy and Piedmont.

The wine regions of South Africa are distributed across the Western and Northern Cape provinces, covering 500 kilometres (310 mi) west to east and 680 kilometres (420 mi) north-south. Within this wide expanse, a vast range of macroclimate and vineyard soil types is influenced by the area's unique geography, which includes several inland mountain chains and valleys. Within the Stellenbosch region alone, there are more than 50 unique soil types. In general, the soils of South Africa tend to retain moisture and drain well, having a significant proportion of clay (often at least 25% of the composition) with low pH levels around 4. The pH levels of the soils are often adjusted with lime and calcium treatment. Other soil types found in South Africa include granite and sandstone in Constantia, shale in Elgin and arenaceous shale in Walker Bay. Near the river valleys, the soils are particularly lime rich with a high proportion of sand and shale.

== Statistics ==
South Africa is the eighth-largest wine producer in the world and the sixth-largest exporter of wine. South Africa exports R10.3 billion (approximately US$600 million) in wine annually. In 2015, the country's vineyard footprint was 98,594 hectares. This reduced to 86,525 by 2025. As of 2022, a total of 90,512 hectares of land was used for wine grape cultivation by 2,613 wine grape producers for 536 cellars; the industry employed 269,096 people. The country produced 1.13 billion liters of wine annually, of which 81% was consumed domestically. In 2019, the wine industry's contribution to the national economy was R55 billion.

== Wine of Origin ==
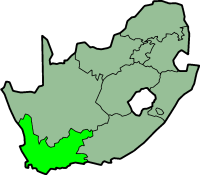
Although the majority of South Africa's wine regions lie in the Western Cape, recent pioneering efforts have included the Eastern Cape and KwaZulu-Natal as wine regions.

Drafted in 1973, the "Wine of Origin" (WO) programme regulates how wine regions in South Africa are defined and may appear on wine labels. While some aspects of the WO are taken from the French Appellation d'Origine Contrôlée (AOC) system, the WO is concerned primarily with accuracy in labelling and does not place any additional regulations on wine regions such as permitted varieties, trellising methods, irrigation and crop yields. Wine regions under the WO system fall under one of four categories – the largest and most generic are geographical units (such as the Western Cape region) which include the smaller, but still largely defined regions (such as Overberg), followed by districts (like Walker Bay) and then finally wards (such as Elgin). The Eastern Cape province is South Africa's most recent wine region. While political boundaries largely define geographical units, regions, and districts, wards are the level of origin designation that is most defined by unique terroir characteristics.

== Wine regions ==
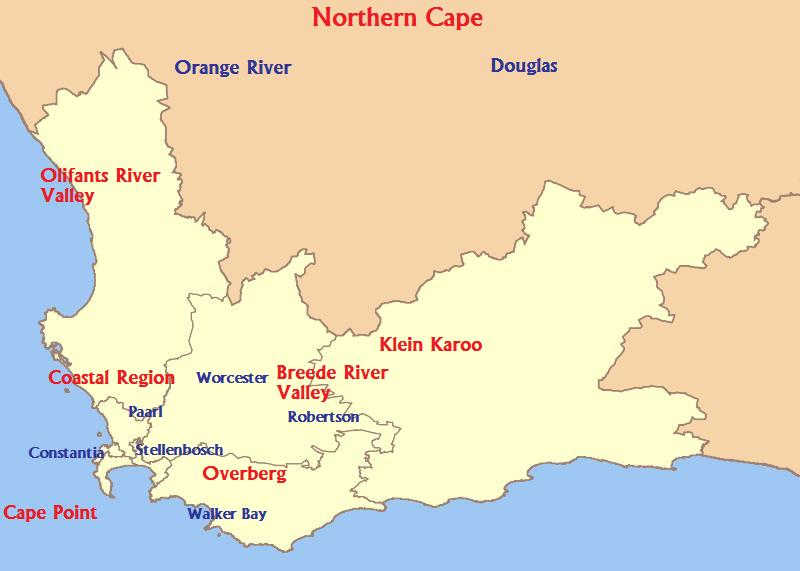
General location of some South African wine regions

As of 2003, South Africa ranked 17th by area planted with vines, with 1.5% of the world's grape vineyards covering 110,000 hectares (270,000 acres). Yearly production across South Africa's wine regions is typically around 10 million hL (264 million US gallons), placing the country among the top ten wine-producing countries in the world. The majority of wine production in South Africa occurs in the Cape, particularly in the south-western corner near the coast. The historical heart of South African wine has been the area near the Cape Peninsula and modern-day Cape Town. This area remains prominent in the industry, being home to the major wine regions of Constantia, Stellenbosch, and Paarl. Today, wine is produced throughout the Western Cape and in parts of the Northern Cape, KwaZulu-Natal, and Eastern Cape. The river regions along the Breede Valley, Olifants, and Orange Rivers are among the warmest areas and are often the location of bulk wine production and distillation. The cooler-climate regions east of Cape Town along the Indian Ocean coast, such as Walker Bay and Elgin, have experienced substantial expansion and development in recent years as producers experiment with cool-climate varietals and wine styles.

Below are some notable Wine of Origins districts.

=== Constantia ===
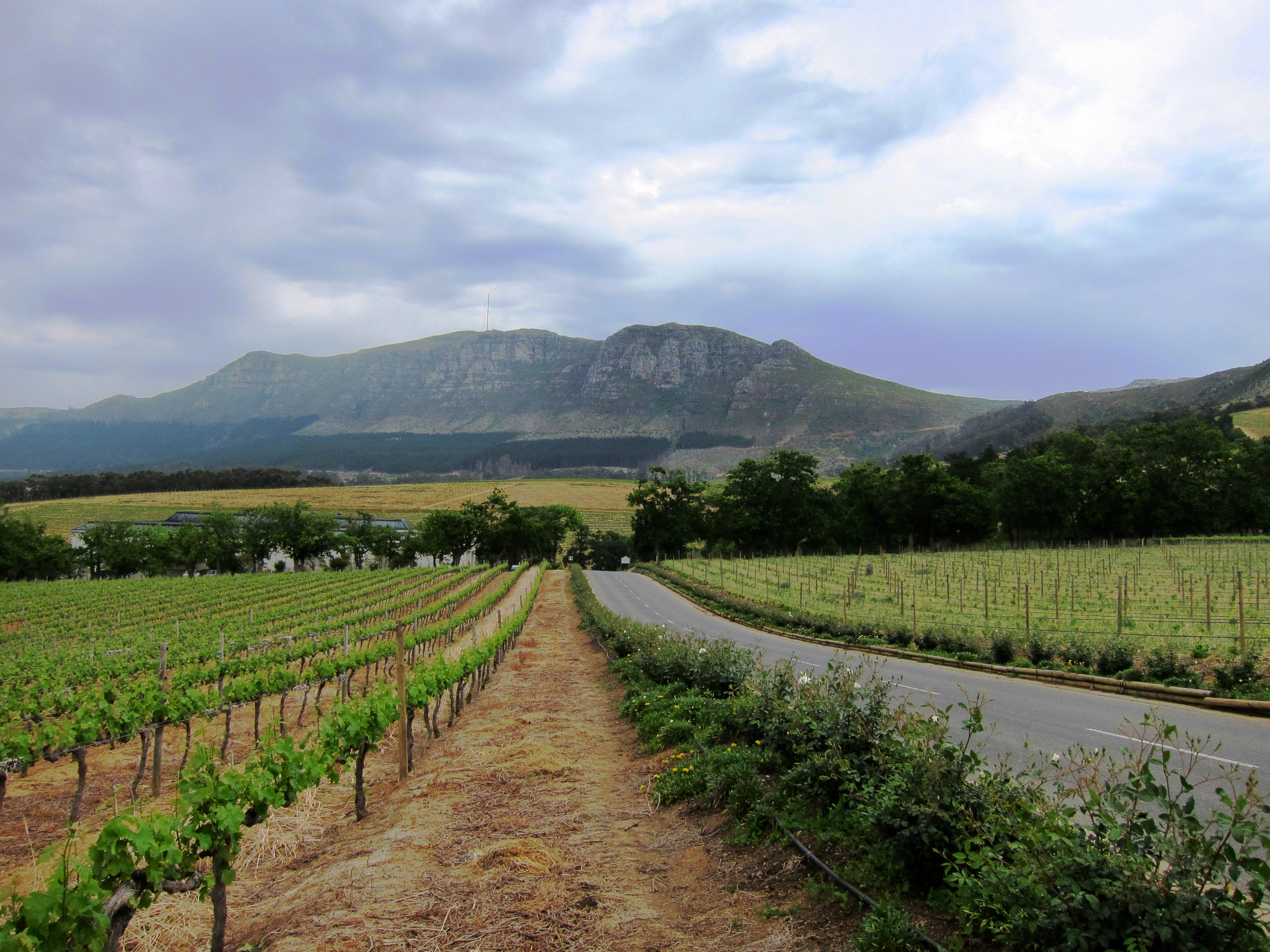
Groot Constantia, the oldest wine estate in South Africa

The Constantia Valley is located south of Cape Town on the Cape Peninsula, which juts into the Atlantic Ocean. Because of its location, the region is influenced on both sides by oceanic conditions, which create a cooling effect that contributes to a long, slow ripening period in summer, during which average daily temperatures fall between 18–19 °C (64–66 °F). Winters are often mild and moderate, but wet, with annual precipitation typically exceeding 1,000 millimetres (39.37 in). The soil of the region is composed primarily of Table Mountain sandstone with high concentrations of loam and granite. The area grows a wide range of grapes with Sauvignon blanc being particularly noted. The area is now home to 11 wine farms (Andrews, 2017). It is the country's oldest winegrowing region, with Groot Constantia as the oldest wine estate. Another well-known name in the region is Klein Constantia, established in 1685 by the VOC Governor of the Cape, Simon van der Stel. Their fame reached its peak when Napoleon Bonaparte ordered as much as 1,126 liters (297 gallons) of Constantia wine "Vin de Constance" shipped in wooden casks each year to Longwood House, his home in exile on St Helena from 1815 until he died in 1821.

=== Stellenbosch ===
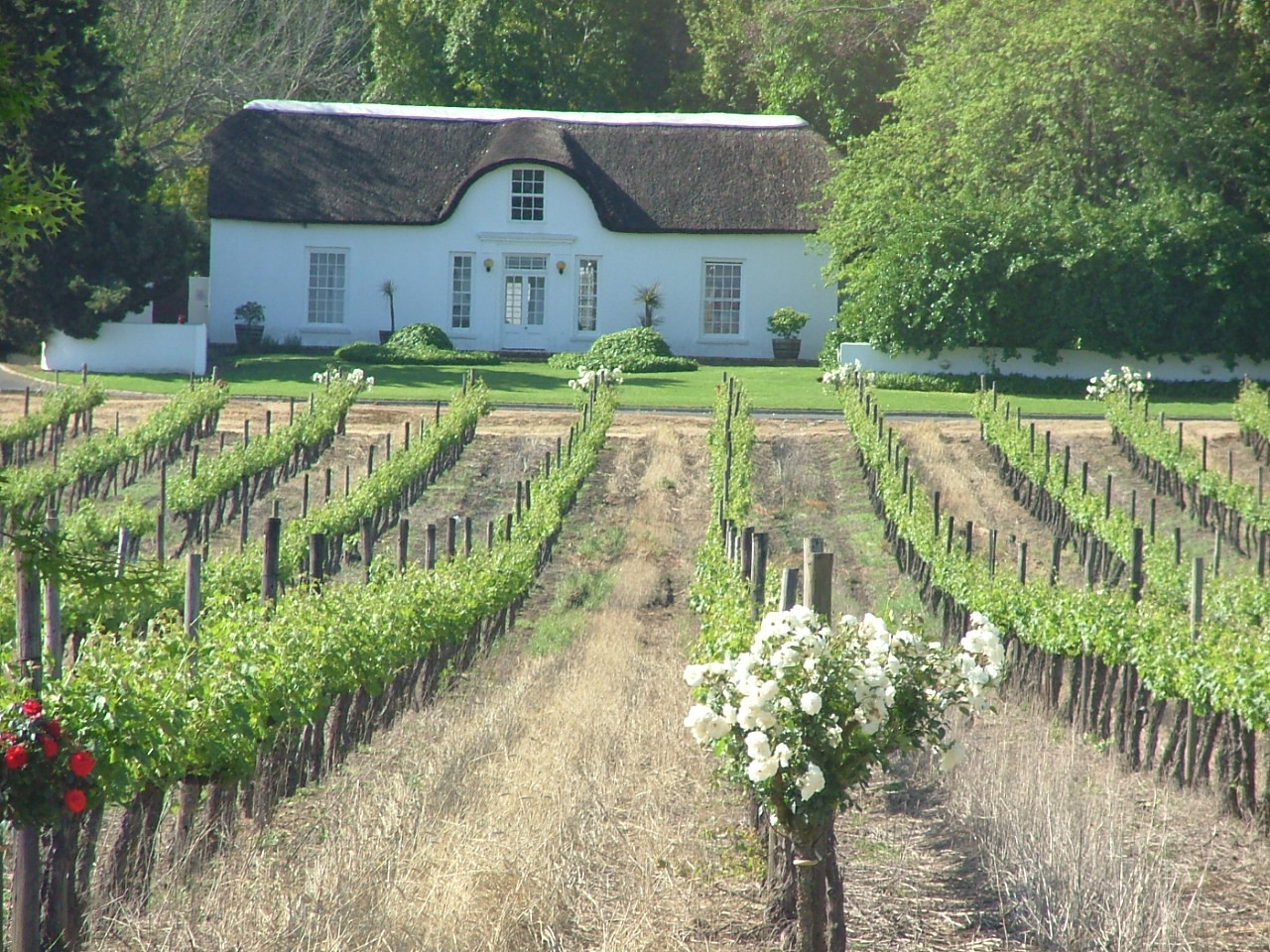
A vineyard in Stellenbosch

The Stellenbosch district is the second-oldest wine region in South Africa, after Constantia, and accounts for approximately 14% of the country's annual wine production. First planted in 1679, Stellenbosch is located 45 kilometres (28 mi) east of Cape Town. The region is surrounded by the Helderberg, Simonsberg, and Stellenbosch Mountains and is influenced by climatic conditions from nearby False Bay. The bay tempers the climate and keeps average temperatures during the summer growing season to around 20 °C (68 °F), just slightly warmer than Bordeaux. Vineyard soil types range from decomposed granite on the hillside near the mountains to sandy, alluvial loam in the valleys near the rivers.

The seven wards of Stellenbosch-Banghoek, Bottelary, Devon Valley, Jonkershoek Valley, Papegaaiberg, Polkadraai Hills and Simonsberg-Stellenbosch – are well known for their red wine production that demonstrate terroir distinction – particularly Cabernet Sauvignon, Merlot, Pinotage and Shiraz. Simonsberg was the first wine ward to gain individual distinction—white wine production centres on Chardonnay and Sauvignon blanc, which are often blended. The western reaches of Stellenbosch, such as Bottelary and near Elsenburg, also include a sizeable portion of Chenin blanc plantings in areas with light, sandy soils.

=== Paarl ===
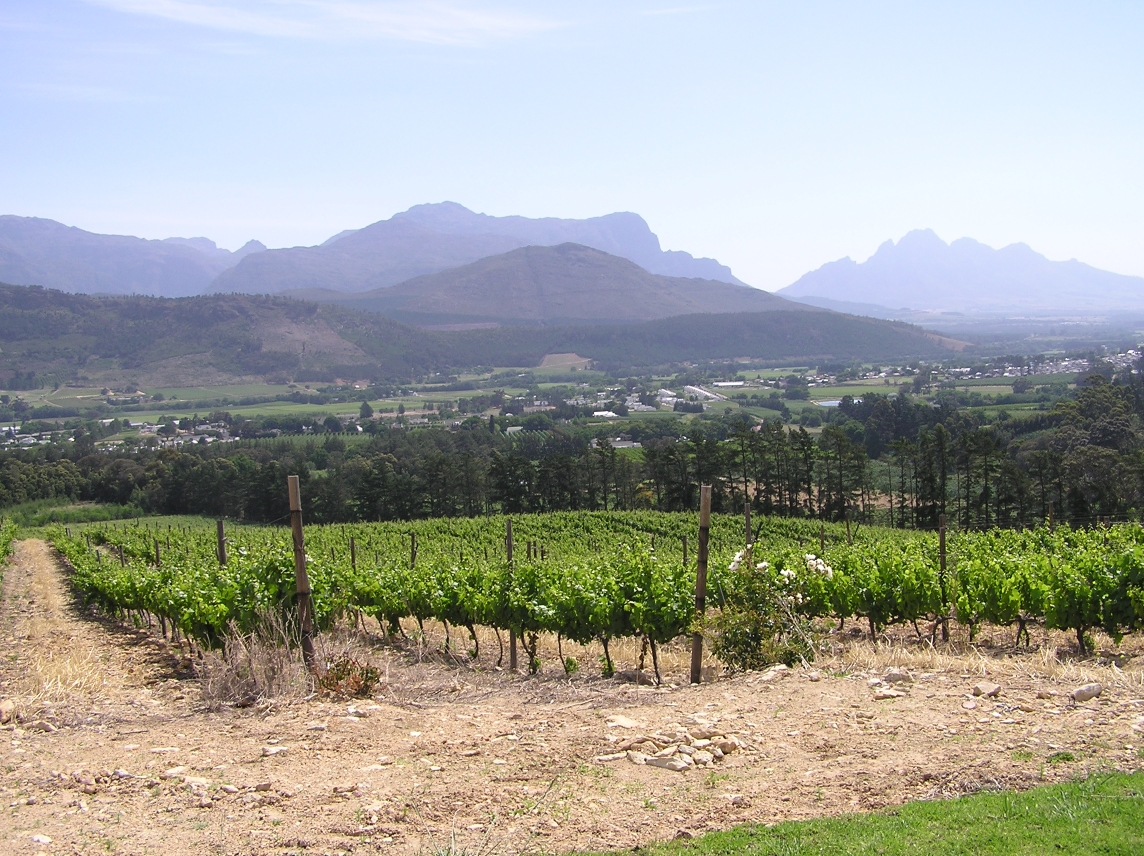
Vineyard in the Paarl ward of Franschhoek

For most of the 20th century, Paarl was for all practical purposes the heart of the South African wine industry. It was the home of the KWV as well as the annual Nederburg Wine Auction where the reputation of a vintage or an estate could be established. Gradually, the focus shifted southward to Stellenbosch, where Stellenbosch University assumed a more prominent role in the South African wine industry through its viticulture and winemaking programmes. The transfer of power from the KWV to a private business further shifted the focus away from Paarl. However, the terroir driven wines of its wards, the Franschhoek Valley and Wellington, have revitalised interest in the area in recent years.

The fortified wine produced in Paarl and nearby Tulbagh can be designated with the unique WO of Boberg relating to its proximity to the Berg River. This was repealed in 2019 and is no longer an approved label designation.

==== Franschhoek Valley ====
The Franschhoek Valley was founded by Huguenot settlers who brought with them from their native France their traditions and winemaking expertise. The ward includes some higher-elevation vineyard sites that can produce full-flavoured white wines with noticeable acidity.

Franschhoek will soon become South Africa's first wine region to establish a classification system (Appellation Grand Prestige) for its wines, with Sémillon, Chardonnay, and Cabernet Sauvignon identified as the area's most widely cultivated grapes over several decades.

=== Breede River Valley ===
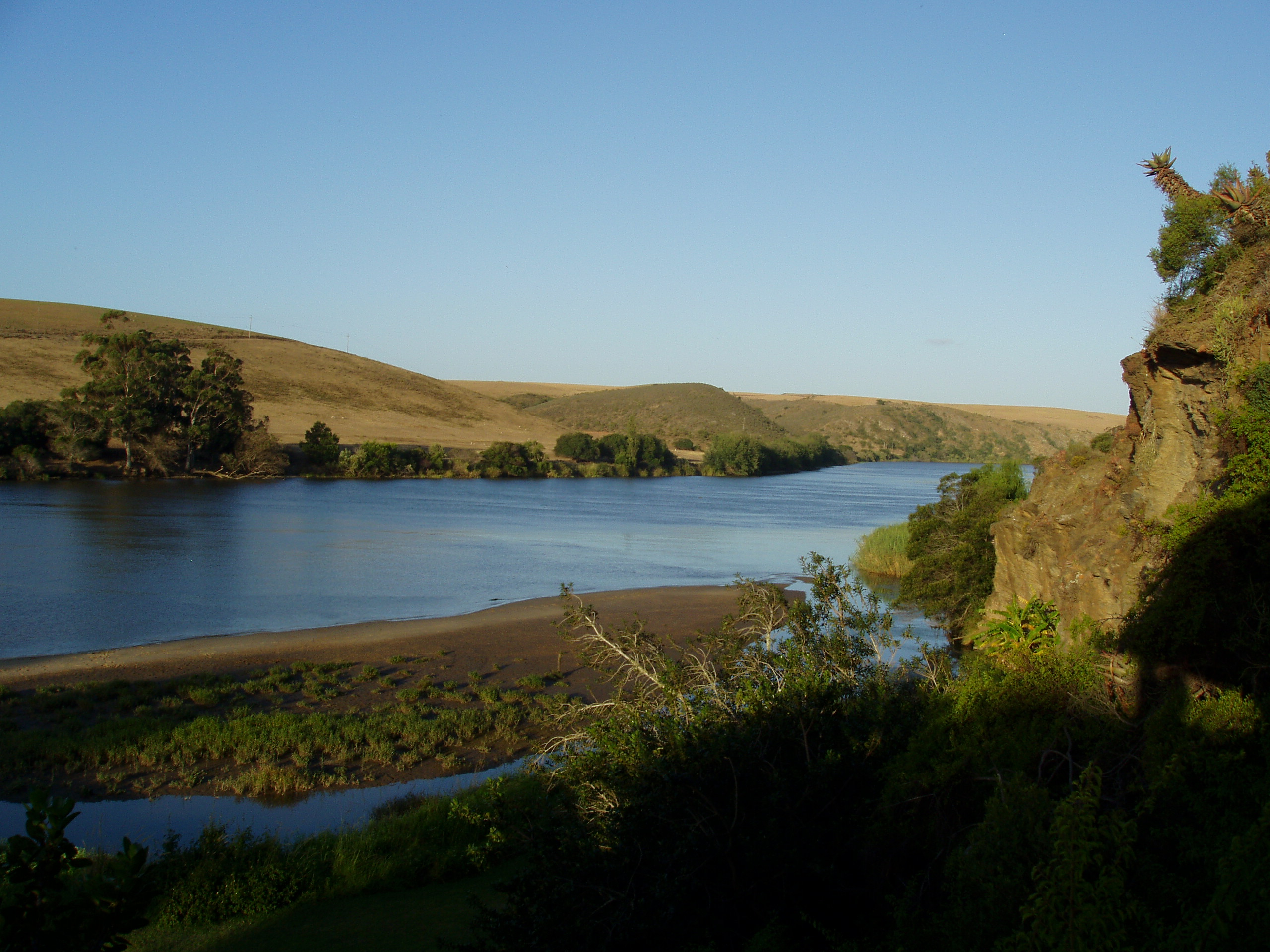
The Breede River provides vital irrigation for the Worcester and Robertson wine regions.

The Breede River Valley, located east of the Drakenstein Mountains, is a warm climate region that can be very dry and arid in some places. The river itself provides easy access to irrigation, which makes bulk wine production of high-yielding varieties commonplace. The Robertson district is located closest to the river, along alluvial soils and the occasional calcium-rich outcrop. The average annual precipitation is generally below 400 millimetres (15.75 in), necessitating irrigation. Temperatures during the summer growing season are normally around 22 °C (72 °F). The Bonnievale ward is the most notable sub-region of Robertson, noted for its Chardonnay and Shiraz wines.

The Worcester district is responsible for more wine than any other wine region in the country, with one-fifth to one-quarter of South Africa's annual wine production coming from this area. Located just beyond Du Toit's Peak in the Breede River Valley, Worcester includes a broad fertile plain that relies on irrigation due to its dry, arid climate. The area's large and numerous co-operatives produce sizeable amounts of fortified wine as well as Muscadel and Hanepoot based dessert wines. In recent years, the Slanghoek ward and the Breedekloof district have been successful in growing botrytised and dry Sauvignon blanc wines. The Worcester district is home to nearly half of all Sémillon and a third of Ruby Cabernet, planted in South Africa, with sizeable plantings of Colombard and Chenin blanc.

=== Overberg ===
The cool climate Overberg region has been the site of the most recent interest and development in the South African wine industry, particularly with increased plantings of Chardonnay and Pinot noir. The entire area received very little attention until the late 20th century and was not even classified in 1973 within the original Wine of Origins programme. The maritime climate of Walker Bay and the cool, higher elevation vineyards of Elgin located east of Cape Town, have had success producing these varietals as well as Sauvignon blanc.

=== Other notable regions ===
The Klein Karoo region (meaning Little Karoo) has a semi-desert climate and was known mostly for sheep and ostrich farming. The region stretches from Montagu in the west to the village of De Rust in the east. In Calitzdorp, warm temperatures are moderated by sea breezes that begin in the late afternoon and by cool nighttime temperatures. Wine production in the area is largely centred on fortified "port-style" wine and Muscadels.

The Atlantic-influenced West Coast region includes the winemaking areas of Durbanville, the Olifants River, Piketberg, and the Swartland. While this region was known historically for its large, bulk wine production, in recent years, producers have focused on premium wine production such as plantings of Sauvignon blanc in the Groenekloof area near Darling and Pinotage in unirrigated farmland of the Swartland. In the Olifants River region, Chenin blanc and Colombard are popular. The area is also home to South Africa's biggest single co-operative winery – the Vredendal Co-operative.

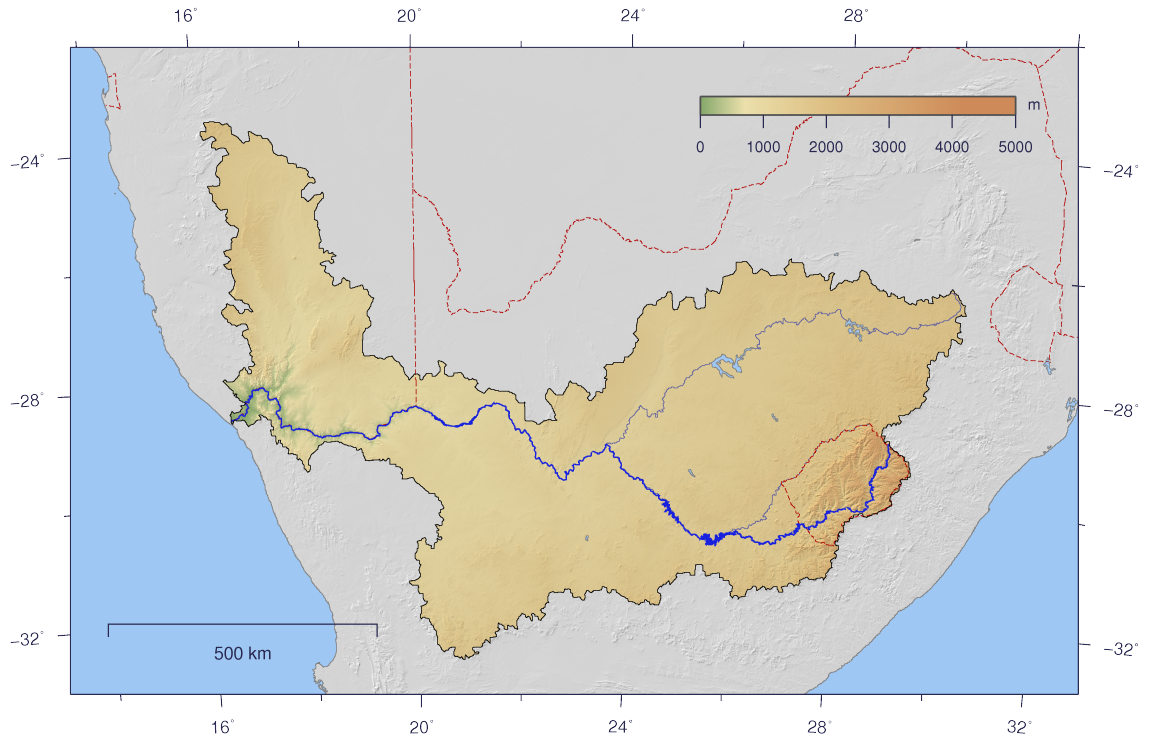
Wine regions within the Orange river watershed include the hottest wine producing areas in South Africa.

The Northern Cape wine regions along the Orange River are among the hottest wine-producing areas in South Africa. Wine production here was slow to take root, not until the 1960s, when better irrigation and temperature-controlled fermentation technology became available. Today, the area is responsible for nearly 12% of all the wine produced in South Africa – mostly by large co-operatives for bulk wine production. The Hartswater region, located 80 kilometres (50 mi) north of Kimberley, is South Africa's northernmost wine region.

KwaZulu-Natal was designated as a Geographical Unit in 2005 and is one of South Africa's most recent wine regions. The first wine estate in this region was The Stables Wine Estate, and the region's first Wine of Origin wine was released by Tiny and Judy van Niekerk in July 2006. The Stables Wine Estate went bankrupt in 2012. Current cultivars doing well in the growing wine region of KwaZulu-Natal are: Sauvignon Blanc, Pinotage, Pinot Noir, and Chardonnay. With mild summer temperatures, the region boasts South Africa's coolest vineyards.

The Eastern Cape followed soon after through the pioneering efforts of Ronnie and Janet Vehorn. In 2009, Harrison Hope Wine Estate was registered as the first wine estate in the Eastern Cape province of South Africa. The estate made history again with its 2009 Merlot becoming the first certified estate wine ever produced in the Eastern Cape region. Situated in the Amatola Mountains, this area enjoys high temperatures in summer with little to no humidity. Unfortunately, late frost, hail, summer rainfall, and duiker make for some of the harshest conditions for wine grapes. Grapes grown in this region include: Chardonnay, Merlot, Petit Verdot, Pinotage, Sauvignon Blanc, and Shiraz.

=== Other notable wards ===
The Ruiterbosch ward, located southwest of the Klein Karoo around Mossel Bay, has a generally cool climate influenced primarily by the Indian Ocean. The area is planted largely with Riesling, Sauvignon blanc, and Pinot noir. The Cederberg located east of the southern reaches of the Olifants rivers includes some of the highest elevated vineyards in South Africa, planted at altitudes more than 1,000 metres (3,300 ft).

== Viticulture ==
Historically, vineyards in South Africa were planted with untrellised bush vines planted 1.2 metres (3 ft 11 in) apart at a density of 7,000 vines per hectare (2,800 vines per acre). Following the phylloxera devastation, the focus of viticulture in South Africa shifted toward quantity rather than quality. Vineyards were planted with high-yielding varieties, widely spaced to facilitate the use of mechanical harvesting. In the late 20th century, more producers focused on high-quality wine production and adopted modern viticultural practices. Vines were planted to an average density of 3,300 per hectare (1,300 per acre) and pruned to keep yields down to 49–56 hl/ha (2.8–3.2 tons/acre). The most common form of trellising in South Africa is the vertical hedge row system, which uses a split cordon supported on a wire kept approximately 0.75 metres (2.5 ft) off the ground. The grapevine leaves are trained upright on separate wires that allow plenty of sunshine to reach the grapes, but provide enough coverage to keep them from being sunburned. The vines are usually pruned to yield four to five spurs on each cordon, each with two to three buds (potential grape clusters). Heat is also a concern come harvest time with some wineries harvesting only at night in the cooler temperatures under floodlights.

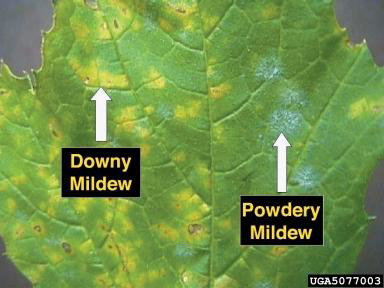
Both downy and powdery mildew can present an occasional viticultural threat to South African vineyards.

The lack of precipitation in many wine regions necessitates irrigation. Sprinkler and drip irrigation systems are used to provide anywhere from 200–700 millimetres (7.9–27.6 in) of extra water a year. Modern winemakers are developing new techniques and an understanding of the role that water stress plays in the production of high-quality wine grapes. Producers who do not irrigate will sometimes use the phrase "dryland" or "dry farmed" on their wine labels as a marketing angle. Besides irrigation, an important concern for vineyard owners is the threat of vineyard pests such as mealy bugs and baboons. To combat these hazards, some vineyard owners will utilise Integrated Pest Management (IPM) programmes such as the importation of ladybugs, a natural predator of mealy bugs.

While ocean winds keep some fungus and mildew threats at bay, downy mildew and powdery mildew (known regionally as "white rust") can pose an occasional threat during the wet winter season. Near harvest time, botrytis can also appear, being a hazard or a welcome visitor depending on whether or not botrytised wine production is the goal. Another threat is diseased and virus-infected rootstock. After the phylloxera devastation, vineyards in South Africa were replanted with American rootstock (nowadays most commonly 99 Richter, 110 Richter, and 101-14 Mgt). Some of these imported rootstocks were infected with various viruses such as corky bark, fanleaf, and leafroll, which soon spread to other vineyards. These virus-infected vines have a shortened lifespan and difficulties with photosynthesis, which can lead to poor ripening of phenolic compounds in the grape and low-quality wine. Since the 1980s, efforts have been undertaken by the South African wine industry to quarantine and promote healthy, virus-free vineyards. Additionally, work has been undertaken in clonal research to identify which grape varieties grow best in which climate and wine region.

=== Vine Improvement Programme ===
Following the end of apartheid and the opening of export markets, the South African wine industry faced a substantial learning curve to remain competitive in the global wine market. The Vine Improvement Programme (VIP) was established to bring modern viticultural understanding to the industry. The first phase, launched in the late 20th century, focused on virus-free, yield-controlling rootstocks and clonal research. The ongoing second phase focuses on matching combinations of grape varieties, clones, and rootstocks to specific terroirs capable of producing high-quality wine. Over the last 20+ years, the work of the VIP has brought the South African wine industry to the forefront of viticultural advances.

== Winemaking and wines ==
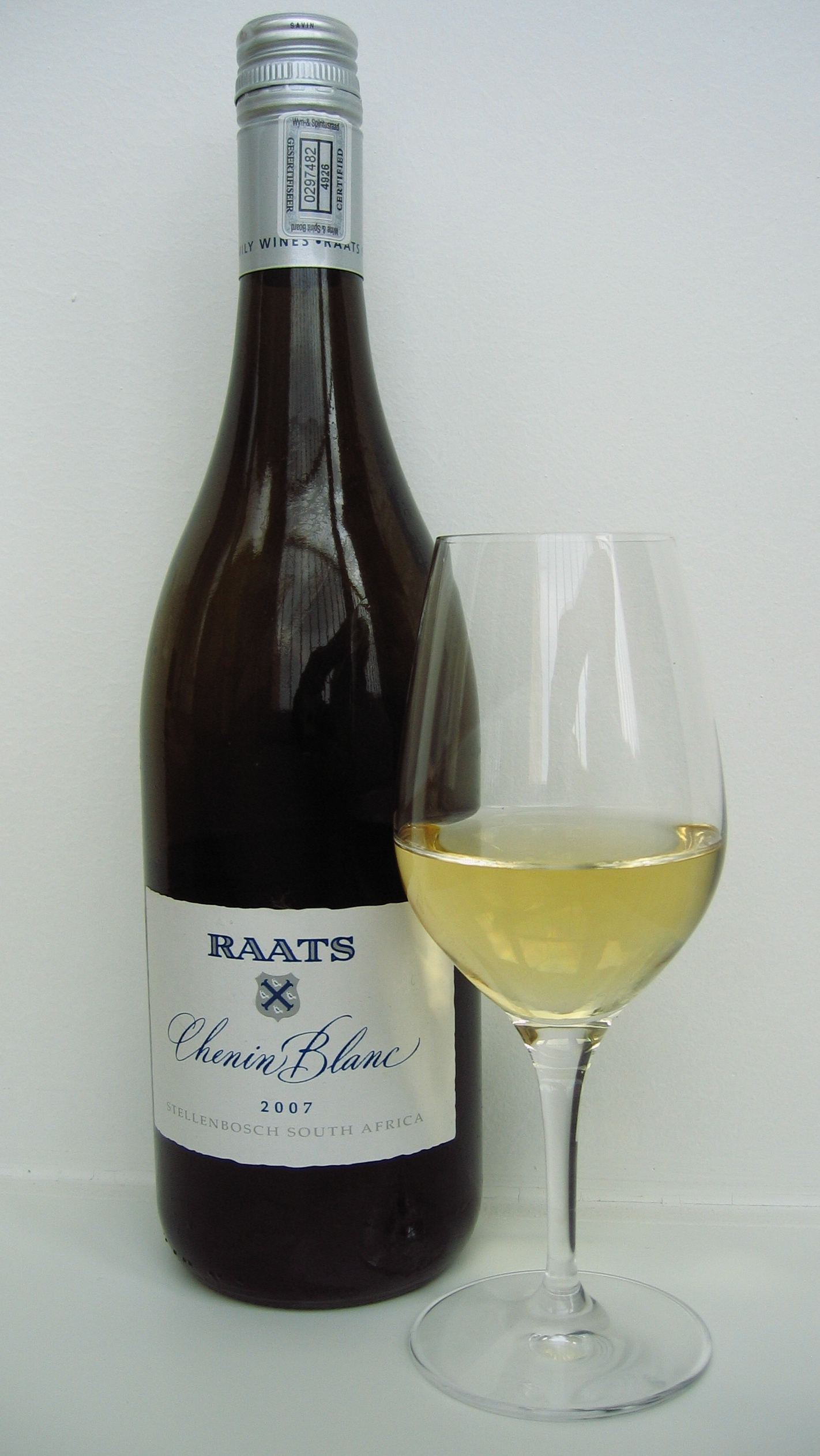
An oaked white wine from Stellenbosch produced from Chenin Blanc.

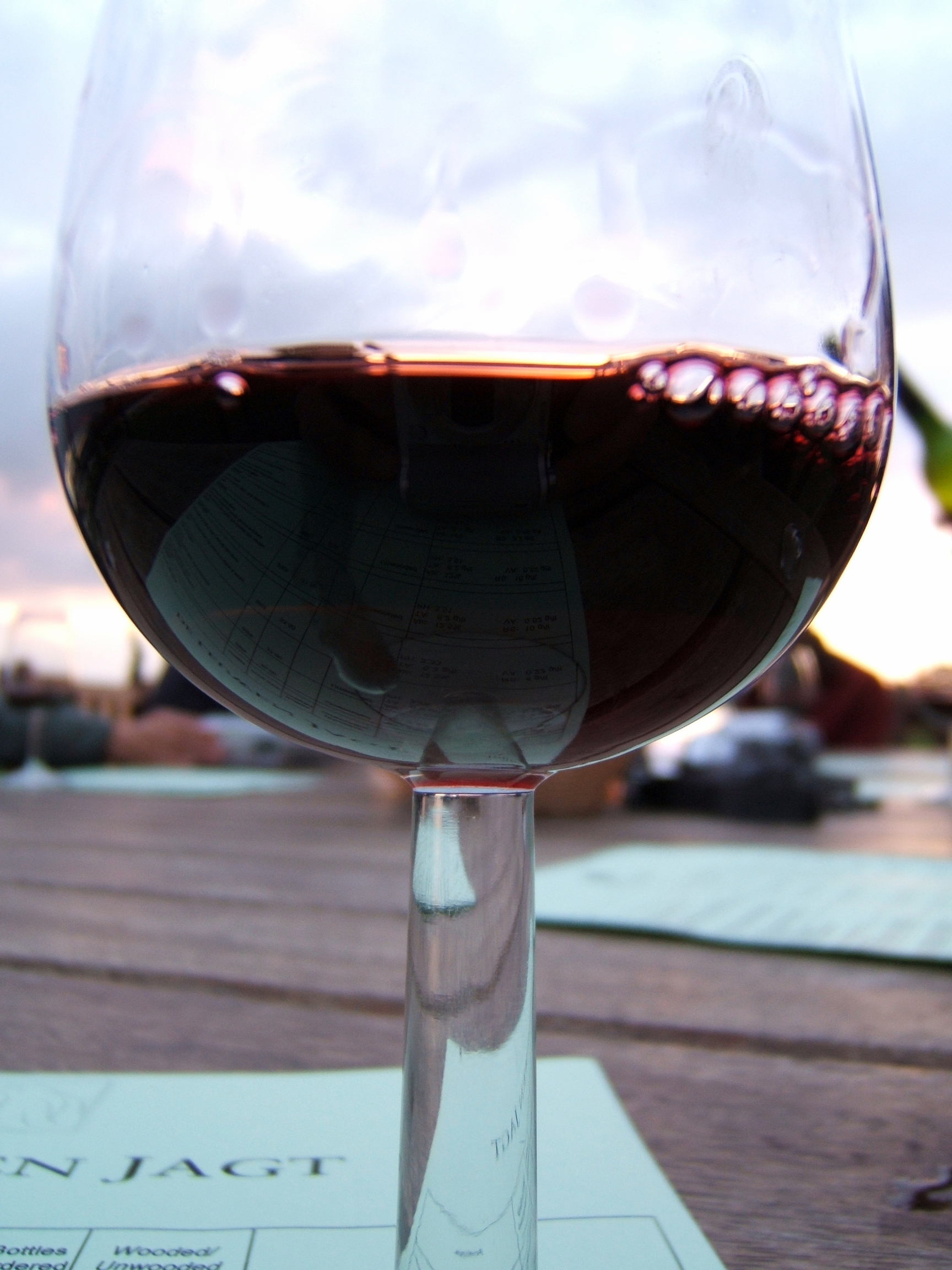
Since the end of the 20th century, more South African winemakers have been focused on improving the quality of red wines.

The winemaking traditions of South Africa often represent a hybridisation of Old World wine making and the new. Since the end of apartheid, many producers have been working to produce more "international" styles of wine that can succeed in the world market. Flying winemakers from France, Spain, and California have brought new techniques and styles to South Africa. In the 1980s, the use of oak barrels for fermentation and ageing became popular. The use of chaptalisation is illegal in South Africa as the country's warm climate makes attaining sufficient sugar and alcohol levels for wine production non-problematic. Winemakers more often encounter low acidity levels that require supplementation with additional acids, such as tartaric acid.

Today, the focus of the South African wine industry is on increasing the quality of wine production, particularly with the more exportable and fashionable red grape varieties. Traditionally, South African red wines were known for being coarse-textured and rustic-flavoured. The Afrikaans word dikvoet, used to describe these wines, literally means "thick foot". In the vineyards, growers focused on yield control to improve ripeness, while winemakers employed modern techniques to produce softer, fleshier wines. Temperature control fermentation as well as controlled malolactic fermentation were more widely used, as well as less dependency on filtration as a means of stabilisation.

=== Cape port-style wine ===
The South African wine industry has a long history of fortified wine production producing wines known colloquially as "Cape port" (though the term "Port" is protected by the European Union and refers only to the wines from the Douro region of Portugal). These wines are made from a variety of grapes, including Shiraz and Pinotage, as well as Portuguese varieties such as Tinta Barroca, Touriga Nacional, Souzão, and Fernão Pires. The minimum alcohol level for these wines must be 16.5–22%. The many styles of "Cape port" closely parallel their Portuguese counterparts and include:

- Cape White port – Can be made from any white grape varieties (such as Chenin blanc, Colombard, or Fernão Pires) except for Muscats, and required to be aged in wood barrels for at least six months.
- Cape Ruby port – Usually a blend of several fruity, full-bodied wines that have been aged for at least six months in wood for each wine and at least a year total for the entire blend.
- Cape Tawny port – A blend that has been aged in wood long enough to acquire a tawny colour with a smooth, slightly nutty flavour. Blending Ruby and White ports to create Tawny port is prohibited.
- Cape Late Bottled Vintage (LBV) port – A wine composed of grapes harvested in a single vintage that is aged at least two years in oak and three to six years total before being bottled. South African wine laws require that the term "Late Bottled Vintage" or "LBV" appear on the wine label along with the vintage and bottling year.
- Cape Vintage Port – A wine composed of grapes harvested in a single vintage, aged in wood, and released with the words "Vintage Port" and the vintage year on the label.
- Cape Vintage Reserve port – A wine produced in a vintage year recognised by the South African wine industry or trade publications as being of exceptional quality. The wine must be aged for at least one year in oak and sold exclusively in glass wine bottles. The words "Vintage Reserve Port" and vintage date must appear on the wine label.

=== Other fortified and dessert wines ===
In addition to port-style wine, South African wine makers also produce "sherry-style" wines produced in a solera system and a unique vin de liqueur made from Muscat known as Jerepigo (or Jerepiko). With Jerepigo, the brandy is added to the must before fermentation, which leaves the wine with a residual sugar (RS) level of at least 160 grams per litre. South Africa's long history of late harvest dessert wines includes the modern-day Edel Laat-oes, which are affected by noble rot (known locally as Edelkeur) and contain at least 50 grams of residual sugar per litre. Wine labelled simply as Laat-oes is from grapes harvested late but not infected with botrytis. These wines must have an alcohol content of at least 10% and a residual sugar level between 10 and 30 grams per litre. Wines above 30 grams RS may be called Spesiale Laat-oes or "special late harvest", which may imply that some grapes infected with botrytis were used.

=== Sparkling wines ===
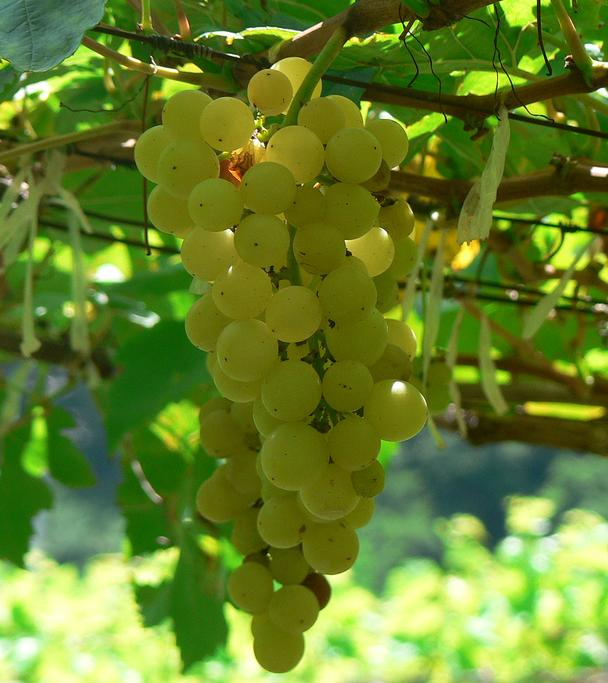
Though more producers are turning to Chardonnay and Pinot noir, Chenin blanc (or Steen as it is also known) is still frequently found in South African sparkling wines.

Sparkling wines in South Africa are produced with both the Charmat and the traditional "Champagne Method". The first Champagne method wines produced in South Africa came from the Simonsig estate (in Stellenbosch) in 1971. To distinguish South African sparkling wines (and to comply with European Union regulations protecting the term "Champagne" and champenois), wines made in this traditional bottled fermented method are labelled as Methode Cap Classique (or MCC). These wines have traditionally been made using Sauvignon blanc and Chenin blanc, but in recent years have increasingly used the traditional "Champagne grapes" of Chardonnay, Pinot Noir, and Pinot Meunier. Red sparkling wine made from Pinotage is also available.

=== Labelling laws ===
South African labelling law focuses primarily on geographical origins and falls within the purview of the Wine of Origin legislation. Single vineyard designated wine can be produced, provided the vineyard is registered with the government, and all grapes used in the production of the wine were grown in that vineyard. While the term "estate" no longer qualifies as a designation of geographic origin, wineries may still label "estate wines" provided that all grapes were grown. The wine was vinified and bottled on the same property. The South African Wine & Spirit Board operates a voluntary programme that allows South African wines to be "certified" for quality and accuracy in labelling. Under this certification process, vintage dated wine must be composed of at least 85% grapes that were harvested in that vintage year. Varietal wines must also be composed of at least 85% of the listed varietal. Blends, such as a Cabernet Sauvignon-Pinotage blend, may list both varietals on the label, provided that the two wines were vinified separately. A wine that has been "co-fermented", with both grapes crushed and vinified together, such as a Shiraz-Viognier, cannot list both varietals. As of 2006, about 35% of Cape wineries participated in this voluntary programme.

== Grape varieties ==
| Grape | Vineyards |
|---|---|
| Chenin Blanc | 18.2% |
| Cabernet Sauvignon | 11.3% |
| Colombard | 12.0% |
| Shiraz | 10.5% |
| Sauvignon Blanc | 9.4% |
| Chardonnay | 8.0% |
| Pinotage | 7.5% |
| Merlot | 6.0% |

Grape varieties in South Africa are known as cultivar, with many common international varieties developing local synonyms that still have a strong tradition of use. These include: Chenin blanc (Steen), Riesling (until recently known locally as Weisser Riesling), Crouchen (known as Cape Riesling), Palomino (the grape of the Spanish wine Sherry known locally as "White French"), Trebbiano (Ugni Blanc), Sémillon (Groendruif) and Muscat of Alexandria (Hanepoot). However, wines that are often exported overseas will usually have the more internationally recognised name appear on the wine label. In 2015, SAWIS (South African Wine Information and Systems) reported that the country had 100,146 hectares of vineyards, with about 55% planted with white varieties. Chenin blanc has long been the most widely planted variety, still accounting for over 18% of all grape area planted in South Africa as of 2015, though it is slowly decreasing in overall share of vineyard area. In the 1980s and 1990s, interest in international varieties led to increased plantings of Chardonnay and Sauvignon blanc. Other white grape varieties with significant plantings include Colombard (also spelled locally as Colombar), Cape Riesling, Gewürztraminer, Hanepoot, Muscat Blanc à Petits Grains, Riesling, and Sémillon. Both red and white mutants of Muscat Blanc à Petits Grains, as well as Chenel and Weldra, two Chenin blanc-Ugni blanc crossings, are used for brandy distillation and fortified wine production.

Since the 1990s, plantings of red grape varieties have risen steadily. In the late 1990s, less than 18% of all the grapes grown in South Africa were red. By 2009, that number had risen to 44%. For most of the 20th century, the high-yielding Cinsaut was the most widely planted red grape variety, but the shift in focus to quality wine production has seen plantings of the grape steadily decline, so that it represented just 2% of all South African vineyards in 2009. In its place, Cabernet Sauvignon, Shiraz and Pinotage have risen to prominence with Cabernet Sauvignon being the most widely grown red grape variety covering 12% of all plantings in 2009. Other red grape varieties found in South Africa include: Carignan, Gamay (often made in the style of Beaujolais wine with carbonic maceration), Grenache, Petit Verdot, Cabernet Franc, Pontac, Ruby Cabernet, Tinta Barroca and Zinfandel.

There is a wide range of lesser-known groups that are used to feed the country's still robust distilled spirits and fortified wine industry. These grapes typically produce bland, neutral wine that lends itself well to blending and distillation, but are rarely seen in varietal bottlings. These include: Belies, False Pedro, Kanaän, Raisin blanc, Sultana and Servan.

=== Pinotage ===
Pinotage, a crossing of Pinot noir and Cinsaut, has seen its plantings rise and fall in response to prevailing trends in the South African wine industry. Today, it is the second most widely planted red grape variety in South Africa. While there are supporters who want to make the grape South Africa's signature variety, critics of the grape note that hardly any other wine region in the world has planted this variety due to its flaws. In the early 1990s, as Apartheid ended and the world's wine market was opening up, winemakers in South Africa ignored Pinotage in favour of more internationally recognised varieties like Shiraz and Cabernet Sauvignon. Towards the end of the 20th century, the grape's fortunes began to turn, and by 1997 it commanded higher prices than any other South African grape. It is a required component (30–70%) in "Cape blends". Here, it is produced in a full range of styles, from easy-drinking quaffing wine and rosé to barrel-aged wine intended for cellaring. It is also made into a fortified "port-style", and even a red sparkling wine. The grape can be very dependent on the style of winemaking, with well-made examples having the potential to produce deep coloured, fruity wines that can be accessible early as well as age. However, critics of the variety believe that the variety's flaws – green vegetal flavours and tannins, and susceptibility to developing banana and nail polish acetate aromas – are present in far more examples of Pinotage that reach the consumer market. Pinotage reached its zenith in 2001, covering 7.3% of the total vineyard area, but this has since decreased to 6%.

== Important organisations ==
Many powerful organisations have led the South African wine industry, both in the private sector and through governmental agencies. Unlike other New World wine regions, the South African wine industry is largely influenced by several large co-operatives. The Koöperatieve Wijnbouwers Vereniging van Zuid-Afrika Bpkt (KWV) was a co-operative first created through the funding and encouragement of the South African government as a force to stabilise and grow the South African wine industry. As the KWV is now a privately owned winemaking co-operative, some of its regulatory responsibilities have been delegated to other organisations, such as the South African Wine & Spirit Board. The Wine & Spirit Board runs the voluntary certification programme that allows South African wines to be "certified" for quality and accuracy in labelling. In addition to being subject to various labelling guidelines, wines are blind tasted by a panel of experts for quality, and are put through an analytic test for faults. As with the vintage and varietal labelling guidelines, these tests are voluntary; however, wines not submitted for testing are subject to random testing to meet health requirements.

The Wine & Spirits board also operates the South African Wine Industry Trust (SAWIT) and provides funding for SAWIT's marketing and development. Established in 1999 by a joint agreement between the South African government and the KWV, which allocated 369 million rand ($46 million US$), SAWIS works to promote the export market for South African wines abroad and to develop new technologies and education. Additionally, SAWIS collaborates with the Black Economic Empowerment (BEE) programme to promote the black community's participation in the South African wine industry, including opportunities for vineyard and winery ownership.

== South African wine competitions ==
Wine competitions are held to assess whether a wine is of good quality and whether it is true to its character. The most prominent South African wine competitions include:

- ABSA Top 10 Pinotage
- Amorim Cap Classique Challenge
- Diners Club Winemaker of the Year
- FNB Sauvignon Blanc Top 10
- Michelangelo International Wine & Spirits Awards
- Old Mutual Trophy Wine Show
- Shiraz SA Challenge
- Standard Bank Chenin Blanc Top 10 Challenge
- Veritas Awards
- SA Terroir Wine Awards
- South African Wine Tasting Championship
- Vogue Wine & Spirits Awards

== See also ==
- Winemaking
- Agriculture in South Africa
- Boschendal
- Cape Classics
- Economy of the Western Cape
- KwaZulu-Natal wine
- List of wineries in South Africa
- South African cuisine
- The South African Wine Initiative
- Tot System
