= The Sadie Family =

South African wine producer

The Sadie Family is a South African producer of wine located in the Swartland region. Following the emergence of flagship wines Columella and Palladius, winemaker Eben Sadie has been described as an enfant terrible, South Africa's first certified celebrity winemaker, and by supporters as "one of the greatest and most original winemakers in the southern hemisphere". He has also branched out to other wine regions, such as in Spain.

== History ==
Prior to his career as a winemaker, following a period as a surfer, Eben Sadie traveled and worked in several of the world's wine regions, including Germany, Austria, Italy, Oregon and Burgundy. Having returned to South Africa, Sadie found work under Charles Back at The Spice Route in 1998, eventually becoming the chief winemaker and a resource Back described as "national asset for the South African wine industry".

The solo venture The Sadie Family was founded in 1999. The initial vintage of Columella in 2000 began on an exceptionally small scale, with a production of 17 barrels, approximately 5000 bottles. The first two vintages were produced at Back's Spice Route facilities until Sadie established Sadie Family Wines with R9000 (US$1297), and 14 barrels. The company consists of three employees, in addition to Eben Sadie, his brother and sister. The initial vintage of the Palladius was in 2002 with a production of seven barrels, just under 2000 bottles.

The Sadie Family has enjoyed success beyond any other modern South African wine producer as Columella is the most highly rated South African wine, and the only to achieve a 95-point rating by US wine magazine Wine Spectator. In defense of Columella's high retail price per bottle, Sadie states the wine is unusually costly to make.

=== Sequillo Cellars ===
Since 2003, the label Sequillo Cellars was started by Eben Sadie in partnership with Cornel Spies, to some degree considered The Sadie Family's more affordable second wines.

Eben Sadie stopped producing this wine in 2014. He is now focusing on The Sadie Family Wines exclusively.

=== Terroir al Límit ===
Eben Sadie was also involved with Spanish wine producer Terroir Al Límit in the village of Torroja in Priorat, Catalonia. This was a joint collaboration with Dominik A. Huber and viticulturist Jaume Sabaté. The project was founded in 2004 and initially drew upon fruit from the vineyards of Dits del Terra owned by Sadie, Arbossar owned by Huber. Despite the Northern Hemisphere agricultural cycle allowing Sadie to work both vintages, he started taking a less prominent role starting in 2010.

Sadie ceased all involvement in the project by 2010 and now focuses solely on his wines in South Africa.

== Production ==
Sadie sources Syrah and Mourvèdre from various terroirs located in the Voor-Paardeberg ward of the inland Paarl district, in total 43 hectares (110 acres) covering 48 separate parcels. Biodynamically produced, the grape yield average is extremely low, 1.2 pounds per vine. Vineyard pests are controlled using a seaweed spray. After, grapes are hand-sorted, stored in open wooden vats, twice daily trampled for a month, and then moved by buckets to a traditional basket press. Instead of using pumps to move the wine into barrels, gravity is applied.

For the flagship wine Columella, there is a blend of Syrah and Mourvèdre from eight different vineyard sites, and for Palladius there is blended Chenin blanc, Grenache blanc, Roussanne, Marsanne, Viognier, Clairette and Chardonnay. There is also produced a bush-vine white varietal wine from Chenin blanc named Mrs Kirsten's Old Vines.

From Sequillo Cellars, there are produced the Sequillo Red and Sequillo White. The red consists of Syrah, Mourvedre and Grenache, and the white is composed from Chenin blanc, Grenache blanc, Viognier, and Roussanne.
