= Weldra =

Variety of grape

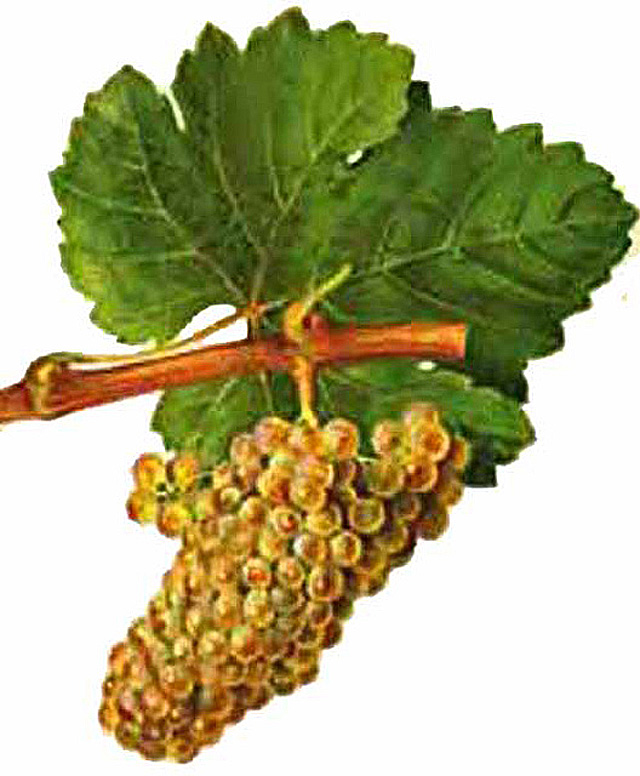
Chenin blanc, one of the parent varieties of Weldra

Weldra is a white South African wine grape variety that is a crossing of Chenin blanc and Trebbiano. According to wine expert Jancis Robinson, Weldra can maintain good acidity levels through ripening but tends to produce rather neutral tasting wines.

== See also ==
- Chenel, another white South African grape variety that is a crossing of Chenin blanc and Trebbiano
