= Chenel =

Variety of grape

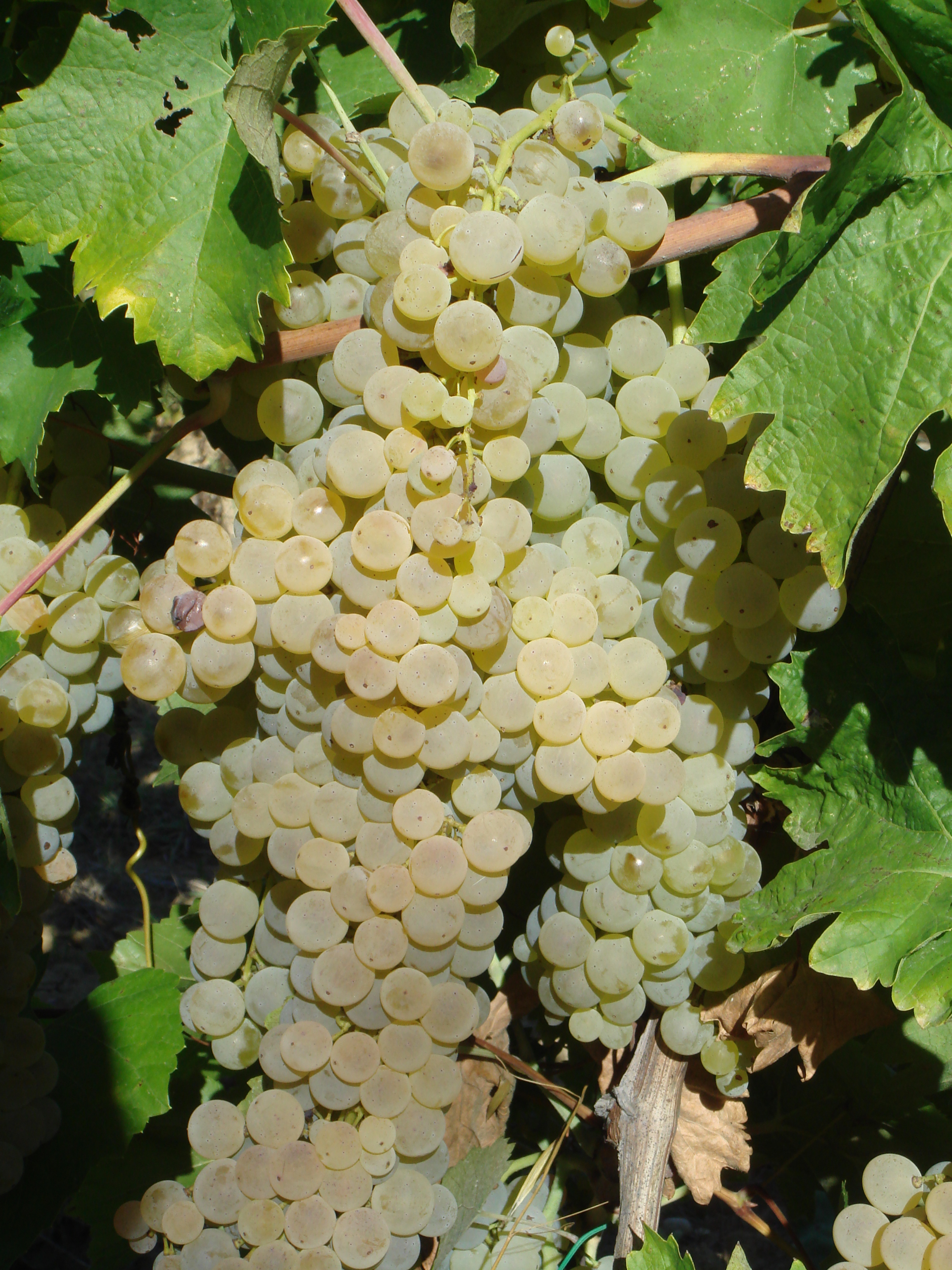
Trebbiano, one of the parent varieties of Chenel

Chenel is a white South African wine grape variety that was produced by a crossing of Chenin blanc and Trebbiano. The variety was produced in 1973 by Christiaan Johannes Orffer (1926–2008) at the Elsenburg Agricultural Training Institute.

It was the first domestic South African grape varietal to be introduced after Pinotage.

== See also ==
- Weldra, another white South African grape variety with the same parentage as Chenel
