= Chenin blanc =

Variety of grape

- Grape (Vitis)
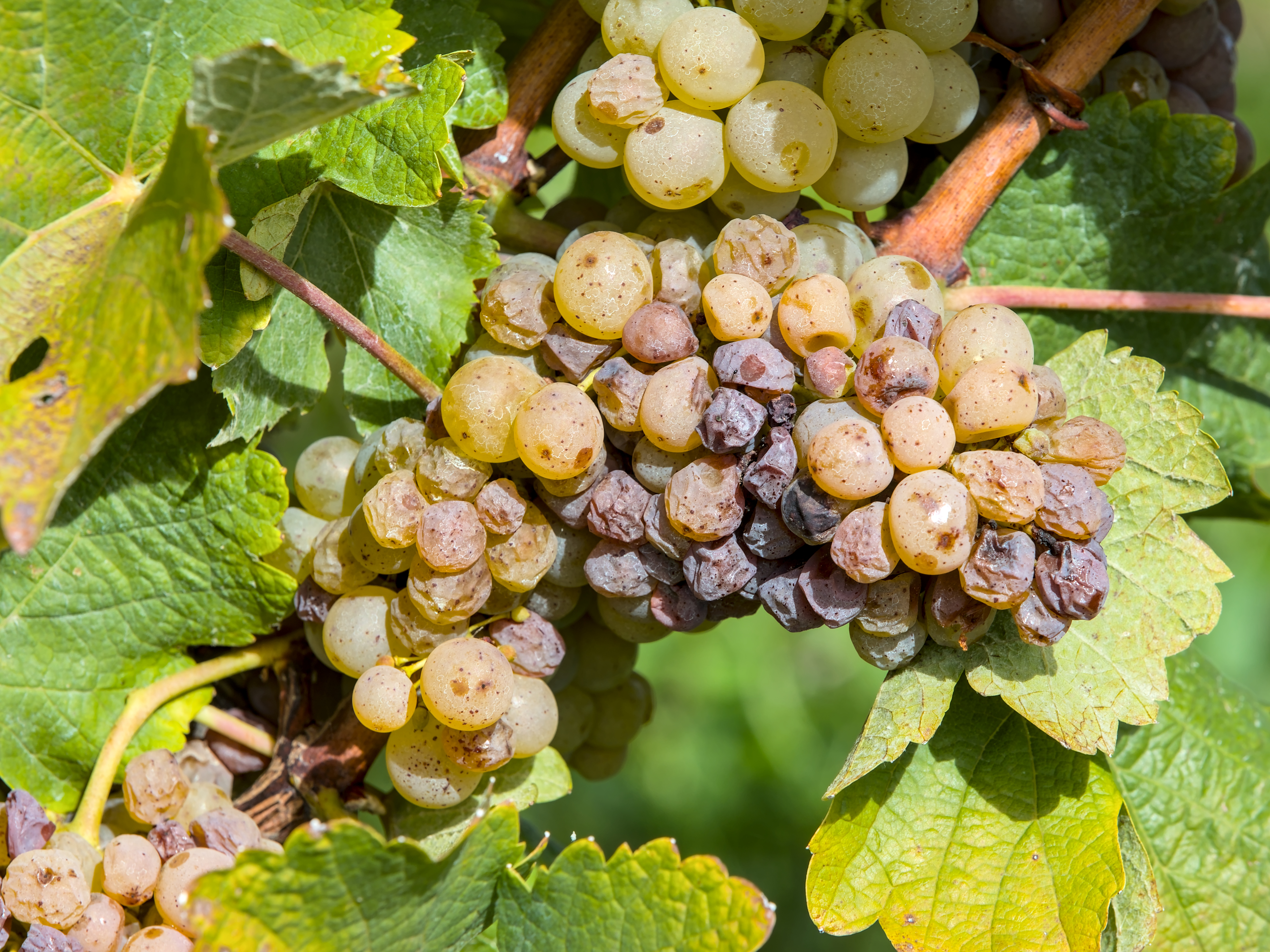
- A cluster of Chenin blanc grapes in Rochecorbon, France
- Color of berry skin: White
- Species: Vitis vinifera
- Also called: Steen, Pineau de la Loire, Pinot blanco (more)
- Origin: Loire, France
- Original pedigree: Sauvignon blanc × Trousseau
- Pedigree parent 1: Sauvignon blanc
- Pedigree parent 2: Trousseau
- Notable regions: Loire, South Africa
- Notable wines: Vouvray, Coteaux du Layon, sparkling Saumur
- Hazards: Bunch rot, sunburn, overproduction
- VIVC number: 2527

Chenin blanc (French pronunciation: [ʃənɛ̃ blɑ̃], lit. 'White Chenin'; known also as Pineau de la Loire among other names) is a white wine grape variety from the Loire Valley of France. Its high acidity means it can be used to make varieties from sparkling wines to well-balanced dessert wines, although it can produce very bland, neutral wines if the vine's natural vigor is not controlled. Outside the Loire, it is found in most of the New World wine regions; it is the most widely planted variety in South Africa, where it was historically also known as Steen (locally /stɪərn/ STEERN). The grape may have been one of the first to be grown in South Africa by Jan van Riebeeck in 1655, or it may have come to that country with Huguenots fleeing France after the revocation of the Edict of Nantes in 1685. Chenin blanc was often misidentified in Australia, as well, so tracing its early history in the country is not easy. It may have been introduced in James Busby's collection of 1832, but C. Waterhouse was growing Steen at Highercombe in Houghton, South Australia, by 1862.

It provides a fairly neutral palate for the expression of terroir, vintage variation, and the winemaker's treatment. In cool areas, the juice is sweet but high in acid with a full-bodied, fruity palate. In the unreliable summers of northern France, the acidity of under-ripened grapes was often masked with chaptalization with unsatisfactory results, whereas now, the less-ripened grapes are made into popular sparkling wines such as Crémant de Loire. The white wines of the Anjou AOC are a popular expression of Chenin as a dry wine, with flavors of quince and apples. In nearby Vouvray AOC, vintners aim for an off-dry style, developing honey and floral characteristics with age. In the best vintages, the grapes can be left on the vines to develop noble rot, producing an intense, viscous dessert wine, which may improve considerably with age.

== History ==
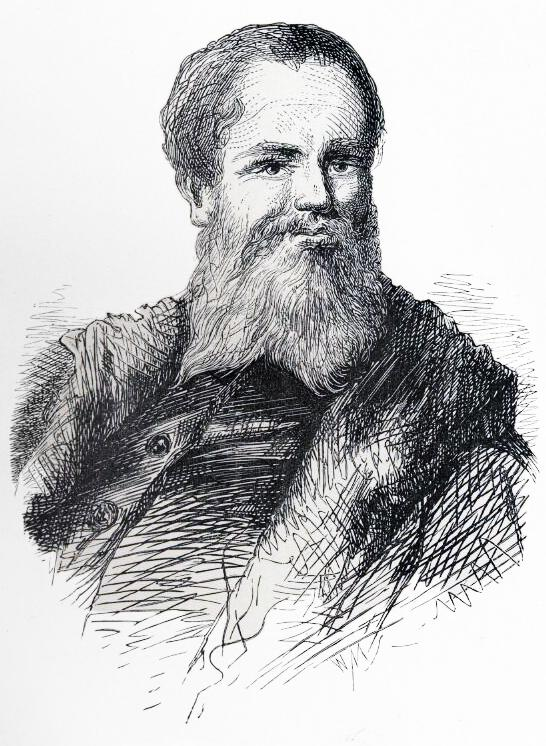
The works of French writer François Rabelais indicate that Chenin blanc was a major grape in the Loire Valley by the 16th century.

French ampelographer Pierre Galet has theorized that Chenin blanc originated in the Anjou wine region sometime in the 9th century, and from there traveled to Touraine by at least the 15th century. The grape may have been the variety described in two royal land grants of Charles the Bald in 845 detailed in the records of the abbey of Glanfeuil as growing on the left bank of the Loire River in vineyards belonging to individuals with the name of Soulangé and Bessé.

When Thomas Bohier purchased vineyard land around Chenonceaux on January 3, 1496, several grape varieties were brought in from the Burgundy wine region of Beaune, the Jura wine region of Arbois and nearby Orléans and Anjou. One of these varieties, a white grape known as Plant d'Anjou, was later planted between 1520 and 1535 at a nearby site known as Mont Chenin in Touraine by the Lord of Château de Chenonceau and his brother-in-law, Denis Briçonnet, the abbot of Cormery. Ampelographers believe that Plant d'Anjou was like Chenin blanc, with the grape eventually taking on the name from Mont Chenin.

French writer François Rabelais (1494–1553) wrote glowingly about the white wines of Anjou, and mentions the medicinal qualities of the grapes at the end of chapter XXV of Gargantua:

This done, the shepherds and shepherdesses made merry with these cakes and fine grapes, and sported themselves together at the sound of the pretty small pipe, scoffing and laughing at those vainglorious cake-bakers, who had that day met with a mischief for want of crossing themselves with a good hand in the morning. Nor did they forget to apply to Forgier's leg some fat chenin grapes, and so handsomely dressed it and bound it up that he was quickly cured.

From France, the grape spread to South Africa, where it was most likely included among the vine cuttings sent to Jan van Riebeeck in the Cape Colony by the Dutch East India Company. In the 20th century, a subvariety of Chenin planted in the Loire was found to be not actually Chenin blanc at all, but rather the Portuguese grape Verdelho, which is banned from French AOC regulations in the Loire.

=== Relationship to other grapes ===
In 1999, DNA analysis showed that Chenin blanc has a parent-offspring relationship with the Jura wine grape Savagnin. Additional DNA evidence shows that Chenin blanc shares a sibling relationship with Trousseau and Sauvignon blanc (both grapes the likely offspring of Savagnin), which strongly suggests that Chenin blanc is the offspring and Savagnin is the parent variety. Through Chenin's half-sibling relationship with Sauvignon blanc, the grape is related as an aunt/uncle variety to the Bordeaux wine grape Cabernet Sauvignon which is the offspring of Sauvignon blanc and Cabernet Franc.

Other DNA research has shown that a crossing of Chenin and the Hunnic grape Gouais blanc produced several varieties including Balzac blanc, Colombard and Meslier-Saint-François. In South Africa, the grape was crossed with the Italian wine grape Trebbiano to produce Weldra and Chenel.

Over the years, Chenin blanc has also been frequently confused with other grape varieties with which it does not seem to have a close genetic relationship. This includes the Portuguese wine grape Verdelho grown on the island of Madeira Machupiclait and in the Azores, as well as the Spanish wine grape Albillo, which was confused for Chenin blanc in Australia.

== Viticulture ==
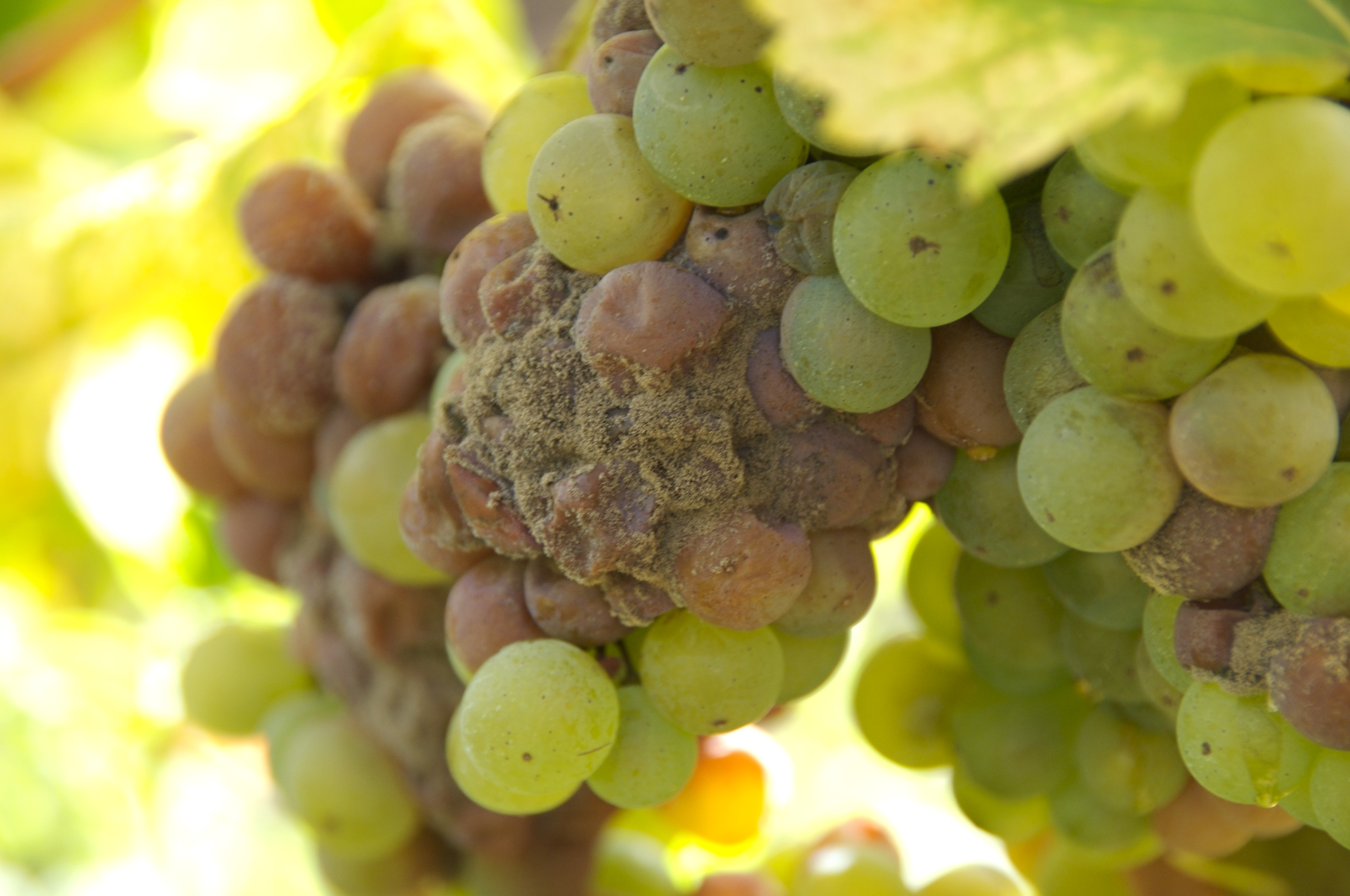
Chenin blanc grapes, like these Sauvignon blanc grapes pictured, are highly sensitive to developing noble rot, which produces a unique style of wine.

The Chenin blanc grapevine buds early in the growing season and ripens midway to late in the harvest year. However, in warm years, the balance between the Loire's marginal climate and the warmth needed to attain full ripeness has the potential of producing wines with some depth of complexity and finesse. The age of the vine can have an influence on wine quality, with older vines producing naturally lower yields. When infected by noble rot, which also lowers yields and adds and intensifies certain flavors, the wines develop less overtly floral aroma notes, but more depth and layers.

New clonal varieties have been developed that delay budding and increase sugar development during the ripening phase. Six of these new clones have been officially sanctioned by the French government. The vine is semi-upright in habit with three- to five-lobed leaves. It tends to break bud early, with conical, winged bunches containing yellow-green grapes that ripen late. The berries are typically 16.0 mm long x 14.2 mm wide, with an average weight of 1.79 g.

The climate of a wine region largely dictates whether Chenin blanc is produced in a predominantly sweet or dry manner, while the vineyard soil type generally influences the overall style of the wine. Heavy clay-based soils, paired with the right climate, are favorable to the development of weighty, botrytized dessert wines that need time to age and mature. Well-drained and less organic, predominantly sandy soils tend to produce lighter styles of wine that mature more quickly. Chenin blanc planted in soils with a high silex content produce wines with distinctive minerally notes, while limestone-based soils encourage wines with sharp acidity. In Vouvray, the soil is predominantly argilo-calcaire or calcareous clay, which produces rounded wines with both acidity and weight. In areas where schist is plentiful in the soil, Chenin blanc grapes generally ripen earlier than in vineyards with predominantly clay-based soils.

Among the viticultural hazards to which Chenin is susceptible (apart from botrytis in less than ideal conditions) are damage from spring frost, powdery mildew, and fungal disease (such as dead arm of grapevine) that affect the wood structures of the grape vine. Some of these hazards can be managed with integrated pest management and rootstock selection.

=== Yields and harvest times ===
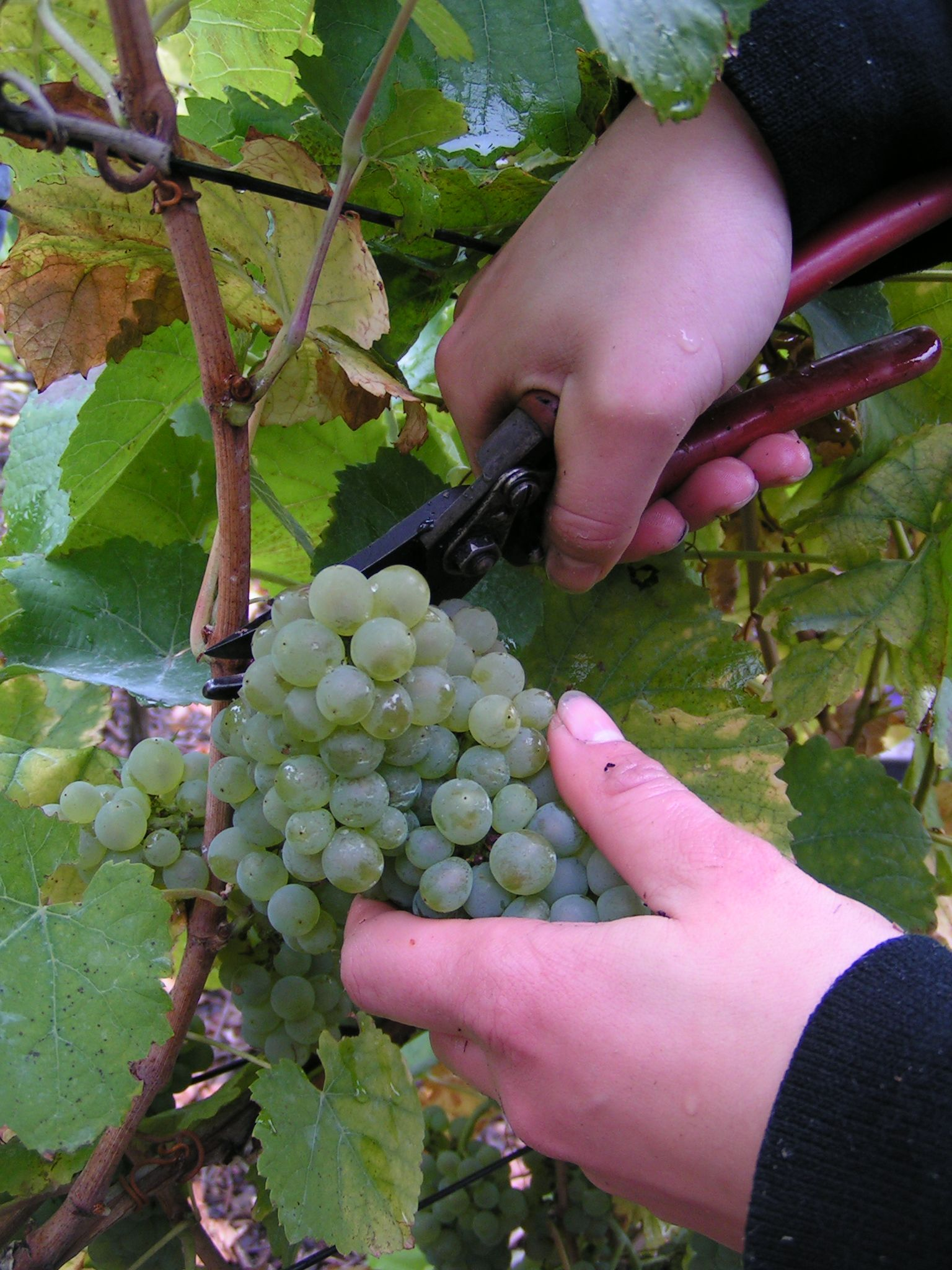
Producers often harvest Chenin blanc by hand in a succession of pickings known as "tries". The grapes may be harvested as whole clusters or individual berries.

While true for most wine grape varieties, the quality of Chenin blanc wine is intimately connected to the care taken in the vineyard. If the grapes are harvested too soon, before they ripen, the high acidity results in wine being (according to wine expert Oz Clarke) "one of the nastiest wines possible". If the grapes are harvested at too high of a yield, the grapes do not retain any of Chenin blanc's distinctive character notes. In the Loire, French regulations mandate that yields be kept low (40-50 hl/ha). At these levels, more of Chenin blanc's varietal characteristics of floral, honeyed aromas are exhibited. When the grape is harvested at high yields, such as the California Central Valley average of 10 tons per acre (175 hl/ha), Chenin's flavors become more bland and neutral. The vine is naturally vigorous and prone to overcropping if not kept in check. In fertile soils, as in parts of South Africa, Chenin blanc can easily produce yields of 240 hl/ha. To keep yields in check, vineyard managers may choose to graft Chenin vines with less vigorous rootstock from Vitis riparia or Vitis rupestris vines. During the growing season, they may also elect to do a green harvest where excess grape clusters are removed.

With optimal ripeness and balance between acidity and sugars being such a viticultural priority for Chenin blanc, many growers (such as those in the Loire Valley) harvest the grapes in "tries" or successive pickings through the vineyards. During each series of picking, only the ripest clusters or individual grapes are harvested by hand during a period that could last four to six weeks and include three to six passes through the vineyard. For the production of sweet botrytized wines, pickers look for the grapes that have achieved the necessary amount of the noble rot. In hot and dry years where no noble rot occurs, pickers may leave ripened grapes on the vine long enough to shrivel, or passerillé, where they could later be affected by noble rot. In areas that experience considerable vintage variation, winemakers may decide on a day-by-day basis what style and dryness of Chenin blanc they could make, with the grapes harvested during each try going to different styles of wine. For some producers in Vouvray, which may have up to six tries during harvest, the first few could go to sparkling and dry wine production, while the later trie could go towards sweet wine production.

== Wine regions ==
While Chenin blanc is planted across the globe from China to New Zealand, Canada, and Argentina, it is considered a "major" planting in only a few locations. Though France is the viticultural home of Chenin blanc, by the turn of the 21st century, twice as much Chenin blanc was planted in South Africa as in France. The grape's versatility and ability to reflect terroir causes it to lead, as what Jancis Robinson describes, a "double life". In the Loire Valley of France, it is prized as a premium quality wine grape able to produce world-class wines, while in many New World wine regions, it used as a "workhorse variety", contributing acidity to bulk white blends and showing more neutral flavors rather than terroir. Throughout all its manifestations, Chenin blanc's characteristic acidity is found almost universally in all wine regions.

=== France ===
Chenin blanc can be made in a variety of styles, such as this sparkling wine from Vouvray.

Ampelographers theorize that Chenin blanc originated in the Loire Valley of France sometime in the 9th century. Today, the Loire is the French wine region most closely associated with the variety. In 2008, 9,828 hectares (24,290 acres) of Chenin were planted in France, mostly in the Indre-et-Loire, Loir-et-Cher, and Maine-et-Loire departments with the Anjou region around the city of Angers in the Maine-et-Loire having the most significant plantings with 5,044 hectares (12,460 acres) in 2008. While Chenin blanc still accounts for around 1.2% of all French plantings, these numbers are a significant drop from the 16,594 hectares (41,000 acres) of grapevines that were in cultivation in 1958.

Chenin blanc is an authorized planting in many Appellation d'origine contrôlée (AOC) regions, but is mostly planted in the Middle Loire AOCs of Anjou, Bonnezeaux, Crémant de Loire, Coteaux de l'Aubance, Coteaux du Layon, Jasnières, Montlouis, Quarts de Chaume, Saumur, Savennières, and Vouvray. The wines of the Coteaux du Layon, Bonnezeaux, and Quarts de Chaume are produced as sweet dessert wines, while Savennières produce predominantly dry wines. The wines of Anjou, Crémant de Loire, Coteaux de l'Aubance, Jasnières, Montlouis, Saumur, and Vouvray have a wide range of sweetness levels, from dry to semi-sweet to sweet.

In the 1970s, plantings of Chenin blanc in the Loire were uprooted in favor of the more fashionable red Cabernet Franc and white Sauvignon blanc, as well as the easier-to-grow Gamay. This consolidated Chenin's presence to the Middle Loire region around Anjou-Saumur and Touraine. In the 1980s, interest in the sweet dessert wines of the Loire renewed enthusiasm for Chenin blanc in the region. During this time, the Bordeaux wine region of Sauternes had experienced a series of favorable vintages that gave a dramatic increase in prices as supply began to dwindle in face of high demand. Wine consumers who had developed an appreciation for these sweet wines began to look to the Loire as another source. The 1990s brought a string of successful vintages to the Middle Loire that produced many highly rated Chenin wines affected by noble rot. As wine expert Oz Clarke noted, these wines became the "standard-bearer" for Chenin blanc.

The climate of the wine region tends to dictate what style of Chenin blanc is most prevalent in the area. In the northernmost reaches of Jasnières, Chenin blanc is at its limits for cultivation, with the wines being mostly dry and thin. While most of the Middle Loire experiences a continental climate, the Coteaux du Layon receives more climatic influence from the Atlantic Ocean, which promotes the development of Botrytis cinerea, than in nearby Vouvray or Montlouis. While all three AOCs produce sweet, botrytized wine, less vintage variation is found in the Coteaux du Layon. The cool continental influence in Montlouis and Vouvray lends itself to producing a wide range of Chenin blanc, including grapes with the necessary balance of acidity to sugar needed to produce sparkling wine. In the AOC of Savennières, less fog and mist from the nearby rivers occur and more wind that makes botrytis taking root more difficult. This is part of the reason why Savennières is the one Loire AOC that produces predominantly dry Chenin blanc. In the south of France, the warm Mediterranean climate of the Languedoc region encourages the production of many more dry styles of Chenin blanc rather than sweet.

==== Other wine styles and French Chenins ====
While most Chenin blanc is produced as a varietal wine, up to 20% of Chardonnay and Sauvignon blanc are permitted in wines with the basic Anjou, Saumur, and Touraine designations. The high acidity of Chenin blanc lends itself well to sparkling-wine production, where it is an important component of Crémant de Loire, sparkling Vouvray, and in the Languedoc wine region of Limoux. In Crémant de Limoux, Chenin must account for at least 20% and up to 40% of the blend with Mauzac, Pinot noir and Chardonnay. The grape is also permitted in the still wines of Limoux, but is only blended with Mauzac and Chardonnay.

Outside the Loire, in addition to the Languedoc plantings in Limoux, other French plantings of Chenin blanc can be found in Corsica (with 60 hectares (150 acres) planted on the island in 2008), Charentes, and the Aveyron department. In South West France, it is permitted to be used in the white wines of the Côtes de Duras and the Garonne wines of Vins d'Estaing and Vins d'Entraygues et du Fel.

=== South Africa ===
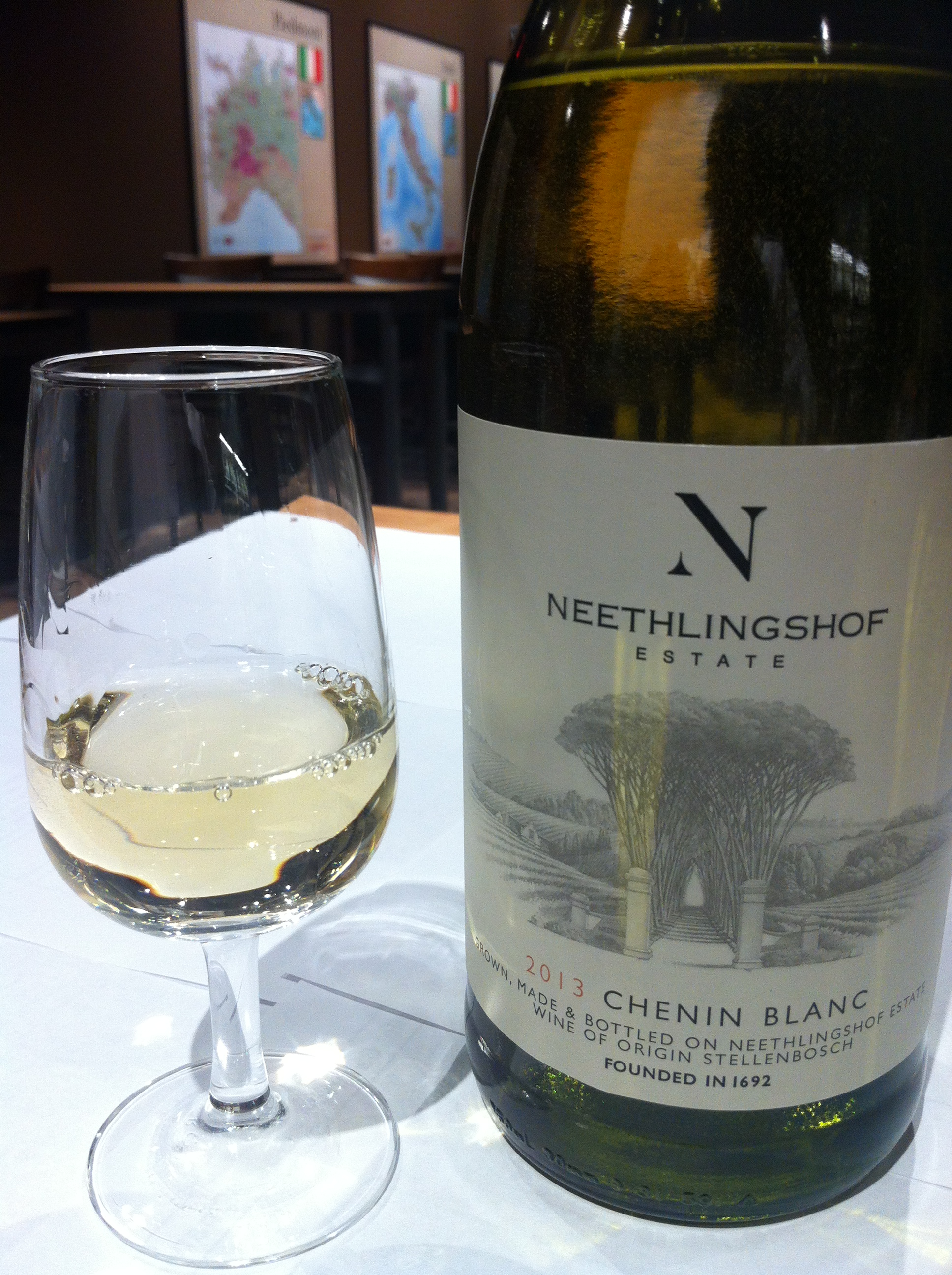
South African Chenin blancs tend to emphasize more tropical fruit flavors than their Loire counterparts.

In South Africa, Chenin blanc is the most widely planted variety, accounting for nearly one-fifth (18.6%) of all vineyard plantings in the early 21st century. In 2008, 18,852 hectares (46,580 acres) of the grape were planted, nearly twice the amount of Chenin blanc planted in France. Most of the plantings are found in the Western Cape wine region of Paarl in the Cape Winelands District Municipality, with 3,326 hectares (8,220 acres) with the Swartland region of Malmesbury and Olifants River not far behind with 3,317 and 2,521 hectares (8,200 and 6,230 acres), respectively, in cultivation in 2008.

The variety was most likely introduced to the country in the collection of cuttings sent to Jan van Riebeeck by the Dutch East India Company. For the next two hundred years of South African wine history, the variety was known as Steen. Ampelographers were not able to concretely identify the numerous plantings of Steen around the country as being Chenin blanc until 1965. In the late 1960s and early 1970s, Chenin blanc was the principal grape in the South African wine industry's "white wine renaissance" that was ushered in by the introduction of new technologies such as temperature-controlled fermentation vessels. During this time, the focus was on producing off-dry, clean, and crisp wine that was mostly neutral in flavor and could capitalize on the wine market's demand for white wine. Near the end of the 20th century, several Chenin blanc specialist producers emerged and worked with vineyard managers to isolate older Chenin vines on suitable terroir. Their goal was to produce wines that exhibited Chenin's unique aromas and traits. While plantings of Chenin blanc have decreased, the work of these producers resulted in improved quality profiles of South African Chenin blanc.

=== United States ===
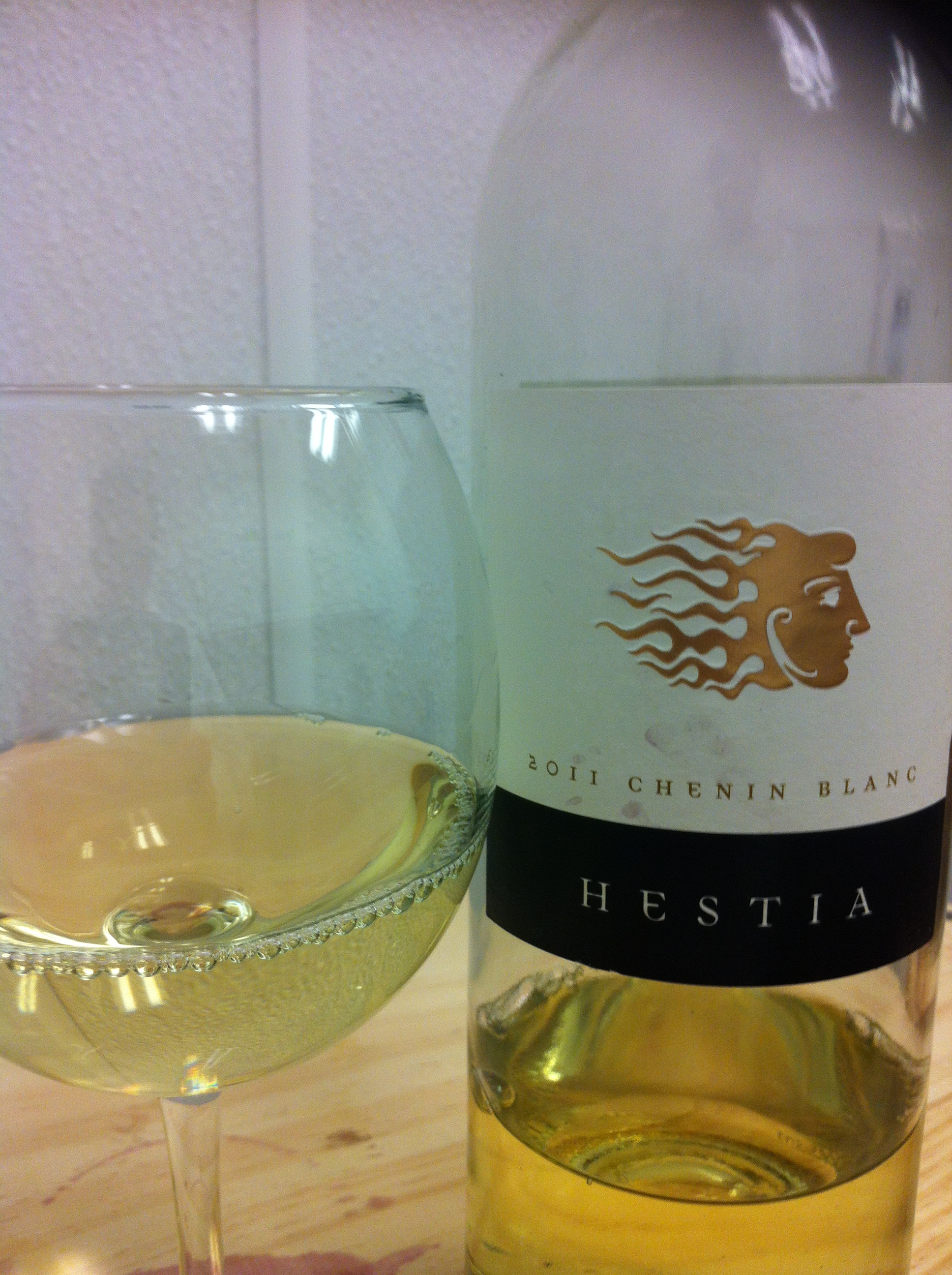
A Chenin blanc from Washington

During the 1980s, the California wine industry had more acreage of Chenin blanc planted than France, though the plantings later steadily declined. By 2006, 13,000 acres (5,300 ha) were planted there, mostly in the hot Central Valley. In 2010, this level was down to 7,223 acres (2,923 ha).

For most of its history in the California wine industry, the grape was considered a "workhorse variety" that could be used anonymously in bulk and jug wine blends. Chenin's natural acidity and ability to adapt to wines of varying degrees of sweetness made it an ideal blending partner with Colombard and Chardonnay in mass-produced blends. Until close to the turn 21st century, producers in Sacramento Valley's Clarksburg AVA had not started to make quality varietal Chenin blancs a specialty; Chenin blancs from these producers tend to show a characteristic musky melon aroma and have the potential to age well.

While Chenin blanc is grown throughout the United States, the American Viticultural Areas with the most significant amount of plantings include the California AVAs of Clarksburg, Napa Valley, and Mendocino, the Washington wine regions of the Yakima and Columbia Valley, and the Texas High Plains AVA. In 2012, Washington had 200 acres (81 ha) of Chenin while Texas was growing 300 acres (120 ha).

Other states in the United States with plantings of Chenin blanc include New York, Missouri, Wisconsin, Minnesota, Arizona, New Mexico, Maryland, North Carolina, Virginia, Idaho, Colorado and Texas. In 1990, 44 acres (18 ha) of Chenin blanc were planted in Oregon, but by 2001, virtually all of it had been uprooted with only a few isolated plantings remaining.

=== Other wine regions ===
In Australia, the country's 1,500 acres (610 ha) of Chenin blanc are mostly grown as a blending variety often used with Chardonnay, Sauvignon blanc, and Semillon. Australian Chenin plantings can be found in Tasmania, New South Wales, Victoria, and South Australia, as well as the Swan Valley and Margaret River areas of Western Australia. Wine expert James Halliday describes the style of Australia Chenin blanc as "tutti-frutti" with pronounced fruit salad notes. However, the wines produced in Western Australia have garnered more critical attention. In 2008, there were 1,586 acres (642 ha) of Chenin blanc in cultivation in Australia.

In New Zealand, acreage of the variety fell to just under 250 acres (100 ha) by 2004. By 2008, that number had dropped to 124 acres (50 ha). Planted primarily on the North Island, some examples of New Zealand Chenin blanc have drawn favorable comparisons to the sweet dessert styles of Chenin from the Loire Valley. Historically, the grape has been used as a blending partner with Müller-Thurgau in mass-produced blends. The success of some critically acclaimed New Zealand Chenin blancs has sparked interest in planting the variety. As experts such as Oz Clarke have noted, though, as long as the value of New Zealand Chardonnay and Sauvignon blanc stays high, little economic reason exists to pursue premium Chenin blanc production.

Chenin blanc is found planted throughout South America, though for many years plantings Argentina, Brazil, and Uruguay were confused for Pinot blanc. The grape was used primarily in mass-produced white blends. In 2008, Argentina had 7,186 acres (2,908 ha) of Chenin blanc, most of it in the Mendoza wine region, while Brazil, Chile, and Uruguay had 74 acres (30 ha), 188 acres (76 ha), and 17 acres (6.9 ha) of grapevines planted, respectively.

The grape was exported to Israel in the 20th century, where it is still found in limited quantities. Canada has Chenin blanc planted in the Okanagan wine region of British Columbia and in Ontario. Some plantings of Chenin blanc can be found in the Spanish wine regions, mainly in Catalonia. In 2015, 112 hectares (280 acres) of the grape were planted, but this number may rise as DNA analysis in 2006 discovered the Agudelo grape variety growing in the Galicia, Alella, and Penedès wine region is actually Chenin blanc. The tropical wine regions of India and Thailand also has some limited plantings of the grape.

== Winemaking and wine styles ==
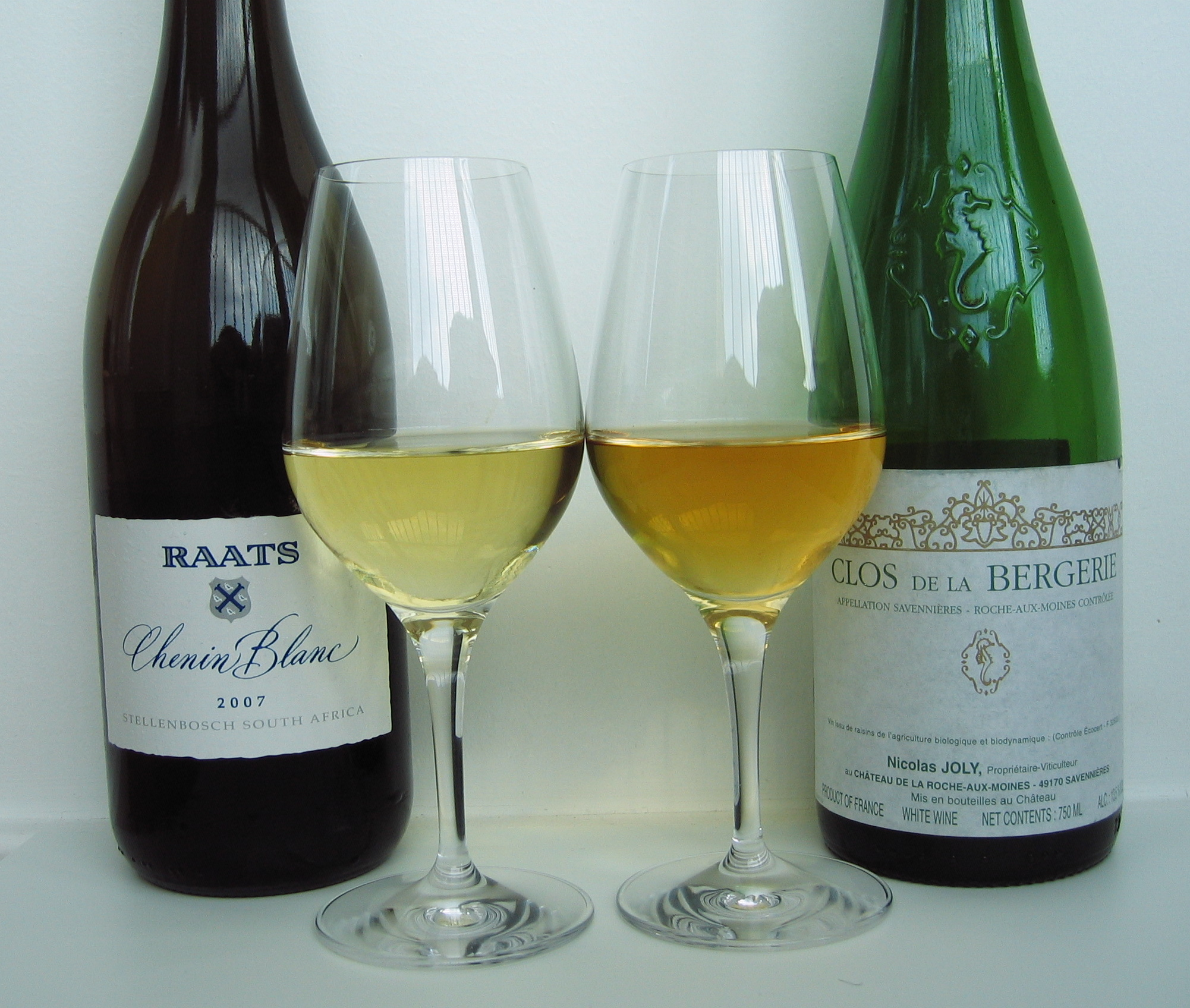
A South African (left) and Loire (right) Chenin blanc

Wine expert Jancis Robinson has noted that Chenin blanc is probably the world's most versatile grape, being able to produce quality wines of various sweetness, including dessert wines noted for their aging ability, as well as sparkling made according to the méthode champenoise and fortified wines. The grape can distinguish itself as a single varietal wine, or it can add acidity as a blending component. Its ability to be crafted into premium-quality wines across a wide spectrum of dry and sweetness levels invites the comparison to German Rieslings, with Robinson noting that in many ways, Chenin blanc is France's answer to the German Riesling.

One of the major differences between Old World- and New World-styles of Chenin blanc is the fermentation temperature. Old World-style producers in the Loire tend to ferment their Chenin blanc at higher temperatures, 60–68 °F (16–20 °C), than New World producers in South Africa and elsewhere, usually fermenting their whites at temperatures around 50–54 °F (10–12 °C). This is because Old World wine producers tend not to put a premium on the tropical fruit flavors and aromas that come out more vividly with cooler fermentation temperatures. Chenin blanc can accommodate some skin contact and maceration, which will allow extraction of phenolic compounds that could add to the complexity of the wine. Two of the aromas that skin contact can bring out is the characteristic greengage and angelica notes of Chenin. The grape's characteristic acidity can be softened by malolactic fermentation, which gives the wine a creamier or "fattier" texture, as would a period spent aging on the lees. The use of wood or oak aging is up to each individual producer. Old World producers tend to shy away from the use of new oak barrels, which can impart flavors of vanilla, spice, and toasted notes, though these notes may be desirable for a New World producer. In Savennières, a tradition remains of using acacia and chestnut barrels for aging, though acacia can impart a yellow tint to the wine, and chestnut barrels may add some buttery notes.

== Wines ==
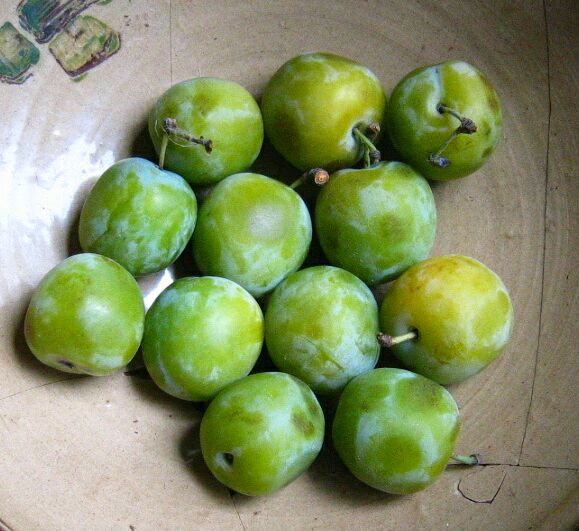
The aroma of greengage is a common descriptor for Chenin blanc wines.

The aromas and flavor notes of Chenin blanc often include the descriptors of minerally, greengage, angelica and honey. Chenin wines produced from noble rot will often have notes of peaches and honey that develop into barley sugar, marzipan, and quince as they age. Dry or semisweet Chenin blanc from the Loire will often have notes apple, greengage, and chalky minerals that develop into more honey, acacia, and quince aromas. New World styles of Chenin, such as those of South Africa, are more often made to be consume young and exhibit rich tropical fruit notes such as banana, guava, pear, and pineapple. The alcohol level for dessert styles Chenin rarely goes above 12%, which keeps the wines more in balance. Drier styles of Chenin are more likely to be around 13.5%.

The aging ability of sweet Loire Chenin blanc is among the longest-lived in the world of wine, with well-made examples from favorable vintages regularly having the potential to last for at least 100 years. This longevity is attributed to the grape's naturally high acidity, which acts as a preservative. As phenolic compounds in the wine break down, they add complexity and depth to the wine. Some off-dry or "demi-sec" examples may need at least 10 years before they start drinking at peak levels and could continue to develop for another 20 to 30 years. Sparkling and dry examples of Chenin blanc from premium production and favorable vintages have also shown longevity levels not commonly associated with white wine. However, as they age, Chenin blanc wines are prone to going through "dumb phases" where the wine closes up, revealing little aroma and varietal characteristics.

== Food pairings ==
Chenin blanc can be a very versatile player in food and wine pairings, but the wide range of wine styles needs to be taken into account. Lighter, dry styles can pair well with light dishes such as salads, fish, and chicken. The sweeter styles of Chenin blanc can balance the spicy heat of some Asian and Hispanic cuisines. The acidity and balance of medium-dry styles can pair well with cream sauces and rich dishes such as pâté.

== Synonyms ==
Over the years, Chenin blanc has been known under a variety of synonyms, including Agudelo (in Spain), Agudillo (Spain), Anjou, Blanc d'Aunis, Blanc d’Anjou, Capbreton blanc (Landes, France), Confort, Coue Fort, Cruchinet, Cugnette, Feher Chenin, Franc blanc (Aveyron, France), Franche, Gamet blanc (Aveyron, France), Gros Chenin (in Maine-et-Loire and Indre-et-Loire), Gros Pineau (in Touraine), Gros Pinot Blanc de la Loire, Gout Fort, Luarskoe, Pineau d'Anjou (in Mayenne), Pineau de Briollay, Pineau de la Loire (in Indre-et-Loire), Pineau de Savennières, Pineau Gros, Pineau Gros de Vouvray, Pineau Nantais, Plant d’Anjou (in Indre-et-Loire), Plant de Brézé, Plant de Salces, Plant de Salles, Plant du Clair de Lune, Quefort, Rajoulin, Ronchalin, Rouchelein, Rouchelin (in Gironde and Périgord), Rouchalin, Rougelin, Steen (South Africa), Stein, Tête de Crabe, Vaalblaar Stein and Verdurant.

== See also ==
- International variety
- The Sadie Family Wines - Sadie Family
- Clos de la Coulée de Serrant - Joly Family
