= Cape Classics =

Wine Importer

Cape Classics is the largest importer of South African wines to the United States. A privately held company founded by Andre and Gary Shearer in 1992, Cape Classics focuses on South African and French wine, today representing 30 estates and labels with distribution in 50 states.

== Brands ==
- B Vintners
- Bartinney
- Bayten
- Braai
- Château du Raux
- Clos du Gaimont
- De Toren
- DeMorgenzon
- Domaine de La Réserve d'O
- Domaine Paul Buisse
- Domaine Philippe Colin
- Domaine Vincent Carême
- Domaine Vrignaud
- Excelsior
- Glenelly
- Indaba
- Jam Jar
- Kanonkop
- Le Roi des Pierres
- Lourensford
- Maison Matisco
- Maison Philippe Pacalet
- Mas Janeil by François Lurton
- Mvemve Raats
- Pierre Dupond La Renjardière
- Raats Family Wines
- Rudi Schultz
- Terre Brûlée
- Topiary
- Vins Auvigue

== Key Partners ==
Cape Classics has partnership with Darden Restaurants (Seasons 52, The Capital Grille, Yard House), Walt Disney World, Trader Joe's, Costco and Whole Foods Market

== Awards ==
- "Best Wine Importer" - Food & Wine magazine
- "Name You Can Trust" - Food & Wine magazine's "Annual Wine Guide" for ten consecutive years

== See also ==
- South African wine
- French Wine
