= The South African Wine Initiative =

Organisation

The South African Wine Initiative is an organisation that seeks to create global awareness of the exploitation of workers and environmental abuses as they allegedly relate to the South African wine industry and its practices.

== Strike-breaking with mechanical harvesters ==
Until the late 1990s, all grapes in South African vineyards were harvested by workers by hand. Workers received low wages, as little as 95 Rands a week, and were housed in dangerous and unsanitary conditions. Workers organised strikes in order to negotiate better pay and housing conditions. Mechanical harvesters were originally brought in as a strike-breaking ploy, however vineyard owners quickly saw their economic benefits for the profitability of their businesses. Each machine replaced 200 workers and could be operated by only one driver. As a result of the introduction of these machine during the last year of Apartheid (1994) thousands of South African workers were left unemployed and homeless.

== Legacy of the dop system ==
The South African wine industry was also responsible for the "dop system", which involved replacing partial monetary wages for work with payments of wine. This practice has been illegal since 1961, but was practised until the end of Apartheid. According to an August 2011 Human Rights Watch Report, civil society actors assert that "dop" payments continue to a limited extent, but they are having difficulties to document it, as farmworkers are reluctant to discuss it, fearing to lose the "dop" payments. The report documents two farms in the Western Cape that provide farmworkers with wine as partial compensation, and farms giving their workers free wine. The existence of the "dop system" over a long period has caused the Western Cape's grape-pickers to suffer the highest rate of Fetal alcohol syndrome (FAS) in the world. According to research, some 25,000 FAS children are born in South Africa every year. The wine industry does not currently carry any responsibility in terms of addressing these issues.

== Animal parts in wine ==
Mechanical harvesters are machines that straddle grape vines and through a combination of vibration and suction harvest grapes off the vine. As a consequence of this action, an indeterminate number of insects, reptiles, small mammals and bird's eggs are processed with the grapes as they are turned into wine. Manual labourers claim that since there is no human perception and decision-making in the mechanical reaping process, these creatures end up in a "destalking screw" where their blood and debris contaminates the wine.

== Cape Dwarf Chameleon ==
Of particular concern is the decimation of the Cape Dwarf Chameleon population, a Convention on International Trade in Endangered Species (CITES)-protected species. South African law (ordinance 19 of 1974, 44.1C) states that it is illegal to produce a product with a part of a protected species without the necessary permit. To date the Department of Cape Nature Conservation has issued no such permit to the South African Wine Industry. Thus, advocates for environmental rights claim the use of mechanical harvesters is illegal if their use endangers the chameleon.

== See also ==
- Green movement in South Africa
- Mechanised agriculture
