= Paul Siguqa =

South African winemaker and businessman

- Born: c. 1981; Franschhoek, South Africa
- Occupation(s): Entrepreneur, Winery Owner
- Employer: Self-employed
- Known for: Owner of Klein Goederust winery

Paul Siguqa is a South African entrepreneur and the owner of the Klein Goederust winery.

== Biography ==
=== Early life and education ===
Siguqa grew up in a two-bedroom cottage near Franschhoek with his sister and mother, who was a vineyard labourer under the South African apartheid. To earn money for his university education, he bought fruit in bulk and reselling it. He told The New York Times he made 875 rand on the first weekend, more than his mother's monthly wage.

After university, he founded a communications and events company.

=== Wine career ===
Siquga came across a 24 acre property on sale for 12 million ZAR, which he bought in cash in 2019. After spending 23 million ZAR on renovations, he opened his winery on December 3, 2021.
