= Tot System =

Notorious truck system used at South African wine farms

The Tot System, also known as the Dop System (after the Afrikaans word 'dop' meaning an alcoholic drink), is a notorious truck system which was used in South African wine farms particularly in the Western Cape. Farm workers would receive payment in the form of money with a daily measure of cheap wine as a fringe benefit. This practice increased and exacerbated alcoholism among farm workers, which resulted in widespread social damage among communities, particularly the Cape Coloured community.

The practice goes back to the European settlers of the seventeenth century. It was outlawed in 1960, but the ban was not enforced until the 1990s when South Africa's new democratic government under Nelson Mandela saw the demise of the practice. In 2003 a new Liquor Act which outlaws the "dop" system was adopted by the South African Parliament. The bill states that "an employer must not supply liquor or methylated spirits to any person as an inducement to employment; supply liquor or methylated spirits to an employee as or in lieu of wages or remuneration; or deduct from an employees’ wages or remuneration any amount relating to the cost of liquor or methylated spirits.

Although there have been reports that some farm workers still do receive partial payment in wine, the "tot" system has been largely eradicated. However, the legacy continues as alcoholism is still rife. A 2000 study of Fetal Alcohol Syndrome (FAS) in a community in the Western Cape Province shows that the “historical presence of the wine industry in the Western Cape and the drinking patterns that have developed have produced a high FAS rate.” Today some areas of the Western Cape have the highest incidence of FAS in the world. Although now paid in cash, many workers spend their wages on alcohol, often sold to them by the farmers, or from illegal shebeens in the area. In 2007, the South African Wine Industry banned the 'papsak' (an Afrikaans word meaning 'soft sack' referring to cheap wine sold in a foil-lined plastic bag), and NGOs such as Dopstop are striving to address alcoholism and other substance abuse problems that plague the poor rural communities of South Africa.
