= Western Cape wine =

Geographical Unit within the Wine of Origin classification system of South African wine

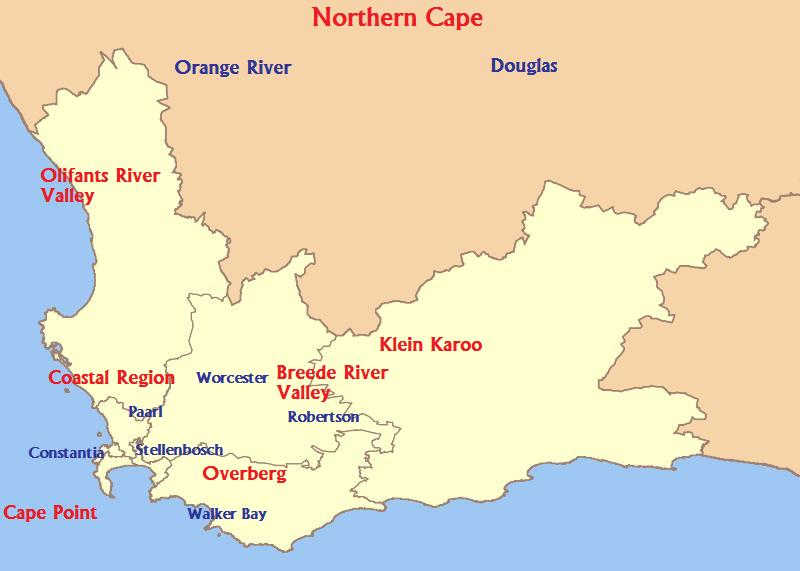
South African wine regions

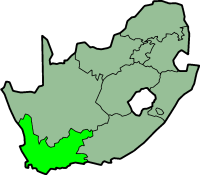
The majority of South Africa's wine regions are located in the Western Cape

Western Cape is a Geographical Unit within the Wine of Origin classification system of South African wine. Corresponding to the province of Western Cape it includes most of the vineyards in South Africa.

== Style ==
The wines of the Western Cape range from sturdy Rhone-style red wines to aromatic Sauvignon blancs in vineyards cooled by breezes off the Atlantic.

== History ==
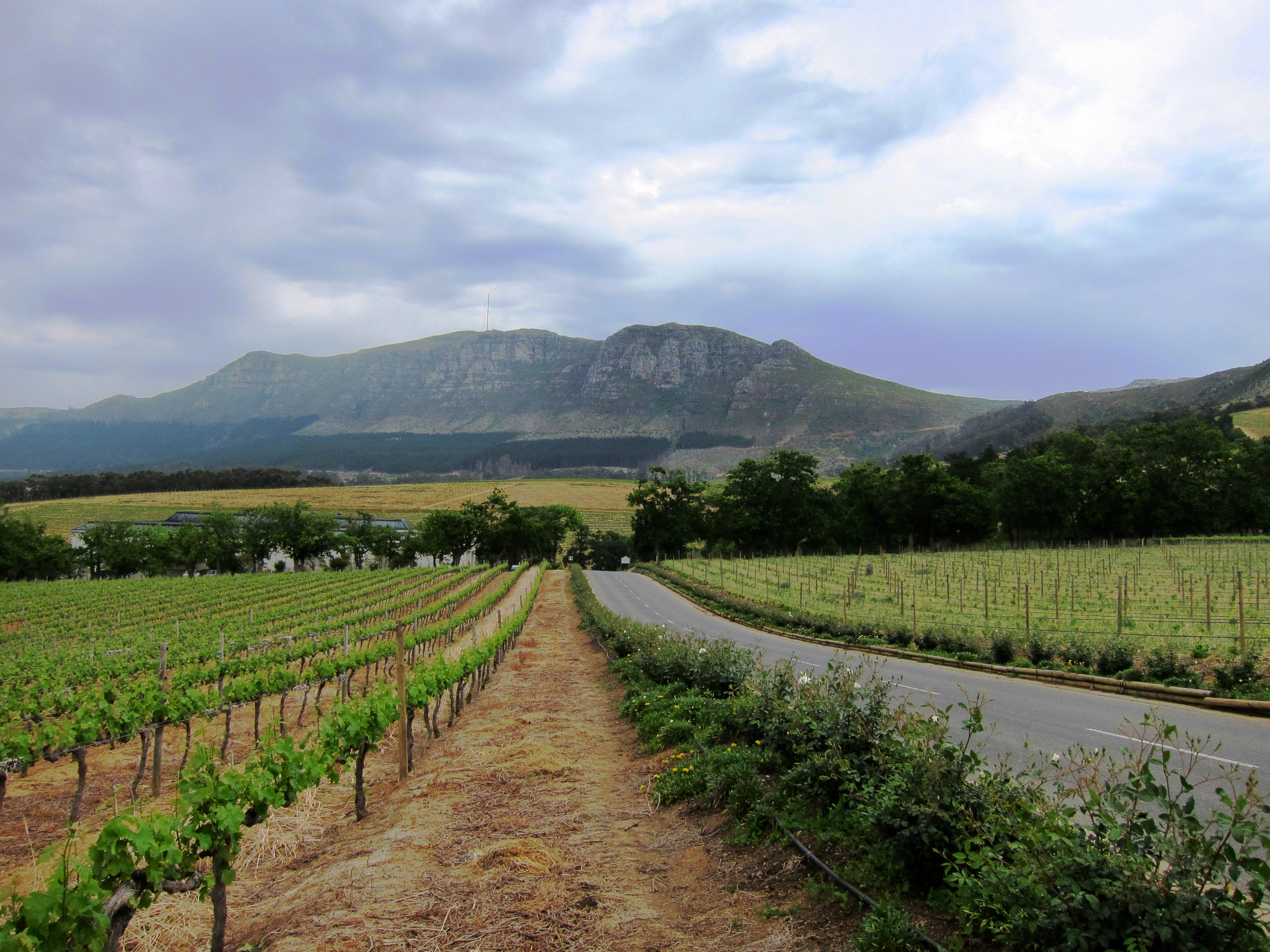
Groot Constantia, the oldest wine estate in South Africa

On 2 February 1659 the founder of Cape Town, Jan van Riebeeck, produced the first wine recorded in South Africa. In 1685, the Constantia estate was established in a valley facing False Bay by the Governor of the Cape, Simon van der Stel. His 'Vin de Constance' soon acquired a good reputation. But it was Hendrik Cloete, who bought the homestead in 1778, who really made the name of Constantia famous, with an unfortified wine made from a blend of mostly Muscat de Frontignan (Muscat Blanc à Petits Grains), Pontiac, red and white Muscadel (probably clones of Muscat Blanc à Petits Grains??) and a little Chenin blanc. It became a favorite tipple of European kings and emperors, from Frederick the Great to Napoleon. But the vineyards were decimated by phylloxera, the Cloete family were bankrupted, and Groot Constantia was sold to the government as an experimental station. In 1980 Duggie Jooste bought Klein Constantia, redeveloped it, and is now selling a new version of Vin de Constance made from Muscat Blanc à Petits Grains.

The Franschhoek Valley was settled over 300 years ago by the French Huguenots. The first official wine route was opened in Stellenbosch in 1971.

== Wine of Origin ==
In 1993, Western Cape was designated as a Geographical Unit under the Wine of Origin scheme.

== Geography ==
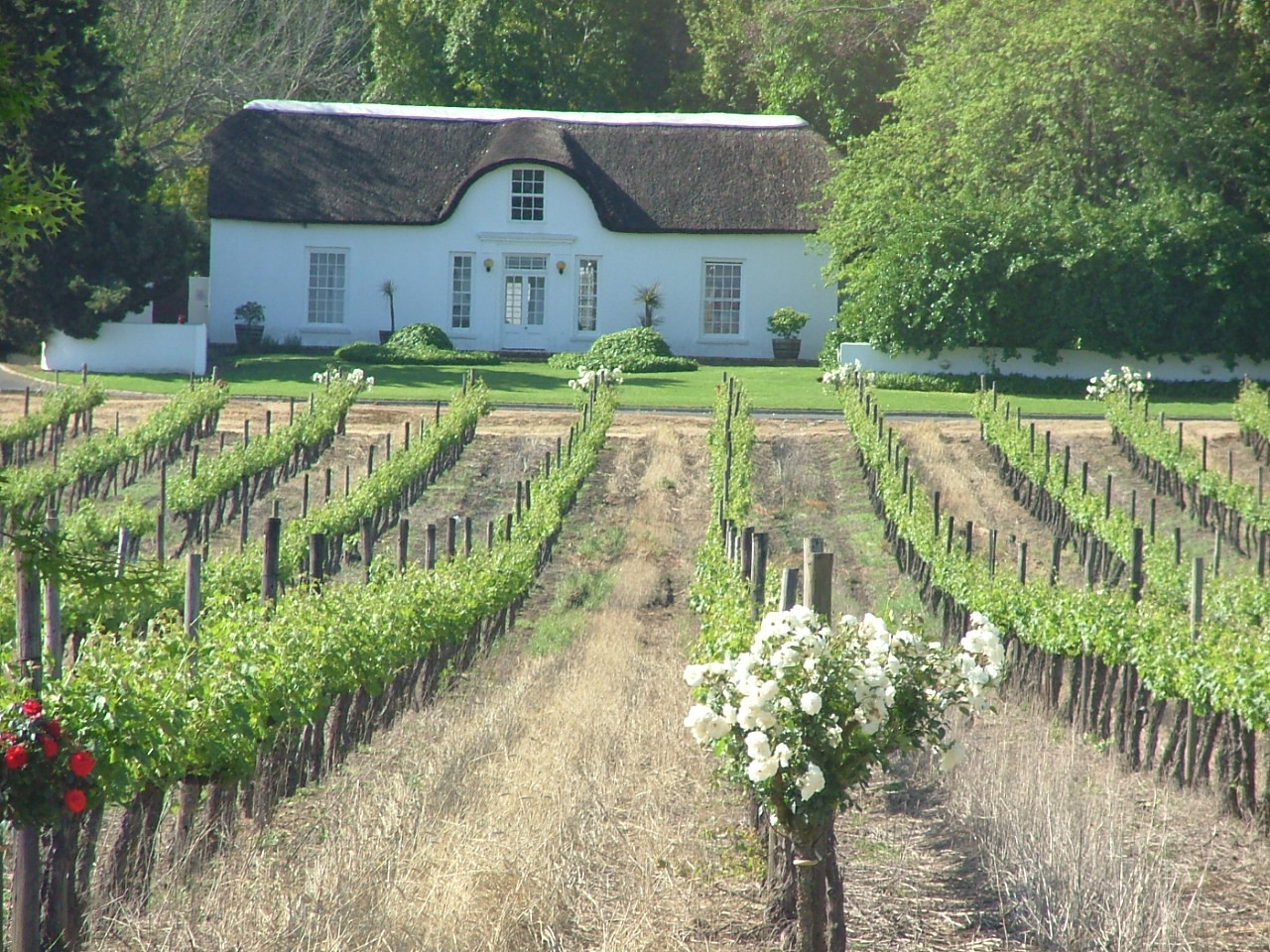
A vineyard in Stellenbosch

The Geographical Unit covers almost all of the South African Winelands, including the regions of Breede River Valley, Coastal Region, Klein Karoo and Olifants River. It also includes the otherwise unassigned southern districts of Bot River, Cape Agulhas, Overberg, Plettenberg Bay and Walker Bay, and the wards of Cederberg, Ceres, Herbertsdale, Prince Albert Valley, Ruiterbosch and Swartberg.

=== Bot River (Botrivier) ===
There are two wineries on the banks of the 'butter' river, Goedvertrouw and Beaumont Wines.

=== Cape Agulhas ===
The southern tip of Africa, where the Atlantic meets the Indian Ocean, offers a unique terroir where Sauvignon blanc thrives, particularly in the ward of Elim.

=== Overberg ===
The Overberg district (a part of Cape South Coast region) lies south of Paarl, features cool maritime breezes, and produces Sauvignon blanc, Chardonnay, and Pinot noir. It contains key production wards like Elgin and Klein River.

=== Plettenberg Bay ===
Newly declared WO that is home to Bramon Estate, who was known for a sparkling Sauvignon blanc.

=== Walker Bay ===
West of Cape Agulhas, this coastal district produces some high-quality wines from the Burgundy varieties. Hemel-en-Aarde Valley, Sunday's Glen and Upper Hemel-en-Aarde Valley were recently declared as wards.

== Cape Winelands ==
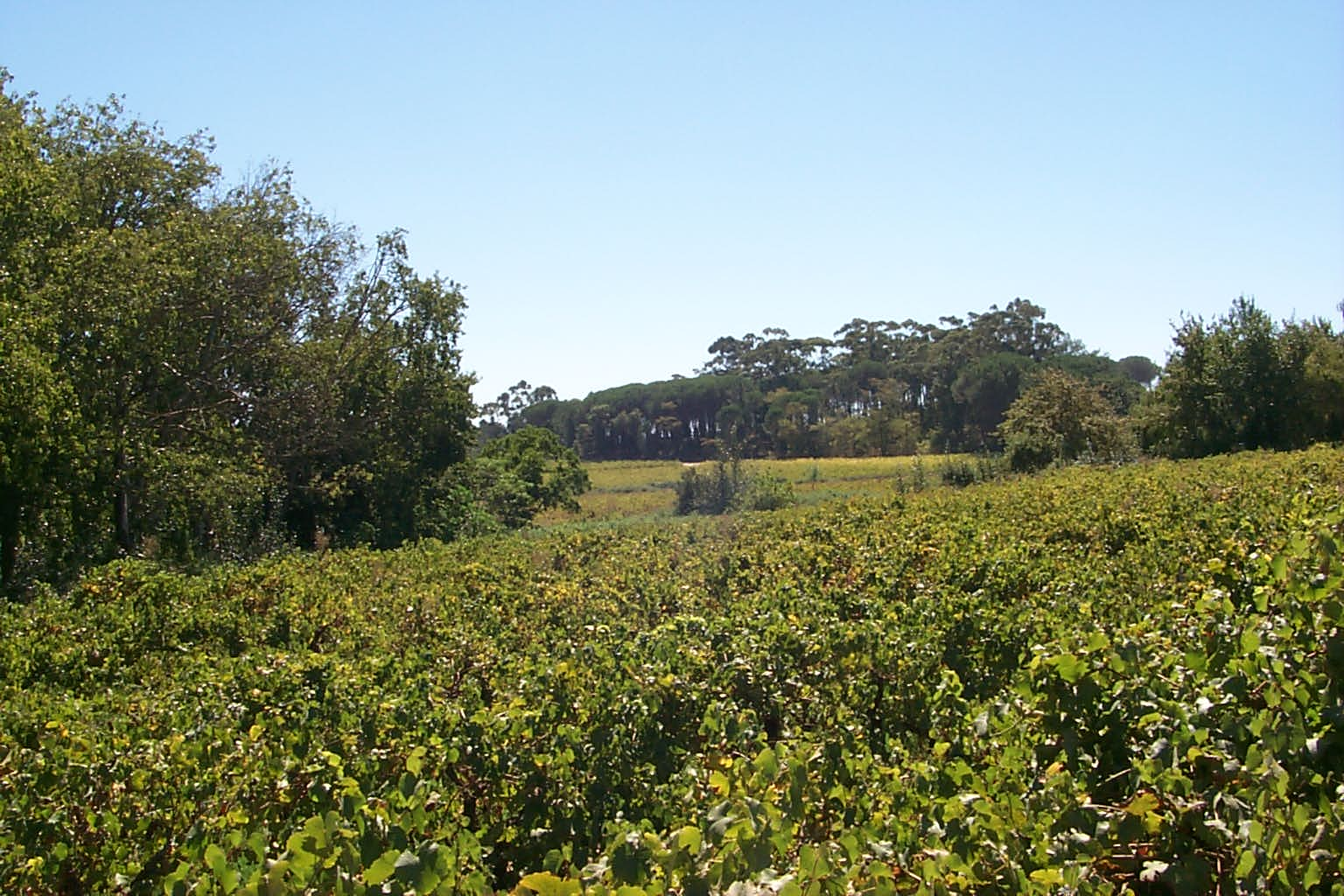
Cape Winelands - vineyards around Stellenbosch

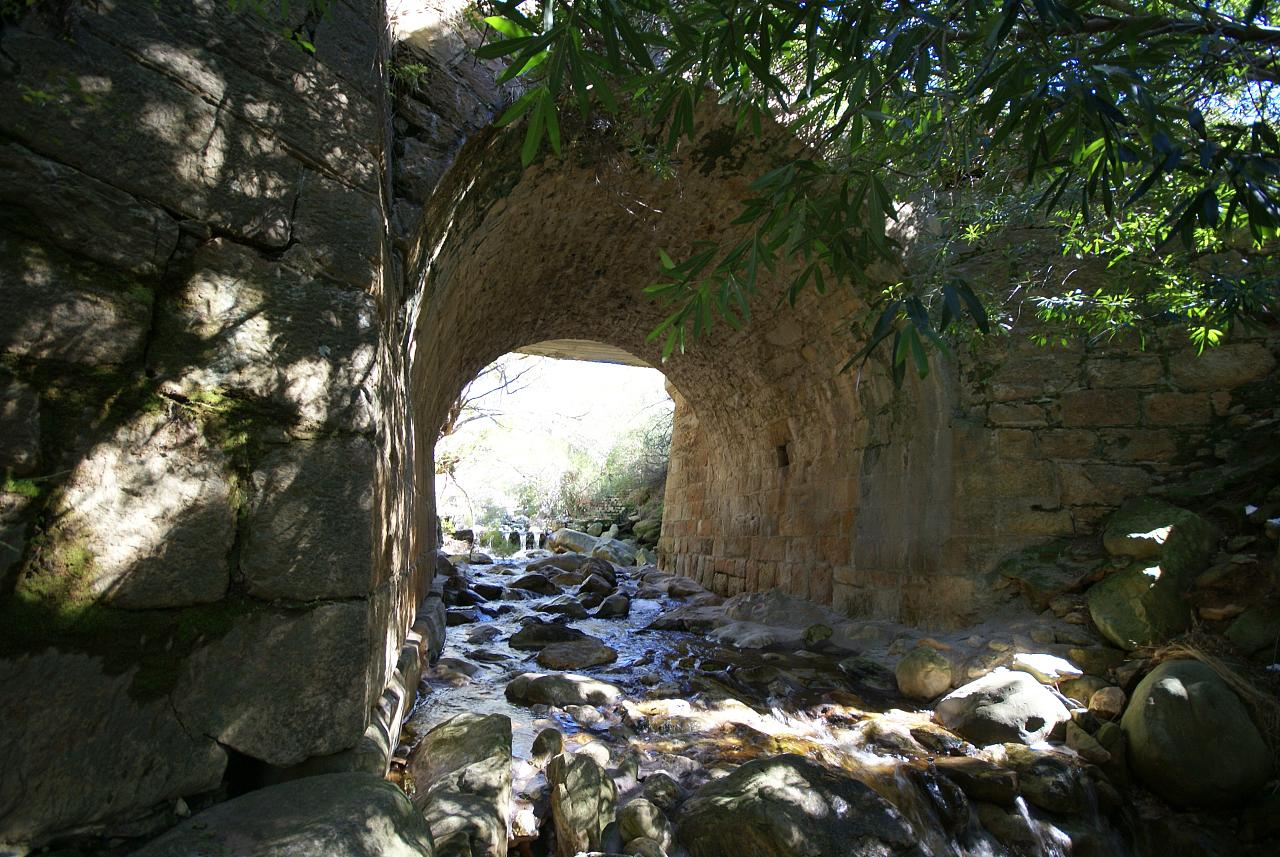
Jan Joubert's Gat bridge is situated on the Franschhoek Mountain pass in Cape Winelands.

The Cape Winelands is a region of the Western Cape Province of South Africa. It is the largest wine-producing region in South Africa and is divided into six main wine regions, each offering its own unique wine route. Constantia, Stellenbosch, Franschhoek, Paarl, Robertson and Wellington are the most popular. The geographic area is generally referred to locally as the Boland, meaning uplands in Afrikaans.

Constantia Valley wine region is situated in mountainous surroundings and is home to some of the oldest wine estates in the country.

Stellenbosch wine region is well known in the Cape. In 1971, the first official wine route was founded by Frans Malan of Simonsig, Spatz Sperling of Delheim, and Niel Joubert of Spier.

Franschhoek valley wine region was settled over 300 years ago by the French Huguenots. Set against the backdrop of the Franschhoek and Drakenstein mountains, the village has over 30 wine farms.

The Cape Winelands and their cultural landscape were added to the UNESCO World Heritage Tentative List on 24 June 2004 in the Cultural category. The tentative listing title was later updated to "Early Farmsteads of the Cape Winelands".

== See also ==
- Cape Winelands District Municipality - an administrative region
- Wine regions of South Africa
