= 1778 in South Africa =

- Decades: 1780s; 1790s
- See also: List of years in South Africa

The following lists events that happened during 1778 in South Africa.

== Incumbents ==
Governor of the Cape of Good Hope - Joachim van Plettenberg

== Events ==
- The VOC extends the Cape Colony's eastern border to Greater Fish & Bushmans Rivers, triggering future anti-colonial wars.
- Gcaleka theAmaXhosa chief dies. Ngqika succeeds under Ndlambe's regency. Rharhabe exploits the power vacuum but is banished to the north.
- Joachim van Plettenberg departs on an expedition to explore remote areas, encountering Khoikhoi after ten days. He erects a 2m slate beacon at a bay, renaming it Plettenberg Bay.
- Joachim van Plettenberg finds farmers in grassy plains, and notes the Khoikhoi are living on farms. He records the farmers' complaints about livestock theft by "Bushmen-Hottentots."
- The Cloete family begin ownership of Groot Constantia.
- The sweet wines of Constantia receive international acclaim and became known throughout the world as “Constantia Wyn”.
