= David Mayhew =

David Mayhew may refer to:

- David R. Mayhew (born 1937), American political scientist and Yale professor
- David Mayhew (banker) (born 1940), British banker
- David Mayhew (racing driver) (born 1982), American stock car racing driver
