= St John Hornby =

British printer (1867 – 1946)

Charles Harold St John Hornby (25 June 1867 – 1946) was a founding partner of W. H. Smith, deputy vice-chairman of the NSPCC, and founder and owner of the Ashendene Press.

== Early life ==
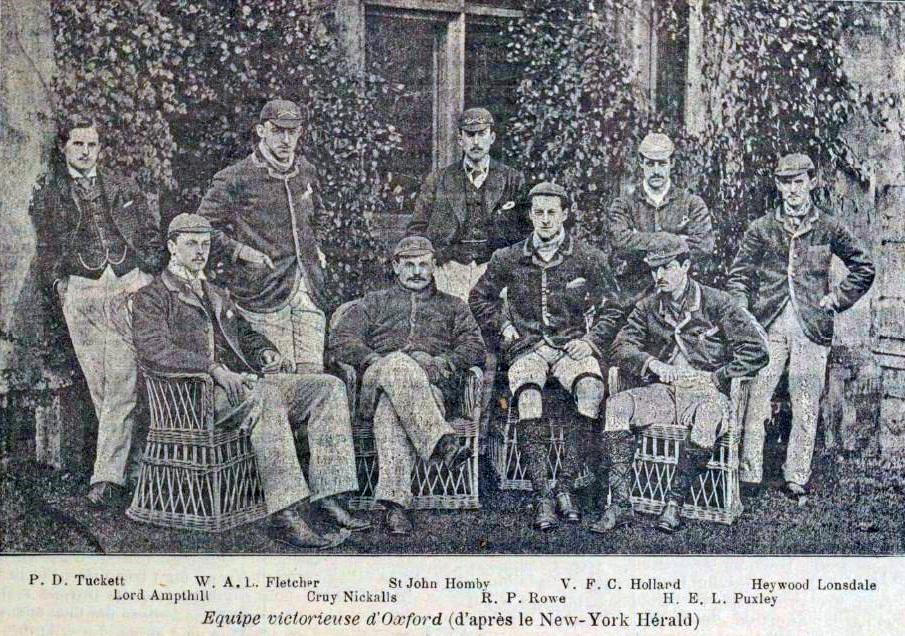
The 1890 Oxford rowing team, Hornby is standing at the back row

Charles Harold St John (pronounced 'Sin-jun') Hornby was born on 25 June 1867 at Much Dewchurch, Herefordshire, the eldest son of the Reverend Charles Edward Hornby, then a curate, and his wife, Harriet, daughter of the Revd Henry Turton, who was the vicar of Betley, Staffordshire.

He was educated at Harrow and New College, Oxford, where he received a bachelor's degree in classics. While attending Oxford, he rowed in the stroke position in both his college's and the University's rowing crews, and was a member of the crew that won the 1890 University Boat Race.

== Career ==
In 1892, Hornby was called to the bar, but his friend Freddy Smith (they had spent a year together in 1890–91 travelling the world) offered him a partnership in WH Smith, the family business.

In 1900, Hornby met Emery Walker and Sydney Cockerell (then William Morris' secretary at the Kelmscott Press). Together, they encouraged and instructed Hornby and helped in devising two typefaces for his own use, Subiaco and Ptolemy.

== Honours ==
Hornby was High Sheriff of the County of London from 1906–07.

Coat of arms of St John Hornby
Motto Crede Cornu

== Legacy ==
The National Portrait Gallery has a 1923 sanguine and white chalk drawing of Hornby by Sir William Rothenstein.

== Personal life ==
Hornby married Cicely Rachel Emily Barclay, the daughter of Charles Barclay, a director of the National Provincial Bank, and Charlotte Cassandra Cherry, on 19 January 1898.

They had homes at Shelley House, Chelsea, London, and Chantmarle, Dorset.

They had three sons and two daughters:

- Michael Charles St John Hornby (1899–1987)
- Sir Roger Antony Hornby (1904–1987), senior partner at the stockbrokers Cazenove
- Dame Rosamund Holland-Martin (1914–2001), who led the NSPCC from (1969–1988), and was married to Admiral Sir Deric Holland-Martin
