= Charles D. Harman =

British banker and businessman

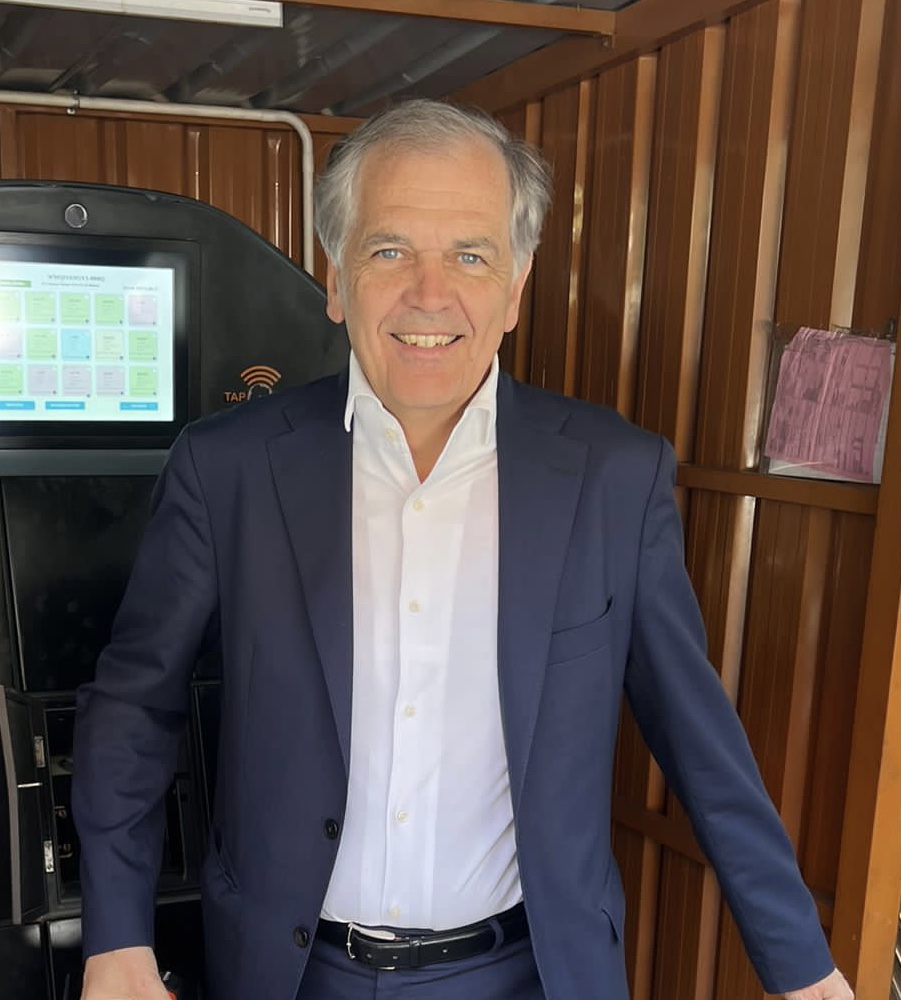
- Born: 1 January 1963 (age 63); London, United Kingdom
- Education: Eton; Magdalen College, Oxford
- Occupations: Businessperson, investment banker
- Spouse: Charlotte Harman
- Children: 3

Charles D. Harman (born January 1, 1963) is a British banker and businessman. He was vice chairman of J.P.Morgan Cazenove in 2015–2022. He has been a member of council of the University of Oxford since 2018.

== Early life and education ==
Charles D. Harman was born in London. His father, Robert Harman, was a King's Counsel and criminal barrister. In 1984, he graduated from Magdalen College, Oxford with a first class degree in philosophy, Politics and Economics.

While at Oxford he and a group of friends paddled a small boat 1,200 miles down the Niger River in Africa, tracing the route of the early nineteenth century Scottish explorer Mungo Park.

== Career ==
Harman joined Credit Suisse First Boston in 1984 and spent three years working in its Tokyo office. He returned to London in 1990 to become part of a team focusing on new markets in Central and Eastern Europe. In 1995 Harman joined MC Securities, becoming CEO in 1996. From 1997 to 2001 he was managing director and Head of Emerging Europe investment banking at Donaldson, Lufkin & Jenrette.

In 2001, Harman joined Cazenove, which became part of a joint venture with J.P.Morgan. In 2008, he was appointed Head of Corporate Finance of J.P.Morgan Cazenove and a year later, Head of UK Investment Banking for J.P.Morgan.

In 2011, he was appointed CEO of BXR Partners, an emerging markets investment group co-founded with Zdenek Bakala. He returned to J.P.Morgan Cazenove as vice chairman from 2015 to 2022.

Since 2015, he has served as chair of Peters Fraser & Dunlop, a UK literary agency and publisher. From 2011, he has been co-owner and director of Klein Constantia an historic winery in South Africa. He is also director of Oxford University Endowment Management Ltd.

== Personal life ==
Harman lives in London and Oxfordshire, UK. A veteran cyclist, he has participated regularly in the Cape Town Cycle Tour. He is married to Charlotte Harman, an art historian and teacher, with whom he has two sons and a daughter.

== Public service ==
Harman is a member of council and a trustee of the University of Oxford. He was appointed deputy chair of council in 2020.

== Philanthropy ==
Harman is a trustee of the Big Give Trust (UK match funding charity), Positive Women/First Year Africa (a charity seeking to reduce child morbidity in Africa), as well as a co-founder of Moe Kolo (Ukraine mental health NGO) and MedAid International (UK not-for-profit company which provides medical support to Ukraine).

== Views and opinions ==
In May 2024, Harman was one of 121 business leaders who signed a public letter supporting Labour's economic policy ahead of the July 2024 General Elections.
