= Deric Holland-Martin =

Royal Navy Admiral (1906–1977)

Admiral Sir Deric Holland-Martin GCB DSO DSC* DL
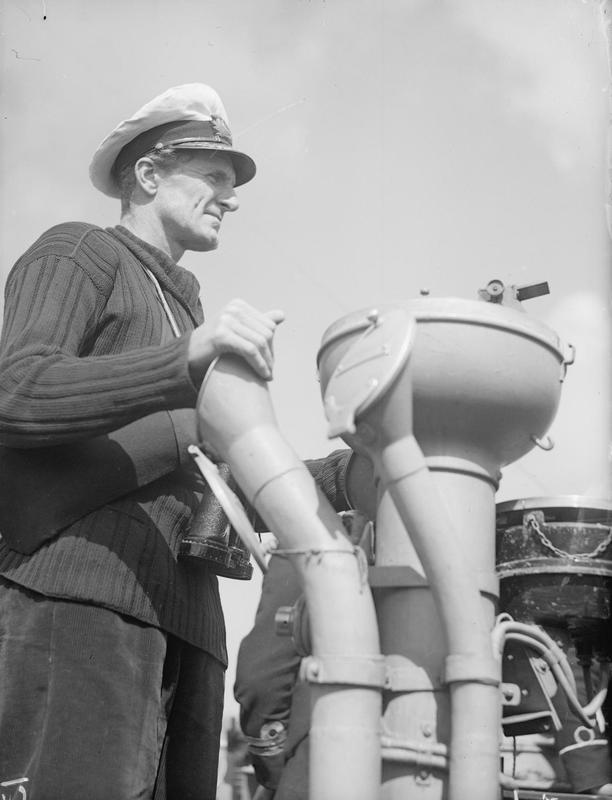
- Commander Holland-Martin on the bridge of the HMS Nubian, off the coast of Malta in 1943
- Born: 10 April 1906; London, England
- Died: 6 January 1977 (aged 70); Kemerton, Worcestershire
- Spouse: Dame Rosamund Holland-Martin
- Military career
- Allegiance: United Kingdom
- Branch: Royal Navy
- Service years: 1920–1966
- Rank: Admiral
- Nickname: Deric
- Commands: Imperial Defence College (1964–66); Allied Forces Mediterranean (1961–64); Mediterranean Fleet (1961–64); Flag Officer, Air (Home) (1960–61); Second Sea Lord (1958–59); HMS Eagle (1953–54); 4th Destroyer Flotilla (1949–50); HMS Agincourt (1949–50); HMS Faulknor (1944); HMS Nubian (1942–43); HMS Holderness (1940); HMS Tartar (1939–40)
- Conflicts: Second World War
- Awards: Knight Grand Cross of the Order of the Bath; Distinguished Service Order; Distinguished Service Cross & Bar

Admiral Sir Douglas Eric Holland-Martin, GCB, DSO, DSC & Bar, DL (10 April 1906 – 6 January 1977) was a Royal Navy officer who served as Second Sea Lord and Chief of Naval Personnel from 1957 to 1959.

== Naval career ==
Educated at West Downs School, Holland-Martin entered the Royal Naval College, Osborne, in 1920. He played cricket for the Royal Navy between 1928 and 1933, including one first-class match against the Royal Air Force at The Oval. He later played a first-class match for the Combined Services cricket team against the touring New Zealanders at Portsmouth in 1937.

On the outbreak of the Second World War, Holland-Martin was executive officer of the destroyer HMS Tartar when his captain was taken ill and he was given the command. Later in the war he commanded the destroyers Holderness, Nubian and Faulknor.

After the war, Holland-Martin became Naval attaché to Argentina, Paraguay and Uruguay. He was appointed captain of the destroyer Agincourt in 1949 and then Director of Plans at the Admiralty in 1952. He took command of the aircraft carrier Eagle in 1954 and then became Flag Officer, Flotillas, Mediterranean in 1955.

Holland-Martin was made Second Sea Lord and Chief of Naval Personnel in 1957 and Commander-in-Chief, Mediterranean Fleet and NATO Commander Allied Forces Mediterranean in 1961. His final post was as Commandant of the Imperial Defence College in 1964. He retired in 1966.

== Later life ==
In retirement, Holland-Martin was appointed to the honorary post of Vice-Admiral of the United Kingdom for a term and also served as a Deputy Lieutenant in Hereford and Worcester.

== Family ==
In 1951 Holland-Martin married Rosamund Mary Hornby, daughter of St John Hornby. Rosamund became chairman of the National Society for the Prevention of Cruelty to Children and was appointed a Dame Commander of the Order of the British Empire in 1983 (however, she continued to style herself Lady Holland-Martin, rather than Dame Rosamund). The couple had a son and a daughter.

Military offices
Preceded by Sir Charles Lambe	Second Sea Lord; 1957–1959	Succeeded by Sir St John Tyrwhitt
Preceded by Sir Alexander Bingley	Commander-in-Chief, Mediterranean Fleet; 1961–1964	Succeeded by Sir John Hamilton
Preceded by Sir Hugh Constantine	Commandant of the Imperial Defence College; 1964–1966	Succeeded by Sir John Anderson
Honorary titles
Preceded by Sir Peter Reid	Vice-Admiral of the United Kingdom; 1973–1976	Succeeded by Sir Nigel Henderson
