= Antony Hornby =

British stockbroker at Cazenove

- Antony Hornby by Godfrey Argent, 1968.
- Born: Roger Antony Hornby; 5 February 1904
- Died: 20 December 1987 (aged 83)
- Education: Sandroyd School; Winchester College
- Alma mater: New College, Oxford
- Occupation: Stockbroker
- Board member of: Cazenove

Sir Roger Antony Hornby (5 February 1904 – 20 December 1987), was senior partner at the stockbrokers Cazenove.

== Early life ==
Roger Antony Hornby was born on 5 February 1904, the second son of St John Hornby and his wife Cicely Rachel Emily Barclay. He was educated at Sandroyd School. Winchester College and New College, Oxford.

== Career ==
Hornby was a senior partner at Cazenove. According to Anthony Hilton, he rebuilt Cazenove after the war, by subtly acknowledging his company's place in the City hierarchy. They considered themselves the leading broker, so Hornby had a golden rule - any other broker had to visit them, but Cazeove always visited their merchant banker clients. And up until the 1970s, no member of staff could visit a merchant bank without wearing a bowler hat. He was knighted in 1960.

Hornby was also president of Savoy Hotel Ltd.

== Personal life ==
Hornby married Lady Veronica Brenda Hamilton-Temple-Blackwood, daughter of Frederick Hamilton-Temple-Blackwood, 3rd Marquess of Dufferin and Ava, on 17 December 1931. They divorced in 1940.

In 1949, he married Lily Ernst, a former ballerina.

== Death ==
He died on 20 December 1987.
