= Alzheimer's Research UK =

Dementia research charity

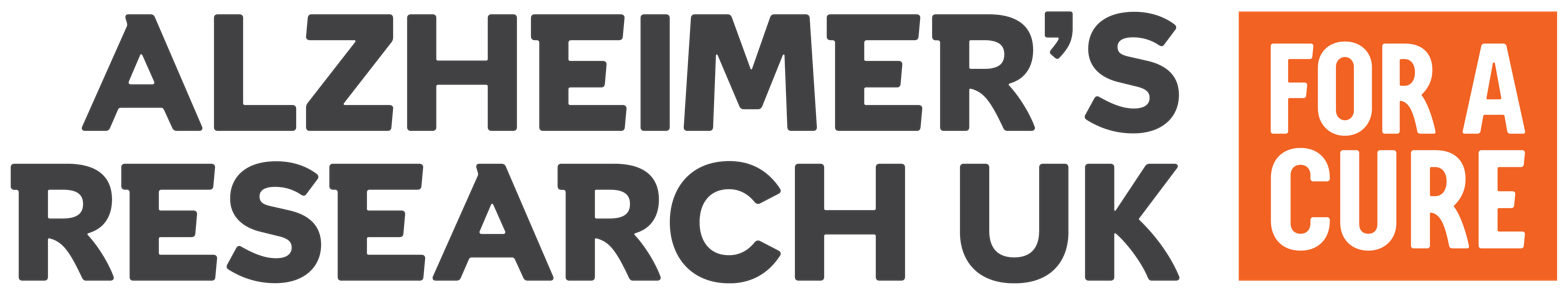
- Formation: 1992
- Type: Charitable organisation
- Purpose: Alzheimer's disease research Health policy
- Headquarters: 3 Riverside, Granta Park, Cambridge CB21 6AD
- Key people: Hilary Evans-Newton (Chief Executive) The Rt. Hon. The Lord Cameron of Chipping Norton PC (President) Gavin Patterson (Chair) Prof Sir John Hardy FRS (Vice President) David Mayhew CBE (Vice President) Prof Jonathan Schott (Chief Medical Officer) Prof James Rowe (Chair of Scientific Advisory Board)
- Revenue: £56.9m (2024)
- Website: alzheimersresearchuk.org
- Formerly called: Alzheimer's Research Trust

Alzheimer's Research UK (ARUK) is a dementia research charity in the United Kingdom, founded in 1992 as the Alzheimer's Research Trust.

Alzheimer’s Research UK funds scientific studies to find ways to treat, diagnose and prevent all forms of dementia, including Alzheimer's disease, vascular dementia, dementia with Lewy bodies and frontotemporal dementia.

As of 2024, Alzheimer's Research UK has funded 1,275 research projects across the UK and internationally, and has committed more than £237 million to dementia research.

Alzheimer's Research UK is a member of the Association of Medical Research Charities.

== History ==
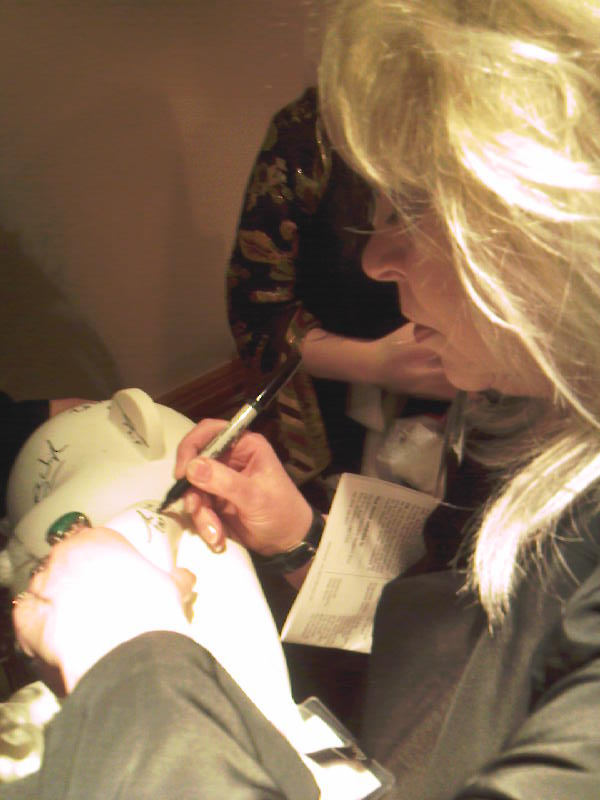
Tanith Lee raising money for the Alzheimer's Research Trust as part of the Match It For Pratchett campaign 2011

In 1998, the trust awarded its first major grant of £500,000 to a team led by distinguished scientist Dr Michel Goedert in Cambridge.

In March 2008, author Terry Pratchett, who had the disease, donated one million US dollars to the trust.

In February 2010, the Alzheimer's Research Trust released the Dementia 2010 report, revealing new evidence of the prevalence, economic cost and research funding for dementia and other major conditions.

In February 2011, Alzheimer's Research Trust was renamed Alzheimer's Research UK.

In 2014, the charity launched its Defeat Dementia campaign, which aimed to fast-track discoveries in dementia research and bring about potential new treatments sooner. This included the establishing of a Drug Discovery Alliance, a network of three dedicated Drug Discovery Institutes, all working to translate new findings from academic research into potential treatments as quickly as possible.

In 2016, Alzheimer's Research UK became a founding funder of the UK Dementia Research Institute, a £290 million joint investment with the Medical Research Council and Alzheimer's Society.

In 2017, former Prime Minister David Cameron was appointed president of Alzheimer's Research UK, an unpaid voluntary position. Cameron initially served as President from January 2017 - November 2023. He stood down from the role when he became Foreign Secretary in November 2023, while remaining a Patron of the charity. In February 2025, Cameron returned to the position of President.

Alzheimer's Research UK and Alzheimer's Society were the joint Charity of the Year for the 2019 Virgin Money London Marathon. The Dementia Revolution campaign raised £4 million, supporting research at the UK Dementia Research Institute.

In 2021, Alzheimer's Research UK launched a public awareness campaign, called Think Brain Health. The campaign aims to highlight the importance of good brain health, and how making small lifestyle changes can help reduce the risk of dementia in later life. In 2023, the charity launched an online check-in tool to support people to protect their brain health.

In 2023, estimates made by Alzheimer's Research UK suggested that clinical trials for lecanemab and donanemab would only find 575,000 people living in the UK eligible for treatment. The challenge was, these people needed a diagnosis but the National Health Service couldn't deliver at that scale. This was because of the risks of side effects, few PET scanners to diagnose Alzheimer's and limited skilled professionals to perform lumbar punctures. Within the organisation in 2023, David Mayhew CBE (former Chairman of JP Morgan Cazenove) became Vice President of Alzheimer's Research UK. Prior to his role as Vice President, Mayhew was Chair of the Board of Trustees at Alzheimer's Research UK for more than a decade.

In 2024, Prof Sir John Hardy became a Vice President of Alzheimer’s Research UK. His work has led to significant advances in the understanding of Alzheimer’s disease, laying the groundwork for the first treatments that can slow the disease.

In February 2025, Gavin Patterson, former President and Chief Revenue Officer of Salesforce and CEO of BT Group, was appointed Chair of the Board of Trustees for the charity.

The charity reported a total income of £56.9m for the 12-month period ending March 2024, £34.6m committed to charitable activities.

== Charitable Activities ==
=== Research ===
Alzheimer's Research UK funds research across three key areas, which are to treat, diagnose and prevent dementia.

The charity’s research looks into all forms of dementia, including Alzheimer’s disease, vascular dementia, dementia with Lewy bodies and frontotemporal dementia, as well as some rarer causes.

The charity has funded over 1,293 dementia research projects in the UK and globally, across 134 organisations.

=== Research discoveries ===
- In 2008, Alzheimer’s Research UK-funded researchers from King’s College London revealed that antipsychotic medication, commonly prescribed to people with dementia, can worsen symptoms and double the risk of death when used long term. The clinical findings contributed to the November 2009 Government report that pledged to cut the use of antipsychotics by two-thirds, and the high-profile ongoing campaign since.
- In 2009, Alzheimer's Research UK scientists discovered two new genes related to Alzheimer's. Over 16,000 people took part in this study.
- In 2012 a project led by scientists at UCL’s Institute or Neurology, with funding from Alzheimer's Research UK, resulted in the discovery of a rare genetic mutation that increases the risk of Alzheimer’s disease. The international team studied data from more than 25,000 people to link a rare variant of the TREM2 gene – which is known to play a role in the immune system – to a higher risk of Alzheimer’s. The study has had major implications for understanding the causes of the disease.

== Awareness raising ==
Alzheimer's Research UK runs a Dementia Research Infoline, available for people who have questions about dementia and research into the condition. The charity also produces free dementia health information booklets for the public. Alzheimer's Research UK also encourages people to sign up to take part in dementia research, through Join Dementia Research. This service is run by the National Institute for Health and Research in partnership with Alzheimer’s Research UK, Alzheimer’s Society and Alzheimer Scotland.

The charity has run a number of public awareness campaigns to challenge misconceptions surrounding dementia. This includes its #ShareTheOrange campaign, which aimed to improve understanding of the diseases that cause dementia and how research can overcome them. Hollywood-actor Samuel L Jackson featured in the campaign’s most recent film.

In 2021, Alzheimer's Research UK launched its ongoing Think Brain Health campaign to raise awareness of the steps people can take to reduce their risk of dementia.

== Campaigning and influence ==
As well as funding biomedical research, Alzheimer's Research UK campaigns to ensure people with dementia and research into the condition remain a political priority.

Following the Conservatives’ 2019 election promise to double dementia research funding to over £160 million a year, the charity has been calling on government to deliver on the pledge.

In 2021, the charity delivered a petition, signed by 51,000 people and backed by Dame Judi Dench, to then Prime Minister Boris Johnson, urging him to outline how the government plans to deliver the doubling of dementia research funding.

In March 2023, Hilary Evans-Newton, the charity’s Chief Executive, was appointed co-chair of the government’s Dame Barbara Windsor Dementia Goals programme.

== See also ==
- Alzheimer's Society
- Dementia UK
