= Rosamund Holland-Martin =

Chairman of the Central Executive Committee of the NSPCC
- In office 1969–1988

Dame Rosamund Mary Holland-Martin, DBE, DL (née Hornby; 26 June 1914 in London – 18 June 2001) was a British long-term leader and fund-raiser for the National Society for the Prevention of Cruelty to Children (NSPCC).

== NSPCC ==
Holland-Martin was part of the NSPCC for over 50 years, serving as chairman of the Central Executive Committee for nearly two decades (1969–1988). During her decades with the charity, she played a crucial role in the establishment of the NSPCC's position as Britain's leading child protection organisation and helped to engineer its development into a modern professional body.

Dame Holland-Martin played a significant role in fund-raising for the organisation's 1984 centenary appeal, the largest charitable appeal ever planned and executed in the UK, which exceeded its fundraising goal. Holland-Martin was vital to the success of the appeal, including, alongside the NSPCC's president Princess Margaret, persuading the Duke of Westminster to chair the Appeal. Due to its success, the Appeal became a blueprint for other charities, such as Great Ormond Street Hospital. The Centenary Charter set the agenda for the future direction of the society.

After 19 years in the chair she retired in 1988, but she never lost interest and she continued to attend meetings and speak whenever invited. By the time she left, the NSPCC had increased the funds it raised from under £500,000 in 1947 to more than £20 million a year.

== Family life ==
She was the fifth child of St John Hornby, a longtime member of the central executive committee and then deputy vice-chairman of the NSPCC, and his wife, Cecily.

In 1942, Rosamund Hornby joined the Women's Voluntary Services (WVS), giving up her job as assistant matron of the girls' school which had been evacuated in 1939 to Chantmarle, the family home in Dorset. The WVS was led by Stella, Dowager Marchioness of Reading.

== Personal life ==
In 1951, Hornby married Captain Douglas Eric "Deric" Holland-Martin (later Admiral Sir Deric Holland-Martin), a naval officer (10 April 1906 - 1977), fourth son of Robert Martin Holland-Martin.

They had two children, Emma and Benjamin, who both work for the NSPCC. Lady Holland-Martin went twice to Valletta, Malta, while her husband was Commander-in-Chief of Allied Forces in the Mediterranean. They lived in Bell's Castle, Kemerton, Worcestershire.

== Later life ==
After her husband's death in 1977, she took on his former role as a Deputy Lieutenant for Hereford and Worcester. She also became a governor of Malvern School and chair of the Tewkesbury Abbey Appeal.

She continued to be a member of the NSPCC central executive committee until 1992 and later became a vice-president. For her work for the Women's Voluntary Service she was appointed OBE. For her numerous subsequent posts in public service was advanced, in 1983, to DBE.

== Death ==
She died in 2001, eight days before her 87th birthday, and was interred near her home in Worcestershire.
