= HMS Holderness (L48) =

Destroyer of the Royal Navy

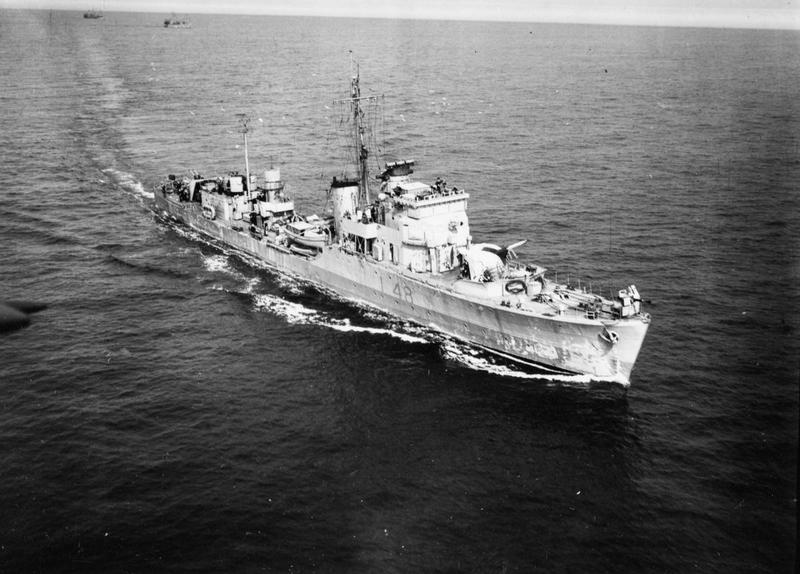
- HMS Holderness underway, c1941 (IWM)

History

United Kingdom
- Name: HMS Holderness
- Ordered: 11 March 1939
- Builder: Swan Hunter, Wallsend
- Laid down: 29 June 1939
- Launched: 8 February 1940
- Completed: 10 August 1940
- Identification: Pennant number: L48
- Fate: Scrapped, 1956
- Badge: On a Field red a Fox's mask holding in the mouth a hunting horn gold

General characteristics
- Class & type: Type I Hunt-class destroyer
- Displacement: 1,050 long tons (1,070 t) standard; 1,430 long tons (1,450 t) full load
- Length: 85.3 m (279 ft 10 in) o/a
- Beam: 9.6 m (31 ft 6 in)
- Draught: 2.51 m (8 ft 3 in)
- Propulsion: 2 Admiralty 3-drum boilers; 2 shaft Parsons geared turbines, 19,000 shp (14,000 kW)
- Speed: 27 knots (31 mph; 50 km/h); 25.5 kn (29.3 mph; 47.2 km/h) full
- Range: 3,600 nmi (6,700 km) at 14 kn (26 km/h)
- Complement: 164
- Armament: 4 × QF 4 in Mark XVI guns on twin mounts Mk. XIX; 4 × QF 2 pdr Mk. VIII on quad mount MK.VII; 2 × 20 mm Oerlikons on single mounts P Mk. III; 110 depth charges, 2 throwers, 3 racks

HMS Holderness was a Type I Hunt-class destroyer of the Royal Navy which served in World War II. She was scrapped in 1956.

== Service history ==
Holderness was ordered on 21 March 1939 under the 1939 Programme. She was laid down on 29 June 1939 at Swan Hunter, launched on 8 February 1940 and completed on 10 August 1940. The whole of her wartime service was with the 21st Destroyer Flotilla escorting east coast convoys. She saw no foreign service.

On 10 March 1941 Holderness brought down an enemy aircraft.

On 20 February 1942 she was engaged in an action with German Schnellboote sinking one of them and taking 18 prisoners.

She was adopted by the civil community of Amman Valley in Wales as part of Warship Week in 1942.

She earned battle honours during the Second World War for the North Sea 1942–1945.

Following the war she was transferred to the Reserve Fleet at Harwich in 1946. She remained there until sold to Thos. W. Ward for scrap. She arrived at the breakers yard in Preston on 20 November 1956.

== Publications ==
- Colledge, J. J.; Warlow, Ben (2006) [1969]. Ships of the Royal Navy: The Complete Record of All Fighting Ships of the Royal Navy from the 15th Century to the Present (3rd Rev ed.). London: Chatham Publishing. ISBN 978-1-86176-281-8. OCLC 67375475.
- English, John (1987). The Hunts: A history of the design, development and careers of the 86 destroyers of this class built for the Royal and Allied Navies during World War II. World Ship Society. ISBN 0-905617-44-4.
