= Klein Constantia =

South African wine estate and vineyards

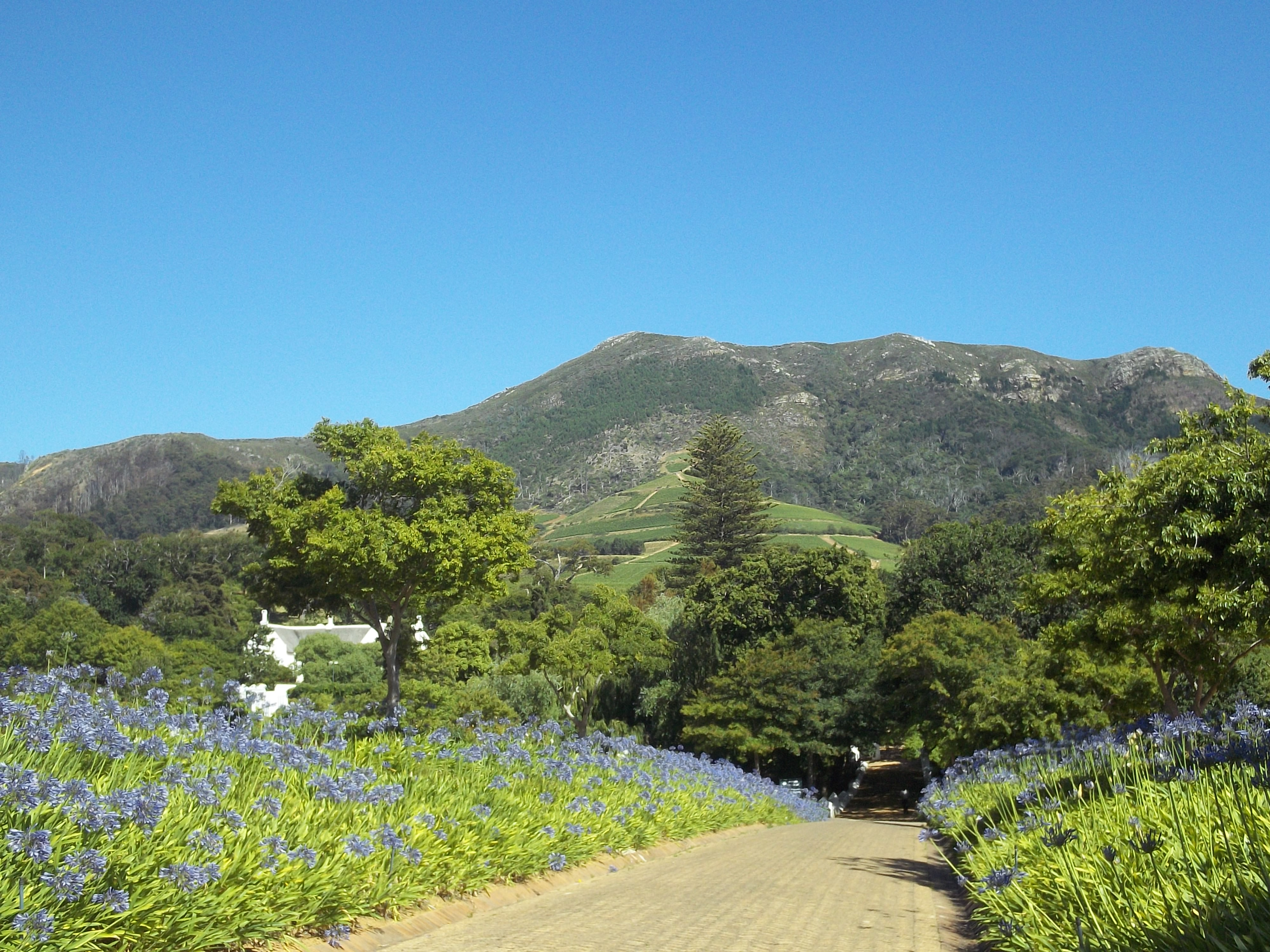
- The road leading to the Klein Constantia Manor House, Cellar and Tasting Room

- Location within Cape Town
- 34°2′20″S 18°24′47.64″E
- Location: Constantia, Cape Town, South Africa.

History
- Built: 17th century

Site notes
- Architectural style: Cape Dutch

Klein Constantia is a wine estate in the suburb of Constantia in Cape Town, South Africa.

== History ==
Constantia, the first wine farm in Southern Africa, was established in 1685 by the VOC Governor of the Cape Simon van der Stel, and was used to produce wine as well as other fruit and vegetables and cattle farming. Van der Stel, a keen viticulturist, had been the first to recognize the potential of the decomposed granite soil in the sheltered valley facing False Bay and bounded by sea on both sides after he had had soil samples collected from all over the Cape. He chose this area to plant his vines and named it Constantia.

Following van der Stel's death in 1712 the estate was broken up and sold in three parts (Groot Constantia; Klein Constantia; and Bergvliet). Johannes Colijin, a son of a freed slave, ended up owning the Klein Constantia, which was renamed Hoop op Constantia. Johannes resumed winemaking from 1718 and began shipping around the world.

== The Cloete family ==
In 1778 the portion of the estate surrounding van der Stel's mansion was sold to the Cloete family, who planted extensive vineyards of mostly Frontignac, Pontac, red and white Muscadel and a little Steen (Chenin blanc) and extended and improved the mansion. On the death of Hendrik Cloete in 1818, the estate was split, and the upper portion became the property of Cloete's son Johan Gerhard Cloete under the name Klein Constantia.

== Constantia wine ==
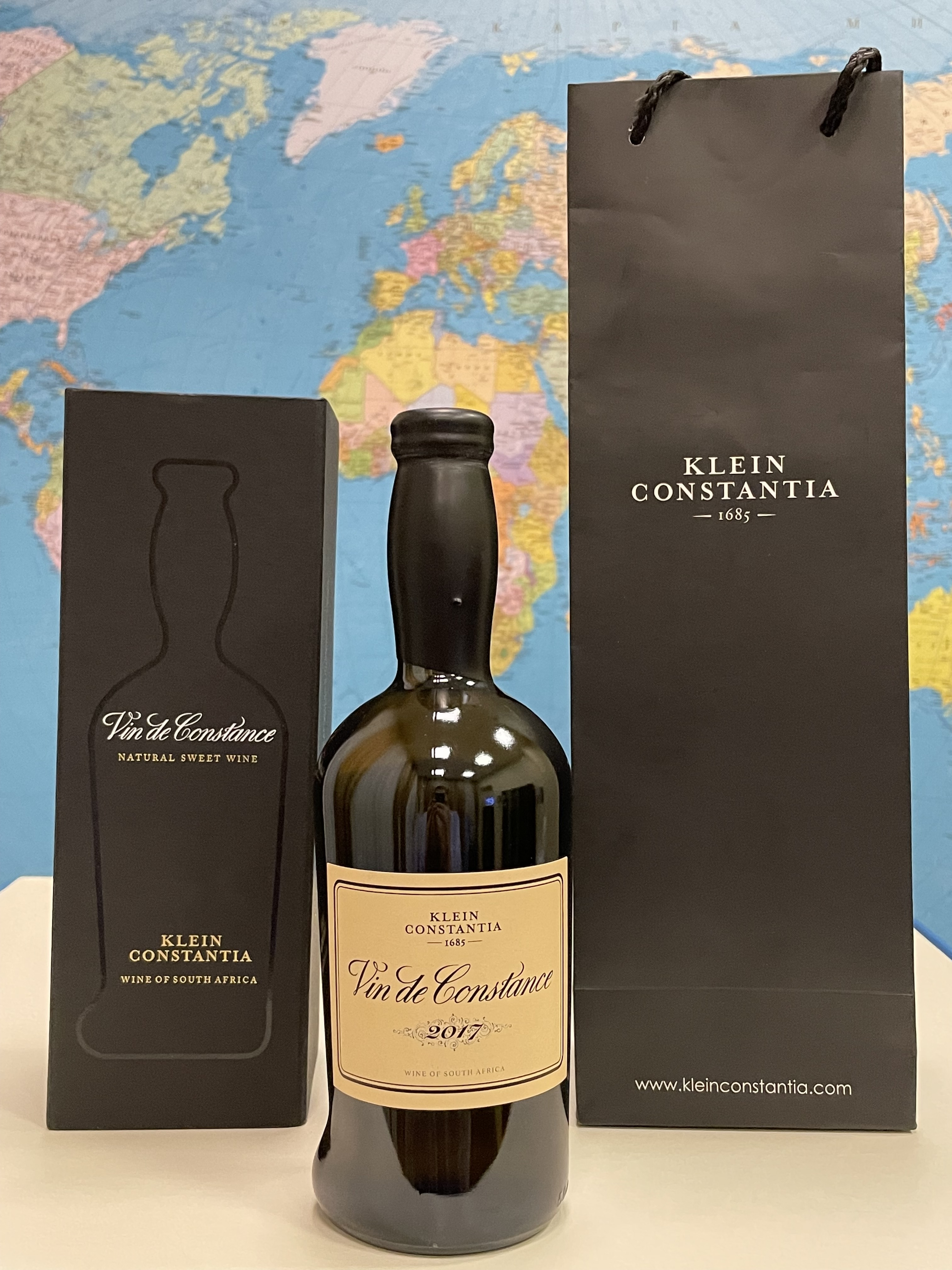
A bottle of Vin de Constance

It was under the Cloete family ownership that Constantia's sweet dessert wine "Vin de Constance" made primarily from vine-dried Muscat de Frontignan grapes reached the height of its fame. Napoleon Bonaparte had as much as 1,126 liters (297 gallons) of Constantia wine shipped in wooden casks each year to Longwood House, his home in exile on St Helena from 1815 until his death in 1821. The Count de las Cases reported that, on his deathbed, Napoleon refused everything offered to him but a glass of Constantia wine.

In Sense and Sensibility, Jane Austen's character Mrs Jennings recommends a little Constantia for "its healing powers on a disappointed heart".

In Charles Dickens' last (and unfinished) novel, The Mystery of Edwin Drood, Constantia wine is served to the reverend Septimus by his mother. "As, whenever the Reverend Septimus fell a-musing, his good mother took it to be an infallible sign that he ‘wanted support,’ the blooming old lady made all haste to the dining-room closet, to produce from it the support embodied in a glass of Constantia and a home-made biscuit."

In Charles Baudelaire's Les fleurs du mal poem XXVI entitled sed non satiata Baudelaire compares the charms of his beloved to the pleasures of the night and Constantia wine: "Even more than Constantia, than opium, than Nuits, I prefer the elixer of your mouth, where love performs its slow dance."

== The De Villiers family ==
In 1913 Klein Constantia was purchased by Abraham Lochner de Villiers, a wealthy milliner from Paarl, and his American heiress wife, Clara Hussey. The house and its estate were restored when the couple made the Klein Constantia manor house their home during the year before the First World War. Life at Klein Constantia took an exuberant turn. "It was like something out of the Great Gatsby" said one enthusiastic guest. "You cannot imagine the glamour of it all".

Dressed in the latest fashion, Clara, whose grandfather was the first Pittsburgh steel tycoon, threw parties which were the talk of Cape Town, where Russian caviar was served, swathed in barrels of ice, together with oysters and smoked salmon; orchestras played, and peacocks strolled on the lawns.

The Pittsburgh fortune was not confined to fine motor cars and caviar. Abraham and Clara set about the transformation of Klein Constantia with style and determination. Fine furniture and paintings were brought for the house, they added a dining hall, with a minstrel's gallery, a private chapel, and then a classical pavilion which stood beside a large swimming pool set in landscaped gardens. Winemaking continued to play an important role and the farm produced good wine and excellent port.

Devoted to Klein Constantia as they were, Clara and Abraham were determined that the farm should remain within the de Villiers family. As they had no children of their own, their nephew Jan, son of Rocco and Annie de Villiers of Paarl, was designated as their heir, and sent to the University of California at Berkeley for two years to study viticulture. When Jan returned to Klein Constantia he remained until Abraham's death in 1930, when he then left for the Transvaal, returning only in 1955 when his Aunt Clara died, whereupon he inherited the property. With the passing of Clara Hussey de Villiers, the era of glamour and splendour came to an end.

== The Jooste Era ==
In 1980 Duggie Jooste bought Klein Constantia, redeveloped it, and with the help of Professor Chris Orferr of Stellenbosch University and winemaker, Ross Gower, created and began selling a new recreated version of Constantia wine made from Muscat Blanc à Petits Grains. Duggie's son, Lowell, joined the team and together they helped to revive Klein Constantia's wines and the entire estate: completing work on a full cellar and tasting room by the mid 1980s.

Klein Constantia released its first vintage of the modern era in 1986 to much critical acclaim and quickly developed a reputation as one of South Africa's top wine estates.

== New ownership ==
In May 2011 the Jooste family sold Klein Constantia to Czech businessman Zdenĕk Bakala and Charles D. Harman from the UK. Both have been regular visitors to South Africa for the past twenty years, and together with their families now divide their time between their respective homes in Europe and Cape Town. Bakala is co-founder of the global diversified investment group, BXR, of which Harman is the CEO.

In June 2012, Klein Constantia merged with Stellenbosch-based vineyard, Anwilka (formerly co-owned by Lowell Jooste, Hubert de Boüard and Bruno Prats) and Klein Constantia welcomed two new shareholders in de Boüard, of Château Angélus and Prats, formerly of Château Cos d'Estournel.

== Wine production ==
Klein Constantia is known for its production of white wines, including Sauvignon blanc and Riesling, and its revival of the 18th and 19th century Constantia dessert wine Vin de Constance. Vin de Constance has consistently scored over 90 points in Wine Spectator Magazine and other rating publications like Robert Parker and in September 2012 Neal Martin of eRobertParker awarded Vin de Constane 2007 a 97-point rating.

Klein Constantia's wine portfolio includes the super-premium Estate range and the lifestyle KC range as well as special release wines like the single vineyard Perdeblokke Sauvignon blanc and a Méthode Cap Classique. Anwilka produces a flagship eponymous red wine and a second label 'little brother' red wine called, Petit Frère. Klein Constantia's icon wine remains, Vin de Constance.

== Cape Muslim heritage ==
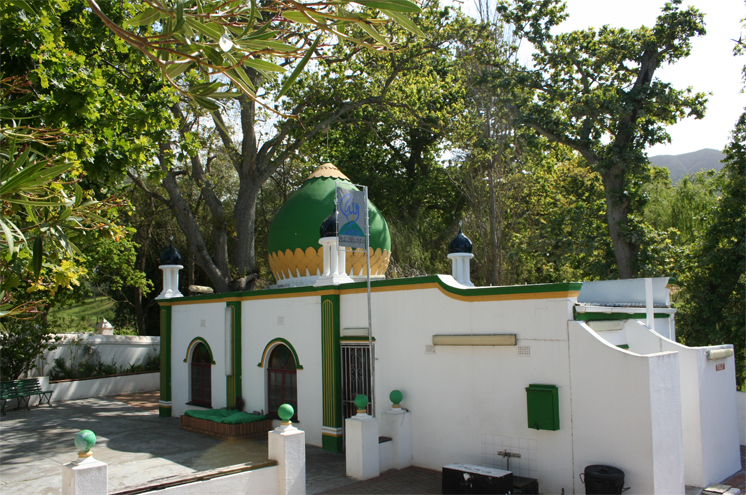
Sheik Abdurachman Matebe Shah's kramat in Klein Constantia.

Klein Constantia is the site of the kramat or grave of a revered Cape Muslim teacher and cleric, Sheik Abdurachman Matebe Shah, who is said to have been one of the three teachers who brought Islam to southern Africa in the seventeenth century.

After being captured during the Dutch conquest of Sumatra, Sheik Abdurachman was banished to the Cape Colony in 1661, only ten years after it was founded. He is thought to have died on the site that the kramat now stands in either 1681 or 1682.
