= David Mayhew (banker) =

British banker

- Born: May 1940 (age 86)
- Education: Eton
- Occupation: Banker
- Known for: Chairman, JP Morgan Cazenove to 2011
- Spouse: Ginny Mayhew
- Children: 3

David Lionel Mayhew CBE (born May 1940) is a British banker, chairman of JP Morgan Cazenove until 2011.

Mayhew has been a longstanding advocate for increased funding and action for dementia research.

== Early life ==
David Lionel Mayhew was born in May 1940. He was educated at Eton.

== Career ==
Mayhew has worked with JP Morgan for more than 50 years. He joined Cazenove in 1969 and became a partner there in 1970. On standing down as chairman of JP Morgan Cazenove in November 2011, the New York Times called him "one of Britain’s most respected bankers". Mayhew subsequently became a vice chairman of global investment banking for JPMorgan Chase. He was appointed CBE in the 2011 Birthday Honours.

== Philanthropy ==
Mayhew has been involved with the UK’s leading dementia research charity, Alzheimer's Research UK, for a number of years and currently holds a senior honorary role as one of the charity’s Vice Presidents. Prior to his role as Vice President, Mayhew was Chair of the Board of Trustees at Alzheimer's Research UK for more than a decade. During his time as Chair, Mayhew oversaw a significant transformation at the charity, overseeing the organisation’s strategy and programmes to help drive progress in dementia research.

== Personal life ==
Mayhew is married to Ginny, a former model, they have three children, and live in Hampshire. He collects art, and is a member of Boodle's and the City of London Club.
