= Groot Constantia =

Colonial manor house in South Africa

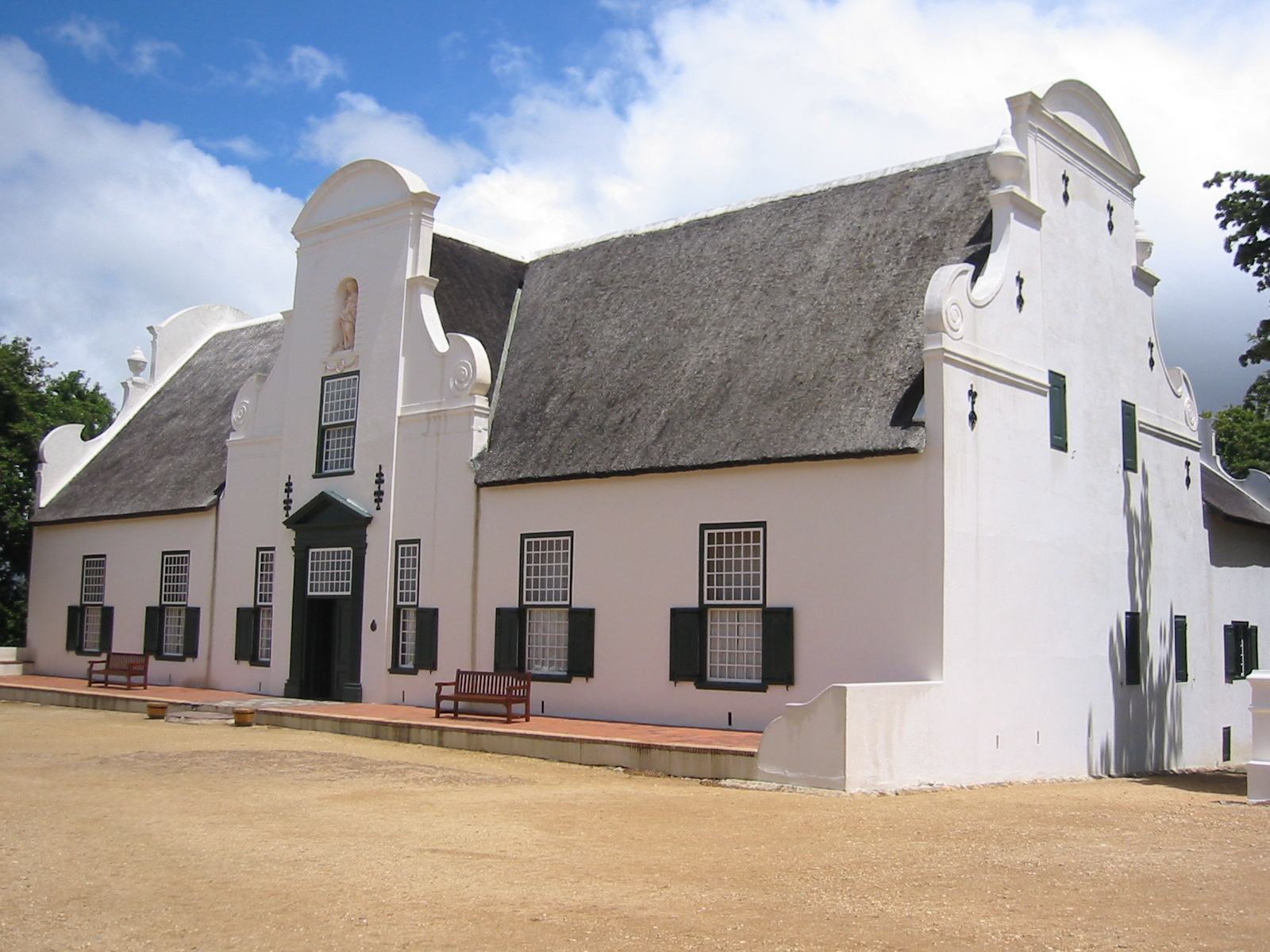
- Groot Constantia manor house, a historic Cape Dutch building

- Location within Cape Town
- 34°1′52″S 18°25′8″E
- Location: Constantia, Cape Town, South Africa.

History
- Built: 17th century

Site notes
- Architectural style: Cape Dutch

Groot Constantia is the oldest wine estate in South Africa and provincial heritage site in the suburb of Constantia in Cape Town, South Africa.

"Groot" in Dutch and Afrikaans translates as "great" (as in large) in English.

== History ==
In 1685, during an annual visit to the Cape, Hendrik Adriaan van Rheede tot Drakenstein granted the grounds of Groot Constantia to Simon van der Stel the VOC Governor of the Cape of Good Hope.

Van der Stel built the house and used the land to produce wine as well as other fruit and vegetables, and for cattle farming. Following Van der Stel's death in 1712 the estate was broken up and sold in three parts: Groot Constantia; Klein Constantia; and Bergvliet.

In 1779 the portion of the estate including Van der Stel's Cape Dutch-style manor house was sold to the Cloete family, who planted extensive vineyards and extended and improved the mansion by commissioning the architect Louis Michel Thibault. The wine cellar was added by Cloete in 1791. The house remained in the possession of the Cloete family until 1885, during which period the estate became famous for its production of Constantia dessert wine.

In 1885 Groot Constantia was purchased by the government of the Cape of Good Hope and was used as an experimental wine and agricultural estate. Following a disastrous fire in 1925 the house was extensively restored.

Jonkershuis, Groot Constantia at the turn of the 20th century.

In the year 1925 the manor house completely burnt down. Funds were raised to reconstruct it to its original Cape Dutch splendour.

In 1969 the manor house became part of the South African Cultural History Museum, and in 1993 the estate passed into the ownership of the Groot Constantia Trust. The exhibition in the house is managed by Iziko South African Museum, and is particularly focused on rural slavery and the life of slaves during the early Cape colonial period.

Today, other estates have joined Groot Constantia to form the scenic Constantia wine route. These estates include Klein Constantia, Buitenverwachting, Constantia Uitsig, Steenberg, Constantia Glen, Eagles Nest and High Constantia.

== Wine production ==
Groot Constantia is noted particularly for its production of high-quality red wines, including Shiraz, Merlot and blended red Gouverneurs Reserve. In 2003 the estate began production of a Constantia dessert wine, called Grand Constance, for the first time since the 1880s.

== The Bell ==
The estate was home to a historic slave bell, cast in 1716, however it was stolen on the 2nd of September, 2024, and has not been recovered or returned since.

== Popular culture ==
- A number of scenes for the 1955 movie Untamed were set at and within Groot Constantia after the protagonist discovers a diamond and returns to Cape Town to live in a stately mansion.

== Gallery ==
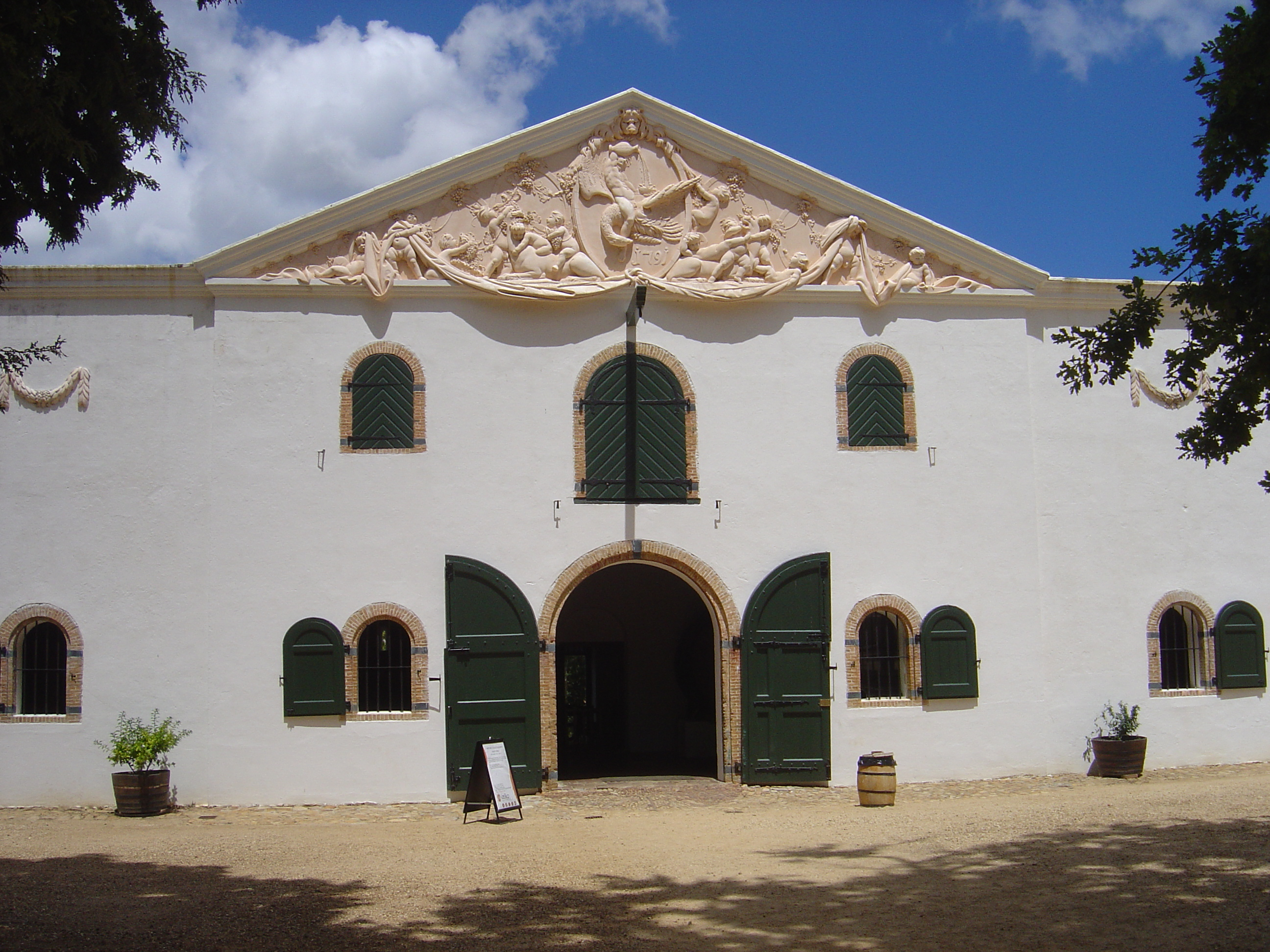
Cloete Cellar building, the original wine cellar at the estate. The pediment gable is by the sculptor Anton Anreith.

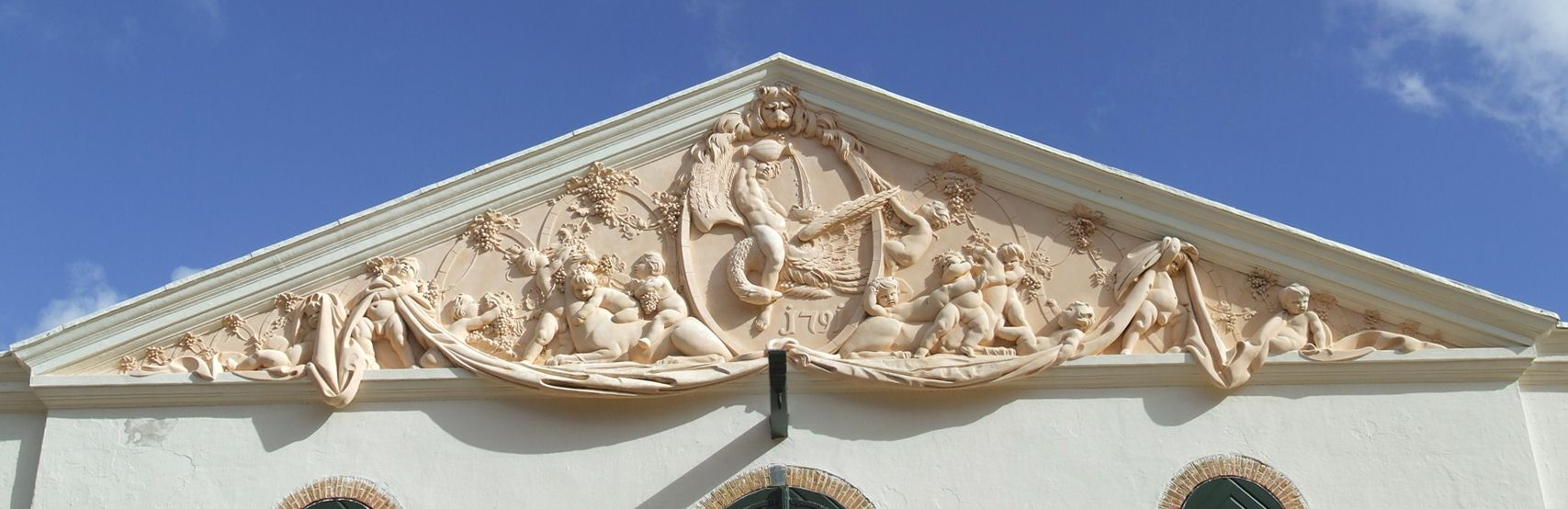
Close up of the pediment gable by sculptor Anton Anreith.

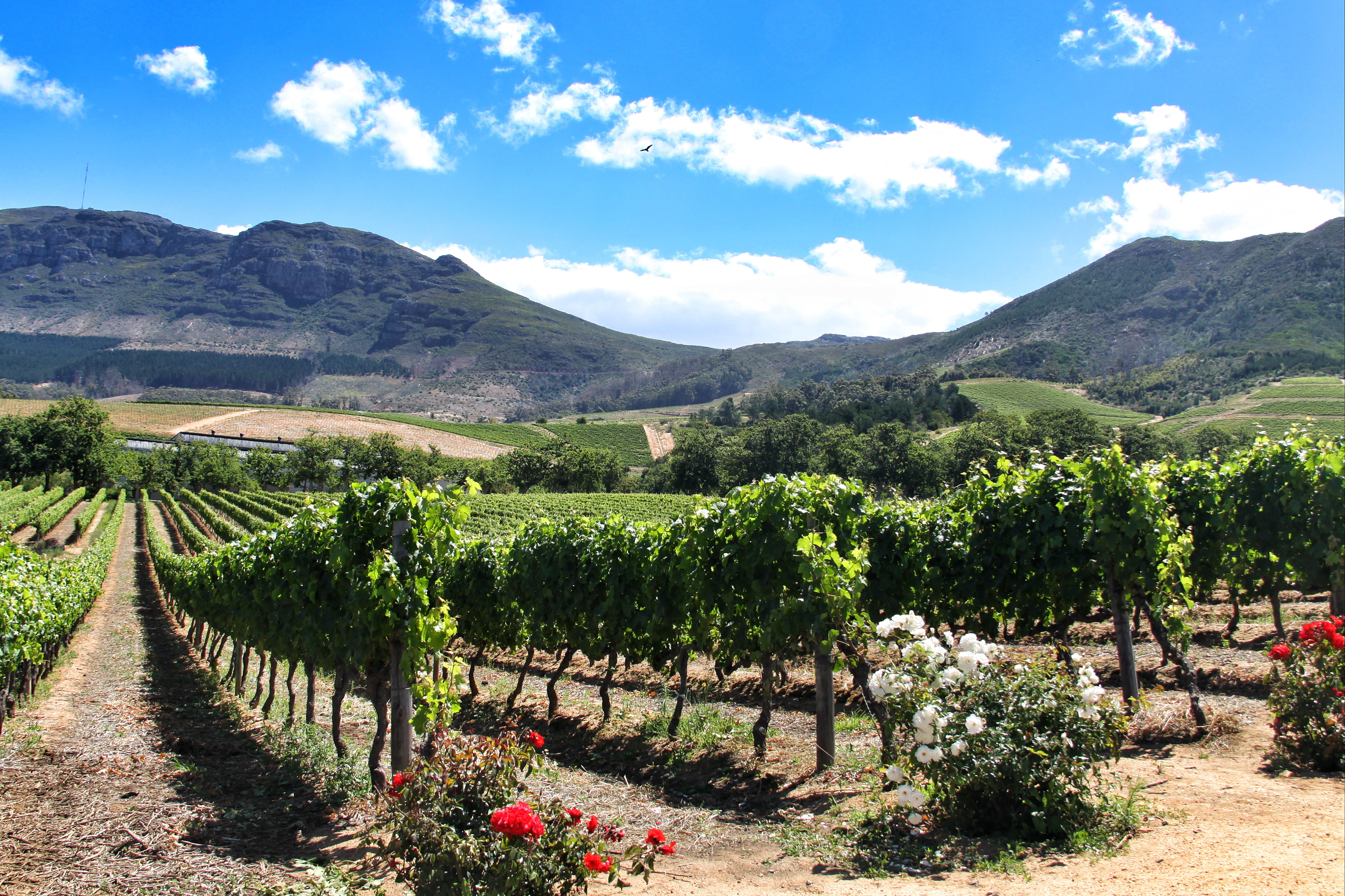
Groot Constantia Estate

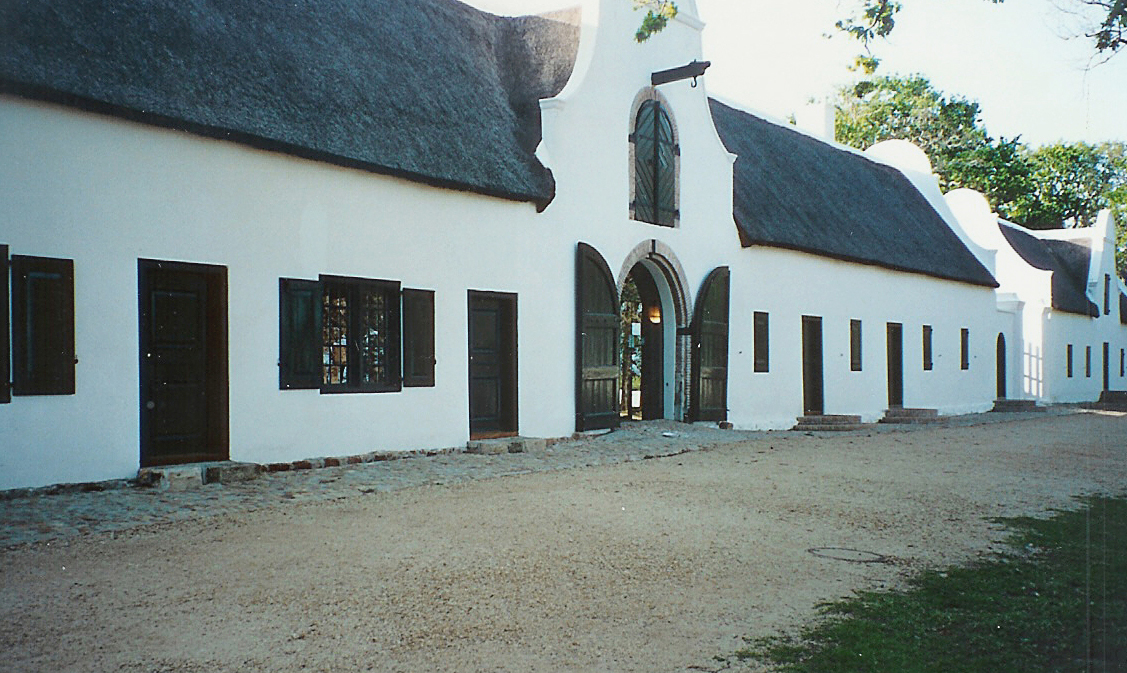
Outbuildings at Groot Constantia, now housing the Jonkershuis Restaurant

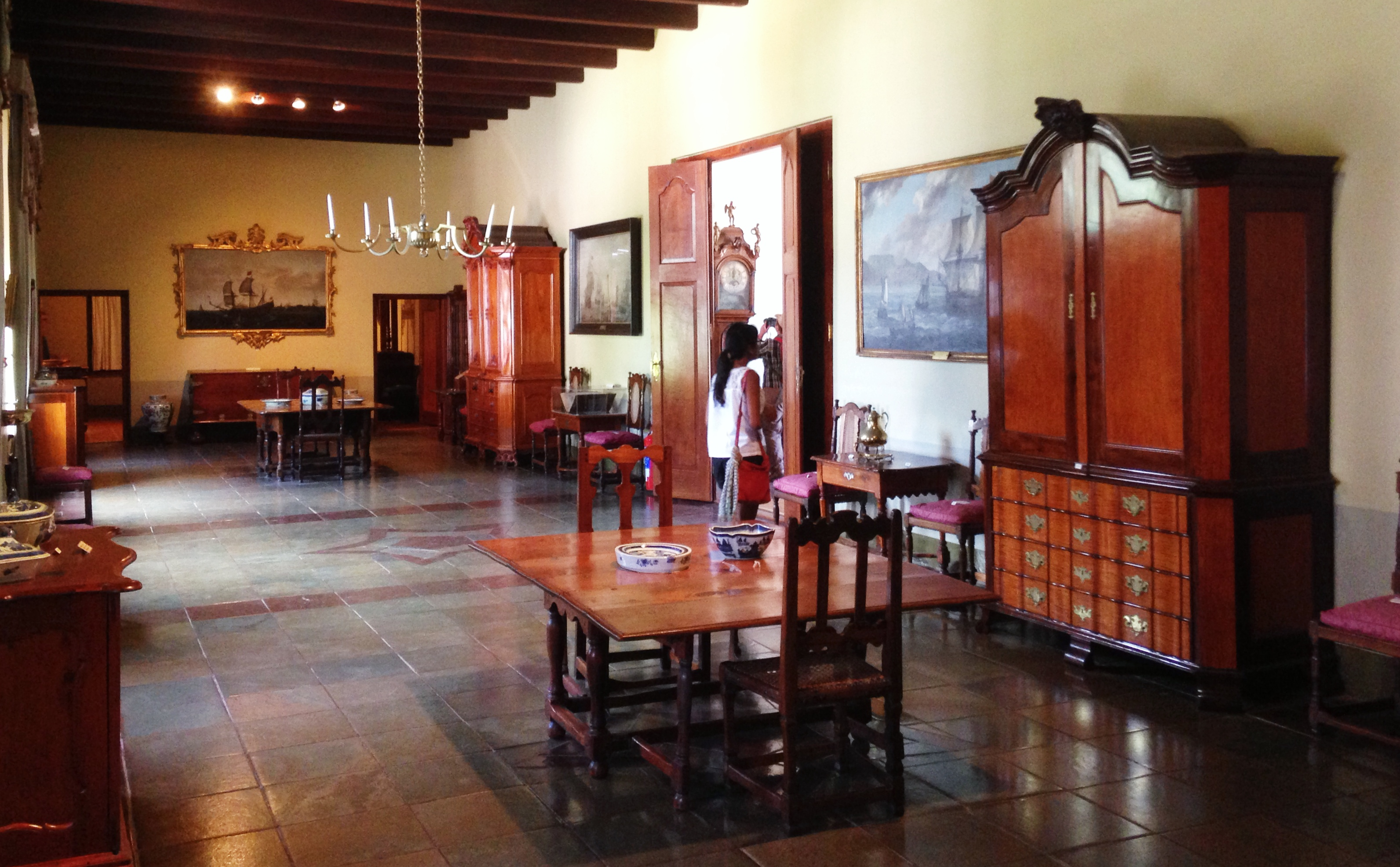
View of the main interior room of Groot Constantia.

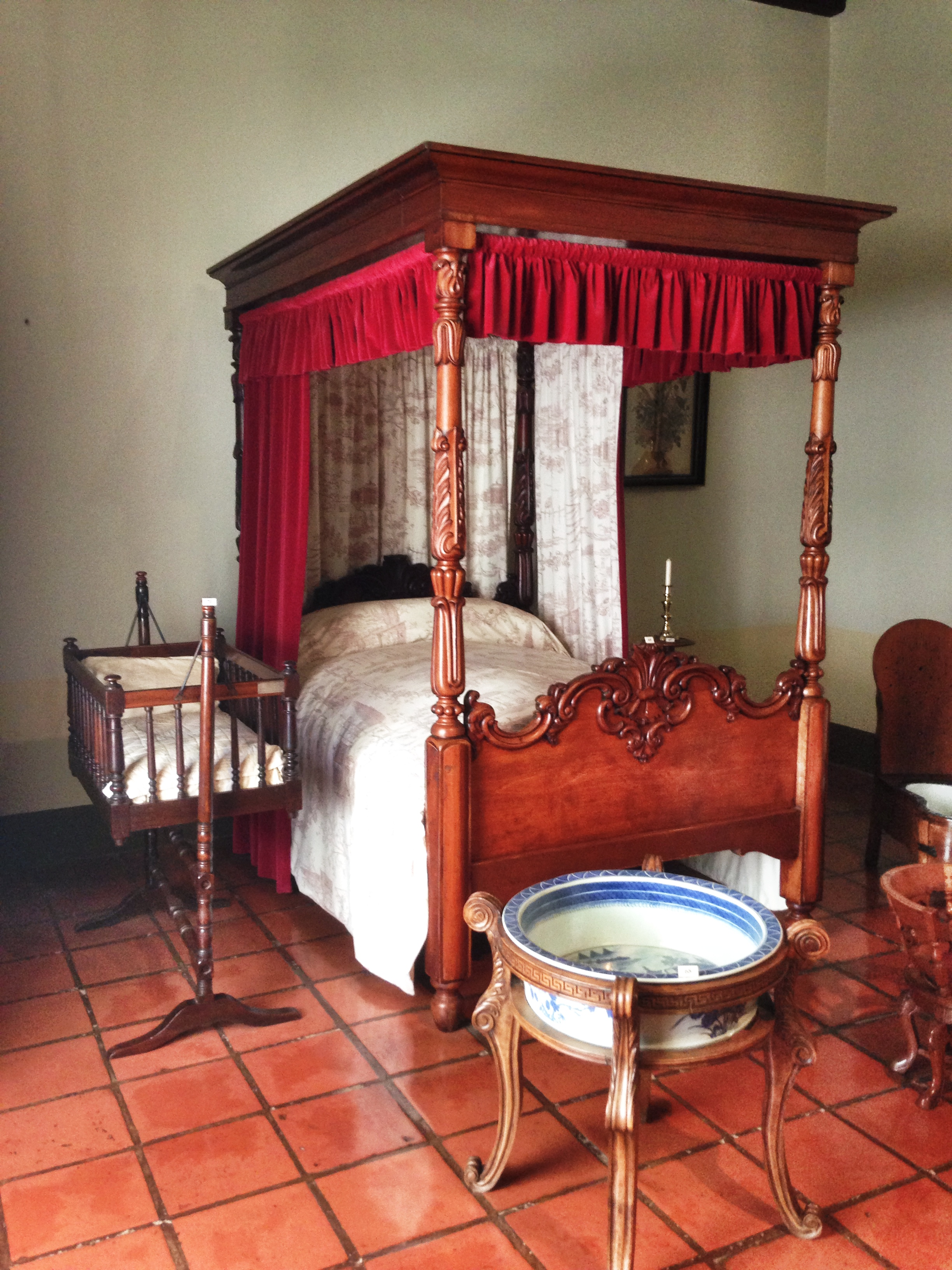
One of the main bedrooms in Groot Constantia restored to how it would have looked in the 1700s.

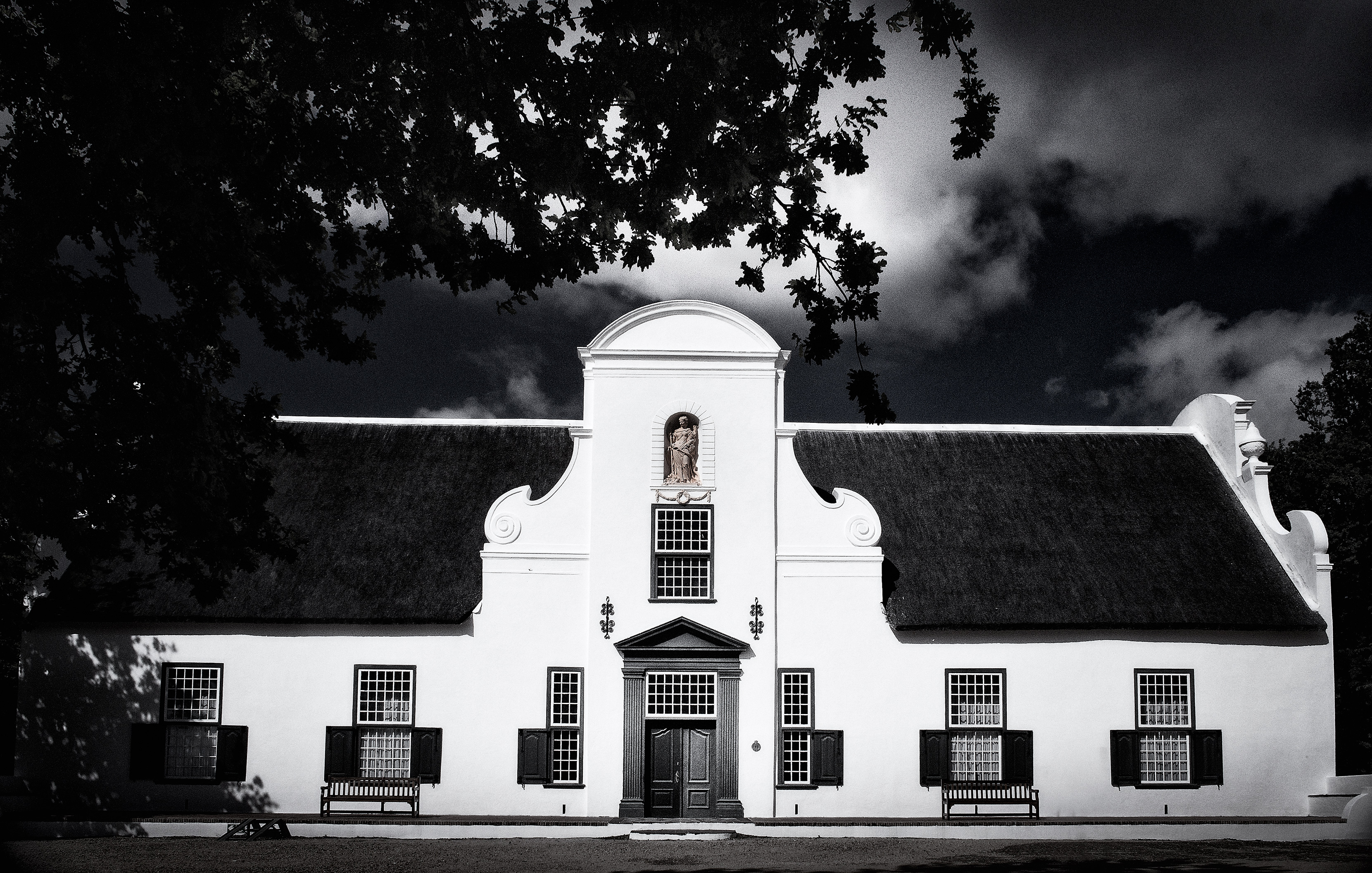
Main house from the front in black and white.

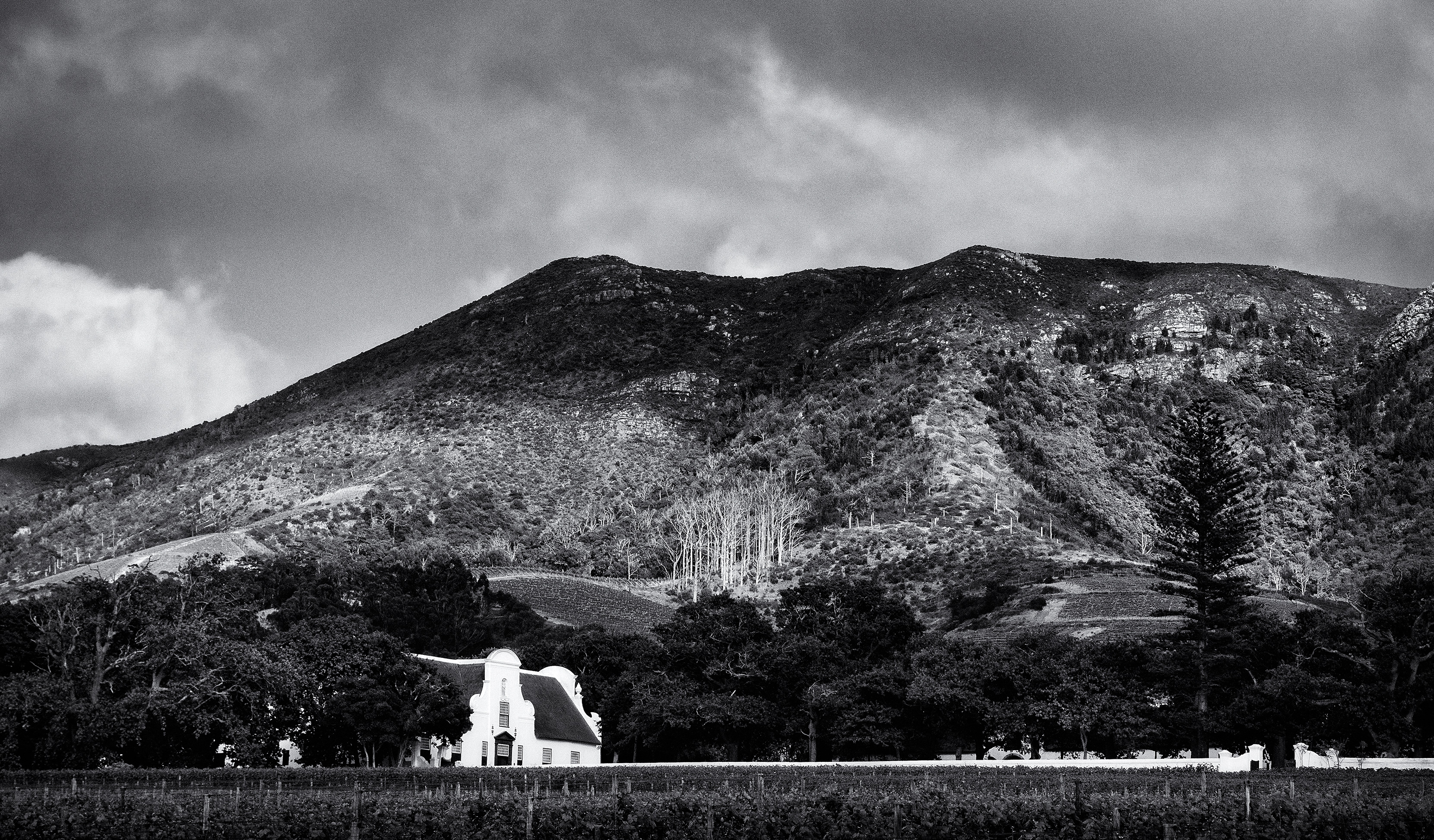
A view of the main house and surrounding hills in black and white.

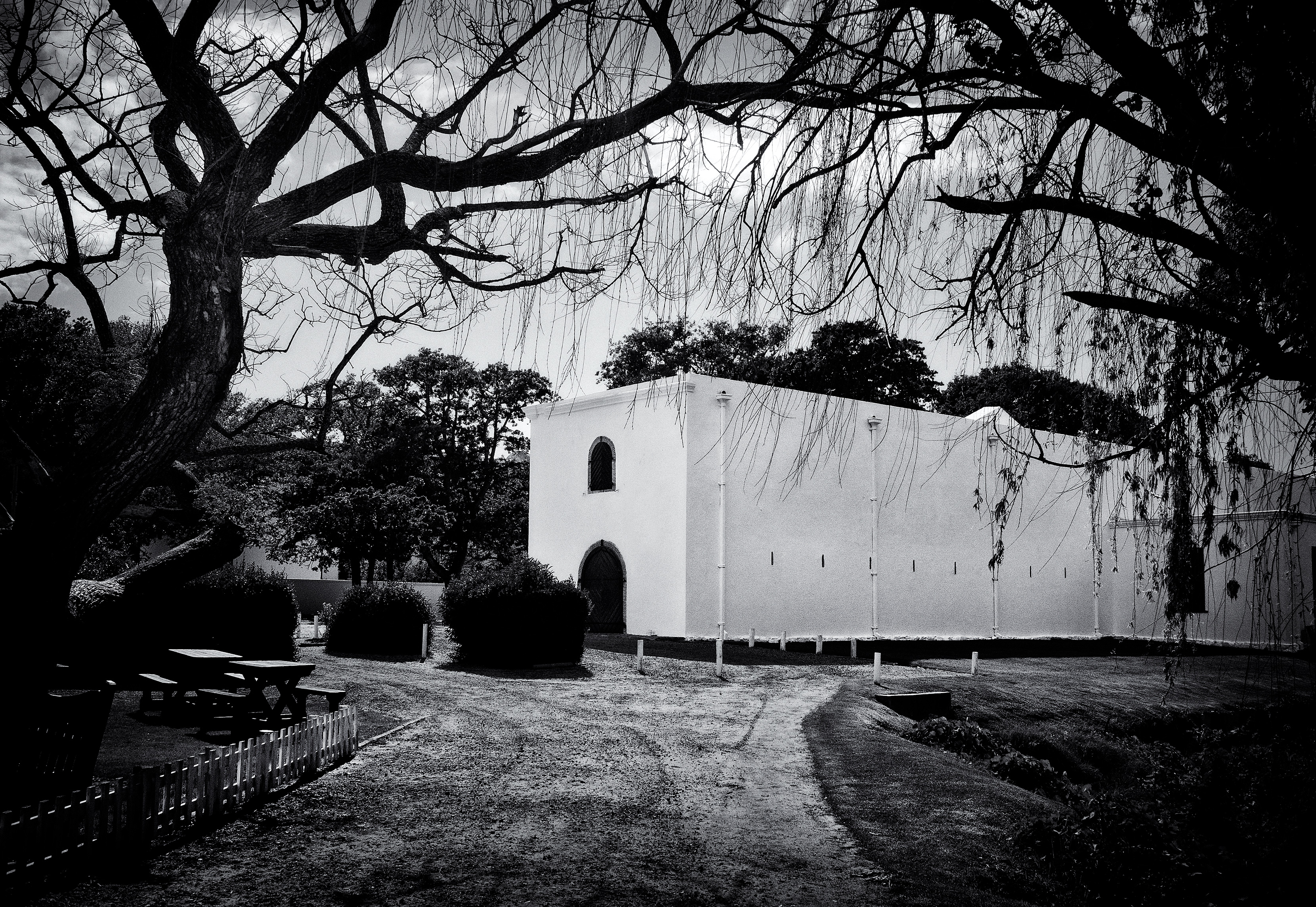
The Wine Cellar building at Groot Constantia in black and white.

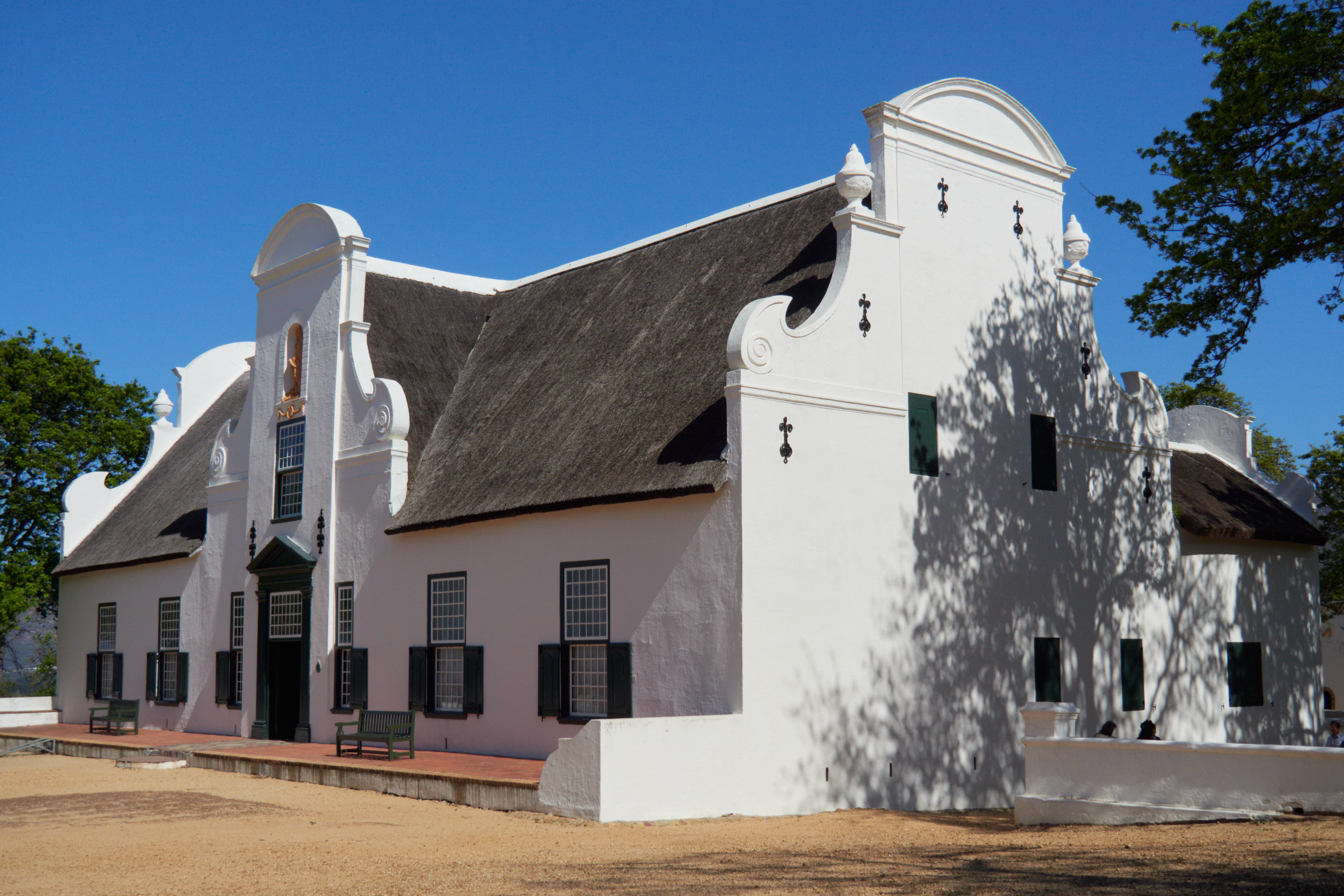

== See also ==
- List of Castles and Fortifications in South Africa
