= Cazenove (stock broker) =

British stockbroker and investment bank

- Company type: Private Limited Company
- Industry: Finance, banking
- Founded: 1823
- Founder: Philip Cazenove
- Defunct: 2009
- Headquarters: London, United Kingdom
- Key people: David Mayhew (Chairman)
- Services: Stockbroker and investment bank

Cazenove was a British stockbroker and investment bank, founded in 1823 by Philip Cazenove. It was one of the UK's last independent investment banks and one of the last to remain a private partnership. The investment banking business entered into a joint venture with JPMorgan Chase in 2004, and the fund management business Cazenove Capital Management spun off in 2005. In 2009, JPMorgan Chase acquired the remainder of the investment banking business. Cazenove Capital Management was acquired by Schroders in 2013.

The Partnership was well known for its "blue-blooded" reputation and its complete aversion to publicity. It was one of the most successful brokers and corporate advisers in London, being described by the Financial Times as "dominant" and as having an "aura".

== History ==
=== Early history and growth ===
The company has its roots in the early Huguenot financiers who left France for Geneva in 1685 after the revocation of the Edict of Nantes, which established Catholicism as the state religion of France. Among those were members of the Cazenove family, who later left Geneva for the UK seeking wealth and freedom in the City of London.

In 1819 Philip Cazenove first joined the business of his brother-in-law John Francis Menet (John Menet had married Philip Cazenove's sister Louisa in 1805). Cazenove and Menet become partners, and in 1823 the firm of Cazenove started. After Menet died, Cazenove entered into a partnership with Joseph Laurence and Charles Pearce.

In 1854 Cazenove branched out on his own, and later he formed a new partnership with his son and nephew.

The company played a major part as advisor in most of Margaret Thatcher's UK Government's privatisation issues in the 1980s.

=== Change of corporate structure ===
In 2000, Cazenove & Co announced its intention to dissolve the partnership, incorporate, and then float on the London Stock Exchange. At this stage the firm had 80 partners, with unlimited liability, and 1170 employees. The company duly incorporated and raised funds from institutional investors, However the company's ambition to list publicly was hampered by poor market conditions in the UK in 2001 and 2002.

=== Merger with JPMorgan Chase ===
In November 2004, Cazenove and JPMorgan Chase announced an agreement that JPMorgan would buy a 50% stake in Cazenove and merge their UK investment banking operations, with an option to buy the remaining 50% stake within five years.

In 2009, JPMorgan completed the purchase for £1 billion; the combined business continued to be called J.P. Morgan Cazenove. JP Morgan Cazenove completed the sale of its Asian business, Cazenove Asia, to a subsidiary of Standard Chartered, Standard Chartered Bank in Hong Kong that year.

== Businesses ==
In 2003/04 Cazenove had a turnover of £251.4m ($452m) and was composed of:

- JPMorgan Cazenove: a joint venture, established in 2004, that combined Cazenove's investment banking operations with JPMorgan's UK investment banking business. This business was fully acquired by JPMorgan in 2009.
- Cazenove Capital Management: £7.6bn in assets under management. This business continued independently, and was acquired by Schroders in July 2013.
- Cazenove Private Equity: was spun out as a private equity firm.
- Cazenove Asia Limited was the regional office of Cazenove in the Asia-Pacific region, with offices in Hong Kong, Shanghai, Beijing and Singapore. This business was acquired by Standard Chartered PLC in February 2009.

== Other ==
The last Cazenove to work for the company was Bernard Cazenove, formerly head of the fund management business. He retired in December 2004, just before the JPMorgan merger.

Although the firm refused to comment on its relations to the Royal Family, it was widely assumed that it was the appointed stockbroker to Queen Elizabeth II.
