= Back (surname) =

Back is a surname, and may refer to:

- Adam Back (born 1970), British cryptographer
- Akira Back (born 1974), Korean-American chef and restaurateur
- Back Da-yeon (born 2002), Korean tennis player
- Back Hye-ryun (born 1967), South Korean prosecutor and parliamentarian
- Back Sang-suh (born 1960), South Korean handball player
- Back Young-chul (born 1978), South Korean former footballer
- Charles Back, South African winemaker
- Chris Back (born 1950), Australian politician
- Doug Back (born 1954), Canadian media artist
- Ernst Emil Alexander Back (1881–1959), German physicist
- Fin Back (born 2002), English footballer
- Frédéric Back (1924–2013), Canadian animator
- George Back (1796–1878), British naval officer and explorer
- Gordon Back (born c.1950), Welsh pianist
- Gusty Back (1927–2010), Luxembourgish footballer
- Guy Back (born 1959), Luxembourgish footballer
- Hans-Ulrich Back (1896–1976), German general
- Hugh Back (1863–1928), Archdeacon of Warwick
- Jean Back (born 1953), Luxembourgish writer, photographer and civil servant
- Lennart Back (1933–2022), Swedish race walker
- Les Back (born 1962), English sociology professor and author
- Matt Back (born 1970), Welsh rugby union international
- Natasja Crone Back (born 1971), Danish journalist
- Neil Back (born 1969), English rugby player
- Oskar Back (1879–1963), Austrian-Dutch violinist
- Pär-Erik Back (1920–1988), Swedish social scientist
- Rachel Tzvia Back, American-Israeli poet, translator and academic
- Ralph-Johan Back, Finnish computer scientist
- Robert Back (1922–2004), British marine artist
- Rolf Back (1928–2009), Finnish sprinter
- Rico Back (born 1954), German businessman
- William Back (cricketer) (1856–1911), Australian cricketer
- William Back (geologist) (1925-2008), American geologist

== See also ==
- Backe (surname)
- Bäck
