= Wine humour =

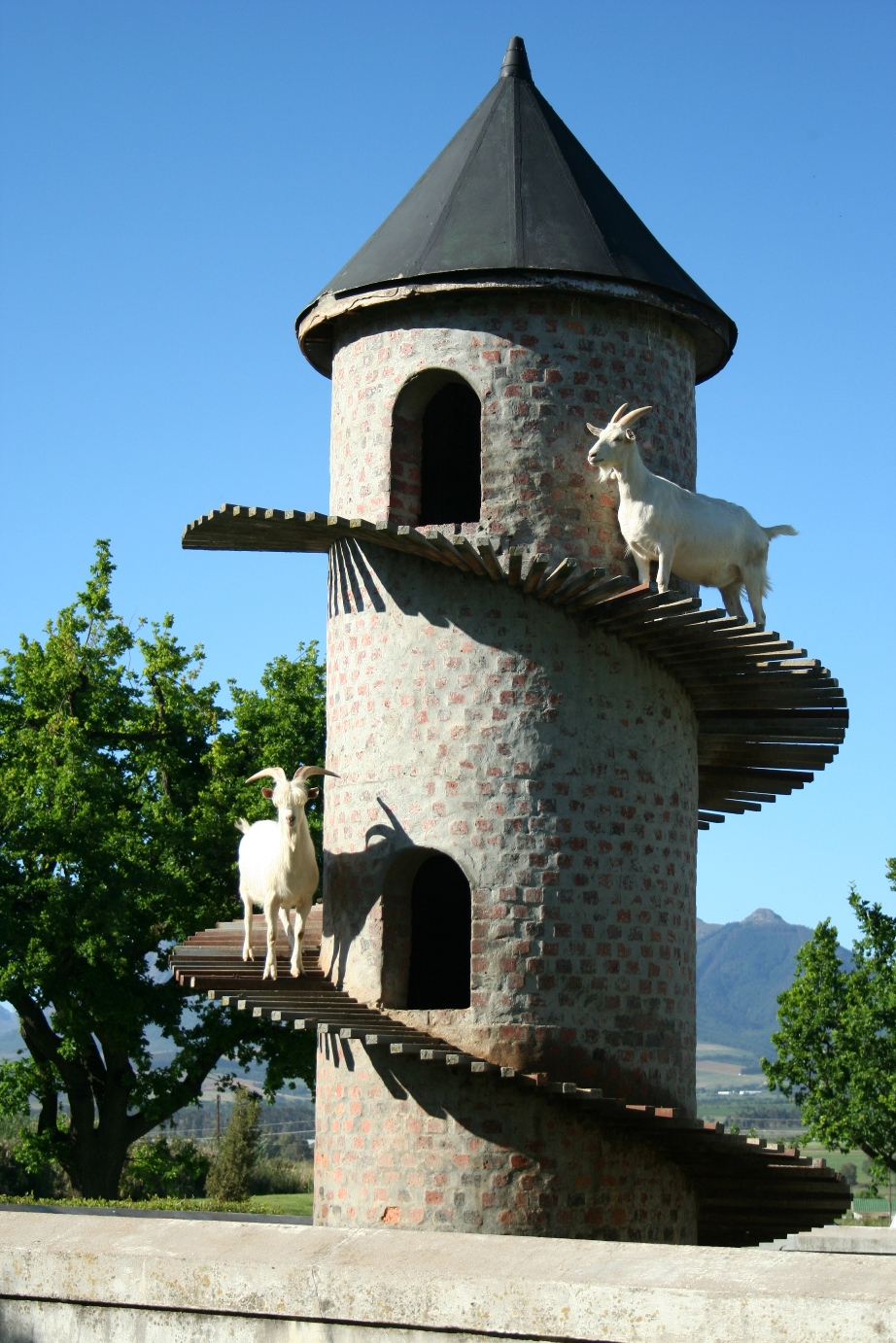
- Fairview's goats do roam
- Language: English

Wine humour is humour associated with wine. As well as ordinary anecdotes, cartoons and jokes, the whimsical labels and names given to wine are a particular source of amusement. Humour is usually rare in the world of wine, and wine jokes may only be amusing to wine obsessives.

== Label humour ==
Numerous wines have been given names which are deliberately amusing. These form categories:

=== Puns ===
The South African Goats do Roam Wine Company, owned by Charles Back, produces labels with names such as Goats do Roam, Bored Doe and Goat-Roti. The Institut National des Appellations d'Origine (INAO) has protested at the similarity of these names to the French appellation Côtes du Rhône but owner Charles Back's defence is that the names are based upon the goats which roam about his Fairview winery and has made counter-protests with a herd of goats outside the French embassy.

=== Self-deprecation ===
The New Zealand producer Cooper's Creek produces a Sauvignon blanc called Cat's Pee on a Gooseberry Bush which has sold well throughout the world. This phrase to describe the distinctive taste of the New Zealand wines made from this grape variety was first coined by wine critic, Oz Clarke. The Bureau of Alcohol, Tobacco, Firearms and Explosives, which controls the import of alcoholic drinks into the US, insisted that the name should be changed to Cat's Phee on a Gooseberry Bush.

=== Sexual innuendo ===
Wolf Blass created a sparkling Australian red wine called René Pogel. When people inquired who this person was, Blass advised them to read the name backwards (leg opener). This innuendo caused offence and so the wine was withdrawn from sale.

=== Fantasy names ===
The Bonny Doon vineyard in California is famous for its amusing labels which include Le Cigare Volant. This recalls the resolution passed by the village council of Châteauneuf-du-Pape in 1954, forbidding the landing of flying saucers in the region's vineyards.

=== Critters ===
Critter brands feature animals on their labels - a style which started with the Yellow Tail brand in 2004. These have a light-hearted, whimsical style which appeals to consumers who might be repelled by a more traditional style, which might seem too intimidating, pretentious or stuffy. Sales figures in 2006 indicated that about 18% of new wine brands were styled in this way and that annual sales in the USA were about $600 million. The d'Arenberg company in Australia is famous for the amusing names of its wines and one such is called The Hermit Crab.

== Anecdotes and jokes ==
Anecdotes and jokes may be told about wine. An old chestnut which has appeared in many contexts concerns a vineyard which sent its wine to a lab for analysis. The report which was returned warned that "Your horse has diabetes!". The artist and wine enthusiast Ronald Searle has produced a book of cartoons and humour about wine called Something in the cellar. He also produced a collection of cartoons which satirised the art of wine-tasting — The Illustrated Winespeak.
