= Bäck =

Bäck is a surname of Swedish descent, meaning "brook", "stream" (related to Old Norse bekkr).

== Notable people ==
Notable people with this surname include:

- Abraham Bäck (1713–1795), Swedish physician
- Airi Bäck (born 1993), Finnish badminton playe
- Axel Bäck (1987), alpine skier from Sweden
- Elmer Bäck (1981), Finnish actor
- Immanuel Bäck (1876–1939), Finnish Lutheran clergyman and politician
- Johannes Bäck (1872–1952), Finnish Lutheran clergyman and politician
- Oskar Bäck (2000), Swedish professional ice hockey forward
- Sven-Erik Bäck (1919–1994), Swedish composer of classical music
