= Spice Route Paarl =

Tourist destination in Paarl, South Africa

Coordinates: 33.7635°S 18.9192°E

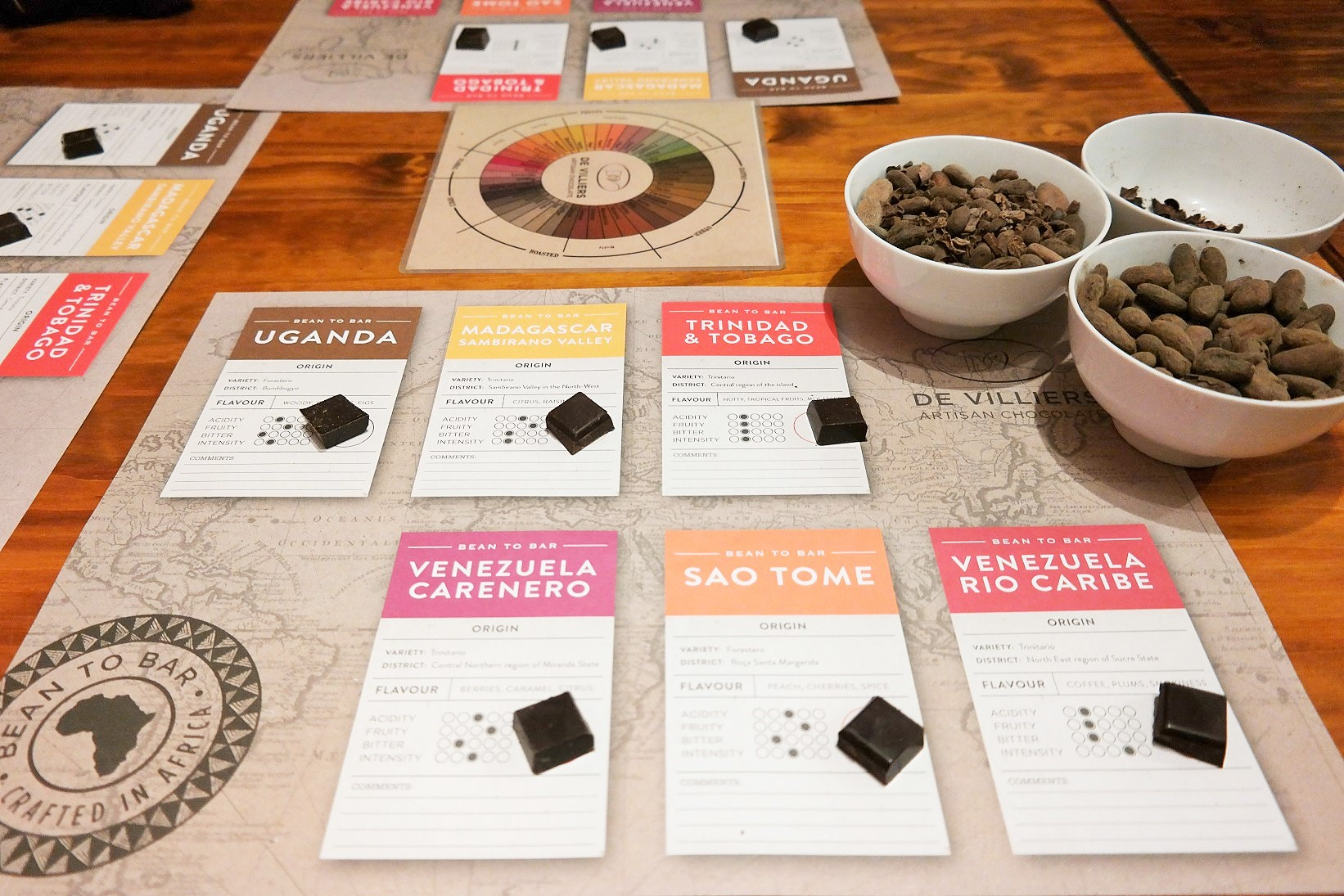
Chocolate tasting at the Spice Route in Paarl

The Spice Route Paarl is a tourist destination located in the city of Paarl, South Africa. The farm is open 7 days a week but each vendor adheres to their own operating hours. The name Spice Route dates back to the historical mariners who used to trade Eastern spices to Europe along the "Spice Route" for spice trade in the 15th century. The Estate gives visitors the opportunity to explore local foods, beverages and goods, that are produced in a traditional manner supporting the local community while spreading the taste and spirit of South Africa out to the world. Its cellar production and wine tasting is conducted of red and white wines from the local Malmesbury and Darling wine yards, which received national and international attention.

== History ==
Charles Back, the owner of the estate as well as of Fairview, initiated his project Spice Route in 1997. His vision was "to offer local and international tourists a selection of hand-picked artisanal producers who put as much thought, skill and passion into their products as Spice Route wine maker, Charl du Plessis, puts into his wines".

== Location and tourism ==
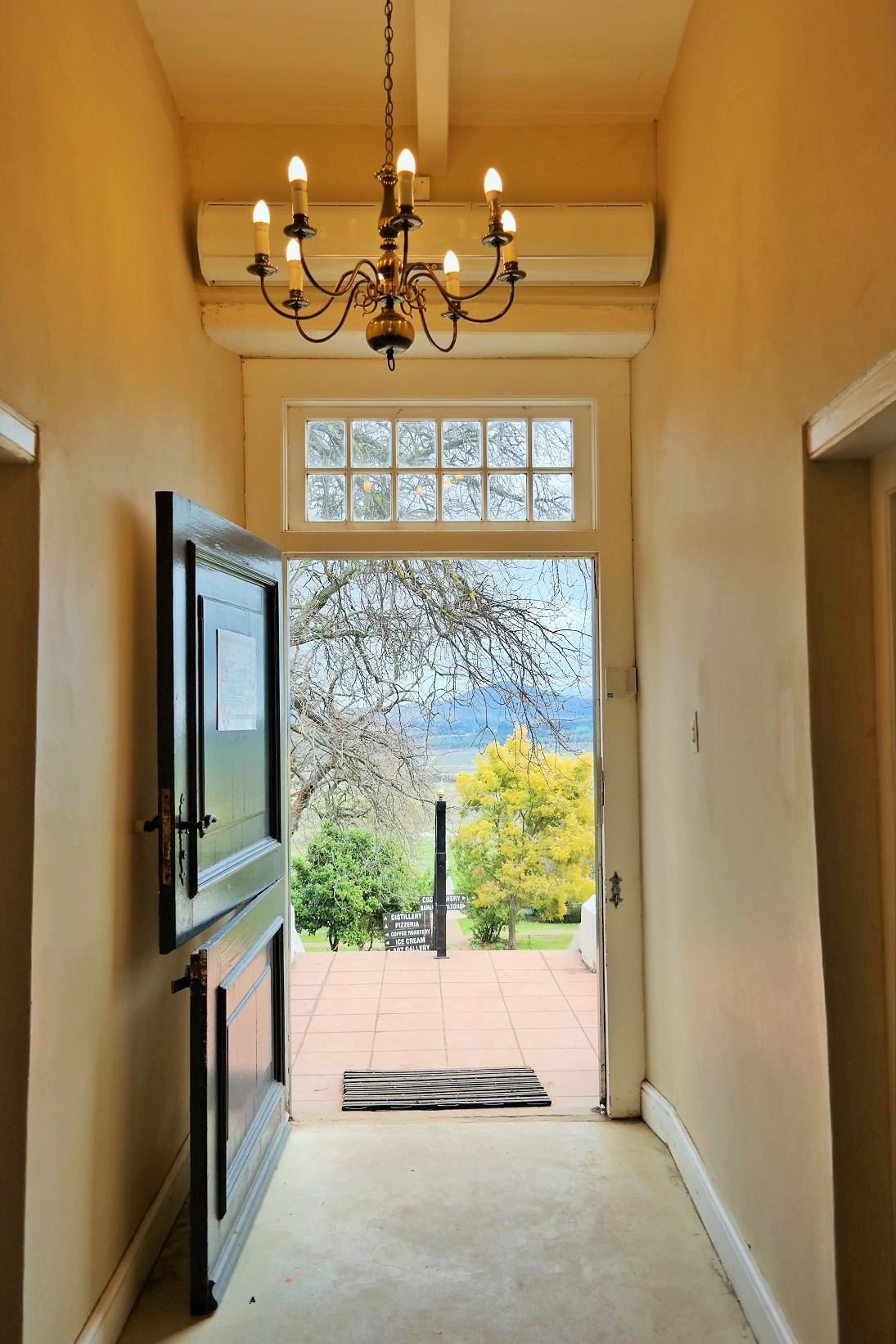
Paarl's surrounding is shaped by a mountain range and numerous vineyards of the Cape Winelands.

The Spice Route is located at the Seidelberg Wine Estate. It is a 40 minutes drive from Cape Town and 800 meters away from Fairview Wine and Cheese Estate.

Distances

- Cape Town: 58 km
- Stellenbosch: 25 km
- Worcester: 61 km

== Components of the Spice Route ==
Visitors can go on a journey on that traditional route, which takes them to the following 11 destinations to explore the culture, art and taste of South Africa:

1. Wine Tasting
2. Cape Brewing Co.
3. DV Artisan Chocolate
4. Barley & Biltong
5. Ristorante Pasta Pasta
6. Wilderer Distillery
7. The Trading company
8. The Barn Artist`s
9. Red Hot Glass
10. DV Cottage Café
11. La Grapperia Pizza & Bistro
12. Sirenia Diamonds

== See also ==
- Route 62
- Route 44
- Wine tasting
- Enotourism
- South African wine
