= Findlay, Illinois =

Findlay
- Village
- Location of Findlay in Shelby County, Illinois.
- Coordinates: 39°31′22″N 88°45′05″W
- Country: United States
- State: Illinois
- County: Shelby

Area
  - Total: 0.92 sq mi (2.39 km^{2})
  - Land: 0.92 sq mi (2.39 km^{2})
  - Water: 0 sq mi (0.00 km^{2})
- Elevation: 682 ft (208 m)

Population (2020)
  - Total: 664
  - Density: 718.9/sq mi (277.58/km^{2})
- Time zone: UTC-6 (CST)
  - Summer (DST): UTC-5 (CDT)
- ZIP code: 62534
- Area code: 217
- FIPS code: 17-26116
- GNIS ID: 2398878

Findlay is a village in Shelby County, Illinois, United States. The population was 664 at the 2020 census.

== Geography ==
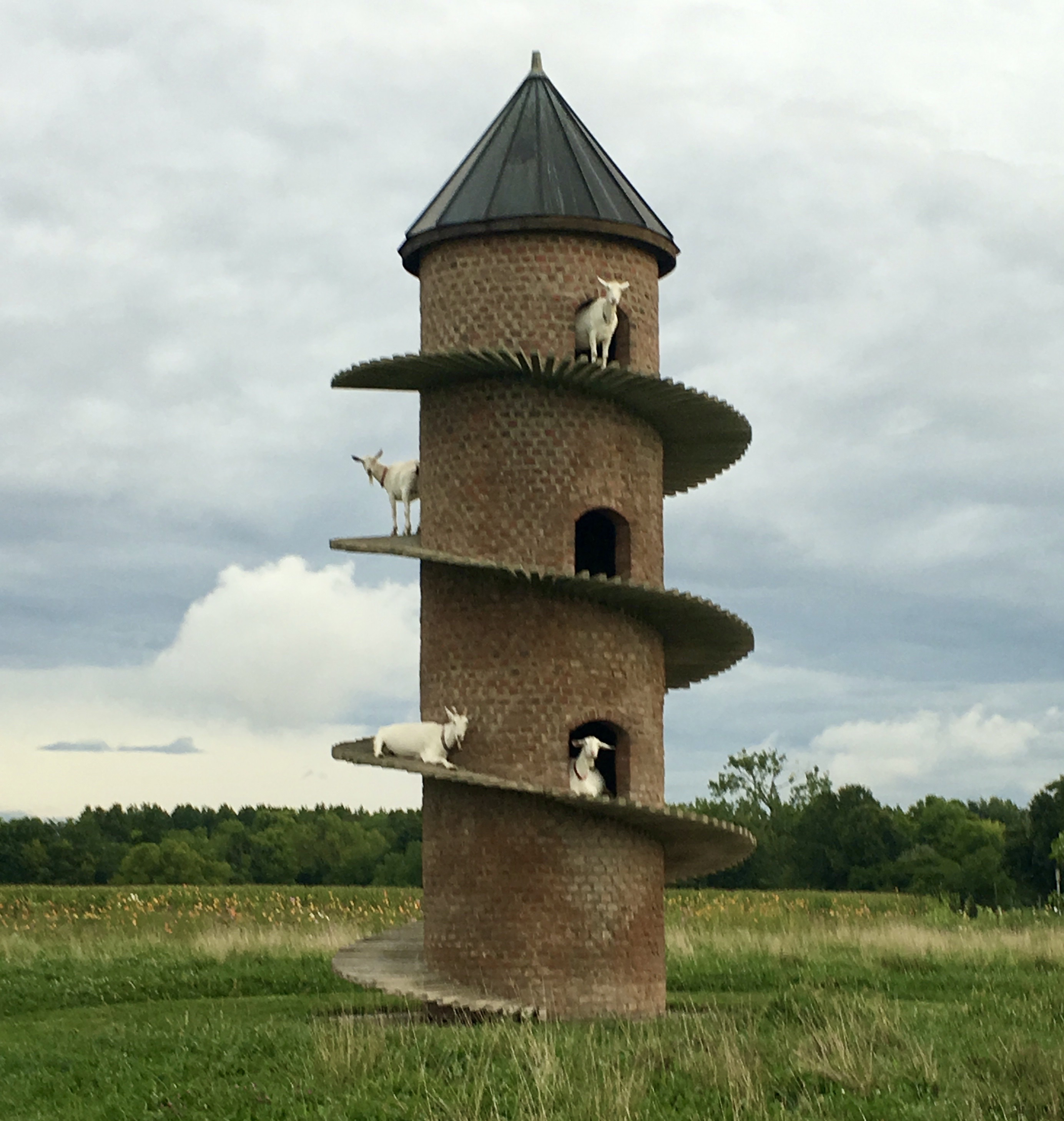
Goat tower in Findlay

According to the 2010 census, Findlay has a total area of 0.92 square miles (2.38 km^{2}), all land.

=== State parks ===
Two state parks, Eagle Creek State Park and Wolf Creek State Park, are located near Findlay. Both parks are at Lake Shelbyville — Findlay calls itself "The Heart of Lake Shelbyville" in tourist advertising.

== Demographics ==
Historical population
Census	Pop.	Note	%±
1900	479		—
1910	827		72.7%
1920	882		6.7%
1930	682		−22.7%
1940	688		0.9%
1950	680		−1.2%
1960	759		11.6%
1970	809		6.6%
1980	868		7.3%
1990	787		−9.3%
2000	723		−8.1%
2010	683		−5.5%
2020	664		−2.8%
U.S. Decennial Census

As of the census of 2000, there were 723 people, 311 households, and 208 families residing in the village. The population density was 786.7 inhabitants per square mile (303.7/km^{2}). There were 339 housing units at an average density of 368.8 per square mile (142.4/km^{2}). The racial makeup of the village was 98.48% White, 0.83% African American, 0.28% Native American, 0.28% Asian, and 0.14% from two or more races. Hispanic or Latino of any race were 0.83% of the population.

There were 311 households, out of which 26.0% had children under the age of 18 living with them, 54.3% were married couples living together, 9.3% had a female householder with no husband present, and 32.8% were non-families. 30.2% of all households were made up of individuals, and 15.8% had someone living alone who was 65 years of age or older. The average household size was 2.32 and the average family size was 2.87.

In the village, the population was spread out, with 24.2% under the age of 18, 8.4% from 18 to 24, 27.4% from 25 to 44, 23.2% from 45 to 64, and 16.7% who were 65 years of age or older. The median age was 39 years. For every 100 females, there were 89.8 males. For every 100 females age 18 and over, there were 84.5 males.

The median income for a household in the village was $30,962, and the median income for a family was $39,375. Males had a median income of $37,500 versus $21,438 for females. The per capita income for the village was $15,990. About 8.8% of families and 12.6% of the population were below the poverty line, including 19.0% of those under age 18 and 10.9% of those age 65 or over.

== Education ==
Findlay is a part of the Okaw Valley Community Unit School District 302. Okaw Valley is a K-12 district that was created in 2001 when the schools of Bethany and Findlay consolidated their individual school districts. The elementary and high school are located in Bethany while the middle school is located in Findlay. Okaw Valley's school sports teams have the nickname "Timberwolves" and compete in the “Lincoln Prairie Conference.”
