= Paarl =

City in Western Cape, South Africa

- City
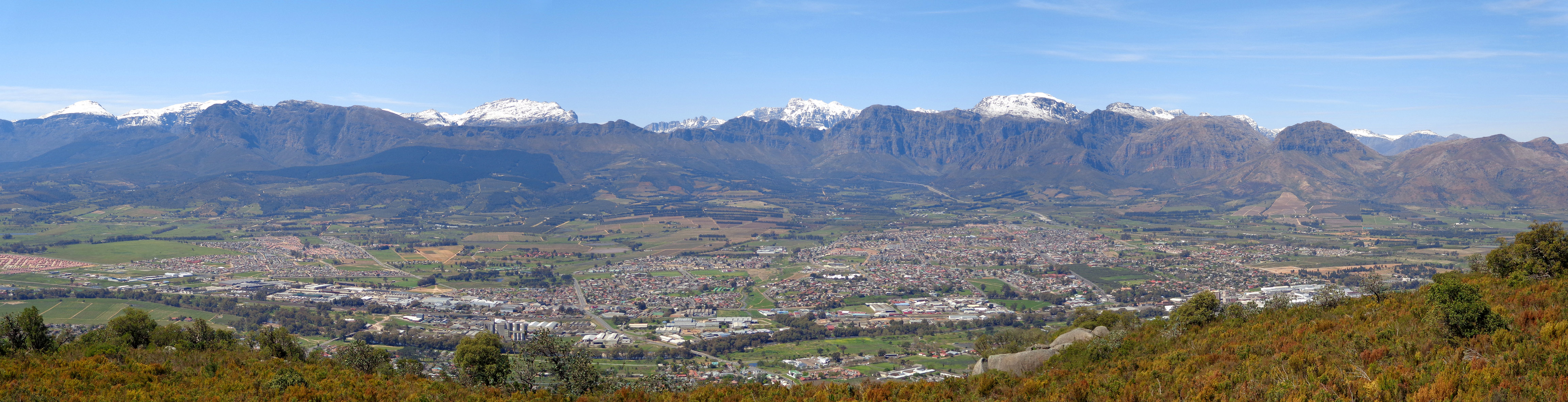
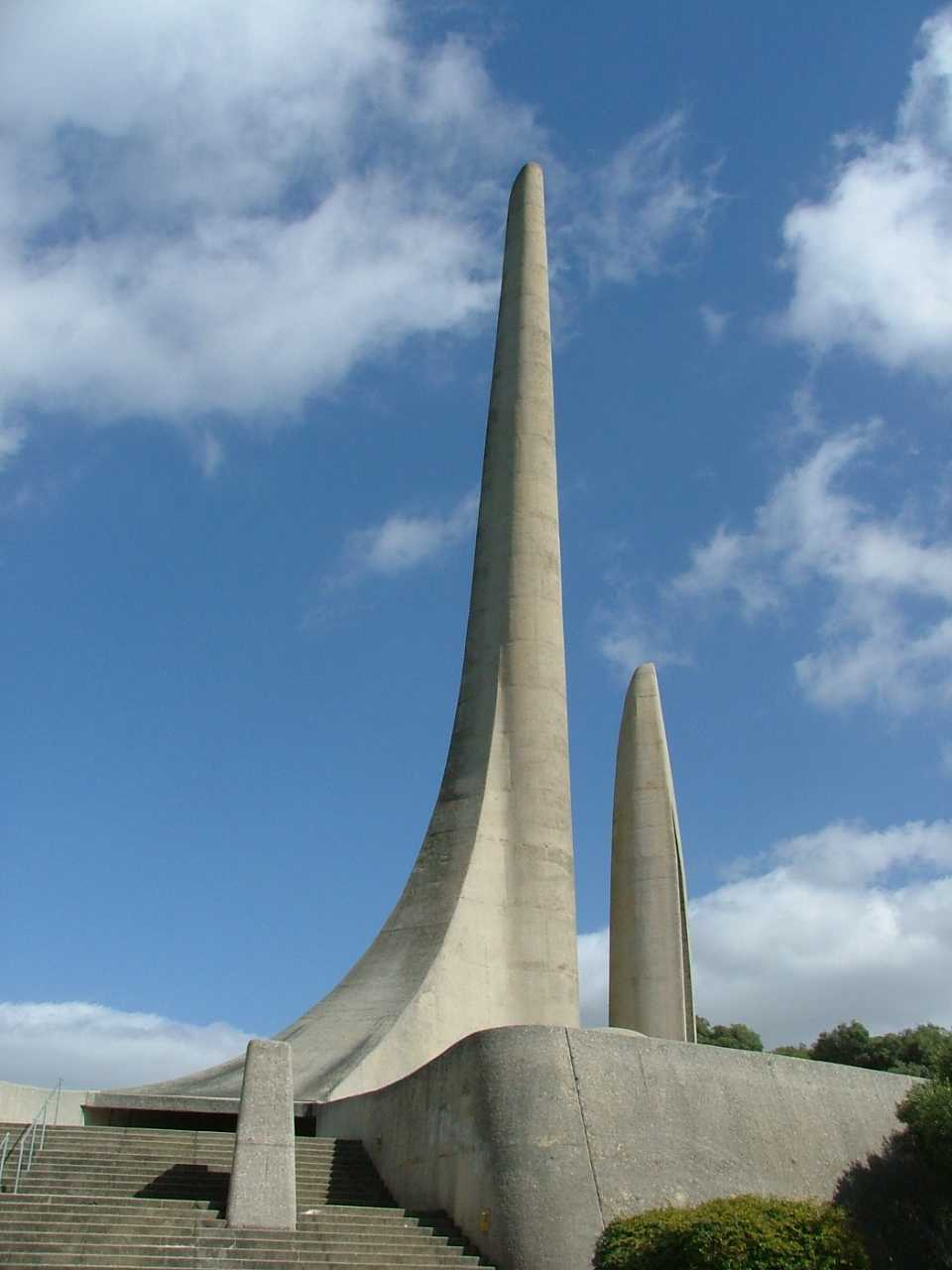
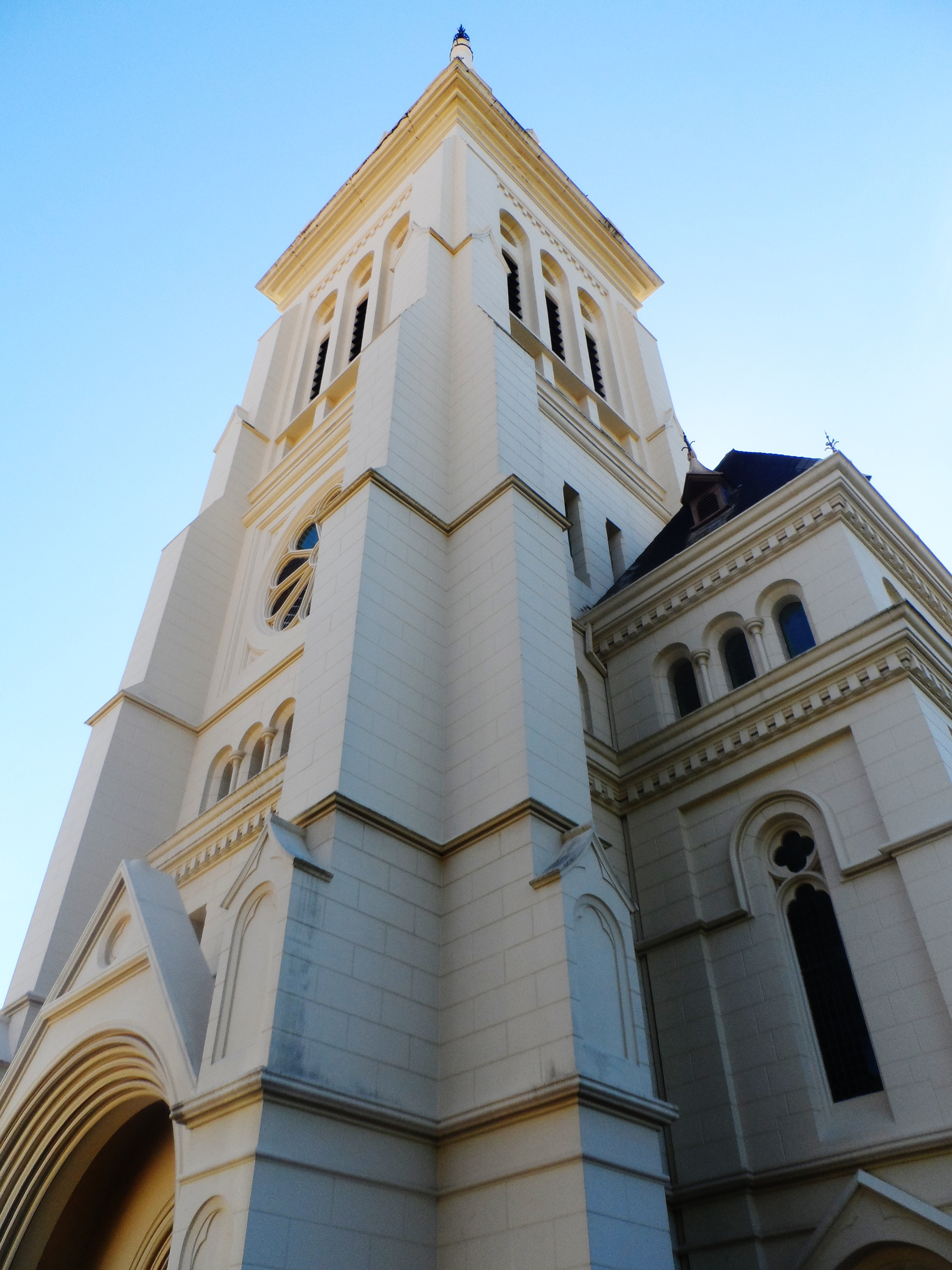
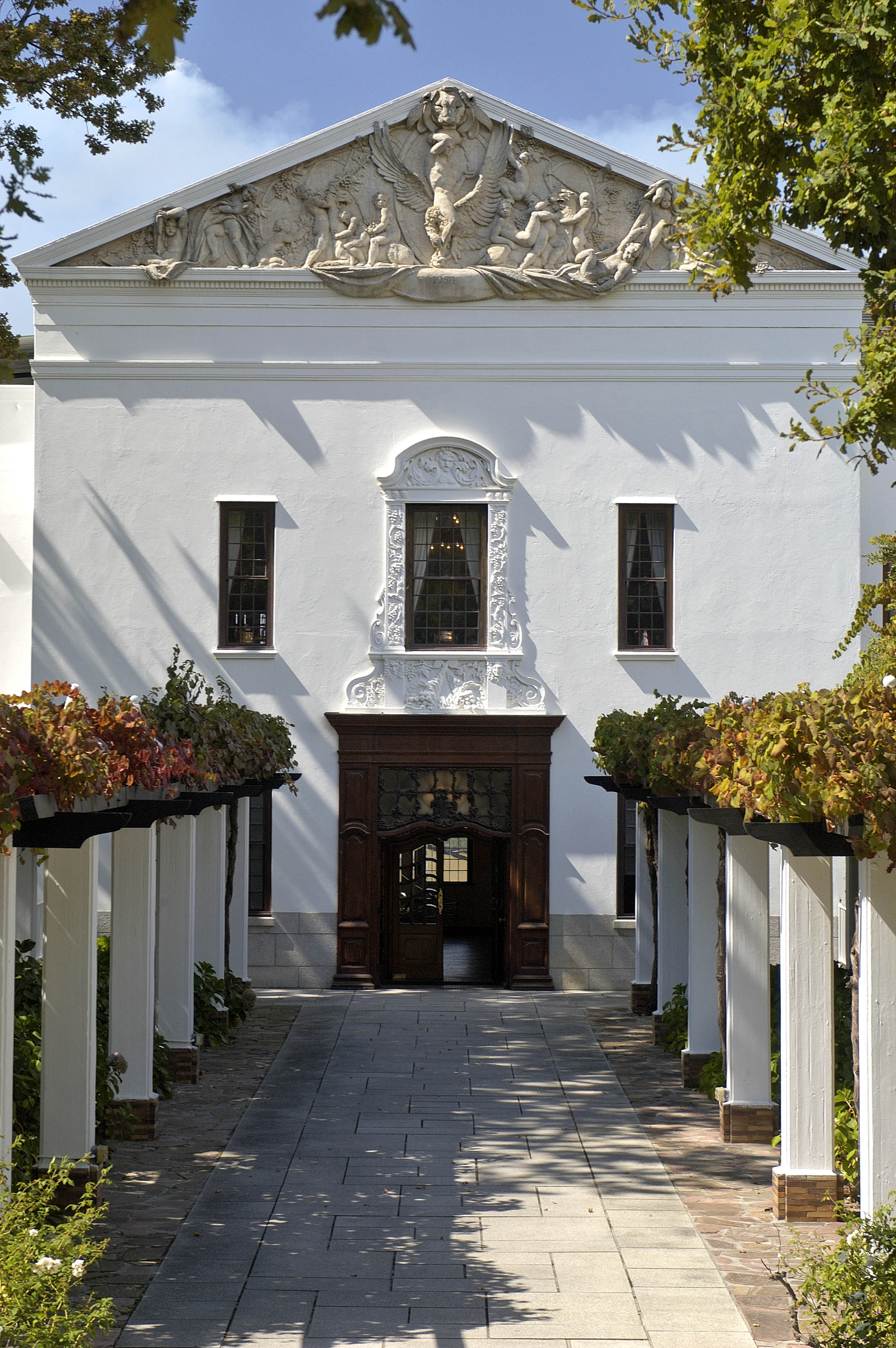
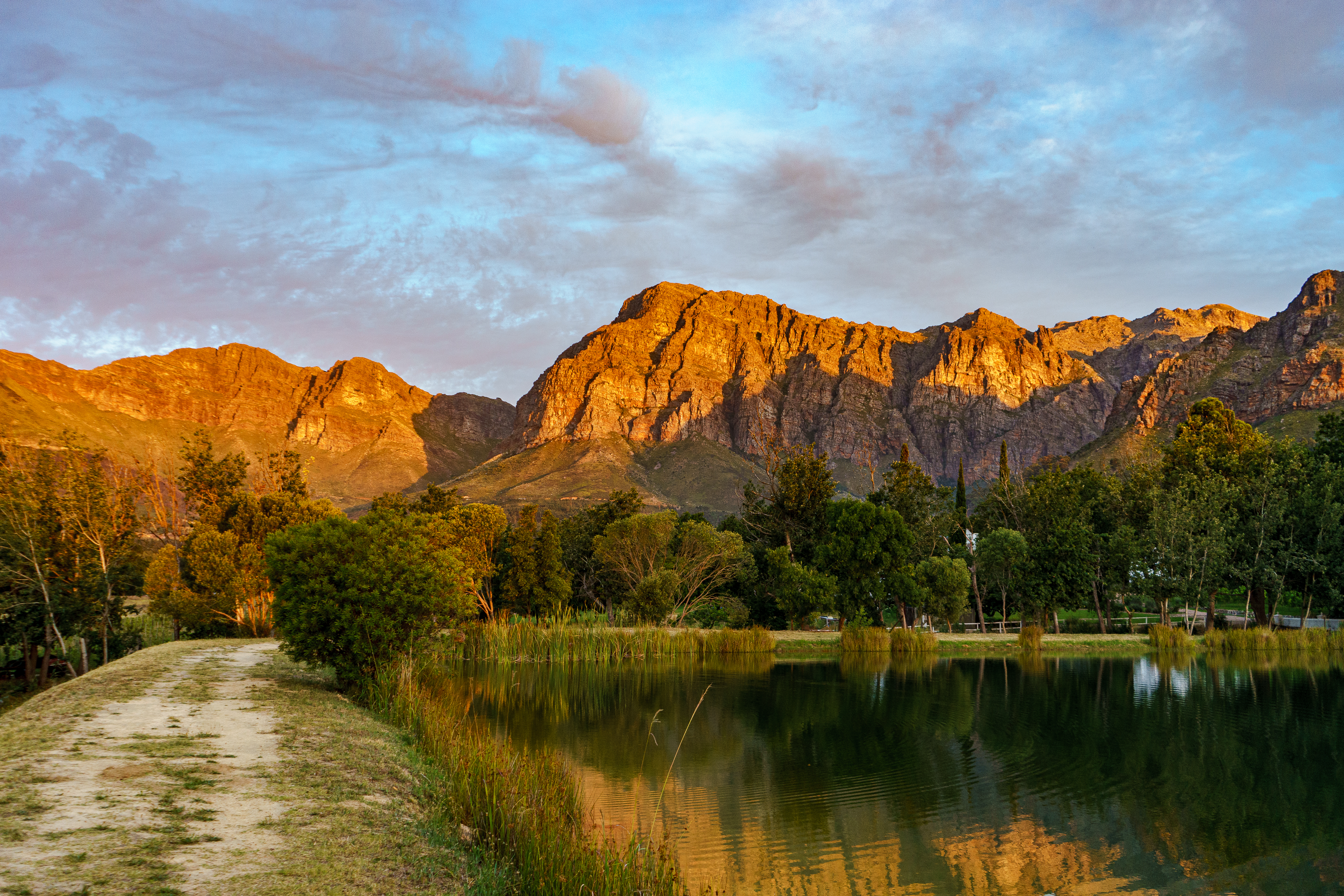
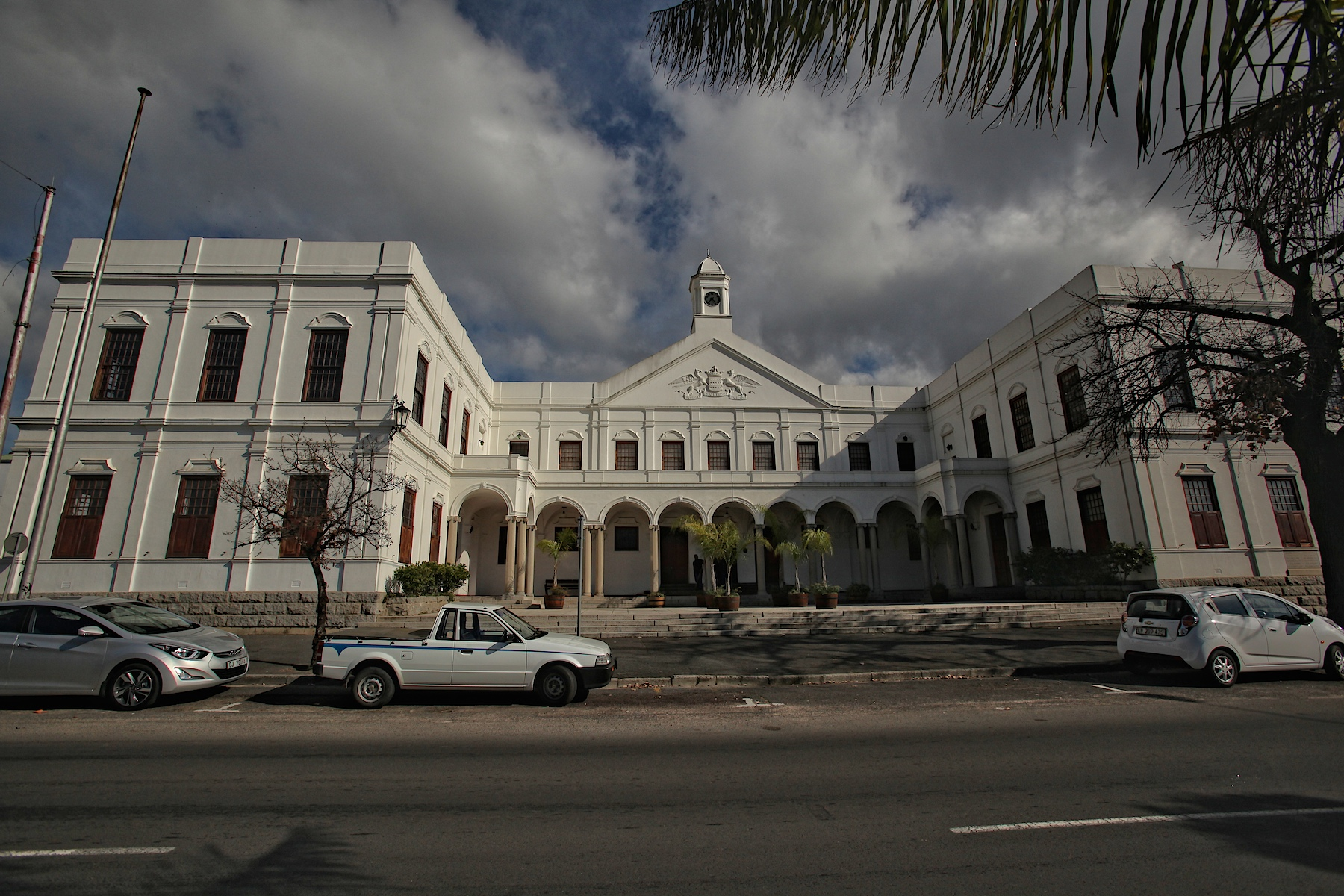
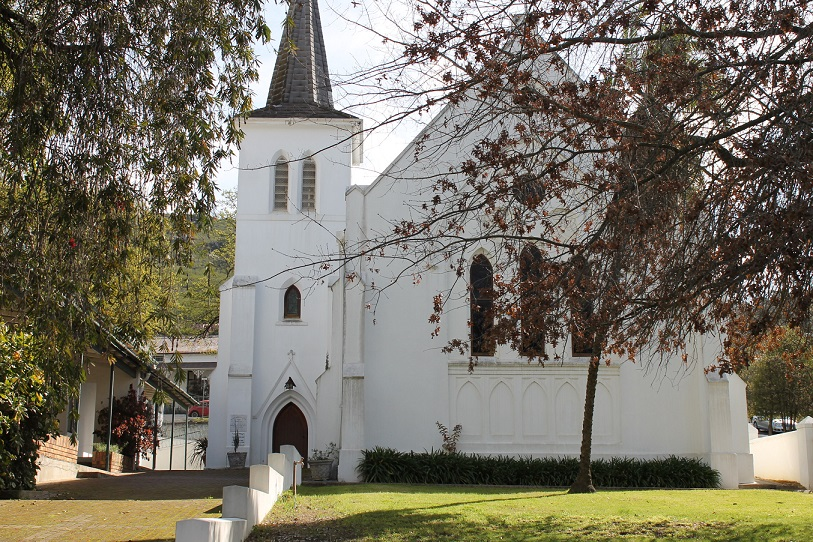
- Clockwise from top: View of Paarl and the Drakenstein Mountains; Toringkerk; Paarl Mountains; St Petri Church; Paarl Town Hall; KWV; Afrikaans Language Monument.

- Coat of arms

- Location within Western Cape Location within South Africa Location within Africa
- Coordinates: 33°43′27″S 18°57′21″E
- Country: South Africa
- Province: Western Cape
- District: Cape Winelands
- Municipality: Drakenstein
- Established: 1839

Area
  - Total: 64.61 km^{2} (24.95 sq mi)
- Elevation: 120 m (390 ft)

Population (2024)
  - Total: 294,457
  - Density: 4,557/km^{2} (11,800/sq mi)

Racial makeup (2011)
  - Black African: 10.4%
  - Coloured: 69.9%
  - Indian/Asian: 0.6%
  - White: 17.9%
  - Other: 1.3%

First languages (2011)
  - Afrikaans: 86.8%
  - English: 6.2%
  - Xhosa: 4.6%
  - Other: 2.4%
- Time zone: UTC+2 (SAST)
- Postal code (street): 7646
- PO box: 7620
- Area code: 021

Paarl (/ˈpɑːrl/; Afrikaans: [ˈpæːrəl]; derived from parel, meaning "pearl" in Dutch) is a town with 294,457 inhabitants in the Western Cape province of South Africa. It is the largest town in the Cape Winelands. Due to the growth of the Mbekweni township, it is now a de facto urban unit with Wellington. It is situated about 60 kilometres (37 mi) northeast of Cape Town in the Western Cape Province and is known for its scenic environment and viticulture and fruit-growing heritage.

Paarl is the seat of the Drakenstein Local Municipality; although not part of the Cape Town metropolitan area, it falls within its economic catchment. Paarl is unusual among South African place-names, in being pronounced differently in English than in Afrikaans; likewise unusual about the town's name is Afrikaners customary attachment to it, saying not in Paarl, but rather in die Paarl, or in die Pêrel (literally, "in the Paarl").

Paarl gained additional international attention when, on 11 February 1990, Nelson Mandela walked, with live international television coverage, out of Victor Verster Correctional Centre (now known as Drakenstein Correctional Centre) in Paarl ending his 27 years of imprisonment, and beginning a course to South Africa's post-apartheid era and, notably, to multi-racial elections. Mandela spent three years in prison here living in a private house within the walls. Today, a bronze statue of Mandela stands outside the prison.

Paarl hosted three matches of the ICC Cricket World Cup 2003. The headquarters of Ceres Fruit Juices is located in the city, although its namesake and source of much of the fruit, Ceres Valley, lies around one hour's drive to the northeast.

The district is particularly well known for its Pearl Mountain or "Paarl Rock". This huge granite rock consists of three rounded outcrops. Paarl Rock consists of intrusive igneous rock.

== History ==
The area that is now known as Paarl was first and is still inhabited by the Khoikhoi. The Peninsular Khoikhoi people and the Cocoqua people live in this area divided by the Berg River Valley. The Cocoqua were cattle-herding people and among the richest of the Khoi tribes. They had between 16,000 and 18,000 members and originally called Paarl Mountain, "!hom ǃnāb/s" which means Tortoise Mountain.

The Dutch East India Company, under the leadership of Jan van Riebeeck, established meat-trading relationships with the Khoikhoi people on the Table Bay coastline. In 1657, in search of new trading relationships inland, Abraham Gabemma saw a giant granite rock glistening in the sun after a rainstorm and named it "de Diamondt en de Peerlberg" (Diamond and Pearl Mountain), from which Paarl is derived. Gabemma (often also spelt Gabbema) was the Fiscal (public treasurer) for the settlement on the shores of Table Bay. The "diamonds" disappeared from the name, and it became known simply as Pearl Rock or Pearl Mountain.

In 1687, Governor Simon van der Stel gave the title to the first colonial farms in the area to "free burghers". The following year, the French Huguenots arrived in the Western Cape and began to settle on farms in the area. The fertile soil and the Mediterranean-like climate of this region provided perfect conditions for farming. The settlers planted orchards, vegetable gardens and, above all, vineyards. Thus began Paarl's long and continuing history as a major wine- and fruit-producing area of South Africa.

In 1875 a congregation was formed out of a desire to be educated in their mother tongue. This was the result of a Reverend GWA van der Lingen idea who tried to motivate and convince people of his principles. The congregation would raise funds and begin construction of a church that would later be known as the "Toring Kerk" (Tower Church). Construction finished in 1905. The church contains materials imported from London and Egypt.

The arrival of the European settlers brought on a conflict with the Khoikhoi people, as land and water resources began to be contested and the Khoi traditions of communal land use came in conflict with the settler's concept of private property. The Khoi peoples were defeated in local war and were further decimated by European diseases. The population scattered inland toward the Orange River or became labourers on settler farms.

== Demographics ==
In the 2001 census Paarl's population was recorded as being 82,713 people in 20,138 households, in a land area of 32.2 square kilometres (12.4 sq mi). A total of 67.8% of the inhabitants described themselves as "Coloured", 21.2% as "White", 10.5% as "Black African", and 0.5% as "Indian or Asian". Regarding language, 85.6% spoke Afrikaans as their first language, 8.5% spoke Xhosa, and 5.2% spoke English.

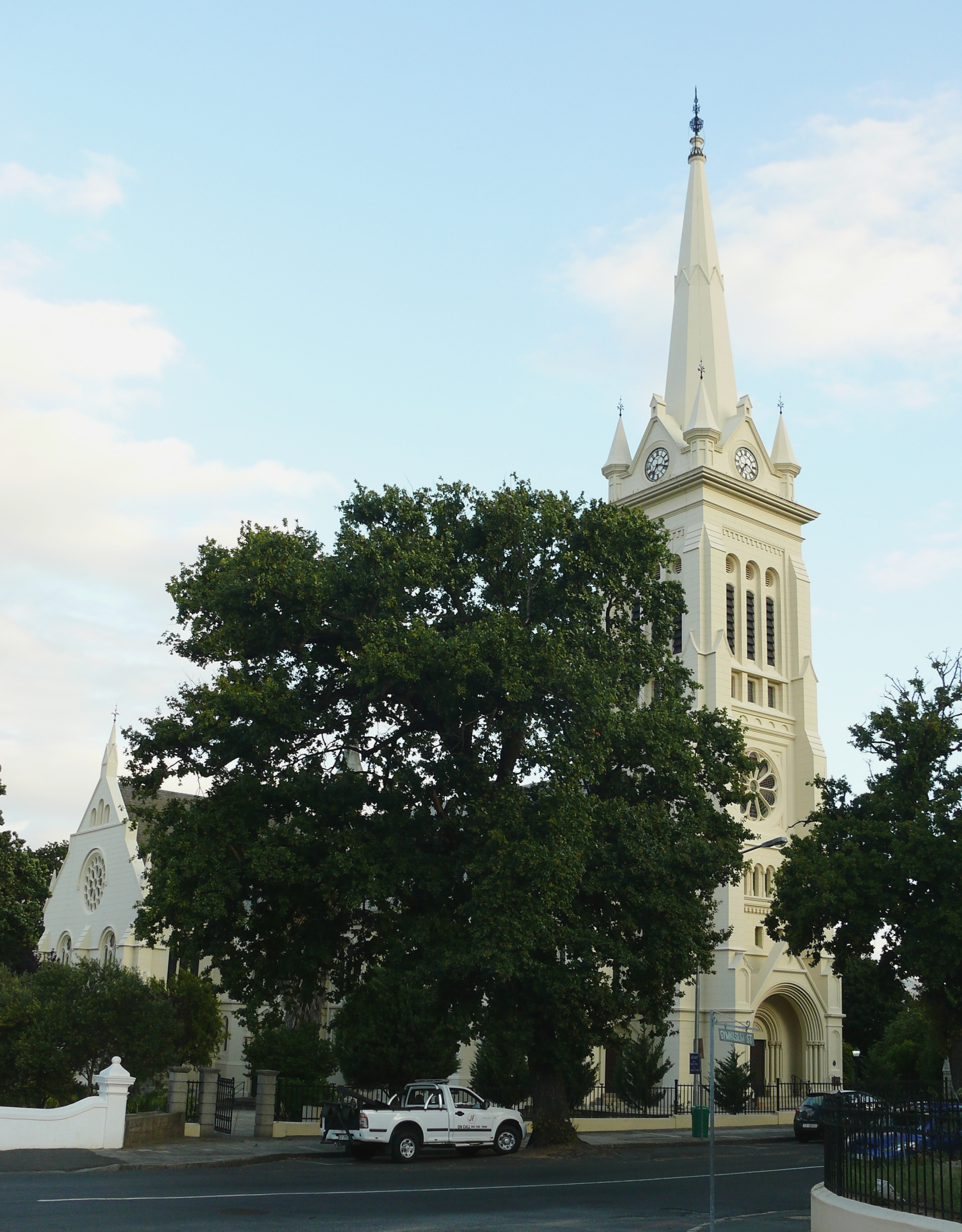
The Tower Church in central Paarl

== Main sights ==
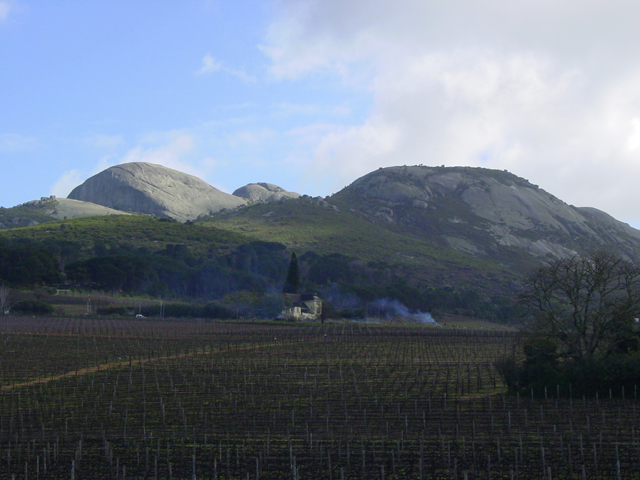
Paarl Rock

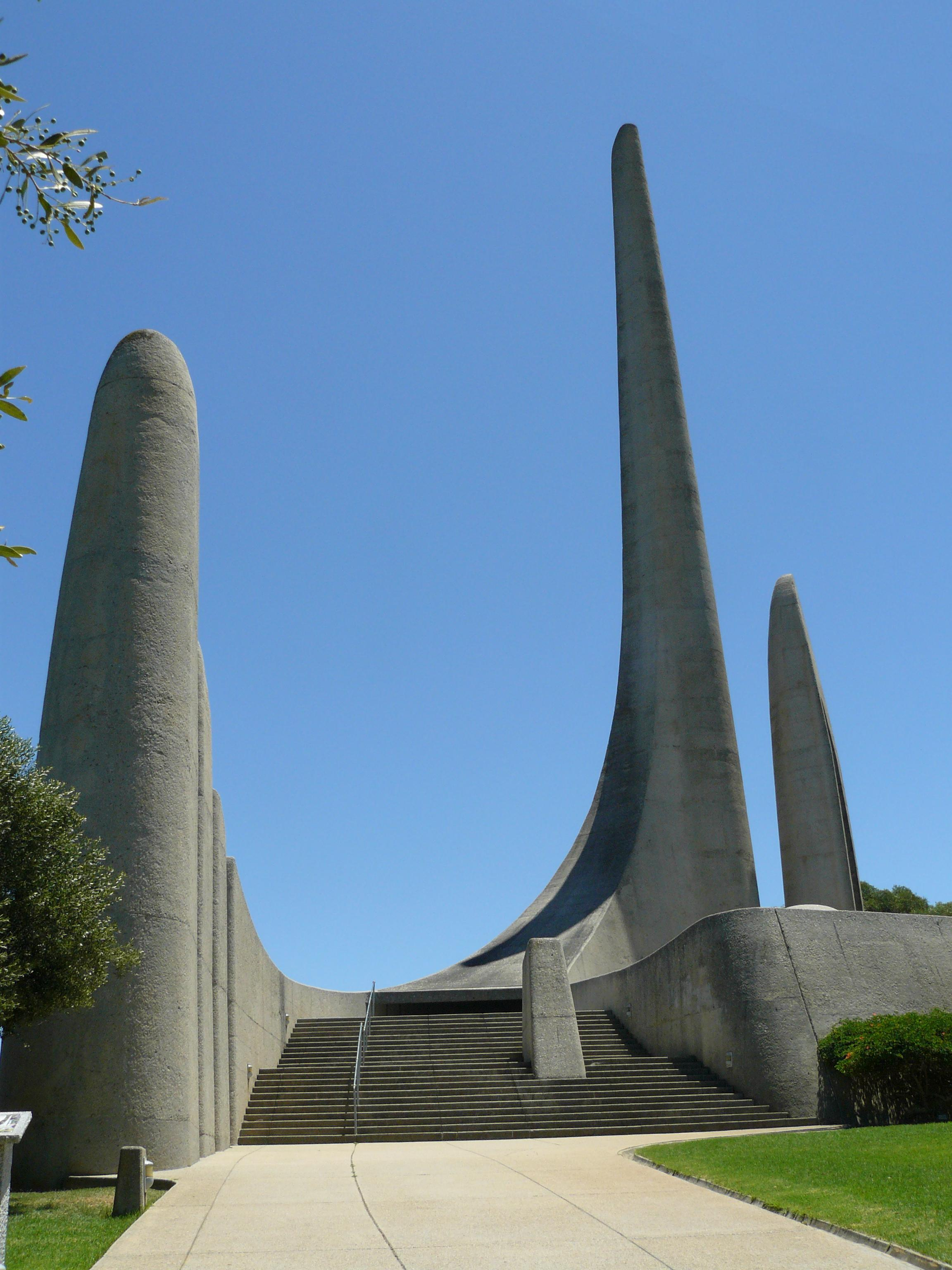
Afrikaanse Taalmonument in Paarl

Like many towns in the Cape Winelands, Paarl is home to many Cape Dutch houses, gardens and streets lined with old oak trees.

Paarl was the place where the foundations of the Afrikaans language were laid by the Genootskap van Regte Afrikaners. The "Afrikaanse Taalmonument" (monument to the Afrikaans language) on the slopes of Paarl Mountain, the Language Museum (Taalmuseum) and the Afrikaans Language Route through Dal Josaphat are memorials to this achievement.

The former headquarters of the wine industry in South Africa is also situated here. This was the "Co-operative Wine Growers' Association" (better known by its Afrikaans initials KWV). KWV became a South African institution that has acquired an international reputation based on its unique achievements and its imprint of quality on the local wine industry. Over the past decade, however, KWV has been privatized and no longer has an administrative role in the South African wine industry. (KWV's main wine production and maturation facilities are on its Paarl premises, while its brandy production takes place in Worcester and grape juice concentrate production in Upington in the Northern Cape.)

Sights include Cape Dutch buildings (17-19th Century), scenic drives, hiking trails, restaurants and the Paarl wine route, with its many wine tasting opportunities.

The old Spice Route Paarl, which was initiated in 1997 by Charles Back, the owner of this estate as well as of Fairview, provides an opportunity for visitors to appreciate and taste local delicacies from the Western Cape. In addition to that, a range of art galleries and the traditional way of organic dark chocolate production can be explored. The heritage of the Spice Route farm goes back to the historical mariners who used to trade Eastern spices to Europe along the "Spice Route" for spice trade in the 15th century.

The Paarl Rock itself is these days a common destination for rock climbers. However, in the pioneering period of rock climbing in South Africa, the mountain was ignored or shunned because its steep faces were so smooth and unfissured that climbers could find no place to attach "runners" or anchor points for belays. The first climbing routes up the rock were pioneered in 1969 by J. W. Marchant and G. Athiros, the former from the University of Cape Town Mountain and Ski Club. Soon afterwards Marchant and John Knight established a few routes on which the rope was run out for 100 m (330 ft) or more with no protection whatsoever. This was in the days before bolting was possible, and these achievements are still held in high regard today. Nowadays protection is afforded by bolts in the granite, and there are on Paarl Rock a few dozen routes that attract the best climbers of the current generation. (All of these climbs remain dangerous for the inexperienced.)

== Districts ==
Amongst the neighbourhoods are De Zoete Inval (a middle-class suburb in the south); Courtrai (a wealthy suburb in the southern part of town); Central Paarl (generally known as Upper-Paarl and also containing a lot of wealthy suburbs); Lemoenkloof (a wealthy suburb between the central and northern parts of town); Northern Paarl (middle-class suburb, including the area of Groenvlei); Denneburg (a middle class suburb) as well as Klein Parys (both in the south-east of the town); Vrykyk (in the south), Charleston Hill (east of the Railway line) and areas in the eastern part of the town such as New Orleans, New York, Amstelhof, Lantana and Klein Nederburg.

There are also large gated communities developed towards the South of the town on the way to Franschhoek, such as Boschenmeer (golf estate), Val de Vie Estate (polo estate) and Pearl Valley (golf estate).

== Education ==
The town boasts some of the best known governmental academic high schools in the country including Paarl Gimnasium High School, La Rochelle Girls' High School, Paarl Boys' High School, Paarl Girls’ High School, Boland Agricultural High, Paulus Joubert High, Noorder Paarl High School, New Orleans Secondary and Klein Nederburg Secondary. Paarl Girls' High was placed 17th in the National Senior Certificate's "Excellence in academic performance" awards in 2012. New Orleans Secondary is the school where the Miss South Africa (2018), Tamaryn Green, completed her secondary education. Independent schools such as Simond Private School (est. 1852) and Bridge House School also feature in this region. Bridge House, listed as one of the most expensive independent schools in South Africa, offers boarding facilities. These schools offer the IEB examinations as distinct from the National Senior Certificate offered by government schools. In August Paarl Gimnasium High School won the Motsepe Kay League Tournament and become one of the two Schools to represent South Africa in Singapore where they took first position and won Gold. The other School from Petsana,Reitz in the Free State came third and won a bronze medal.

== Climate ==
Paarl has a Mediterranean climate (Köppen: Csa).

Climate data for Paarl
Month	Jan	Feb	Mar	Apr	May	Jun	Jul	Aug	Sep	Oct	Nov	Dec	Year
Mean daily maximum °C (°F)	29.7 (85.5)	30.0 (86.0)	28.6 (83.5)	24.8 (76.6)	20.7 (69.3)	18.6 (65.5)	17.7 (63.9)	18.4 (65.1)	20.5 (68.9)	23.6 (74.5)	26.7 (80.1)	28.4 (83.1)	24.0 (75.2)
Daily mean °C (°F)	22.7 (72.9)	23.0 (73.4)	21.6 (70.9)	18.3 (64.9)	14.9 (58.8)	12.8 (55.0)	12.0 (53.6)	12.7 (54.9)	14.5 (58.1)	17.2 (63.0)	19.9 (67.8)	21.5 (70.7)	17.6 (63.7)
Mean daily minimum °C (°F)	15.8 (60.4)	16.1 (61.0)	14.6 (58.3)	11.8 (53.2)	9.1 (48.4)	7.0 (44.6)	6.3 (43.3)	7.0 (44.6)	8.6 (47.5)	10.9 (51.6)	13.2 (55.8)	14.7 (58.5)	11.3 (52.3)
Average precipitation mm (inches)	16 (0.6)	21 (0.8)	26 (1.0)	73 (2.9)	117 (4.6)	132 (5.2)	116 (4.6)	109 (4.3)	61 (2.4)	49 (1.9)	29 (1.1)	21 (0.8)	770 (30.2)
Source: Climate-Data.org

== Transport ==
The N1 national highway is the main freeway intersecting Paarl, running south of the city from the city of Cape Town in the south-west to Worcester and further onwards to Bloemfontein, Johannesburg and Pretoria in the north-east intersecting four on and off-ramp interchanges within Paarl including the R45 Main Road (Exit 55), Cecilia Street (Exit 57), R301 Jan van Riebeeck Drive (Exit 59) and Sonstraal Road (Exit 62) interchanges.

As a regional hub, Paarl is located at the centre of three regional routes including the R45 (Main Road) which runs from Franschhoek and Villiersdorp in the south-west to Malmesbury and Vredenburg in the Cape West Coast which is to the north-west. The R101 (Main Road; Market Street; Langenhoven Avenue) runs from Klapmuts and Kraaifontein in the south-west, passing through Paarl and climbing over the Du Toitskloof Mountains as Du Toitskloof Pass to join the N1 to Worcester. The R101 was the original N1 and served the same function before the construction of the highway. The R301 (Jan van Riebeeck Drive) runs from Franschhoek (via the R45) in the south-west to Mbekweni and Wellington in the north and over the Bainskloof Pass to Ceres in the north-west (via the R43).

== Notable people ==
- Kathleen Aerts, Belgian singer
- Keegan Petersen, South African cricketer
- Lynne Brown, former premier of the Western Cape
- Archie Crail, writer
- Willem de Waal, rugby union player
- Jean de Villiers, rugby union player
- M.L. de Villiers, clergyman
- Peter de Villiers, former coach of the South Africa national rugby union team (Springboks)
- Deetlefs du Toit, former South African politician
- Stephanus Jacobus du Toit, Taalstryder (language warrior)
- Jacob Daniël du Toit (Totius), (born in Paarl in 1877) poet and Taalstryder
- David James, actor
- Wilmot James, former member of Parliament
- Elsa Joubert, author
- Marius Charl Joubert, rugby union player
- Wayne Julies, rugby union player
- Margaret Lawder, botanist
- Eugène Marais, author and poet
- Deon Meyer, thriller novelist
- Ryk Neethling, swimmer, Olympian
- Marianne Kriel, swimmer, Olympian
- Justin Lee Ontong, cricketer with the Cape Cobras
- Wendy Philander, Member of the Western Cape Provincial Parliament
- Conrad Poole, mayor of the Drakenstein
- Karel Schoeman, author
- Gurthro Steenkamp, rugby union player
- Louis Theodor Weichardt, founder and leader of the Greyshirts
- Chester Mornay Williams, rugby union player
- Lee-Anne Pace, professional golfer with 11 tournament wins
- Rhyno Smith, rugby union player

== Coats of arms ==
Municipality (1) — On 18 July 1905, the municipal council accepted a coat of arms presented by Adriaan Moorrees. It was the arms of Hendrik van Reede van Drakenstein : a silver shield charged with two dancetty black bars and crowned with a golden coronet. The supporters were two golden gryphons. The motto was Pour le salut du peuple ("For the wellbeing of the people"). Sometimes, the arms were depicted as silver dancetty bars on a blue shield.

Paarl coat of arms (1951)

Municipality (2) — The arms were re-designed in 1950 by Colin Graham Botha, and granted by the College of Arms on 22 January 1951. They were published in the Cape Province's Official Gazette in 1955, re-granted by the provincial administrator in 1967, and certified by the Bureau of Heraldry in 1969.

In the new version, each of the dancetty bars on the shield displayed two pearls; the supporters were red with blue wings dotted with golden fleurs de lis; and the crest was a red demi-gryphon with blue wings holding a bunch of grapes.

Divisional Council — The divisional council was the local authority which administered the rural areas outside the town. It registered a coat of arms at the Bureau of Heraldry on 20 October 1978. Once again, the Van Reede shield formed the basis of the design. Down the middle of the shield was a red pale displaying a bunch of grapes between two pearls. The crest was a fleur de lis. The motto was Animus et fata ("Courage and fortune").

Mbekweni — The local authority for the predominantly Black township of Mbekweni, which borders with Wellington, registered arms at the Bureau on 5 May 1989. The shield is divided per chevron into red and green, with a golden chevron rompu across the centre and a silver cross pommy below it. Above the arms was a green mural crown decorated with a band of red edged in gold. The motto was uXolo neMpulelelo.

== See also ==
- List of heritage sites in Paarl
