= Laura Kikauka =

- Born: 1963 (age 62–63); Hamilton, Ontario, Canada
- Known for: Electronic Artist
- Notable work: Them Fuckin' Robots

Laura Kikauka (born 1963, Hamilton, Ontario) is a Canadian installation and performance artist. Kikauka is known for her sculptural installations and performances incorporating found objects and electronics.

== Career and work ==
Kikauka is known for functioning hand-etched electronic circuits. Her aesthetic has been described as kitsch, while also being compared to self-organizing systems. She has lived and worked in New York City, and for nearly two decades in Berlin. She currently works in Ontario on her long-term project the Funny Farm.

Kikauka's 1996 piece Hairbrain 2000 presented an early "virtual reality" headset based on an analog system of electronic relays activated by ball bearings as the viewer moved their head.

Her 1988 performance collaboration with artist Norman White, Them Fuckin' Robots involved two robots, a "female" one by Kikauka and a "male" one by White. Both robots were assembled and activated in a single day in front of an audience. Kikauka's robot was an abstract, cloud-like assemblage hanging from the ceiling, powered by an electronic sequencer that activated various combinations of found objects. Her robot produced electromagnetic fields that charged the anthropomorphic "male" robot's capacitor, resulting in an eventual robot orgasm.

Kikauka has built two long-term found object installations, both titled Funny Farm, in her homes in Meaford, Ontario, and Berlin, Germany. She has two permanent installations in Germany: one at the Wolfsburg Science Museum in Wolfsburg, Germany, the other at the Institut für Auslandsbeziehungen in Berlin.

In 1995 the "antipreneurial" one-man artist group Stiletto Studios presented LESS function IS MORE fun as a post-neoist special waste sale of interpassive design-defuncts in Kikauka's so-called Spätverkauf installation at the Volksbühne Berlin, which she claimed as one of her projects of Maximalism.

With her long-term partner Gordon Monahan, Kikauka organizes the annual Electric Eclectics festival in Ontario. Performers have included artist Tony Conrad, thereminist Dorit Chrysler or theremin and tabla playing foodist Gordon W., who they already had conspirated with for more than a decade, during their Berlin residency on several major projects, like Schmaltzwaldt, Fuzzy Love and Bahute Gemutlischkeit. Further on artist John Kilduff, electronic music pioneer Suzanne Ciani, Mary Margaret O'Hara and the Nihilist Spasm Band.

=== Notable exhibitions and performances ===
- FOR THE LOVE OF GAUD/ Damien's Worst (2008/2009). Berlin, Germany/Toronto, Ontario.
- Celebration of Failure (2009). SpaceX, Exeter, England.
- Exactly the Same, but Completely Different (2004). The Power Plant, Toronto.
- Tune In, Turn On (1997). YYZ, Toronto, Canada
- Barbie Bumps her Head (1994). Martin Gropius Bau, Berlin
- Machine Storm (1994). Kampnagel, Hamburg, Germany
- The Impacted Nectarine Vexations of Moldy Vinyl Reincarnations (1992). Gargoyle Mechanique, New York City.
- Tinkerer's Ball (1991). The Exploratorium, San Francisco, California.
- 5 Horen (1988) performance with Hans Peter Kuhn. Ars Electronica, Linz, Austria.
