= Goat tower =

Farm building

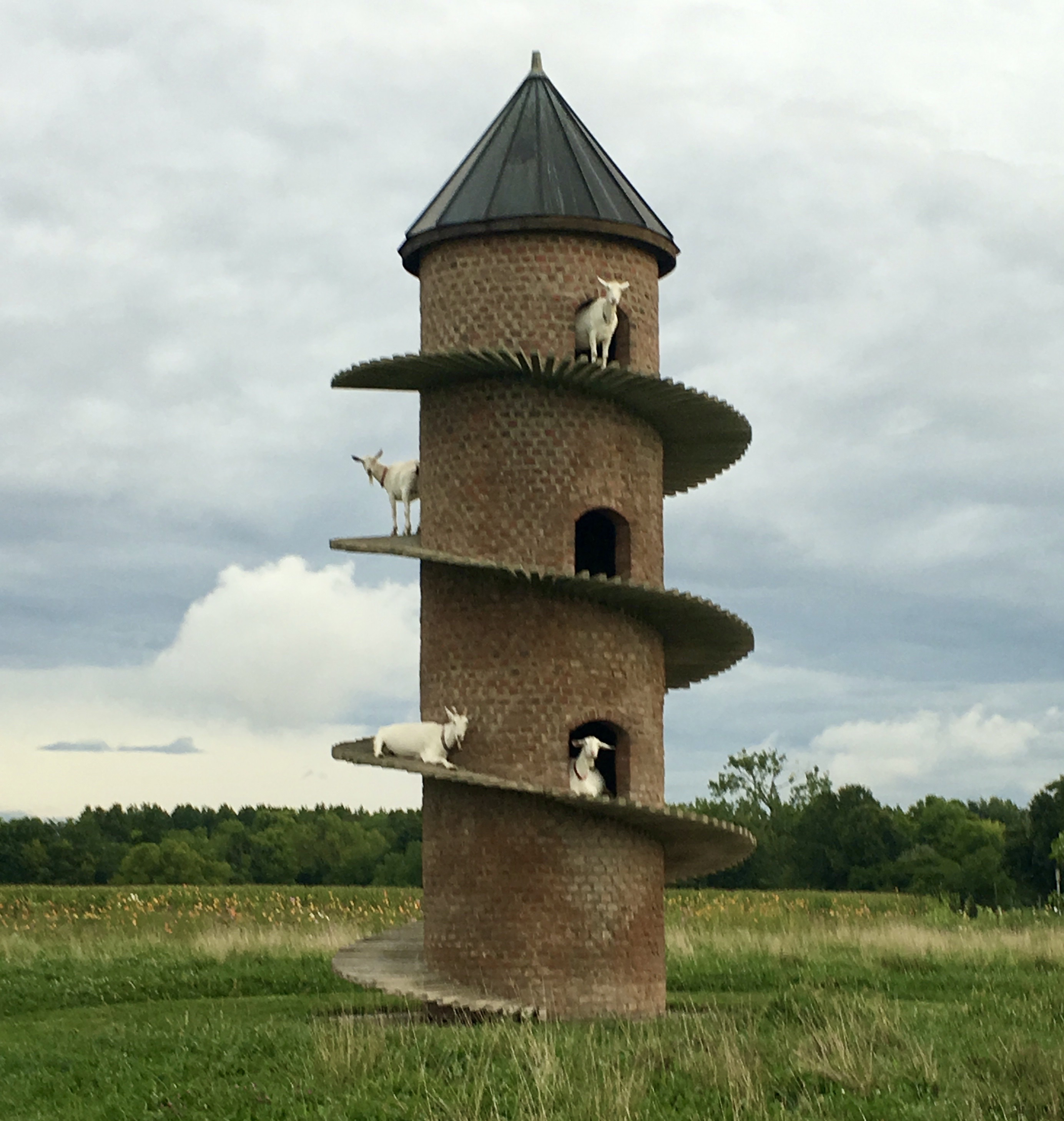
A goat tower in Illinois, US

A goat tower is a multi-story decorative goat house, modeled on a European garden folly, an early example of which was built in Portugal in the 19th century. The first goat tower was built at Aveleda, a winery in Portugal's Vinho Verde region. Since 1981, several other goat towers have been built in South Africa, Norway, Canada, the United States, the United Kingdom, and Argentina; these include three at other wineries. The towers typically are multi-story with climbing ramps spiralling the exterior and often become tourist attractions.

== History ==
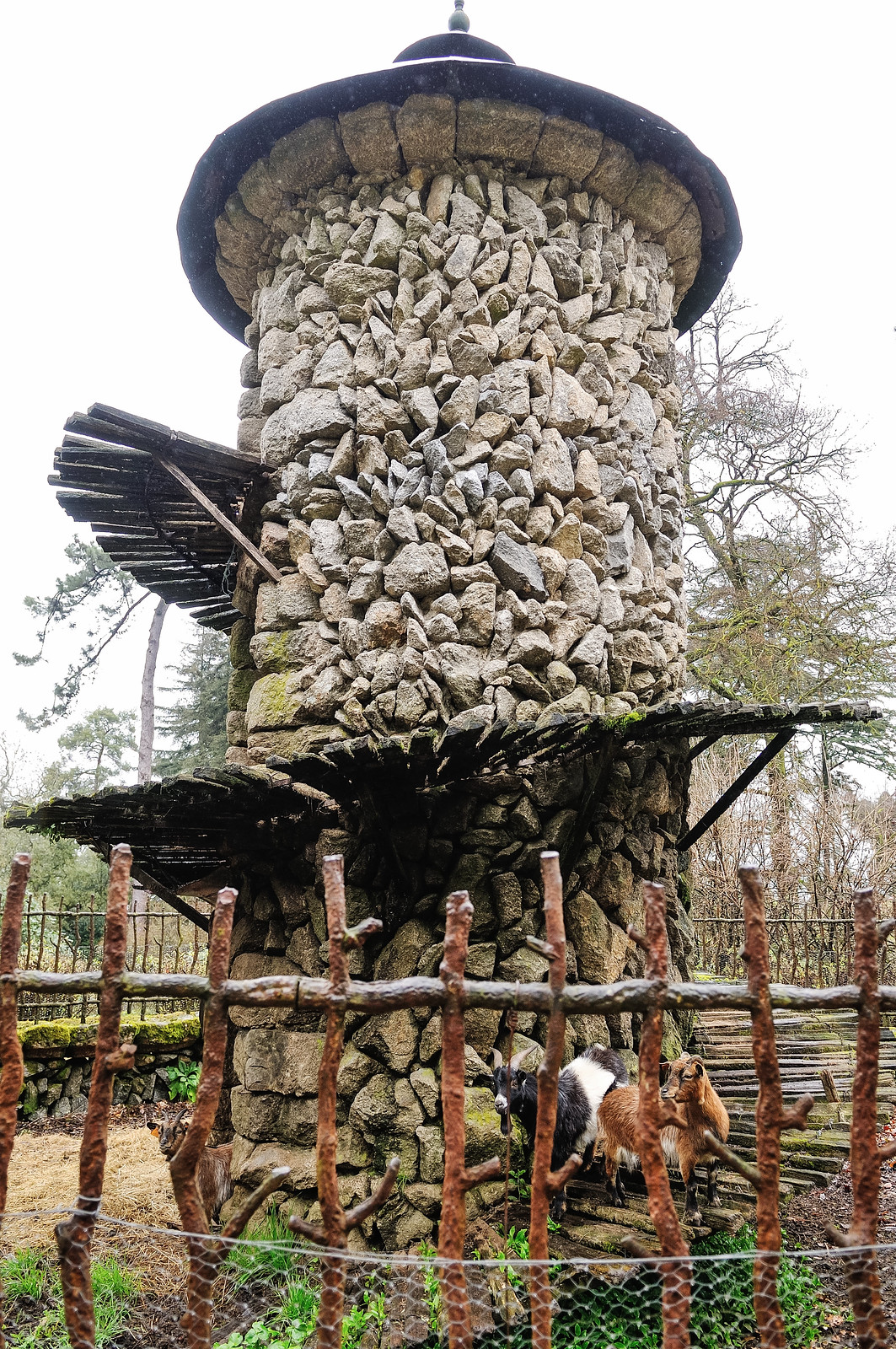
Torre das Cabras at Aveleda, near Penafiel, Portugal

The first goat tower was built in Portugal in the 19th century and modeled on a garden folly. Known as Torre das Cabras (Tower of the Goats), it was built by Fernando Guedes da Silva da Fonseca (1871–1946) at Aveleda, near Penafiel, one of the oldest wineries in the Vinho Verde region of Portugal. The tower is three stories with stone walls and a rightward (climbing counter-clockwise) spiral wooden ramp and is one of several follies on the winery's estate for which their Follies label is named. Each of the follies, which in addition to the Torre das Cabras include the Manuelino-style Window, the Tea House, the Four Sisters Fountain, and the Guard House, is represented on one of the winery's labels.

According to Francisco Guedes Almeida, a member of the 13th generation of the Guedes family to own the winery, the goat tower and the estate's other follies are "artistic daydreams with no functional explanation" built by various of his ancestors, one of whom "thought the goats did not belong to the plains ... so they built the goat tower, so they could have a mountain." The tower symbolizes fertility and abundance.

According to Almeida, he was travelling in South Africa and stumbled across another goat tower and called an uncle to tell him about it. His uncle told him, "You're in Fairview," and related a story of a 1960s visit from a winemaker from South Africa's Fairview Winery who had seen the Aveleda goat tower, was inspired by it, and wrote to the Guedes family to ask permission to build one.

== Examples ==
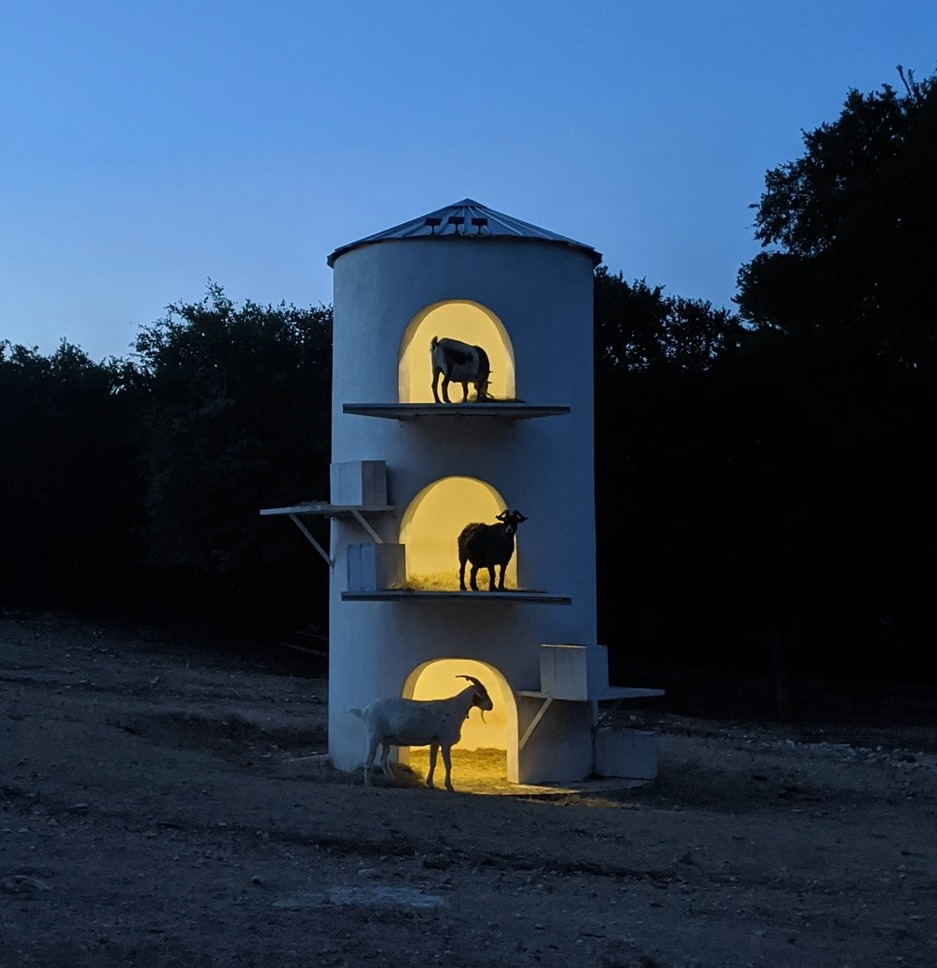
A goat tower in Dripping Springs, Texas at night

Fairview built its goat tower in 1981, after the owner's son visited Aveleda and saw their tower. The tower is used by the winery's herd of 750 Saanen, a breed of Swiss mountain goats. The tower is two stories and is built of brick and mortar. It has a steeply sloped metal roof and a wooden spiral ramp encircling the tower. It is a tourist attraction in the Cape Winelands area.

The winery uses images of the tower and goats in their branding, producing a wine called Goats do Roam, a pun on Côtes du Rhône, and one called Goat Roti, a pun on Côte Rôtie. The names were seen as a derogatory comment on the concept of terroir, which posits that unique environmental factors affect agricultural products such as grapes in ways that preclude calling two wines made from identical grapes grown in different areas by the same name. A 2004 story in Decanter magazine said the name had "irked France's terroir creator and protector, the INAO (Institut National des Appellations d’Origine)", who worry that "some Americans may not see the difference between the wines".

The Fairview tower itself inspired others. In 1998, despite not owning any goats, Illinois farmers David and Marcia Johnson built a 31-foot-tall (9.4 m), 8-foot-diameter (2.4 m) goat tower in Shelby County, near Findlay, after seeing an article on the Fairview tower in the magazine Decanter. The tower is constructed of 5000 hand-made bricks and has 276 steps made of concrete slabs reinforced with rebar. It has six stories. The Johnsons call their structure "The Tower of Baaa". In 2000, the Johnsons purchased 11 Saanen goats, and the tower is now used by their herd; Johnson says, "Goats are the most curious animals in the world so they use the tower a lot. They come and go, passing each other on the ramp." The Johnsons' farm, now called Goat Tower Farm, has become a tourist attraction and has had visitors from as far away as Poland and Costa Rica.

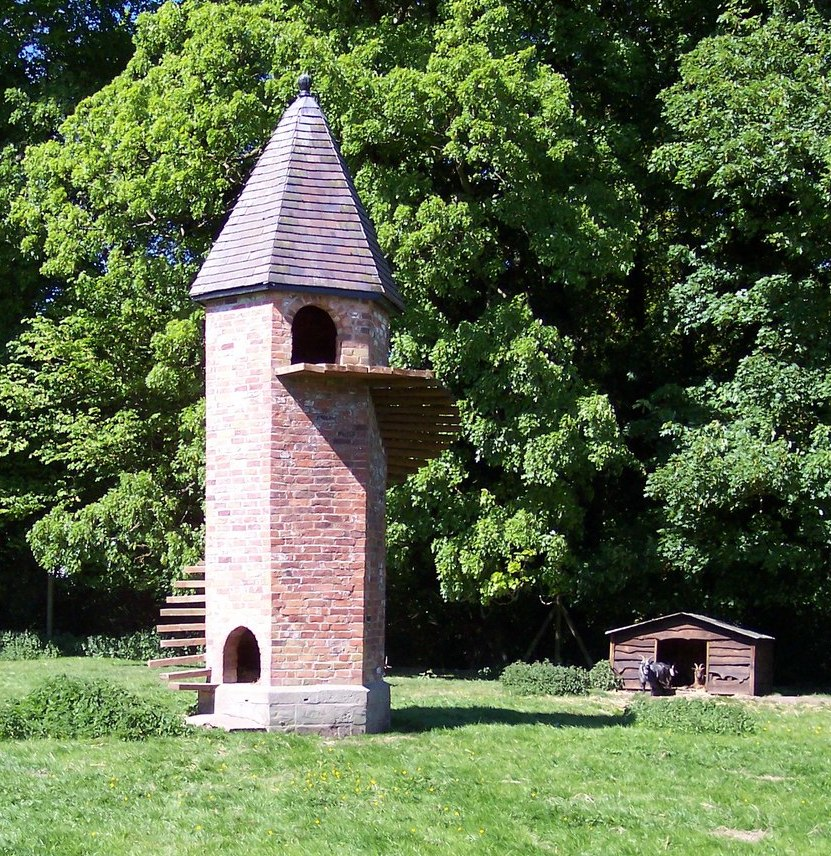
The goat tower at Cholmondeley Castle Gardens in Cheshire

Ekeby, a dairy farm in Moss, Norway, owned by Finn-Erik Blakstad, built a tower based on the Fairview tower and uses images of it in their marketing of the farm's milk and cheese and the on-farm restaurant. Chef Elizabeth Holm, who runs the restaurant at Ekeby, has a tattoo of the goat tower over most of her back.

In 2010, Finca el Rocío, a goat farm in Valle de Calamuchita in Villa General Belgrano, Argentina, built a goat tower for their herd of Anglo-Nubian goats. The tower, which they call Torre de Cabras, was inspired by the Fairview winery and also built using the winery's plans. It has become a tourist attraction.

Hampton Roads Winery in Surry, Virginia, claims to have built at 34 foot (10 m) tall the tallest goat tower in the world to house their herd of Nigerian Dwarf goats after reading about the Fairview tower. The winery has a range of wines named after the tower.

Other examples include Cholmondeley Castle Gardens in Cheshire, UK, which has a goat tower for their herd of pygmy goats in the paddocks area and a goat tower built in the outdoor-seating area of Silky O'Sullivan's bar on Beale Street in Memphis, Tennessee, where customers sometimes share their beer with the goats. In a Waunakee, Wisconsin, goat petting zoo, a steel goat tower built by the Endres Manufacturing Company was designed in a Bavarian style to match other buildings in the area.

In 2018, Henly Hills Farm in Dripping Springs, Texas, USA, owners Darin and Maggie Duvall built a three-story goat tower for their rescued goat herd. The goat tower at Fairview Winery in South Africa inspired the one at Henly Hills, which was hand constructed from cinder blocks and masonry. It has a sloped metal roof and wooden blocks serve as steps onto the tower platforms.

In 2019, the Maryland Zoo built a climbing structure for their herd of goats, calling it a "goat castle".

In May of 2026, Canada's first mural painted goat tower was unveiled, in the township of Blandford-Blenheim, Ontario. The structure is a 28 feet tall pentagon shaped goat tower, located at Udderly Ridiculous Farm Life. The mural has bright colours, and features many animals that are on the farm, including goats.

In the nonsensical 2014 video game Goat Simulator, one of the main objectives is to find and activate goat towers. Upon activation, these towers fill in blank areas of the map and mark quests. The goat towers return with a more dramatic interior and upscaled graphics in the sequel, Goat Simulator 3. These towers continue to be a staple of the series today.

== Reception ==
In 2014, Modern Farmer called goat towers "an idea whose time has come". Since at least 2009, the towers have been a viral meme.
