= Fairview Wine and Cheese =

Coordinates: 33°46′21″S 18°55′25″E

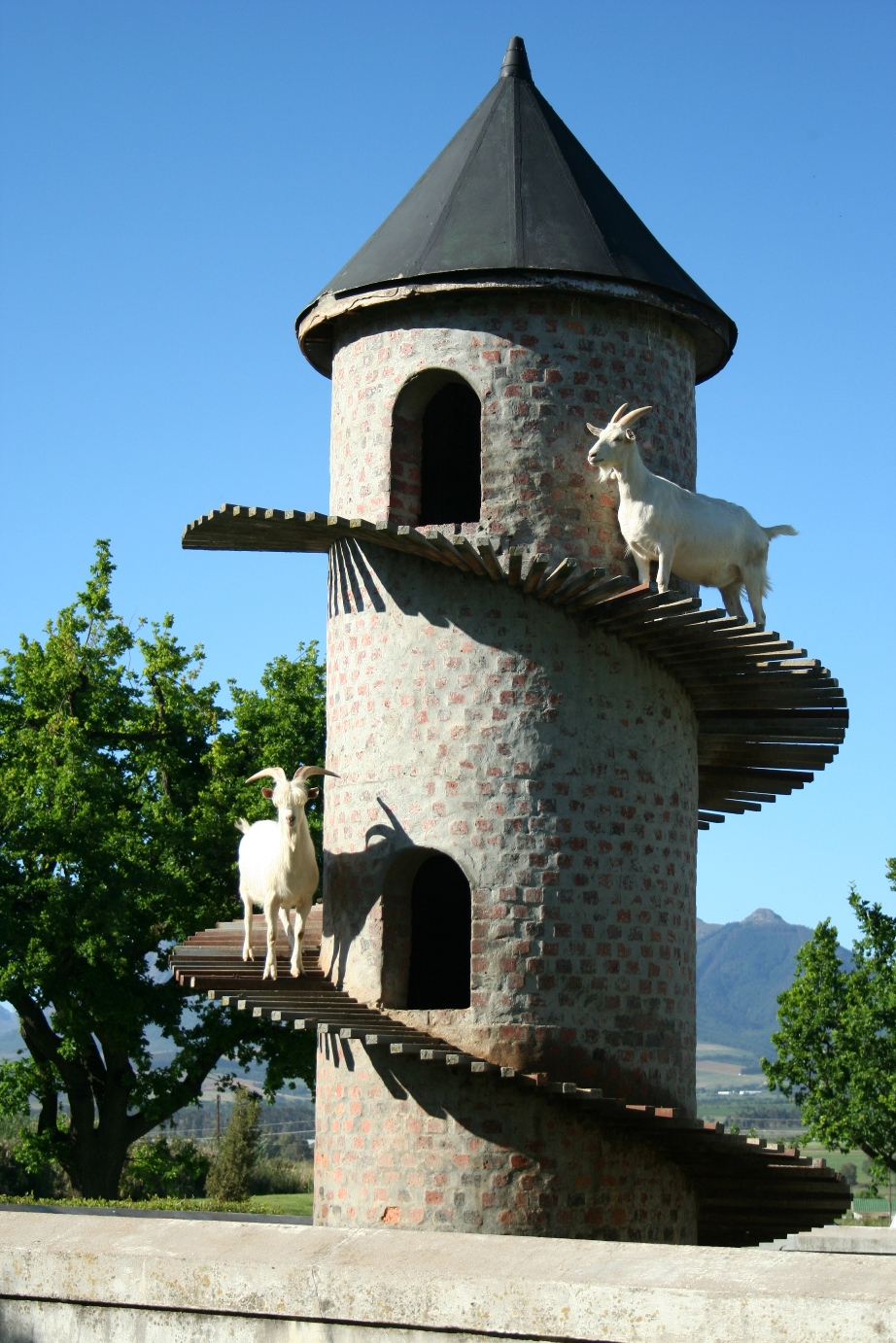
The goat tower at Fairview, Paarl

Fairview Wine and Cheese farm is a South African producer of wines and cheeses based in the Paarl region of the Western Cape province. It is owned and run by Charles Back, who also owns The Goats do Roam Wine Company and The Spice Route Winery.

== Location ==
The Fairview farm is on the south western slopes of the Paarl mountain range, approximately 60 km from Cape Town. The farm comprises 320 hectares, of which 120 hectares are planted to vineyard. The farm ranges in altitude from 400 m above sea level on the slopes of the mountain to 180m on the valley floor. The farm is located at 33°46'21″ south 18°55'25″ east.

== Early history ==
The current Fairview property was first designated as a farm by the then Governor of the Cape Simon van der Stel in 1693, with Steven Vervey the first official owner. Vervey is thought to be one of the French Huguenots who arrived in the Cape in 1688. The earliest recorded name for the property is Bloemkoolfontein (directly translated from Afrikaans as cauliflower fountain) and hints at the mixed agriculture that took place on the property over the centuries. Towards the end of the 19th century the name of the property was officially changed to Fairview. Charles Back purchased the Fairview farm from a Mr Hugo in 1937 for the sum of 6500 pounds. Fairview has been in the Back family to the present day.

== The Backs ==
Charles Louis Back was a Lithuanian immigrant to the Cape, who arrived in South Africa in 1902. He settled in Paarl where he set up a butcher shop as well as selling farm produce from the local farmers. Through these dealings he was offered a piece of land on the farm Klein Babylonstoren in the Paarl winelands. In 1916 Charles Back purchased what would later become the Backsberg farm from David Louw and left the butchery behind to become a wine farmer. In 1926 he was awarded the General Smuts Trophy for South Africa's champion wine. After establishing himself and learning the trade, Charles Back purchased Fairview from Hugo in 1937, for the sum of 6500 pounds. Charles Back had two sons, Sydney and Cyril, in whom Back instilled a love for the land, as well as a strong work ethic. When Charles died in 1955, he left Backsberg to Sydney and Fairview to Cyril.

Cyril spent much of his first years at Fairview replanting and planning vineyards. In 1974, Cyril broke away from the KWV; as a result, the first wines under the Fairview Estate label were bottled in this year. In 1975, Cyril held South Africa's first public wine auction and, together with his wife, Beryl, began to recognise the farm's possibilities of public visitation. Fairview become one of the first farms to open cellar door sales to the public.

Cyril's son, Charles, joined Fairview in 1978, after completing his winemaking studies at Elsenburg agricultural college. In 1981, Charles built Fairview's goat tower.

=== History ===
The first recorded wine production on the property was in 1699 and wine grape cultivation has continued to this day. When Charles Back purchased Fairview in 1937 the farm was primarily planted to the then common varietal Cinsau(l)t, and this formed the majority of the wine produced at Fairview in the 1940s and 1950s.

When Cyril Back took over in 1955, following his father's death, he replanted most of the Fairview vineyards. He introduced Cabernet Sauvignon, Shiraz and Pinotage to the property. In 1974 Cyril Back was amongst the first producers to break away from the strictly regulated body controlling South African wine at the time, where grape growers supplied their grapes to the co-operative KWV. He established Fairview as an independent estate and the first wines were bottled under the Fairview label in 1974, from grapes grown exclusively on the Fairview property. The first wines bottled were a Cabernet Sauvignon, Shiraz and Pinotage. In 1975 Cyril Back held South Africa's first public wine auction, with his entire 1975 production selling in under three hours. This auction pre-dated the now famous Nederburg Auction, which started the following year.

With Charles Back joining his father in 1978, Fairview's range of wines began to diversify, with white wines being added to the portfolio and new varietals being planted. Charles also introduced innovative winemaking practices. Using the Gamay varietal, Fairview produced South Africa's first Beaujolais nouveau style wine in 1987 using the traditional carbonic maceration method. During the late 1980s Charles began watch the international wine trends more closely, making subtle adjustments to bring the quality of his wines in line with international standards. These markets had always been closed to South African wines due to Apartheid sanctions. Charle's proactive approach meant that when democracy came to South Africa and the markets opened, Fairview's wine style and quality was quickly recognised internationally. Cyril Back died in 1995 and Charles took full control of Fairview. In 1997 Charles Back appointed Anthony de Jager as head winemaker at Fairview.

=== Current production ===
Approximately 50 000 twelve bottle cases are produced under the Fairview label annually. Seventy percent of Fairview's production is exported, with the company's leading export markets being the United States, Canada, the United Kingdom, Sweden and Germany. In 2008 Fairview launched the La Capra range of wines, an endorsed label targeting the retail and value end of the wine market.

=== Grape varietals ===
Fairview produces a wide range of varietals under its label and 70% of production is red wine. Grapes for these wines are sourced from Charles Back's own vineyards as well as from contracted growers.
Amongst others, the Fairview range of wines includes:
White wines: Sauvignon Blanc, Riesling, Chardonnay, Viognier, Oom Pagel Semillon and Viognier Special Late Harvest.
Red wines: Shiraz, Pinotage, Mourvèdre, Cabernet Sauvignon, Merlot, Tannat, Petite Sirah, Pinotage Viognier, Sweet Red, Solitude Shiraz, The Beacon Shiraz, Jakkalsfontein Shiraz, Pegleg Carignan, Primo Pinotage and the farm's flagship Cyril Back.

== Cheesemaking at Fairview ==
=== History ===
Cheese production at Fairview started in 1980, when Cyril Back purchased a herd of Saanen milking goats and brought them to the farm. At the time, goats milk cheese was an unknown product in South Africa. Cyril employed the assistance of Michele Agostinelli to begin the Fairview Vineyard Cheesery, producing a small range of goats' milk cheeses for sale from the farm. In 1992, Louis Lourens was employed as head cheese maker. In 1995 Jersey milk was introduced and subsequently the range of cheeses produced expanded to include cow's milk cheeses as well as a range of products combining cow and goats' milk.

=== Current production ===
Fairview is South Africa's leading producer of artisanal and speciality cheeses. In 2008, the Fairview goat herd is the largest commercial goat herd in Africa, numbering 750 does in the permanent milking herd. The milk from these goats, along with the milk from an exclusive single Jersey cow herd are brought to the Vineyard Cheesery daily. There are over twenty permanent lines in the Fairview cheese range, including blue mould, white mould and cream cheese products. These products are available at major retailers throughout South Africa.

== Tourism ==
Fairview Wine and Cheese estate is one of the most visited attractions in the Cape winelands. The farm offers tasting of its full range of wines and cheeses in their tasting room, seven days a week. There is also an eatery on the farm, which is housed in a converted wine cellar. Wine tourism has seen strong growth in South Africa and Fairview's combination of wine and cheese is very popular amongst locals as well as international tourists.

== See also ==
- Goat tower
- Spice Route Paarl
- South African wine
