= Norman White =

Canadian new media artist

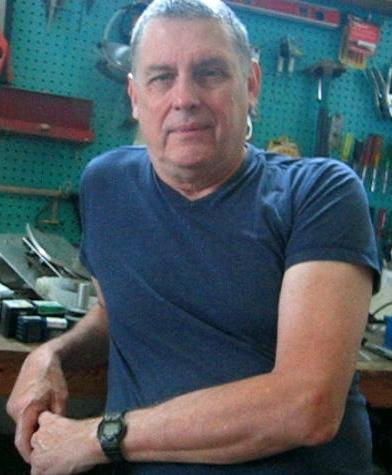
- Norman White
- Born: Norman T. White; January 7, 1938 (age 88); San Antonio, Texas, United States
- Education: Harvard University
- Known for: Electronic Media Artist, sculptor, Educator
- Movement: New Media

Norman White (born January 7, 1938, in San Antonio Texas) is a Canadian new media artist considered to be a pioneer in the use of electronic technology and robotics in art.

== Life ==
White was born in San Antonio Texas in 1938. He grew up in and around Boston, Massachusetts, and obtained his B.A. in Biology from Harvard University in 1959. Originally planning to become a fisheries biologist, White changed his mind and decided to travel to places like New York City, San Francisco, London, and the Middle East during the 1960s.

While living in San Francisco, he worked as an electrician at Hunter's Point Naval Shipyard, and developed a fascination for electrical switching systems. In London England, 1965-1967, he began to experiment with electronics. He then moved to Toronto, Ontario, Canada, where he began creating a series of kinetic, digital logic driven light machines. His first artwork utilizing Resistor–Transistor Logic "RTL" integrated circuits was shown in the E.A.T. sponsored group exhibition entitled "Some More Beginnings", in 1969, at the Brooklyn Museum. From 1978 to 2003. White taught classes such as "Mechanics for Real Time Sculpture" as part of the Integrated Media Program of the Ontario College of Art & Design

A retrospective of his work and influence, called Norm’s Robots and Machine Life, with works by both White and several Canadian artists he has influenced, was shown at the Agnes Etherington Art Centre, Kingston, Ontario in 2004.

From 1992 to 2003, White was an essential force behind the OCAD Sumo Robot Challenge, an annual competition akin to an automaton Olympics.

From 2003 to 2016, White taught in the New Media program in the Radio Television Arts Department of Ryerson University, Toronto, Ontario. He retired from teaching in 2016.

== Work ==
=== Early light works ===
White's early electronic art consisted mostly of gridded installations of light bulbs controlled by contemporary-vintage digital logic circuits. Like most of his art, these displays were concerned more with communicating internal rules and behaviours than simple visual appeal. For example, White's first major electronic work, "First Tighten Up on the Drums" (1969), generated shimmering light patterns through the unpredictable interaction of many interconnected circuits computing simple logical questions independently. The work illustrated how complex behaviours - for example, patterns akin to swirling clouds or rain on a window pane - can emerge from simple principles. In retrospect, White recognizes this first project as an early cellular automata experiment. He constructed approximately a dozen similar light machines during the early 1970s, culminating in "Splish Splash 2" (1975), a large light mural commissioned for the Canadian Broadcasting Corporation's Vancouver offices.

=== Computer-based and robotic works ===
Following the purchase of his first computer, a Motorola D-1, in 1976, White refocused his attention on the emerging field of robotics, and during the mid- to late-1970s began making interactive machines whose internal logic expressed itself primarily through motion. "Menage" (1974) was White's first robotic work, and again demonstrated his interest in exploring complex behaviours generated from simple principles. Four robots mounted upon ceiling tracks were fitted with photo-sensitive scanners and programmed to recognize and react to light sources mounted on the other robots. The machines competed for one another's attention as they moved automatically along the overhead tracks.

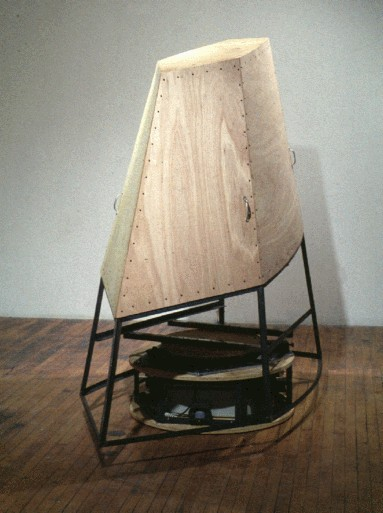
The Helpless Robot

Subsequent robotic projects have included: "Facing Out Laying Low" (1977), a stationary interactive robot designed to react to interesting behaviour in the gallery space surrounding it, and "Funny Weather" (1983), a robotic artificial weather system with interacting wind generators and sensors. His early networked art piece "Telephonic Arm Wrestling" (1986, with Doug Back) used telephone data links to enable patrons to arm wrestle each other at a great distance. The work was performed in real time between the Canadian Cultural Centre in Paris, France and the Artculture Resource Centre in Toronto, Ontario, Canada. Some critics consider this piece to be a pioneering work in networked and long distance kinesthetic art. A later work, "Them Fuckin' Robots" (1988), a collaboration with Laura Kikauka, investigated simulated sex.

In "The Helpless Robot" (1987–96), an electronically synthesized voice asks for the physical assistance of passers-by with a persuasive tone. Over time, the voice slowly changes to a more forceful, commanding tone, complaining when the interaction is not being completed properly.

== Collections ==
White's work is included in the permanent collection of the National Gallery of Canada.

== Awards ==
Norm White was awarded for a lifetime of innovation in art with the 2018 Digifest Media Pioneer Award. He was the prize winner of the d.velop digital art award [ddaa] in 2008. He won the 1995 Petro Canada Award. In 1990 White received an award of distinction at the Prix Ars Electronica for The Helpless Robot.
