= Gusty Back =

Luxembourgish footballer

Personal information
- Date of birth: 15 October 1927
- Date of death: 22 November 2010 (aged 83)

International career
Years	Team	Apps	(Gls)
1951–1955	Luxembourg	9	(0)

Gusty Back (15 October 1927 – 22 November 2010) was a Luxembourgish footballer. He played in nine matches for the Luxembourg national football team from 1951 to 1955. He was also part of Luxembourg's squad for the football tournament at the 1952 Summer Olympics, but he did not play in any matches.
