= Pär-Erik Back =

Swedish social scientist

Pär-Erik Back (1920–1988) was a Swedish social scientist. He was professor at Umeå University 1965–85 in political science, serving also as dean for the social sciences.

== Publications ==
- Herzog und Landschaft (1955),
- En klass i uppbrott (1961),
- Sammanslutningarnas roll i politiken 1870–1970 (1967),
- Det svenska partiväsendet (1967; 2nd edition 1978).
