= Doug Back =

Canadian artist (1954)

- Born: 1954 (age 70–71); Toronto
- Occupation: artist
- Known for: electronic artist
- Awards: Petro Canada Award for Media Arts

Doug Back (born 1954) is a Canadian media artist.

== Career ==
Back is noted for his early contributions to the field of media art. He was a frequent artistic and academic collaborator with Canadian media artist Norman White. One of their most widely cited works together is Telephonic Arm Wrestling (1986), an arm-wrestling performance conducted between Paris and Toronto over telephone lines. Together, they were pioneers in the early teaching of physical computing at the Ontario College of Art and Design.

== Awards ==
In 1989, Back received the Petro Canada Award for Media Arts, administered by the Canada Council for the Arts.
