= Immanuel Bäck =

Finnish politician

Jacob Immanuel Bäck (25 May 1876 – 7 March 1939) was a Finnish Lutheran clergyman and politician. He was a member of the Parliament of Finland from 1922 to 1924 and again from 1927 to 1930, representing the Swedish People's Party of Finland (SFP). He was born in Vaasa, the younger brother of Johannes Bäck.
