= Johannes Bäck =

Finnish politician (1872–1952)

Alfred Johannes Bäck (1 September 1872 – 22 March 1952) was a Finnish Lutheran clergyman and politician. He was a member of the Parliament of Finland from 1907 to 1913 and again from 1916 to 1919, representing the Swedish People's Party of Finland (SFP). He was born in Lappajärvi, and was the elder brother of Immanuel Bäck.
