= Guy Back =

Luxembourgish footballer

Personal information
- Date of birth: 7 December 1959 (age 66)
- Position: Forward

Senior career*
Years	Team	Apps	(Gls)
1979–1986	Progrès Niederkorn		

International career
1980–1981	Luxembourg	4	(0)
- * Club domestic league appearances and goals

Guy Back (born 7 December 1959) is a retired Luxembourgish football striker.
