= KWV South Africa =

South African wine and spirits producer

KWV
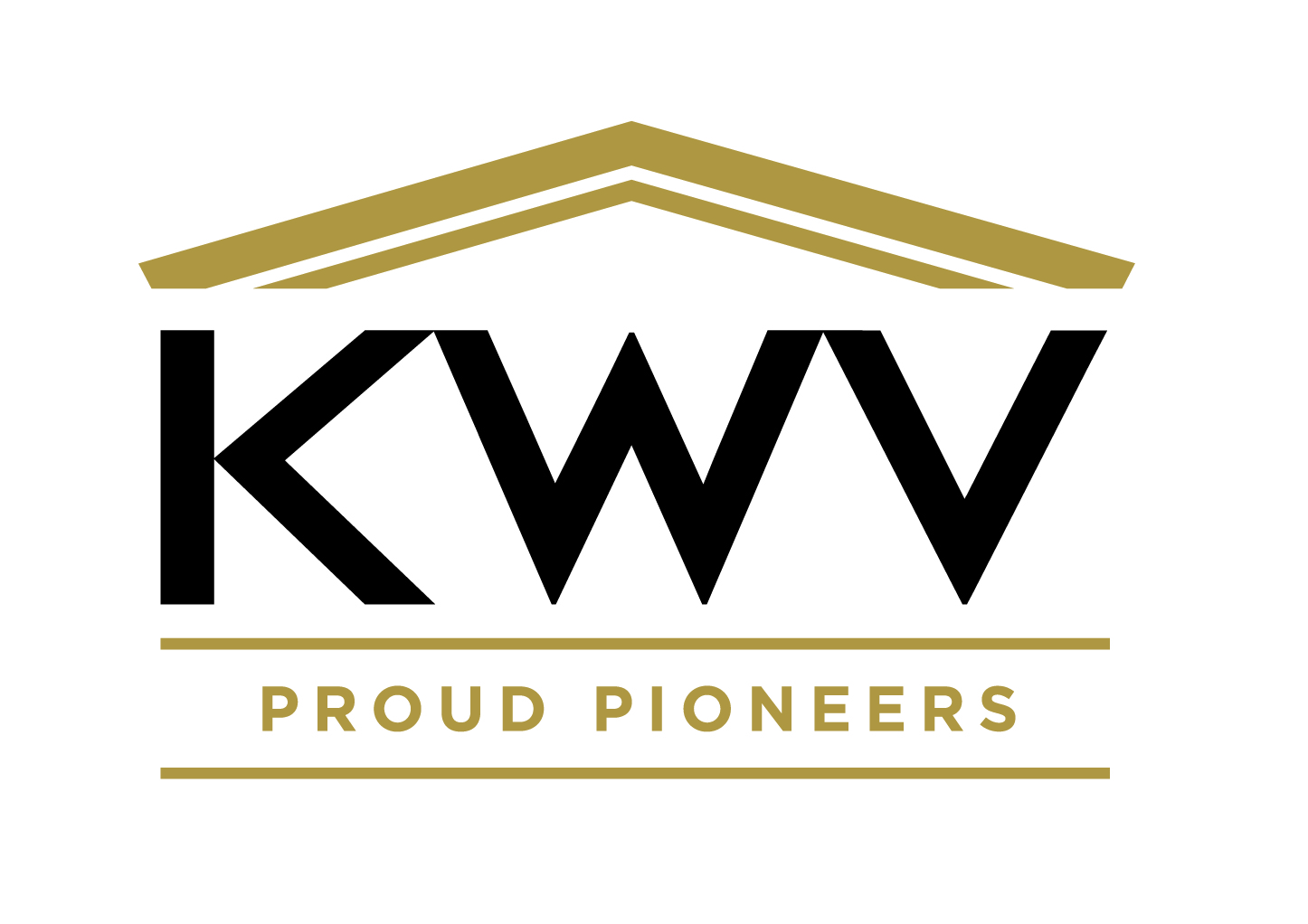

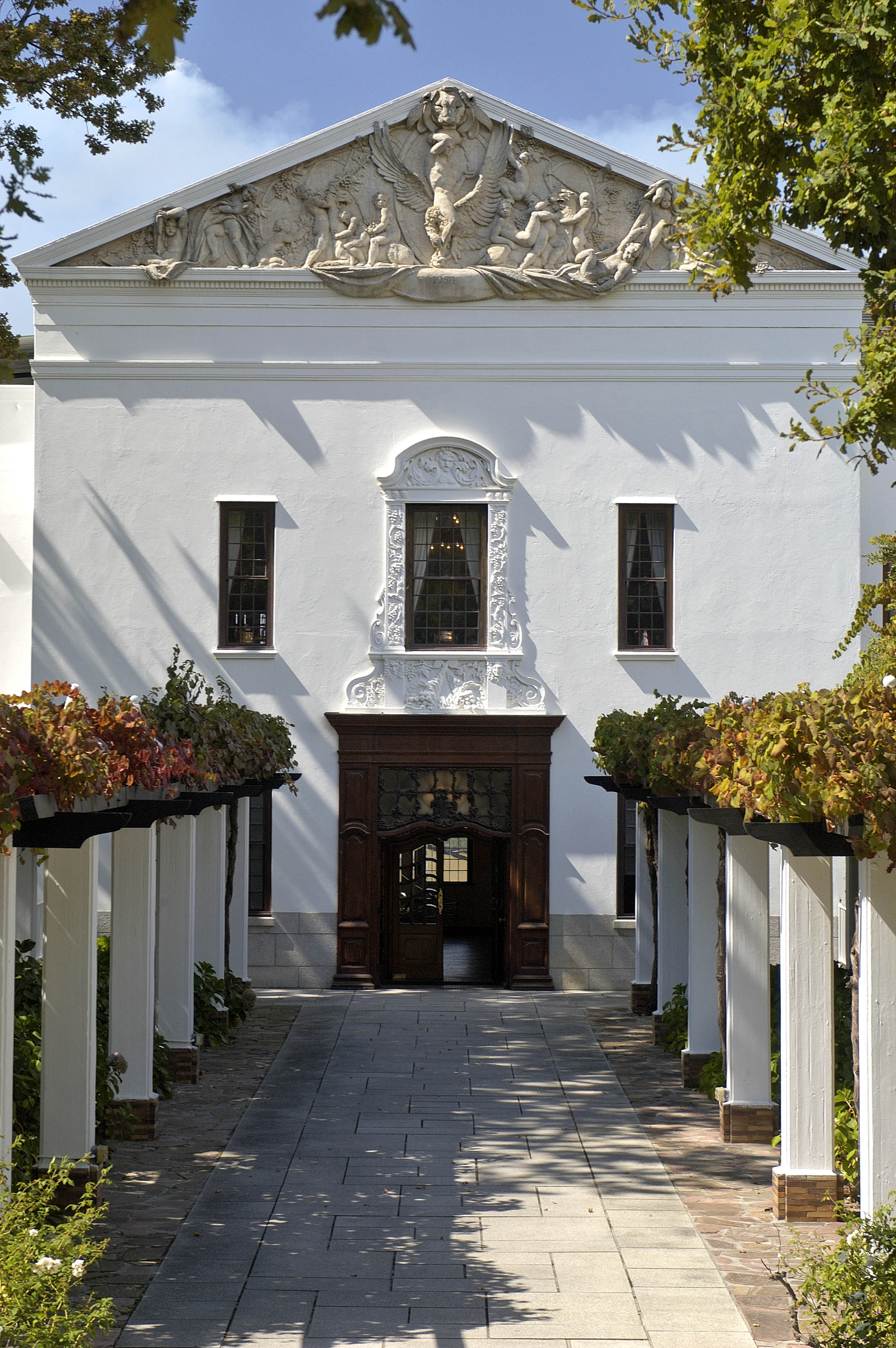
- Head office
- Company type: Private company
- Industry: Wine, Spirits & Beverage
- Founded: 8 January 1918; 108 years ago
- Founder: Dr. Charles Kohler
- Headquarters: Paarl, South Africa
- Key people: John Loomes - CEO
- Parent: Vasari
- Website: kwv.co.za

KWV South Africa (Proprietary) Limited (founded as Ko-operatiewe Wijnbouwers Vereniging van Zuid-Afrika) is a South African wine and spirits producer. Its brands include Roodeberg, KWV Wines & KWV Brandies, and Laborie.

== History ==
KWV was founded as a winemaking co-operative on 8 January 1918 by wine makers from the Western Cape in South Africa, with Dr. Charles Kohler as its chairperson. The name “Koöperatieve Wijnbouwers Vereniging van Suid-Afrika” is Dutch for "Co-operative Winemakers Union' of South Africa".

The purpose of KWV was to create unity amongst the wine farmers of South Africa and to ensure continuous improvement in the quality of South African wines and brandies. From the early 1920s, the co-operative was granted increasing legislative control over the production, sale and export of South Africa's distilling wine and spirits, which allowed the body to experiment with innovations in the industry which aided its development. The organisation also invested a great deal in the promotion of South African wine and brandy both locally and abroad. KWV's legal hand over the industry was lifted with the end of Apartheid in 1990 and subsequent change in government, and in 1997 converted from a co-operative to a company structure.

In 2004, KWV negotiated the South African wine industry's largest Broad-Based Black Economic Empowerment (BBBEE) deal with Phetogo (Pty) Ltd, attaining 25.1% shares. For the first time, KWV products entered the local market with its branded wines and brandies, having previously only been available to international consumers. In 2010, KWV formed a subsidiary of Niveus Investments, part of the HCI black empowerment investment group, and was the only South African producer listed on Drinks International's Most Admired Wine Brands Global register.

In 2016, KWV was acquired by the London-based investment firm Vasari for ZAR 1.15 billion. In 2024, Masimong Group and Rand Merchant Bank (RMB) became minority shareholders of KWV.

== Description ==
The KWV Headquarters and main production complex are situated in the Cape Winelands in Paarl.

KWV is South Africa's second largest brandy producer, producing around 15-million liters annually. It sources its base wine from 60 cooperatives and 52 vineyards, using mostly chenin blanc and colombard grapes.
