= Charles Back =

South African businessman

Charles Louis Back is the third-generation owner of South African wine and cheese producer Fairview, in Paarl in the Western Cape province. Fairview Estate is a third-generation family-owned farm, located on the slopes of the Paarl Mountain in the winelands of the Western Cape.

== Career and winemaking philosophy ==
Charles Back studied winemaking at Elsenburg Agricultural College in Stellenbosch. He officially joined his family's company in 1978 and took over full control in 1995 after his father, Cyril, died. Following the fall of Apartheid in South Africa and the lifting of economic sanctions, Back initiated marketing and sales on the international market. Back is also the owner of The Goats do Roam Wine Company and The Spice Route Winery, which is a wine cellar in the Swartland region of the Western Cape.

Back has brought a number of new grape varietals to South Africa and is one of the country's original Rhône Rangers. He was the first producer to plant Viognier vineyards in the country, and has the largest plantings of Mourvèdre. Back also bottled South Africa's first single varietal Petite Sirah. He is of the opinion that the majority of South African vineyards should be planted to more Mediterranean and Rhône style varietals, as opposed to the Bordeaux ones that have typically been favoured.

== Other achievements ==
In April 2006, South African WINE Magazine voted Back the second most influential person in the South African wine industry, after Nelson Mandela.

In 2007 Back was nominated as one of UK publication Harpers most influential personalities in the wine industry

The KWV appointed Back onto their advisory winemaking committee in 2007, tasked with assisting the company with their quality and production strategy.

In 2017, Back was awarded the 1659 Wine Industry Medal of Honour 2017 and the South African Farmer of the Year 2017.
