= List of heritage sites in Paarl =

This is a list of the heritage sites in Paarl as recognized by the South African Heritage Resource Agency.

SAHRA identifier	Site name	Description	Town	District	NHRA status	Coordinates	Image
9/2/068/0037	De Rust Local Area, General		De Rust	Paarl			Upload Photo
9/2/069/0001	Dal Josafat, Paarl District (SAHRA owned)		Paarl	Paarl		33°42′00″S 19°01′00″E	
9/2/069/0001/001	Roggeland, Daljosafat, Paarl District	The Goede Rust was originally granted in 1693. The farms in this valley were for centuries in the hands of the French Huguenots and their descendants. There are approximately 14 historic buildings in the Cape Dutch or Victorian Style. Type of site: Farm Complex.	Paarl	Paarl	Provincial Heritage Site	33°41′25″S 19°00′09″E	The Goede Rust was originally granted in 1693. The farms in this valley were for centuries in the hands of the French Huguenots and their descendants. There are approximately 14 historic buildings in the Cape Dutch or Victorian Style. Type of site: Farm Complex.
9/2/069/0001/001-01	Main House, Roggeland, Daljosafat, Paarl District	Type of site: Farmhouse.	Paarl	Paarl	Provincial Heritage Site	33°41′25″S 19°00′09″E	Upload Photo
9/2/069/0001/001-02	Wine cellar, Roggeland, Daljosafat, Paarl District	Type of site: Wine Cellar.	Paarl	Paarl	Provincial Heritage Site	33°41′25″S 19°00′09″E	Upload Photo
9/2/069/0001/001-03	Jonkershuis, Roggeland, Daljosafat, Paarl District	Type of site: Jonkershuis.	Paarl	Paarl	Provincial Heritage Site	33°41′25″S 19°00′09″E	Upload Photo
9/2/069/0001/001-04	Cottage, Roggeland, Daljosafat, Paarl District	Type of site: Labourer's Cottage.	Paarl	Paarl	Provincial Heritage Site	33°41′25″S 19°00′09″E	Upload Photo
9/2/069/0001/002	Non Pareille, Daljosafat, Paarl District	Type of site: Farm Complex. The Daljosafat Cultural Landscape is significant because of its idyllic setting, rich history associated with living heritage and a distinctive cultural environment. It boasts a distinct Cape Vernacular Architecture.	Paarl	Paarl	National Heritage Site	33°41′25″S 19°00′09″E	Upload Photo
9/2/069/0001/002-01	Main House, Non Pareille, Daljosafat, Paarl District	Type of site: Farmhouse.	Paarl	Paarl	Provincial Heritage Site	33°41′25″S 19°00′09″E	Upload Photo
9/2/069/0001/002-02	Wine cellar, Non Pareille, Daljosafat, Paarl District	Type of site: Wine Cellar.	Paarl	Paarl	Provincial Heritage Site	33°41′25″S 19°00′09″E	Upload Photo
9/2/069/0001/002-03	Jonkershuis, Non Pareille, Daljosafat, Paarl District	Type of site: Jonkershuis.	Paarl	Paarl	Provincial Heritage Site	33°41′25″S 19°00′09″E	Upload Photo
9/2/069/0001/002-04	Cow shed, Non Pareille, Daljosafat, Paarl District	Type of site: Cow Shed.	Paarl	Paarl	Provincial Heritage Site	33°41′25″S 19°00′09″E	Upload Photo
9/2/069/0001/002-05	Large shed, Non Pareille, Daljosafat, Paarl District	Type of site: Shed.	Daljosafat	Paarl	Provincial Heritage Site	33°41′25″S 19°00′09″E	Upload Photo
9/2/069/0001/002-06	Cottage #1, Non Pareille, Daljosafat, Paarl District	Type of site: Labourer's Cottage.	Paarl	Paarl	Provincial Heritage Site	33°41′25″S 19°00′09″E	Upload Photo
9/2/069/0001/003	Goede Rust, Daljosafat, Paarl District	Type of site: Farm Complex.	Paarl	Paarl	Provincial Heritage Site	33°41′25″S 19°00′09″E	Upload Photo
9/2/069/0001/003-01	Main House, Goede Rust, Daljosafat, Paarl District	Type of site: Farmhouse.	Paarl	Paarl	Provincial Heritage Site	33°41′25″S 19°00′09″E	Upload Photo
9/2/069/0001/003-02	Wine cellar, Goede Rust, Daljosafat, Paarl District	Type of site: Wine Cellar.	Paarl	Paarl	Provincial Heritage Site	33°41′25″S 19°00′09″E	Upload Photo
9/2/069/0001/003-03	Wagon House, Goede Rust, Daljosafat, Paarl District	Type of site: Wagon House.	Paarl	Paarl	Provincial Heritage Site	33°41′25″S 19°00′09″E	Upload Photo
9/2/069/0001/003-04	Cottage, Goede Rust, Daljosafat, Paarl District	Type of site: Labourer's Cottage.	Paarl	Paarl	Provincial Heritage Site	33°41′25″S 19°00′09″E	Upload Photo
9/2/069/0001/003-05	Labourers' cottage #1, Goede Rust, Daljosafat, Paarl District	Type of site: Labourer's Cottage.	Paarl	Paarl	Provincial Heritage Site	33°41′25″S 19°00′09″E	Upload Photo
9/2/069/0001/003-06	Labourers' cottage #2, Goede Rust, Daljosafat, Paarl District	Type of site: Labourer's Cottage.	Paarl	Paarl	Provincial Heritage Site	33°41′25″S 19°00′09″E	Upload Photo
9/2/069/0001/005	Hugo Cemetery, Daljosafat, Paarl District	This is a complex of three separate farms which had been consolidated. Type of site: Graveyard. The farms Non Pareille and Goede Rust were originally granted in 1690 and Roggeland in 1693. These farms were for centuries in the hands of the French Huguenots and their descendants. There are approximately 14 historic buildings in the Cape Dutch or Victorian styles.	Paarl, Daljosafat	Paarl	Provincial Heritage Site	33°41′31″S 19°00′07″E	Upload Photo
9/2/069/0001/4	see 9/2/069/0052		Paarl	Paarl	National Monument		Upload Photo
9/2/069/0002	PAARL MUNICIPAL AREA, GENERAL		Paarl	Paarl	National Monument		Upload Photo
9/2/069/0002-280	159 and 161 Main Street, Paarl	An elongated house, now with a hipped iron roof and loft-windows and divided into 2 units, each with a door flanked by windows dating from c1870. The central facade section is set forward under an eaves-line string-course, suggesting the former presence of a gable.	Paarl	Paarl	Provincial Heritage Site	33°46′38″S 18°57′25″E	An elongated house, now with a hipped iron roof and loft-windows and divided into 2 units, each with a door flanked by windows dating from c1870. The central facade section is set forward under an eaves-line string-course, suggesting the former presence of a gable.
9/2/069/0003	Bien Donne, Groot Drakenstein, Paarl District	The house is H-shaped, has been both restored and much altered inside. The original front, with its straight-sided but elaborately decorated gable dated 1800 and its shuttered casements, is intact. Granted in 1691 to Pierre Lombard. This impressive H-shaped gabled house was built by Dawid de Villiers in 1800. It was bought by Rhodes Fruit Farms in 1929 and transferred to the government in 1936 as a fruit research centre. Type of site: Farm Complex.		Paarl	Provincial Heritage Site	33°51′48″S 18°58′37″E	The house is H-shaped, has been both restored and much altered inside. The original front, with its straight-sided but elaborately decorated gable dated 1800 and its shuttered casements, is intact. Granted in 1691 to Pierre Lombard. This impressive H-shaped gabled house was built by Dawid de Villiers in 1800. It was bought by Rhodes Fruit Farms in 1929 and transferred to the government in 1936 as a fruit research centre. Type of site: Farm Complex.
9/2/069/0004	108 Main Street, Paarl	This elongated house with its Victorian verandah dates from the 1850s and was presumably an earlier Cape Dutch house that was later Victorianised. The property forms an integral part of the historic core of Paarl.	Paarl	Paarl	Provincial Heritage Site	33°44′53″S 18°57′44″E	This elongated house with its Victorian verandah dates from the 1850s and was presumably an earlier Cape Dutch house that was later Victorianised. The property forms an integral part of the historic core of Paarl.
9/2/069/0005	232 Main Street, Paarl		Paarl	Paarl	National Monument	33°44′22″S 18°57′46″E	Upload Photo
9/2/069/0006	De Nieuwe Plantatie, Plantasie Street, Paarl	Type of site: House; Previous use: House. Current use: Hotel.	Paarl	Paarl	Provincial Heritage Site	33°45′06″S 18°57′31″E	Type of site: House Previous use: House. Current use: Hotel.
9/2/069/0007	La Concordia, Cecelia Street, Paarl	These properties form an integral part of the historical and architectural nucleus of Paarl. The houses on these erven, the majority of which date from the nineteenth century, are representative of the Cape Dutch, Georgian, Victorian and Edwardian building styles.	Paarl	Paarl	Provincial Heritage Site	33°45′34″S 18°58′12″E	Upload Photo
9/2/069/0008	D'Olijfboom, 469 Main Street, Paarl	T-shaped house, one of the few in the northern part of the Main Street. It has a square gable dated 1852 and late-straight end-gables with pseudo-pediments (i.e. a horizontal string-course dividing off a small triangle at the top). Said to stand on a deduction from Optenhorst. These properties form an integral part of the historical and architectural nucleus of Paarl. The houses on these erven, the majority of which date from the nineteenth century are representative of the Cape Dutch, Georgian, Victorian and Edwardian styles.	Paarl	Paarl	Provincial Heritage Site	33°43′12″S 18°57′49″E	T-shaped house, one of the few in the northern part of the Main Street. It has a square gable dated 1852 and late-straight end-gables with pseudo-pediments (i.e. a horizontal string-course dividing off a small triangle at the top). Said to stand on a deduction from Optenhorst. These properties form an integral part of the historical and architectural nucleus of Paarl. The houses on these erven, the majority of which date from the nineteenth century are representative of the Cape Dutch, Georgian, Victorian and Edwardian styles.
9/2/069/0009	Gideon Malherbe House, 11 Parsonage Avenue, Paarl	This double-storeyed 5-bay house - a good example of the restrained, Georgian-based architecture of the early-Victorian period with the noble proportions of its tall sash windows. In this Georgian house, then the residence of Gideon J. Malherbe, the "Genootskap van Regte Afrikaners" was founded on 14 August 1875. The object of this Society was ".. to stand for our language, our nation and our country". Current use: Museum.	Paarl	Paarl	Provincial Heritage Site	33°44′03″S 18°57′48″E	Upload Photo
9/2/069/0010	Old Zion Church, Zion Street, Paarl	A large, T-shaped whitewashed church with its entrance in one of the ends of the 'cross-bar' of the T. It has a low-pitched iron roof, and the facade, in which the entrance is set, facing down the little street, has a straight gable topped by a small belfry. Type of site: Church.	Paarl	Paarl	Provincial Heritage Site	33°44′37″S 18°57′40″E	A large, T-shaped whitewashed church with its entrance in one of the ends of the 'cross-bar' of the T. It has a low-pitched iron roof, and the facade, in which the entrance is set, facing down the little street, has a straight gable topped by a small belfry. Type of site: Church. Media related to Zion Church, Paarl at Wikimedia Commons
9/2/069/0011	The Huguenot Monument and Memorial Museum Complex, Franschhoek, Paarl		Franschhoek	Paarl	National Monument	33°54′49″S 19°07′28″E	Upload Photo
9/2/069/0012	1ain Street, Paarl	These properties form an integral part of the historical and architectural nucleus of Paarl. The houses on these erven, the majority of which date from the nineteenth century, are representative of the Cape Dutch, Georgian, Victorian and Edwardian building styles.	Paarl	Paarl	Provincial Heritage Site	33°44′43″S 18°57′45″E	These properties form an integral part of the historical and architectural nucleus of Paarl. The houses on these erven, the majority of which date from the nineteenth century, are representative of the Cape Dutch, Georgian, Victorian and Edwardian building styles.
9/2/069/0013	169 Main Street, Paarl		Paarl	Paarl	Provincial Heritage Site	33°44′42″S 18°57′54″E	
9/2/069/0014	FRANSCHHOEK MUNICIPAL AREA, PAARL DISTRICT, GENERAL		Franschhoek	Paarl	National Monument		Upload Photo
9/2/069/0015	Old Post Office & old gaol, 227/227A Main Street, Paarl		Paarl	Paarl		33°44′22″S 18°57′46″E	Upload Photo
9/2/069/0016	Eendevlei Farm, Paarl District		Paarl	Paarl	Pending Register		Upload Photo
9/2/069/0017	Onderdal School, Daljosafat, Paarl District	The historical Onderdal school building, with the adjoining teacher's residence. The Onderdal School was founded in 1847. Building work on the new school commenced late in 1854 and the building was inaugurated on 31 May 1855. The school was officially opened on 5 June 1855 and was used until 1968, when it was finally closed. Type of site: School. Previous use: School. Current use: Dwelling and school museum. Historical and architectural interest	Paarl	Paarl	Provincial Heritage Site	33°41′25″S 19°00′09″E	Upload Photo
9/2/069/0018	School complex, Simondium, Paarl District		Paarl	Paarl	National Monument	33°50′27″S 18°57′36″E	Upload Photo
9/2/069/0018/001	Het Sticht, Simondium, Paarl District	Type of site: Church		Paarl	Provincial Heritage Site	33°51′01″S 18°57′58″E	Upload Photo
9/2/069/0019	Nederburg, Paarl District	A large late H-shaped house with a stoep right round it. Ornate front rococo gable. It has weak wingless scrolls at its base; the inner pilasters run up only as high as the head of the gable window, from which level they are linked with the edge mould b The farm was granted to Philippus Bemardus Wolfaart, who arrived at the Cape in the eighteenth century. At the end of 1791, when the Dutch East India Company offered many of its properties for sale in an attempt to pay off its debts, Wolfaart obtained a st.	Paarl	Paarl	Heritage Area	33°43′11″S 19°00′09″E	A large late H-shaped house with a stoep right round it. Ornate front rococo gable. It has weak wingless scrolls at its base; the inner pilasters run up only as high as the head of the gable window, from which level they are linked with the edge mould b The farm was granted to Philippus Bemardus Wolfaart, who arrived at the Cape in the eighteenth century. At the end of 1791, when the Dutch East India Company offered many of its properties for sale in an attempt to pay off its debts, Wolfaart obtained a st. Media related to Nederburg at Wikimedia Commons
9/2/069/0019/001	Main House, Nederburg, Paarl District	Type of site: Farmhouse.		Paarl	Provincial Heritage Site	33°43′13″S 19°00′07″E	Type of site: Farmhouse. Media related to Nederburg at Wikimedia Commons
9/2/069/0020	132A Main Street, Paarl	Type of site: House Current use: Residential.	Paarl	Paarl	Provincial Heritage Site	33°46′37″S 18°57′26″E	Type of site: House Current use: Residential.
9/2/069/0021	Bethel Boys Hostel, Mill Street, Paarl	This imposing double-storied house, with its Victorian and Edwardian characteristics, dates from the second half of the eighteenth century. The front gable bears the date 1764.	Paarl	Paarl	Provincial Heritage Site	33°43′47″S 18°57′32″E	This imposing double-storied house, with its Victorian and Edwardian characteristics, dates from the second half of the eighteenth century. The front gable bears the date 1764. Media related to Bethel Boys Hostel at Wikimedia Commons
9/2/069/0022	Kleinbosch, Dal Josafat, Paarl		Paarl	Paarl	National Monument	33°41′30″S 19°01′29″E	Upload Photo
9/2/069/0022/001	Cemetery, Kleinbosch, Daljosafat, Paarl District	The farm Kleinbosch was granted in 1692 to Francois du Toit, the Huguenot ancestor of the Du Toit family in South Africa. It became a true family farm and in 1792 Guilliam du Toit built the present building on it. Type of site: Graveyard. This cemetery was laid out in about 1700 by the Huguenot ancestor, Francois du Toit, on his farm Kleinbosch. Three of the founders of the "Genootskap van Regte Afrikaners", namely the Rev. S. J. du Toit, D. F. du Toit and P. J. Malherbe, are also buried here.	Paarl	Paarl	Provincial Heritage Site	33°41′25″S 19°00′09″E	Upload Photo
9/2/069/0022/002	Homestead, Kleinbosch, Daljosafat, Paarl District	The farm Kleinbosch was granted to the Huguenot progenitor Francois du Toit. The H-shaped house was erected by his grandson, Guillaume. The date 1792 appears on the concavo-convex front gable. Type of site: Farmhouse Previous use: residential. Current use: House.		Paarl	Provincial Heritage Site	33°41′25″S 19°01′40″E	Upload Photo
9/2/069/0022/003	Hugenote Gedenkskool, Kleinbosch, Daljosafat, Paarl District	In 1881 the "Genootskap van Regte Afrikaners" decided to establish the Huguenot Memorial School. The building was erected in 1882-1883 and served as a school until 1910. It was originally a Georgian double storeyed building. Type of site: School.		Paarl	Provincial Heritage Site	33°41′22″S 19°01′36″E	In 1881 the "Genootskap van Regte Afrikaners" decided to establish the Huguenot Memorial School. The building was erected in 1882-1883 and served as a school until 1910. It was originally a Georgian double storeyed building. Type of site: School. Media related to Hugenote Gedenkskool at Wikimedia Commons
9/2/069/0022/004	Malherbehuis, Kleinbosch, Daljosafat, Paarl District	This Victorian house dates from the middle of the nineteenth century and was originally the dwelling of Petrus Jacobus Malherbe, founder member of the "Genootskap van Regte Afrikaners". Type of site: Farm House. This house was originally the dwelling of Petrus Jacobus Malherbe, founder member of the "Genootskap van Regte Afrikaners".		Paarl	Provincial Heritage Site	33°41′24″S 19°01′34″E	Upload Photo
9/2/069/0023	74 Main Street, Paarl	These properties form an integral part of the historical and architectural nucleus of Paarl. The houses on these erven, the majority of which date from the nineteenth century are representative of the Cape Dutch, Georgian. Victorian and Edwardian styles.	Paarl	Paarl	Provincial Heritage Site	33°45′11″S 18°57′42″E	These properties form an integral part of the historical and architectural nucleus of Paarl. The houses on these erven, the majority of which date from the nineteenth century are representative of the Cape Dutch, Georgian. Victorian and Edwardian styles.
9/2/069/0024	Windmill, Rhebokskloof, Paarl District		Paarl	Paarl	National Monument		Upload Photo
9/2/069/0025	Mooikelder Farm, Paarl District		Paarl	Paarl		33°41′10″S 18°56′58″E	Upload Photo
9/2/069/0026	Vergenoegd, 188 Main Street, Paarl	This building was erected between 1790 and 1800 and was the office of the Landdrost of Paarl. There is considerable difference of opinion on the early history of this building, due to the repeated sub division of properties.	Paarl	Paarl	Provincial Heritage Site	33°44′31″S 18°57′43″E	This building was erected between 1790 and 1800 and was the office of the Landdrost of Paarl. There is considerable difference of opinion on the early history of this building, due to the repeated sub division of properties.
9/2/069/0027	140 Main Street, Paarl	These properties form an integral part of the historical and architectural nucleus of Paarl. The houses on these erven, the majority of which date from the nineteenth century, are representative of the Cape Dutch, Georgian, Victorian and Edwardian building styles.	Paarl	Paarl	Provincial Heritage Site	33°44′49″S 18°57′44″E	These properties form an integral part of the historical and architectural nucleus of Paarl. The houses on these erven, the majority of which date from the nineteenth century, are representative of the Cape Dutch, Georgian, Victorian and Edwardian building styles.
9/2/069/0028	The Mountain Commonage, Paarlberg, Paarl	The huge, grey, granite bosses from which the Paarl Mountain derives its name had their origin some 550 million years ago as a molten mass, cooling gradually, deep under the surface of the earth. Millions of centuries passed and the overlying rocks were exposed. The area is proclaimed in order to ensure the preservation of its outstanding natural beauty.	Paarl	Paarl	Provincial Heritage Site	33°44′40″S 18°56′33″E	The huge, grey, granite bosses from which the Paarl Mountain derives its name had their origin some 550 million years ago as a molten mass, cooling gradually, deep under the surface of the earth. Millions of centuries passed and the overlying rocks were exposed. The area is proclaimed in order to ensure the preservation of its outstanding natural beauty.
9/2/069/0029	Fredericksburg, Drakenstein, Franschhoek District		Franschhoek	Paarl	National Monument		Upload Photo
9/2/069/0030	Boekenhoutskloof, Franschhoek, Paarl District		Franschhoek	Paarl		33°56′34″S 19°06′28″E	Upload Photo
9/2/069/0031	Laborie, Main Street, Paarl		Paarl	Paarl		33°45′55″S 18°57′28″E	
9/2/069/0031-001	Main House, Laborie, Main Street, Paarl	This historic manor house was erected before 1800, even though the front gable bears this date. It is an important example of the Cape Dutch architectural style. Type of site: Farmhouse.	Paarl	Paarl	Provincial Heritage Site	33°45′56″S 18°57′26″E	This historic manor house was erected before 1800, even though the front gable bears this date. It is an important example of the Cape Dutch architectural style. Type of site: Farmhouse. Media related to Laborie Main House at Wikimedia Commons
9/2/069/0031-002	Wine cellar, Laborie, Main Street, Paarl	This wine cellar dated from the early nineteenth century. Type of site: Wine Cellar.	Paarl	Paarl	Provincial Heritage Site	33°45′59″S 18°57′28″E	This wine cellar dated from the early nineteenth century. Type of site: Wine Cellar. Media related to Laborie Wine Cellar, Paarl at Wikimedia Commons
9/2/069/0032	419 Main Street, Paarl	A rectangular house of double depth of 1832, its roof now of iron and with clipped ends, and loft-windows. The outside woodwork, including an 8-panelled front door, is intact, and there is an outside chimney.	Paarl	Paarl	Provincial Heritage Site	33°43′29″S 18°57′49″E	Upload Photo
9/2/069/0033	96 Main Street, Paarl		Paarl	Paarl	National Monument	33°44′59″S 18°57′43″E	Upload Photo
9/2/069/0034	98 Main Street, Paarl	Almost identical to no 96, but with a shallower plan; it is probably an older house, altered to match its neighbour. These properties form an integral part of the historical and architectural nucleus of Paarl. The houses on these erven, the majority of which date from the nineteenth century are representative of the Cape Dutch, Georgian, Victorian and Edwardian styles.	Paarl	Paarl	Provincial Heritage Site	33°44′58″S 18°57′42″E	Almost identical to no 96, but with a shallower plan; it is probably an older house, altered to match its neighbour. These properties form an integral part of the historical and architectural nucleus of Paarl. The houses on these erven, the majority of which date from the nineteenth century are representative of the Cape Dutch, Georgian, Victorian and Edwardian styles.
9/2/069/0035	Burgundy, Franschhoek, Paarl District	Pierre de Villiers, eldest of the three brothers who had moved Franschhoek in 1694 after their farming efforts at Paarl had proved unsuccessful. The youngest, Jacques, settled at La Bri, Abraham at Champagne and Pierre at Burgundy. Type of site: Farm Complex.	Franschhoek	Paarl	Provincial Heritage Site	33°55′46″S 19°06′40″E	Upload Photo
9/2/069/0036	Swiss Farm Excelsior, Paarl District		Paarl	Paarl	National Monument		Upload Photo
9/2/069/0037	103-107 Main Street, Paarl	An elongated Plan building from c1850 with iron roof and loft-windows. These properties form an integral part of the historical and architectural nucleus of Paarl. The houses on these erven, the majority of which date from the nineteenth century are representative of the Cape Dutch, Georgian, Victorian and Edwardian styles.	Paarl	Paarl	Provincial Heritage Site	33°46′37″S 18°57′26″E	An elongated Plan building from c1850 with iron roof and loft-windows. These properties form an integral part of the historical and architectural nucleus of Paarl. The houses on these erven, the majority of which date from the nineteenth century are representative of the Cape Dutch, Georgian, Victorian and Edwardian styles.
9/2/069/0038	427 Main Street, Paarl		Paarl	Paarl	National Monument	33°43′27″S 18°57′51″E	Upload Photo
9/2/069/0039	Lemoenkloof Guest House, 394 and 396A Main Street, Paarl		Paarl	Paarl	Provincial Heritage Site	33°43′23″S 18°57′46″E	
9/2/069/0040	Patriot Building, 223-227 Main Street, Paarl		Paarl	Paarl	National Monument	33°44′29″S 18°57′46″E	Upload Photo
9/2/069/0041	Boschendal, Groot Drakenstein, Paarl District	This farm was originally granted to the Huguenot Jean le Long in 1685, Afterwards the property became the home of Jacques de Villiers and his wife Marguerite Gardiol. Their grandson, Paul, built the historic manor house in 1812. Type of site: Farm Complex.		Paarl	Provincial Heritage Site	33°52′39″S 18°58′25″E	This farm was originally granted to the Huguenot Jean le Long in 1685, Afterwards the property became the home of Jacques de Villiers and his wife Marguerite Gardiol. Their grandson, Paul, built the historic manor house in 1812. Type of site: Farm Complex. Media related to Boschendal at Wikimedia Commons
9/2/069/0042	L'Ormarins, Groot Drakenstein, Paarl District		Paarl	Paarl	National Monument	33°52′20″S 18°59′56″E	Upload Photo
9/2/069/0043	37 Berg Street, Franschhoek, Paarl District		Franschhoek	Paarl		33°54′48″S 19°07′12″E	Upload Photo
9/2/069/0044	Dutch Reformed Church, Franschhoek, Paarl District	This church, with its neo-Gothic and Cape-Dutch architectural features, was built at the instance of the Rev. P. N. Ham, shortly after the local congregation had broken away, in 1845, from the Paarl congregation. Type of site: Church Current use: Church : Dutch Reformed.	Franschhoek	Paarl	Provincial Heritage Site	33°54′34″S 19°07′09″E	This church, with its neo-Gothic and Cape-Dutch architectural features, was built at the instance of the Rev. P. N. Ham, shortly after the local congregation had broken away, in 1845, from the Paarl congregation. Type of site: Church Current use: Church : Dutch Reformed. Media related to Dutch Reformed Church, Franschhoek at Wikimedia Commons
9/2/069/0045	La Rochelle Hostel, Academy Street, Franschhoek, Paarl District		Franschhoek	Paarl	National Monument	33°54′37″S 19°07′19″E	Upload Photo
9/2/069/0046	Bellingham Homestead, Groot Drakenstein, Paarl District	The Bellinchamp Homestead, an imposing Cape Dutch house dating from the seventeenth century that is surrounded by beautifully landscaped gardens and bordered by a ring-wall, together with the outbuildings within the ring-wall which date from the eighteenth century. Also known as Bellegam. Dates to 1695, when granted to a Van Vuuren (Burman J, Waters of the Western Cape) Portion 2 of the farm Bellingham No. 1022 consists of an area of land measuring 2,5753 hectares with the main farmhouse and several outbuildings. Type of site: Farmhouse.		Paarl	Provincial Heritage Site	33°52′57″S 19°01′15″E	Upload Photo
9/2/069/0047	Pontac, Zion Street, Paarl	In 1723 the property Pontak, just over 2 morgen in size, was granted to Jan Labuschagne (whether his ancestors had come from Pontaix in Dauphine is not certain; the name suggests it). The homestead still stands, at the head of Pontak St. Type of site: Farmstead.	Paarl	Paarl	Provisional Protection	33°44′29″S 18°57′35″E	Upload Photo
9/2/069/0048	Meerlust, Paarl		Paarl	Paarl	Provincial Monument	34°01′01″S 18°45′26″E	Upload Photo
9/2/069/0049	13 Parsonage Street, Paarl		Paarl	Paarl		33°44′02″S 18°57′49″E	Upload Photo
9/2/069/0050	Keerweder, Franschhoek, Paarl district		Paarl	Paarl	Pending Register		Upload Photo
9/2/069/0051	1 Theron Street, Paarl		Paarl	Paarl		33°44′44″S 18°57′40″E	Upload Photo
9/2/069/0052	Vlakkeland, Daljosafat, Paarl District	This Cape-Dutch complex, as well as the surrounding ring wall, presumably dates from the years 1790-1800 and was previously the farmstead of the farm Vlakkeland which was granted to Jean Roux, a Huguenot, in 1694. Type of site: Farm Complex.		Paarl	Provincial Heritage Site	33°41′12″S 18°59′43″E	Upload Photo
9/2/069/0053	Schoongezicht, Daljosafat, Paarl District	This H-shaped Cape-Dutch house has impressive gables, windows and casements as well as a beautiful interior. This property was granted in 1694 to Abraham Vivier and was sold in 1723 to Francois du Toit. The original part of the house was erected about 1770, while the front gable dates back to 1826. This H-shaped Cape-Dutch house has impressive gables, windows an Type of site: Farmstead.		Paarl	Provincial Heritage Site	33°41′47″S 19°00′43″E	Upload Photo
9/2/069/0054	511 Main Street, Paarl		Paarl	Paarl	National Monument	33°42′52″S 18°57′48″E	Upload Photo
9/2/069/0055	15 Plein Street, Paarl		Paarl	Paarl		33°43′36″S 18°57′38″E	Upload Photo
9/2/069/0056	Plaisir de Merle, Simodium, Paarl District		Paarl	Paarl		33°50′03″S 18°57′16″E	Upload Photo
9/2/069/0057	3 Zeederberg Street, Paarl	This dwelling with its cast-iron decorated verandah and portico, the original section of which dates from the 1830s, was Victorianised in 1890. The property together with the two adjacent buildings that have already been declared forms a unique architect	Paarl	Paarl	Provincial Heritage Site	33°44′41″S 18°57′40″E	Upload Photo
9/2/069/0058	5 Dirkie Uys Street, Franschhoek, Paarl District		Franschhoek	Paarl	National Monument	33°54′47″S 19°07′23″E	Upload Photo
9/2/069/0059	Rhone, Groot Drakenstein, Paarl District	The original grant of this farm, made in 1691, was to a Huguenot, Jean Gardé. From 1702 to 1902, however, the farm saw a succession of, different owners; with the result that it has close historical ties with families such as the Malans, Jordaans and Hau Type of site: Farm Complex.		Paarl	Provincial Heritage Site	33°53′10″S 18°58′09″E	The original grant of this farm, made in 1691, was to a Huguenot, Jean Gardé. From 1702 to 1902, however, the farm saw a succession of, different owners; with the result that it has close historical ties with families such as the Malans, Jordaans and Hau Type of site: Farm Complex. Media related to Rhone (Franschhoek) at Wikimedia Commons
9/2/069/0060	Les Chenes, Paarl District		Franschhoek	Paarl	National Monument		Upload Photo
9/2/069/0061	Cabriere, Klip Street, Franschhoek, Paarl District		Franschhoek	Paarl			Upload Photo
9/2/069/0062	Rozenburg House, 2 Rozenburg Street, Paarl	This dwelling with its Georgian and Victorian characteristics was rebuilt during the 1850s to its present form. This property also forms an integral part of the historical core of Paarl.	Paarl	Paarl	Provincial Heritage Site	34°45′05″S 18°57′48″E	This dwelling with its Georgian and Victorian characteristics was rebuilt during the 1850s to its present form. This property also forms an integral part of the historical core of Paarl.
9/2/069/0063	66 Huguenot Street, Franschhoek		Franschhoek	Paarl	National Monument	33°54′30″S 19°07′03″E	Upload Photo
9/2/069/0064	Klein Cabriere, Cabriere Street, Franschhoek		Franschhoek	Paarl		33°54′40″S 19°06′59″E	Upload Photo
9/2/069/0065	44-50 Huguenot Street, Franschhoek		Franschhoek	Paarl		33°54′37″S 19°07′08″E	Upload Photo
9/2/069/0066	Zomerlust, 193 Main Street, Paarl		Paarl	Paarl		33°44′34″S 18°57′48″E	Upload Photo
9/2/069/0067	Goede Hoop, Groot Drakenstein, Paarl District		Paarl	Paarl			Upload Photo
9/2/069/0068	78 and 80 Main Street, Paarl	These properties form an integral part of the historical and architectural nucleus of Paarl. The houses on these erven, the majority of which date from the nineteenth century are representative of the Cape Dutch, Georgian. Victorian and Edwardian styles.	Paarl	Paarl	Provincial Heritage Site	33°45′09″S 18°57′42″E	These properties form an integral part of the historical and architectural nucleus of Paarl. The houses on these erven, the majority of which date from the nineteenth century are representative of the Cape Dutch, Georgian. Victorian and Edwardian styles.
9/2/069/0069	Dutch Reformed Church, Main Street, Paarl	This historic cruciform church with its "strooidak" or thatched roof stands in High Street, Suider Paarl. It is the church of the third oldest Dutch Reformed congregation in South Africa, the congregation of Paarl, formerly known as Drakenstein. This cong Type of site: Church Current use: Church : Dutch Reformed. The Strooidakkerk, Paarl, was consecrated in 1805 and is one of the oldest Dutch Reformed Church buildings, still in use, in the Republic. It has a great tradition and its architectural merit is considerable.	Paarl	Paarl	Provincial Heritage Site	33°44′45″S 18°57′46″E	This historic cruciform church with its "strooidak" or thatched roof stands in High Street, Suider Paarl. It is the church of the third oldest Dutch Reformed congregation in South Africa, the congregation of Paarl, formerly known as Drakenstein. This cong Type of site: Church Current use: Church : Dutch Reformed. The Strooidakkerk, Paarl, was consecrated in 1805 and is one of the oldest Dutch Reformed Church buildings, still in use, in the Republic. It has a great tradition and its architectural merit is considerable. Media related to Strooidakkerk, Paarl at Wikimedia Commons
9/2/069/0069/01	Grave of DS Marais, Strooidakkerk Cemetery, Paarl		Paarl	Paarl	National Monument		Upload Photo
9/2/069/0070	La Terra De Luc, Paarl District		Paarl	Paarl		33°53′57″S 19°06′16″E	Upload Photo
9/2/069/0071	Old Parsonage Museum, Main Street, Paarl	Simon van der Stel's "Colony of Drakenstein" quickly developed along the Berg River Valley. On both sides of the road that runs down the valley from Fransch hoek through Simondium to Paarl and Wellington, there are farms and fine old Cape Dutch houses. Type of site: Parsonage Previous use: House. Current use: Museum.	Paarl	Paarl	Provincial Heritage Site	33°43′57″S 18°57′51″E	Simon van der Stel's "Colony of Drakenstein" quickly developed along the Berg River Valley. On both sides of the road that runs down the valley from Fransch hoek through Simondium to Paarl and Wellington, there are farms and fine old Cape Dutch houses. Type of site: Parsonage Previous use: House. Current use: Museum.
9/2/069/0072	Jan Joubertsgat Bridge, Franschhoek Pass, Paarl District	The first farms in Franschhoek, then still known as "Olifantshoek", were granted to the French Huguenots in 1688. The surrounding mountains entirely cut off the picturesque valley from the interior to the east. Type of site: Bridge Current use: Bridge.	Franschhoek	Paarl	Provincial Heritage Site	33°56′18″S 19°09′41″E	The first farms in Franschhoek, then still known as "Olifantshoek", were granted to the French Huguenots in 1688. The surrounding mountains entirely cut off the picturesque valley from the interior to the east. Type of site: Bridge Current use: Bridge. Media related to Jan Joubertsgat Bridge at Wikimedia Commons
9/2/069/0073	Gymnasium Primary School, Gymnasium Street, Paarl	The original building of the Gymnasium school was opened on 12 January 1858. The school played a leading part in the struggle for the retention of the Dutch language and also in the Afrikaans Language-movement. The old Gymnasium School is situated on the Type of site: School Current use: Primary school. The original building of the Gymnasium school was opened on 12 January 1858. The school played a leading part in the struggle for the retention of the Dutch language and also in the Afrikaans Language-movement.	Paarl	Paarl	Provincial Heritage Site	33°43′58″S 18°57′44″E	The original building of the Gymnasium school was opened on 12 January 1858. The school played a leading part in the struggle for the retention of the Dutch language and also in the Afrikaans Language-movement. The old Gymnasium School is situated on the Type of site: School Current use: Primary school. The original building of the Gymnasium school was opened on 12 January 1858. The school played a leading part in the struggle for the retention of the Dutch language and also in the Afrikaans Language-movement.
9/2/069/0074	Printing Press of Genootskap van Regte Afrikaners, Huguenot Museum, Paarl	Some of the most valuable objects in the Huguenot Museum in Paarl are the small printing press, the proof press and the book-binding apparatus used by the "Genootskap van Regte Afrikaners This society was founded on 14 August 1875, in "Wesfalen", the h. The printing press contributed much to the effectiveness of the Genootskap van Regte Afrikaners which played an important part in the history of the Afrikaans language.	Paarl	Paarl	Heritage Object	33°43′42″S 18°59′11″E	Upload Photo
9/2/069/0075	Het Gesticht Mission Church, 122 Main Street, Paarl	It is rectangular in plan, its narrow end towards street topped by a good pediment over the full width. The door is 8-panelled and has an upper light with good 'gothic' tracery and hood mould. In front stands a well-proportioned belltower matching the pe This building was erected in 1813 to serve as an "oefeningshuis" for religious instruction, catechism classes and prayer meetings for peoples of colour. It is the fourth oldest church building in South Africa. In 1819 it was transferred to the 'Paarlsche Type of site: Church Previous use: Church. This building was erected in 1813 to serve as an "oefeningshuis" for religious instruction, catechism classes and prayer meetings for non-White. It is the fourth oldest church building in South Africa.	Paarl	Paarl	Provincial Heritage Site	33°44′53″S 18°57′42″E	It is rectangular in plan, its narrow end towards street topped by a good pediment over the full width. The door is 8-panelled and has an upper light with good 'gothic' tracery and hood mould. In front stands a well-proportioned belltower matching the pe This building was erected in 1813 to serve as an "oefeningshuis" for religious instruction, catechism classes and prayer meetings for peoples of colour. It is the fourth oldest church building in South Africa. In 1819 it was transferred to the 'Paarlsche Type of site: Church Previous use: Church. This building was erected in 1813 to serve as an "oefeningshuis" for religious instruction, catechism classes and prayer meetings for non-White. It is the fourth oldest church building in South Africa.
9/2/069/0076	La Provence, Franschhoek, Paarl District	Granted in 1694 to Pierre Joubert (Burman J, Waters of the Western Cape) This imposing house was probably built by Pieter de Villiers who bought the farm in 1756. The building is H-shaped with beautiful gables bearing the dates 1800 and 1815, respectively Type of site: Farm Complex. This imposing house, one of the best-known Cape- Dutch houses, was probably built by Pieter de Villiers who bought the farm in 1756. The building is H-shaped with beautiful gables bearing the dates 1800 and 1815, respectively.	Frannschoek	Paarl	Provincial Heritage Site	33°53′37″S 19°05′30″E	Granted in 1694 to Pierre Joubert (Burman J, Waters of the Western Cape) This imposing house was probably built by Pieter de Villiers who bought the farm in 1756. The building is H-shaped with beautiful gables bearing the dates 1800 and 1815, respectively Type of site: Farm Complex. This imposing house, one of the best-known Cape- Dutch houses, was probably built by Pieter de Villiers who bought the farm in 1756. The building is H-shaped with beautiful gables bearing the dates 1800 and 1815, respectively. Media related to Grande Provence, Franschhoek at Wikimedia Commons
9/2/069/0077	La Motte, Franschhoek, Paarl District	In 1815 the remainder was acquired by Gideon Jacobus Joubert and as the next transfer is dated 1858, this man must have built the wine cellar, or added a centre gable to it, dated 1825. He also added a very similar gable to the house in 1836 (which bears Settled in 1695 by a German, Hans Hendrik Hattingh (Burman J, Waters of the Western Cape) In 1695 the land was granted to a German named Hans Hendrik Hattingh. In 1709, he sold the land to Pierre Joubert, a Huguenot who arrived at the Cape in 1688 with Type of site: Farm Complex. The outstanding La Motte manor house, which was probably during the fifties of the eighteenth century by Gabriel du Toit, is a T-shaped building with a concavo-convex middle gable and attractive facade. The manor house, together with the "jonkmanshuis", t	Franschhoek	Paarl	Provincial Heritage Site	33°52′49″S 19°04′25″E	In 1815 the remainder was acquired by Gideon Jacobus Joubert and as the next transfer is dated 1858, this man must have built the wine cellar, or added a centre gable to it, dated 1825. He also added a very similar gable to the house in 1836 (which bears Settled in 1695 by a German, Hans Hendrik Hattingh (Burman J, Waters of the Western Cape) In 1695 the land was granted to a German named Hans Hendrik Hattingh. In 1709, he sold the land to Pierre Joubert, a Huguenot who arrived at the Cape in 1688 with Type of site: Farm Complex. The outstanding La Motte manor house, which was probably during the fifties of the eighteenth century by Gabriel du Toit, is a T-shaped building with a concavo-convex middle gable and attractive facade. The manor house, together with the "jonkmanshuis", t Media related to La Motte, Franschhoek at Wikimedia Commons
9/2/069/0077/1	La Motte cemetery, Paarl District		Paarl	Paarl	Plaque		Upload Photo
9/2/069/0078	Bergskadus, Klein Drakenstein, Paarl District	This historic Cape Dutch manor house was probably built in 1823 by Joshua Malherbe and has remained basically unaltered. Type of site: Farm Complex.		Paarl	Provincial Heritage Site	33°43′27″S 18°57′21″E	Upload Photo
9/2/069/0079	Rozenfontein, 113 Main Street, Paarl	A rectangular, deep house, now with hipped iron roof and veranda with loft-windows. The facade woodwork has an 8-panelled door with rectangular fanlight consisting of intersecting segments, and flanking sash windows with internal shutters; there are French. This Georgian house, which dates from the fifties of the 18th century, forms an essential part of the character of Main Street, as well as of Paarl itself.	Paarl	Paarl	Provincial Heritage Site	33°45′16″S 18°57′45″E	A rectangular, deep house, now with hipped iron roof and veranda with loft-windows. The facade woodwork has an 8-panelled door with rectangular fanlight consisting of intersecting segments, and flanking sash windows with internal shutters; there are French. This Georgian house, which dates from the fifties of the 18th century, forms an essential part of the character of Main Street, as well as of Paarl itself.
9/2/069/0080	7 De Jongh Avenue, Paarl	This H-shaped Cape Dutch house was erected in 1818 by Pieter Roux. Together with the other buildings in De Jongh Avenue, the house forms an important historical and architectural group. Together with the other buildings in De Jongh Avenue, the house forms an important historical and architectural group.	Paarl	Paarl	Provincial Heritage Site	33°43′27″S 18°57′21″E	Upload Photo
9/2/069/0081	Mijn Hoop Vervuld, 10 De Jongh Avenue, Paarl	This H-shaped Cape Dutch house with its six gables was probably erected in 1801 by Abraham de Clercq. The property forms an integral part of the historical core of Paarl. No. 10, De Jongh Laan, stands next to the churchyard, with, on its West side, what i.	Paarl	Paarl	Provincial Heritage Site	33°43′27″S 18°57′21″E	Upload Photo
9/2/069/0082	Klein Vredenburg, 155 Main Street, Paarl	The dwelling-house is a typical Georgian double-storeyed town house which, in its present form, dates from about the middle of the nineteenth century. The group of buildings forms an integral part of the historic core of Paarl.	Paarl	Paarl	Provincial Heritage Site	33°44′53″S 18°57′45″E	The dwelling-house is a typical Georgian double-storeyed town house which, in its present form, dates from about the middle of the nineteenth century. The group of buildings forms an integral part of the historic core of Paarl.
9/2/069/0083	94 Mill Street, Paarl	Current use: Dwelling. The original portion of this house was initially in the Cape Dutch style and dates from the beginning of the nineteenth century. The building was later Victorianised by subsequent owners.	Paarl	Paarl	Provincial Heritage Site	33°43′39″S 18°57′31″E	Upload Photo
9/2/069/0084	60-62 Mill Street, Paarl	This double-storeyed building is predominantly in the Georgian style, although it also possesses Victorian characteristics. It dates from about 1803 and forms an integral part of the historic facade of Mill Street.	Paarl	Paarl	Provincial Heritage Site	33°43′49″S 18°57′30″E	Upload Photo
9/2/069/0085	Amstelhof, Daljosafat, Paarl District	The house is H-shaped and has a square, pedimented front gable dated 1856, bearing some illegible initials which are probably those of Jacobus Petrus Theron, owner from 1843 to 1890. The house is without doubt older. This can be determined as the back fl This Cape Dutch house in its present form dates from the second half of the 19th century, as is evident inter alia from the date (1856) on the front gable, the plain style of the gable and Victorian influences. In 1694 the 60 morgen farm was granted to Da Type of site: Farmstead.		Paarl	Provincial Heritage Site	33°44′42″S 19°00′58″E	Upload Photo
9/2/069/0086	Eikenhof, Van der Poels Avenue, Paarl	This late Victorian house was erected in 1900 as a mansion for wagonmaker Stark.	Paarl	Paarl	Provincial Heritage Site	33°43′35″S 18°57′44″E	Upload Photo
9/2/069/0087	9 De Jongh Avenue, Paarl	This imposing Cape-Dutch dwelling-house with its thatched roof and symmetric facade presumably dates from the 1850s.	Paarl	Paarl	Provincial Heritage Site	33°44′48″S 18°57′48″E	Upload Photo
9/2/069/0088	La Vieille Cure, 43 Huguenot Street, Franschhoek	This property previously formed part of the farm La Cotte, which was originally granted to the French Huguenot Jean Gardiol in 1713. The dwelling-house with its predominantly Cape Dutch features were presumably erected before 1850.	Franschhoek	Paarl	Provincial Heritage Site	33°54′22″S 19°07′01″E	Upload Photo
9/2/069/0089	4 and 5 Zeederberg Square, Paarl	This double storeyed semi-detached complex, with its Georgian and Victorian features, dates from the years 1890-1900. The property forms and integral part of the historic core of Paarl.	Paarl	Paarl	Provincial Heritage Site	33°44′41″S 18°57′41″E	This double storeyed semi-detached complex, with its Georgian and Victorian features, dates from the years 1890-1900. The property forms and integral part of the historic core of Paarl.
9/2/069/0090	Toringkerk and vaults, Main Street, Paarl	This imposing church building with its 57 metre high tower was designed by the architect firm Sherwood, Pitts and Wood and erected during the years 1904 to 1907 by the builders De Villiers, Larson and Co. The cornerstone was laid on 8 April 1905 by Dr. An Type of site: Church, Museum Current use: Church : Dutch Reformed.	Paarl	Paarl	Provincial Heritage Site	33°43′58″S 18°57′47″E	This imposing church building with its 57 metre high tower was designed by the architect firm Sherwood, Pitts and Wood and erected during the years 1904 to 1907 by the builders De Villiers, Larson and Co. The cornerstone was laid on 8 April 1905 by Dr. An Type of site: Church, Museum Current use: Church : Dutch Reformed. Media related to Toringkerk, Paarl at Wikimedia Commons
9/2/069/0091	127 Main Street, Paarl	An L-shaped house, now under: iron roof, with loft-windows and veranda. Its clipped front gable is dated 1837, and 2 sashes in front date from that time. The front door and outer French windows are late 19th century. This Victorian dwelling-house, of which the front gable bears the date 1837, forms an integral part of the historic and architectural character of Main Street, Paarl.	Paarl	Paarl	Provincial Heritage Site	33°45′08″S 18°57′44″E	An L-shaped house, now under: iron roof, with loft-windows and veranda. Its clipped front gable is dated 1837, and 2 sashes in front date from that time. The front door and outer French windows are late 19th century. This Victorian dwelling-house, of which the front gable bears the date 1837, forms an integral part of the historic and architectural character of Main Street, Paarl.
9/2/069/0092	Stadtzicht, 19 Victoria Street, Paarl	A single-storeyed late-Victorian villa with a wooden fretwork veranda and entrance porch. The veranda is wrapped round the corner turret, left, and on the right runs dead into a 3-bay 'stoepkamer'. This late-Victorian manor-house was erected at the turn of the nineteenth century.	Paarl	Paarl	Provincial Heritage Site	33°44′00″S 18°57′30″E	Upload Photo
9/2/069/0093	2 Zeederberg Square, Paarl	A rectangular house, 2 rooms deep, with iron roof, loft-windows and a later veranda. The windows are late 19th century. This dwelling-house, originally erected in the Cape Dutch style, was victorianised in the 1890s. The property forms an integral part of the historical core of Paarl. This dwelling-house, originally erected in the Cape Dutch style, was victorianised in the 1890s. The property forms an integral part of the historical core of Paarl.	Paarl	Paarl	Provincial Heritage Site	33°44′40″S 18°57′41″E	Upload Photo
9/2/069/0094	De Kleine Konstantie, Constantia Street, Paarl	This Cape Dutch house, with its impressive front gable bearing the date 1841, was originally the homestead of the farm 1 Kleine Konstantie, which was granted to Johannes Philippus Minnaar on 1 July 1817 by Lord Charles Somerset. This farm; which was owned.	Paarl	Paarl	Provincial Heritage Site	33°45′05″S 18°57′33″E	This Cape Dutch house, with its impressive front gable bearing the date 1841, was originally the homestead of the farm 1 Kleine Konstantie, which was granted to Johannes Philippus Minnaar on 1 July 1817 by Lord Charles Somerset. This farm; which was owned.
9/2/069/0095	Divisional Council Building, 194 Main Street, Paarl	This impressive public building with its neoclassical elements forms an integral part of the architectural character of Main Street, Paarl, where the Cape Dutch, Georgian, Victorian and Edwardian building styles blend harmoniously.	Paarl	Paarl	Provincial Heritage Site	33°44′30″S 18°57′45″E	Upload Photo
9/2/069/0096	70 Main Street, Paarl	Victorian corner house with splayed corner, veranda, loft-windows and louvred woodwork. These properties form an integral part of the historical and architectural nucleus of Paarl. The houses on these erven, the majority of which date from the nineteenth century are representative of the Cape Dutch, Georgian. Victorian and Edwardian styles o	Paarl	Paarl	Provincial Heritage Site	33°55′17″S 18°25′19″E	Victorian corner house with splayed corner, veranda, loft-windows and louvred woodwork. These properties form an integral part of the historical and architectural nucleus of Paarl. The houses on these erven, the majority of which date from the nineteenth century are representative of the Cape Dutch, Georgian. Victorian and Edwardian styles o
9/2/069/0097	72 Main Street, Paarl	These properties form an integral part of the historical and architectural nucleus of Paarl. The houses on these erven, the majority of which date from the nineteenth century are representative of the Cape Dutch, Georgian. Victorian and Edwardian styles o	Paarl	Paarl	Provincial Heritage Site	33°55′17″S 18°25′19″E	These properties form an integral part of the historical and architectural nucleus of Paarl. The houses on these erven, the majority of which date from the nineteenth century are representative of the Cape Dutch, Georgian. Victorian and Edwardian styles o
9/2/069/0098	189 & 191 Main Street, Paarl		Paarl	Paarl	National Monument	33°44′36″S 18°57′44″E	Upload Photo
9/2/069/0099	92 Main Street, Paarl	These properties form an integral part of the historical and architectural nucleus of Paarl. The houses on these erven, the majority of which date from the nineteenth century are representative of the Cape Dutch, Georgian. Victorian and Edwardian styles o	Paarl	Paarl	Provincial Heritage Site	33°45′00″S 18°57′41″E	These properties form an integral part of the historical and architectural nucleus of Paarl. The houses on these erven, the majority of which date from the nineteenth century are representative of the Cape Dutch, Georgian. Victorian and Edwardian styles o
9/2/069/0100	106 Main Street, Paarl	These properties form an integral part of the historical and architectural nucleus of Paarl. The houses on these erven, the majority of which date from the nineteenth century are representative of the Cape Dutch, Georgian. Victorian and Edwardian styles o	Paarl	Paarl	Provincial Heritage Site	33°44′56″S 18°57′42″E	Upload Photo
9/2/069/0101	146 and 148 Main Street, Paarl	These properties form an integral part of the historical and architectural nucleus of Paarl. The houses on these erven, the majority of which date from the nineteenth century are representative of the Cape Dutch, Georgian. Victorian and Edwardian styles o	Paarl	Paarl	Provincial Heritage Site	33°44′44″S 18°57′44″E	These properties form an integral part of the historical and architectural nucleus of Paarl. The houses on these erven, the majority of which date from the nineteenth century are representative of the Cape Dutch, Georgian. Victorian and Edwardian styles o
9/2/069/0102	Outspan, 150 and 152 Main Street, Paarl	Type of site: Outspan. These properties form an integral part of the historical and architectural nucleus of Paarl. The houses on these erven, the majority of which date from the nineteenth century are representative of the Cape Dutch, Georgian. Victorian and Edwardian styles o	Paarl	Paarl	Provincial Heritage Site	33°44′42″S 18°57′43″E	Type of site: Outspan. These properties form an integral part of the historical and architectural nucleus of Paarl. The houses on these erven, the majority of which date from the nineteenth century are representative of the Cape Dutch, Georgian. Victorian and Edwardian styles o
9/2/069/0103	172 and 174 Main Street, Paarl	A double-storeyed house, partly altered, but retaining woodwork dating from c1830, including 2 fine 8-panelled doors with garlanded spoke-fanlights contained within rectangles. These properties form an integral part of the historical and architectural nucleus of Paarl. The houses on these erven, the majority of which date from the nineteenth century, are representative of the Cape Dutch, Georgian, Victorian and Edwardian building	Paarl	Paarl	Provincial Heritage Site	33°43′01″S 18°57′46″E	A double-storeyed house, partly altered, but retaining woodwork dating from c1830, including 2 fine 8-panelled doors with garlanded spoke-fanlights contained within rectangles. These properties form an integral part of the historical and architectural nucleus of Paarl. The houses on these erven, the majority of which date from the nineteenth century, are representative of the Cape Dutch, Georgian, Victorian and Edwardian building
9/2/069/0104	Vergenoegd, 186 Main Street, Paarl	These properties form an integral part of the historical and architectural nucleus of Paarl. The houses on these erven, the majority of which date from the nineteenth century, are representative of the Cape Dutch, Georgian, Victorian and Edwardian building	Paarl	Paarl	Provincial Heritage Site	33°42′52″S 18°57′47″E	Upload Photo
9/2/069/0105	De Oude Woning, 214 Main Street, Paarl	The gable is an early florid example: 1784, unornamented except for a fan and the date set on a ribbon. The house is H-shaped, with a similar but plainer gable at the back: it contains yellowwood doors which have been very well cared for, and, in the kitchen a reminder of the gabled houses which once lined Paarl streets. These properties form an integral part of the historical and architectural nucleus of Paarl. The houses on these erven, the majority of which date from the nineteenth century, are representative of the Georgian and the Victorian building styles.	Paarl	Paarl	Provincial Heritage Site	33°44′26″S 18°57′44″E	The gable is an early florid example: 1784, unornamented except for a fan and the date set on a ribbon. The house is H-shaped, with a similar but plainer gable at the back: it contains yellowwood doors which have been very well cared for, and, in the kitchen a reminder of the gabled houses which once lined Paarl streets. These properties form an integral part of the historical and architectural nucleus of Paarl. The houses on these erven, the majority of which date from the nineteenth century, are representative of the Georgian and the Victorian building styles.
9/2/069/0106	388 and 390 Main Street, Paarl	These properties form an integral part of the historical and architectural nucleus of Paarl. The houses on these erven, the majority of which date from the nineteenth century. are representative of the Georgian and the Victorian building styles.	Paarl	Paarl	Provincial Heritage Site	33°43′28″S 18°57′47″E	Upload Photo
9/2/069/0107	Hillside, 44 Mill Street, Paarl	A single-storeyed late-Victorian house, c1895, its projecting section on the right built up to 2 storeys with a balcony. There is a wooden fretwork veranda. These properties form an integral part of the historical and architectural nucleus of Paarl. The houses on these erven, the majority of which date from the nineteenth century are representative of the Cape Dutch, Georgian. Victorian and Edwardian styles o	Paarl	Paarl	Provincial Heritage Site	33°43′55″S 18°57′34″E	A single-storeyed late-Victorian house, c1895, its projecting section on the right built up to 2 storeys with a balcony. There is a wooden fretwork veranda. These properties form an integral part of the historical and architectural nucleus of Paarl. The houses on these erven, the majority of which date from the nineteenth century are representative of the Cape Dutch, Georgian. Victorian and Edwardian styles o
9/2/069/0108	27 and 29 Orange Street, Paarl	These properties form an integral part of the historical and architectural nucleus of Paarl. The houses on these erven, the majority of which date from the nineteenth century are representative of the Cape Dutch, Georgian. Victorian and Edwardian styles.	Paarl	Paarl	Provincial Heritage Site	33°44′09″S 18°57′38″E	Upload Photo
9/2/069/0109	2 Patriot Street, Paarl	This impressive dwelling-house which was erected in 1905 by Wilhelm Bruckner de Villiers in the late-Victorian style, not only forms an essential part of the traditional architectural street scene of Patriot Street, but also an integral part of the history.	Paarl	Paarl	Provincial Heritage Site	33°44′29″S 18°57′49″E	Upload Photo
9/2/069/0110	91 Main Street, Paarl	These properties form an integral part of the historical and architectural nucleus of Paarl. The houses on these erven, the majority of which date from the nineteenth century are representative of the Cape Dutch, Georgian. Victorian and Edwardian styles	Paarl	Paarl	Provincial Heritage Site	33°45′22″S 18°57′46″E	These properties form an integral part of the historical and architectural nucleus of Paarl. The houses on these erven, the majority of which date from the nineteenth century are representative of the Cape Dutch, Georgian. Victorian and Edwardian styles
9/2/069/0111	95 Main Street, Paarl	A rectangular, 2-rooms deep house with an iron roof. The end-gables are clipped, but there is a square and pedimented front gable dating from c1850. The facade woodwork is modern. These properties form an integral part of the historical and architectural nucleus of Paarl. The houses on these erven, the majority of which date from the nineteenth century are representative of the Cape Dutch, Georgian. Victorian and Edwardian styles	Paarl	Paarl	Provincial Heritage Site	33°45′22″S 18°57′46″E	A rectangular, 2-rooms deep house with an iron roof. The end-gables are clipped, but there is a square and pedimented front gable dating from c1850. The facade woodwork is modern. These properties form an integral part of the historical and architectural nucleus of Paarl. The houses on these erven, the majority of which date from the nineteenth century are representative of the Cape Dutch, Georgian. Victorian and Edwardian styles
9/2/069/0112	133 and 135 Main Street, Paarl	Rectangular house, now with iron roof and loft-windows. The front door is 8-panelled and with spoke-fanlight. These three properties with their Victorian buildings are not only typical of the architectural tradition which gives Main Street its character, but are in themselves also an integral component of the historical core of Paarl.	Paarl	Paarl	Provincial Heritage Site	33°45′06″S 18°57′44″E	Rectangular house, now with iron roof and loft-windows. The front door is 8-panelled and with spoke-fanlight. These three properties with their Victorian buildings are not only typical of the architectural tradition which gives Main Street its character, but are in themselves also an integral component of the historical core of Paarl.
9/2/069/0113	Nooitgedacht, 2 Church Square, Paarl	The original portion of this impressive dwelling, which was erected in the Georgian style, dates from 1850. The building was enlarged in 1880 by Dr Josias Hoffman by the addition of a building in the Victorian idiom of approximately the same size as the o Type of site: House.	Paarl	Paarl	Provincial Heritage Site	33°52′12″S 18°49′35″E	Upload Photo
9/2/069/0114	82 Main Street, Paarl	These properties form an integral part of the historical and architectural nucleus of Paarl. The houses on these erven, the majority of which date from the nineteenth century are representative of the Cape Dutch, Georgian. Victorian and Edwardian styles	Paarl	Paarl	Provincial Heritage Site	33°45′07″S 18°57′42″E	These properties form an integral part of the historical and architectural nucleus of Paarl. The houses on these erven, the majority of which date from the nineteenth century are representative of the Cape Dutch, Georgian. Victorian and Edwardian styles
9/2/069/0115	99 Main Street, Paarl	A rectangular house with its narrow side towards the street. This end has a 6-panelled door flanked by louvred sashes, mid 19th century. On the clipped end appears the date 1889, which probably refers to the roof alteration. These properties form an integral part of the historical and architectural nucleus of Paarl. The houses on these erven, the majority of which date from the nineteenth century are representative of the Cape Dutch, Georgian. Victorian and Edwardian styles	Paarl	Paarl	Provincial Heritage Site	33°46′36″S 18°57′26″E	A rectangular house with its narrow side towards the street. This end has a 6-panelled door flanked by louvred sashes, mid 19th century. On the clipped end appears the date 1889, which probably refers to the roof alteration. These properties form an integral part of the historical and architectural nucleus of Paarl. The houses on these erven, the majority of which date from the nineteenth century are representative of the Cape Dutch, Georgian. Victorian and Edwardian styles
9/2/069/0116	128 and 130 Main Street, Paarl	128 is a 2-storeyed house of 3 bays, probably originally single-storeyed with deep plan, to judge by the disparity in facade woodwork, the lower being c1830, the upper c1870. 130 is a late double-storeyed house. These properties form an integral part of the historical and architectural nucleus of Paarl. The houses on these erven, the majority of which date from the nineteenth century. are representative of the Georgian and the Victorian building styles.	Paarl	Paarl	Provincial Heritage Site	33°46′37″S 18°57′26″E	Upload Photo
9/2/069/0117	195-199 Main Street, Paarl	These properties form an integral part of the historical and architectural nucleus of Paarl. The houses on these erven, the majority of which date from the nineteenth century. are representative of the Georgian and the Victorian building styles.	Paarl	Paarl	Provincial Heritage Site	33°44′34″S 18°57′45″E	These properties form an integral part of the historical and architectural nucleus of Paarl. The houses on these erven, the majority of which date from the nineteenth century. are representative of the Georgian and the Victorian building styles.
9/2/069/0118	Ronwe Homestead, Paarl District	Type of site: Farm Complex.		Paarl	Provincial Heritage Site	33°45′43″S 19°00′11″E	Upload Photo
9/2/069/0119	40 Main Street, Paarl		Paarl	Paarl	Provincial Heritage Site	33°45′39″S 18°57′41″E	
9/2/069/0120	First National Bank, Main Street, Paarl	Type of site: Bank Current use: Bank.	Paarl	Paarl	Provincial Heritage Site	33°43′52″S 18°57′46″E	Type of site: Bank Current use: Bank.
9/2/069/0121	Valencia, Daljosafat, Paarl District	Type of site: Farm Complex		Paarl	Provincial Heritage Site	33°40′18″S 18°54′57″E	Upload Photo
9/2/069/0122	9 Huguenot Street, Franschhoek		Franschhoek	Paarl	Provincial Heritage Site	33°54′47″S 19°07′19″E	
9/2/069/0123	486 Main Street, Paarl		Paarl	Paarl	Provincial Heritage Site	33°42′50″S 18°57′45″E	
9/2/069/0124	42 Main Street, Paarl		Paarl	Paarl	Provincial Heritage Site	33°45′35″S 18°57′41″E	
9/2/069/0125	414 Main Street, Paarl	A T-shaped homestead with woodwork dating from the 1830s. It now has an iron roof, loft-windows. veranda and clipped gables. On the right side there are steps leading to the loft.	Paarl	Paarl	Provincial Heritage Site	33°43′17″S 18°57′47″E	A T-shaped homestead with woodwork dating from the 1830s. It now has an iron roof, loft-windows. veranda and clipped gables. On the right side there are steps leading to the loft.
9/2/069/0126	De Hoop, Main Street, Paarl	De Hoop was settled as 'De Goede Hoop' in 1688 by Jean Cloudon: his name died with him. The house has been modernized, but retains a main gable, dated 1809, neo-classical, bearing the initial of 'L E. De Villiers, widow of Isaac Minnaar'. This lady's widow Type of site: House Current use: House.	Paarl	Paarl	Provincial Heritage Site	33°45′28″S 18°57′34″E	De Hoop was settled as 'De Goede Hoop' in 1688 by Jean Cloudon: his name died with him. The house has been modernized, but retains a main gable, dated 1809, neo-classical, bearing the initial of 'L E. De Villiers, widow of Isaac Minnaar'. This lady's widow Type of site: House Current use: House.
9/2/069/0127	54 and 56 Main Street, Paarl	These properties form an integral part of the historical and architectural nucleus of Paarl. The houses on these erven, the majority of which date from the nineteenth century, are representative of the Cape Dutch, Georgian, Victorian and Edwardian building	Paarl	Paarl	Provincial Heritage Site	33°45′19″S 18°57′42″E	These properties form an integral part of the historical and architectural nucleus of Paarl. The houses on these erven, the majority of which date from the nineteenth century, are representative of the Cape Dutch, Georgian, Victorian and Edwardian building
9/2/069/0128	58 Main Street, Paarl	A rectangular house, 10 m deep; with hipped iron roof and good Victorian detail louvred French windows, curving veranda, louvred loft-windows. These properties form an integral part of the historical and architectural nucleus of Paarl. The houses on these erven, the majority of which date from the nineteenth century, are representative of the Cape Dutch, Georgian, Victorian and Edwardian building	Paarl	Paarl	Provincial Heritage Site	33°45′18″S 18°57′42″E	Upload Photo
9/2/069/0129	84 and 86 Main Street, Paarl	These properties form an integral part of the historical and architectural nucleus of Paarl. The houses on these erven, the majority of which date from the nineteenth century are representative of the Cape Dutch, Georgian. Victorian and Edwardian styles	Paarl	Paarl	Provincial Heritage Site	33°45′07″S 18°57′42″E	These properties form an integral part of the historical and architectural nucleus of Paarl. The houses on these erven, the majority of which date from the nineteenth century are representative of the Cape Dutch, Georgian. Victorian and Edwardian styles
9/2/069/0130	101 Main Street, Paarl	A rectangular house, 2 rooms deep, but with a roof of only 7 m span. The end-gables have been clipped, but the square and pedimented front gable, dated 1854, is an excellent example of its type; the 8-panelled door and the sashes date from the same time. These properties form an integral part of the historical and architectural nucleus of Paarl. The houses on these erven, the majority of which date from the nineteenth century are representative of the Cape Dutch, Georgian. Victorian and Edwardian styles	Paarl	Paarl	Provincial Heritage Site	33°45′21″S 18°57′45″E	A rectangular house, 2 rooms deep, but with a roof of only 7 m span. The end-gables have been clipped, but the square and pedimented front gable, dated 1854, is an excellent example of its type; the 8-panelled door and the sashes date from the same time. These properties form an integral part of the historical and architectural nucleus of Paarl. The houses on these erven, the majority of which date from the nineteenth century are representative of the Cape Dutch, Georgian. Victorian and Edwardian styles
9/2/069/0131	165 Main Street, Paarl	These properties form an integral part of the historical and architectural nucleus of Paarl. The houses on these erven, the majority of which date from the nineteenth century, are representative of the Cape Dutch, Georgian, Victorian and Edwardian building.	Paarl	Paarl	Provincial Heritage Site	33°44′43″S 18°57′45″E	These properties form an integral part of the historical and architectural nucleus of Paarl. The houses on these erven, the majority of which date from the nineteenth century, are representative of the Cape Dutch, Georgian, Victorian and Edwardian building.
9/2/069/0133	Zeedeberg House, 1 Zeederberg Square, Paarl	It has a hipped roof and is built of brick, whitewashed, not plastered. Its facade is 3 bays wide, with fine louvred sashes and a door with a plaster surround. At the side there is an equally well-proportioned coach-house with round-headed door and a pr A double-storeyed house, dominating Zeederberg Square - example of early Victorian town-house design. The complex can be dated at about 1850. Type of site: House.	Paarl	Paarl	Provincial Heritage Site	33°44′42″S 18°57′42″E	It has a hipped roof and is built of brick, whitewashed, not plastered. Its facade is 3 bays wide, with fine louvred sashes and a door with a plaster surround. At the side there is an equally well-proportioned coach-house with round-headed door and a pr A double-storeyed house, dominating Zeederberg Square - example of early Victorian town-house design. The complex can be dated at about 1850. Type of site: House.
9/2/069/0134	Town Hall, 256 Main Street, Paarl	Type of site: Town Hall Current use: Town hall.	Paarl	Paarl	Provincial Heritage Site	33°43′55″S 18°57′46″E	Type of site: Town Hall Current use: Town hall.
9/2/069/0135	Joostenberg, Muldersvlei, Paarl District	The road from Stellenbosch to Malmesbury crosses the national road from Cape Town to Paarl by an overhead bridge about 40 kilometres from Cape Town. Not far away, in the northern angle of these two roads, amongst some trees, stands the old Cape Dutch house Type of site: Farm Complex. A particularly fine Old Cape farmhouse. The front gable bears the date 1756. It is, as far as is known, the oldest Old Cape gable still in existence and probably the only remaining gable of its type.		Paarl	Provincial Heritage Site	33°48′42″S 18°48′35″E	Upload Photo
9/2/069/0136	Oude Kelder, Bo La Motte, Paarl District		Paarl	Paarl	National Monument		Upload Photo
9/2/069/0137	Watergat, Simondium, Paarl District	It is a good example of a late house, although the houses of this period have lost the elegance and disciplined proportions of the earlier ones. It has a rectangular plan. 2 rooms deep, and the gable is square and pedimented. It has a greater height than the asymmetrical house was presumably erected in 1863 by C. F. Beyers. The gable depicts the simple lines of the penultimate phase of the Cape Dutch architectural style. Granted to Henning Villion in 1712, as payment of a debt owed him a certain Willem Type of site: Farm Complex.		Paarl	Provincial Heritage Site	33°50′43″S 18°59′05″E	Upload Photo
9/2/069/0138	4 Zeederberg Street, Paarl	A double-storeyed house with iron roof and windows of 19th century. Its ornate veranda is similar to that of no 3.".	Paarl	Paarl	Provincial Heritage Site	33°44′42″S 18°57′42″E	A double-storeyed house with iron roof and windows of 19th century. Its ornate veranda is similar to that of no 3.".
9/2/069/0139	Landskroon, Paarl District	Landskroon was settled by Jan Holsmit in 1691: the present house was built by Pieter De Villiers, in whose family it remained for over a century. The main gable is dated 1769, and is an example of the florid type surprisingly elaborate for so early a date Type of site: Farm Complex.		Paarl	Provincial Heritage Site	33°46′17″S 18°55′27″E	Upload Photo
9/2/069/0140	Taalmonument, Paarlberg, Paarl		Paarl	Paarl	National Monument	33°45′58″S 18°56′36″E	
9/2/069/0141	Schoongezicht, 52 Main Street, Paarl	It is an L-shaped house, with door, windows and gable (with pediment but without pilasters) all dating from c1840. It has stepped end-gables. N of the house and now on a different property, there is what must have been a wine-cellar: it dates from roughly This house stands on land granted to Pieter Canzius van Blommestein in 1819; it was a trifle over 8 morgen in extent. In the same year he built a house, now demolished, on the upper part of the farm (see Elliott, 881). The farm was transferred in 1821 to.	Paarl	Paarl	Provincial Heritage Site	33°45′48″S 18°57′40″E	It is an L-shaped house, with door, windows and gable (with pediment but without pilasters) all dating from c1840. It has stepped end-gables. N of the house and now on a different property, there is what must have been a wine-cellar: it dates from roughly This house stands on land granted to Pieter Canzius van Blommestein in 1819; it was a trifle over 8 morgen in extent. In the same year he built a house, now demolished, on the upper part of the farm (see Elliott, 881). The farm was transferred in 1821 to.
9/2/069/0142	Jewish cemetery, Paarl		Paarl	Paarl	National Monument		Upload Photo
9/2/069/0143	La Garomme Beacon, Paarl District		Paarl	Paarl			Upload Photo
9/2/069/0144	Zondernaam, Groot Drakenstein, Paarl District		Paarl	Paarl			Upload Photo
9/2/069/0145	Dutch Reformed Church Cemetery, Dirkie Uys Street, Franschhoek	Type of site: Graveyard.	Franschhoek	Paarl	Provincial Heritage Site	33°54′28″S 19°07′09″E	Type of site: Graveyard. Media related to Dutch Reformed Graveyard, Franschhoek at Wikimedia Commons
9/2/069/0146	Eendracht, La Rochelle Girls' School, Faure Street, Paarl		Paarl	Paarl	National Monument	33°44′15″S 18°57′55″E	Upload Photo
9/2/069/0147	La Brie, Paarl District		Paarl	Paarl	Pending Declaration		Upload Photo
9/2/069/0148	Hof Street Cemetery, Berg River Boulevard, Paarl		Paarl	Paarl			Upload Photo
9/2/069/0149	271 Main Street, Paarl		Paarl	Paarl		33°44′10″S 18°57′47″E	Upload Photo
9/2/069/0150	Nantes Vue, 56 Mill Street, Paarl		Paarl	Paarl	Provincial Heritage Site	33°43′50″S 18°57′30″E	
9/2/069/0151	64 and 66 Mill Street, Paarl		Paarl	Paarl	Provincial Heritage Site	33°43′48″S 18°57′30″E	
9/2/069/0152	39 Dirkie Uys Street, Franschhoek		Franschhoek	Paarl	National Monument	33°54′18″S 19°07′04″E	Upload Photo
9/2/069/0153	42 Dirkie Uys Street, Franschhoek		Franschhoek	Paarl		33°54′21″S 19°07′04″E	Upload Photo
9/2/069/0155	48 Mill Street, Paarl		Franschhoek	Paarl		33°43′53″S 18°57′32″E	Upload Photo
9/2/069/0156	La Chaumiere, 49 Dirkie Uys Street, Franschhoek		Franschhoek	Paarl		33°54′12″S 19°07′00″E	Upload Photo
9/2/069/0157	42A Main Street, Paarl	These properties form an integral part of the historical and architectural nucleus of Paarl. The houses on these erven, the majority of which date from the nineteenth century, are representative of the Cape Dutch, Georgian, Victorian and Edwardian building	Paarl	Paarl	Provincial Heritage Site	33°45′35″S 18°57′41″E	These properties form an integral part of the historical and architectural nucleus of Paarl. The houses on these erven, the majority of which date from the nineteenth century, are representative of the Cape Dutch, Georgian, Victorian and Edwardian building
9/2/069/0158	PAARL MAGISTERIAL DISTRICT, GENERAL		Paarl	Paarl			Upload Photo
9/2/069/0159	L'Orleans, Dal Josafat, Paarl		Paarl	Paarl			Upload Photo
9/2/069/0160	Langvlei Farm, Suider Paarl, Paarl District		Paarl	Paarl			Upload Photo
9/2/069/0161	5 Malan Street, Paarl	This is a mid- to late 19th-century residential building, which is in fairly good condition. It retains some of its joinery and much of its architectural character. The building is situated within the historic precinct of Paarl and is of contextual impor	Paarl	Paarl	Register	33°43′24″S 18°57′44″E	Upload Photo
9/2/069/0162	451 Main Street, Paarl		Paarl	Paarl		33°43′18″S 18°57′49″E	Upload Photo
9/2/069/0163	1 Church Square, 157-161 Main Street, Paarl		Paarl	Paarl	Pending Register	33°44′52″S 18°57′44″E	Upload Photo
9/2/069/0164	St Stephen's Church, Erf 4856, Main Street, Paarl		Paarl	Paarl	Pending Register		Upload Photo
9/2/069/0165	Lanquedoc, Groot Drakenstein, Paarl		Paarl	Paarl		33°43′10″S 19°00′47″E	Upload Photo
9/2/069/0166	Victor Verster prison "Madiba House", farm Watervleit	SIGNIFICANCE Nelson Rolihlahla Mandela was one of South Africa's leaders. It was at Drakenstein Correctional Services, formally known as Victor Verster Prison that th	Paarl	Paarl	National Heritage Site	33°49′56″S 18°59′05″E	Upload Photo
9/2/069/0167	De Poort, Main Street, Paarl		Paarl	Paarl			Upload Photo
