= Dameron =

Variety of grape

- Grape (Vitis)
- Color of berry skin: Noir
- Species: Vitis vinifera
- Also called: Pinot Rouge (more)
- Origin: France
- Notable regions: northern Burgundy, Jura
- VIVC number: 3406

Dameron is a traditional French variety of red wine grape that is a sibling of Gamay. Its wines are somewhat weightier than Gamay, but it is disappearing from its traditional areas in northern France. Not much is grown in France these days.

== History ==
DNA fingerprinting has shown that it is one of many grapes to be the result of a cross between Gouais blanc (Heunisch) and Pinot, making it a full sibling of famous varieties such as Chardonnay and Aligoté. Gouais blanc was widely grown by the French peasantry in the Medieval ages. This offered many opportunities for hybridization, and the offspring benefited from hybrid vigor as the parents were genetically quite different.

Other Gouais blanc/Pinot crosses include Aubin vert, Auxerrois, Bachet noir, Beaunoir, Franc Noir de la Haute-Saône, Gamay Blanc Gloriod, Gamay, Melon, Knipperlé, Peurion, Romorantin, Roublot, and Sacy.

== Viticulture ==
Yields are sporadic thanks to its disease susceptibility.

== Wine regions ==
A little is still grown north of Dijon and in the Jura.

== Synonyms ==
Dameret noir, Durbec, Foirard noir, Gros Bec, Luisant noir, Noir De Lorraine, Noir Facan, Noirgot, Pinot Rouge, Simoro, Valais noir, Valdenois, Verdun, Verdunais, Vert noir
