= Folle blanche =

Variety of grape

Folle Blanche
- Grape (Vitis)
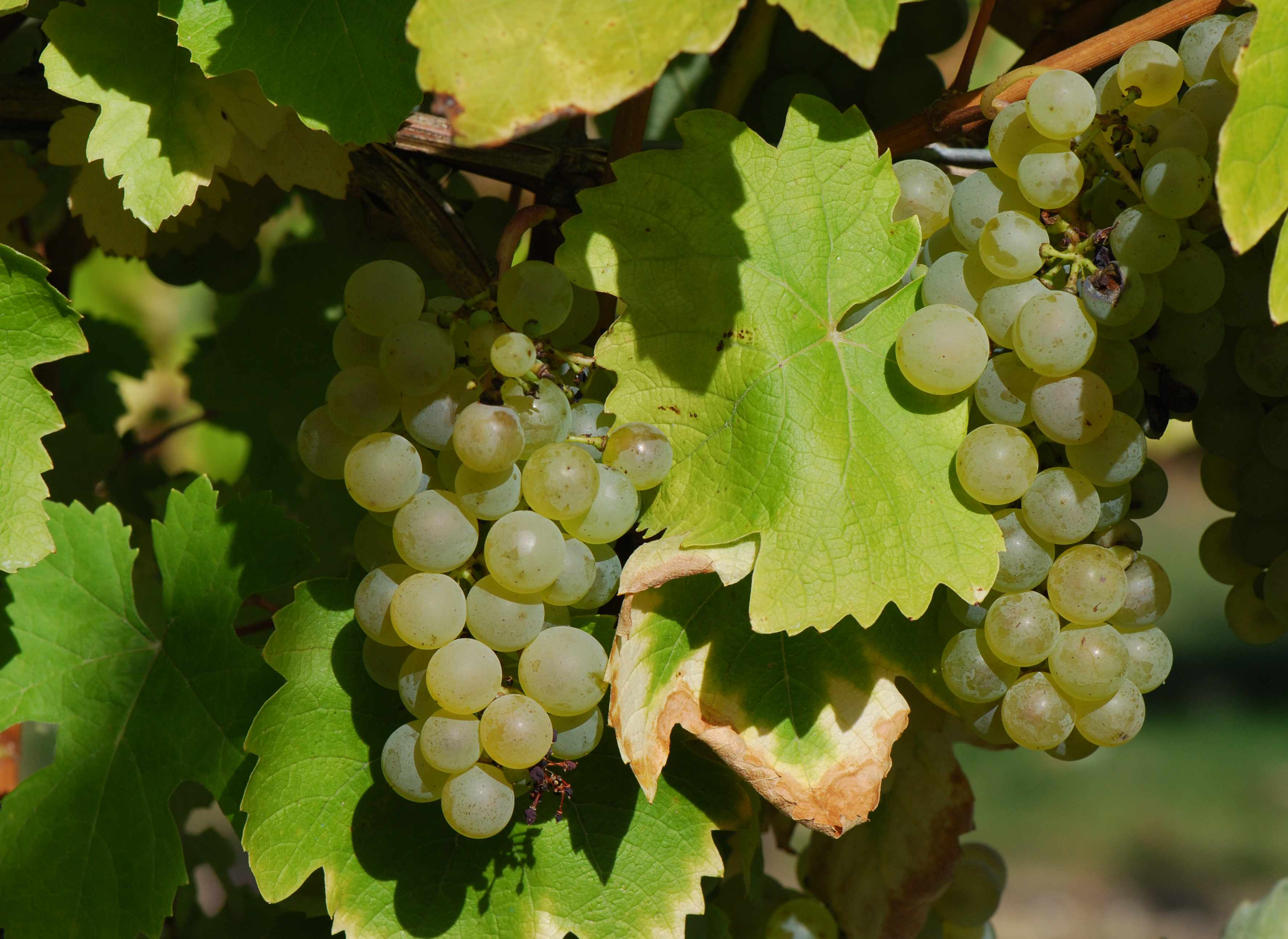
- Folle blanche grapes
- Color of berry skin: Blanc
- Species: Vitis vinifera
- Also called: see list of synonyms
- Origin: France
- Notable regions: Western Loire (Pays Nantais)
- Notable wines: Gros Plant du Pays Nantais
- VIVC number: 4183

Folle blanche (French pronunciation: [fɔl blɑ̃ʃ]), also known as Picpoule, (Note: Spelling variations include Piquepoul and Picpoul) (Note: It is unrelated to the Picpoul of the Languedoc) Gros Plant, and Enrageat blanc, is a wine grape variety from southwest France. It was the traditional grape variety in Cognac and Armagnac production until the 20th century. Folle blanche is an offspring of Gouais blanc, with the other parent so far unidentified.

In Cognac, the cultivation of Folle blanche is increasing again among enthusiastic wine farmers, but from a very low level.

In Armagnac it has been mostly replaced by its hybrid offspring Baco blanc due to phylloxera damage. Baco blanc (also known as Baco 22 A) is a cross of Folle blanche and the Vitis riparia × Vitis labrusca hybrid Noah. Folle blanche is also the parent of the very hardy and disease-resistant Baco 1 (or Baco noir), a cross of Folle blanche and a Vitis riparia variety. Baco noir and Baco 22 A, like Folle blanche and their other parents, produce a very acid wine. This makes them more suited to distillation than less acidic grapes.

Folle blanche is used in the Loire Valley area and in Brittany around Nantes to produce Gros Plant du Pays Nantais, a very dry and often tartly acidic wine that pairs well with shellfish. There it is used both in the production of table wine as well as eau de vie.

== History ==
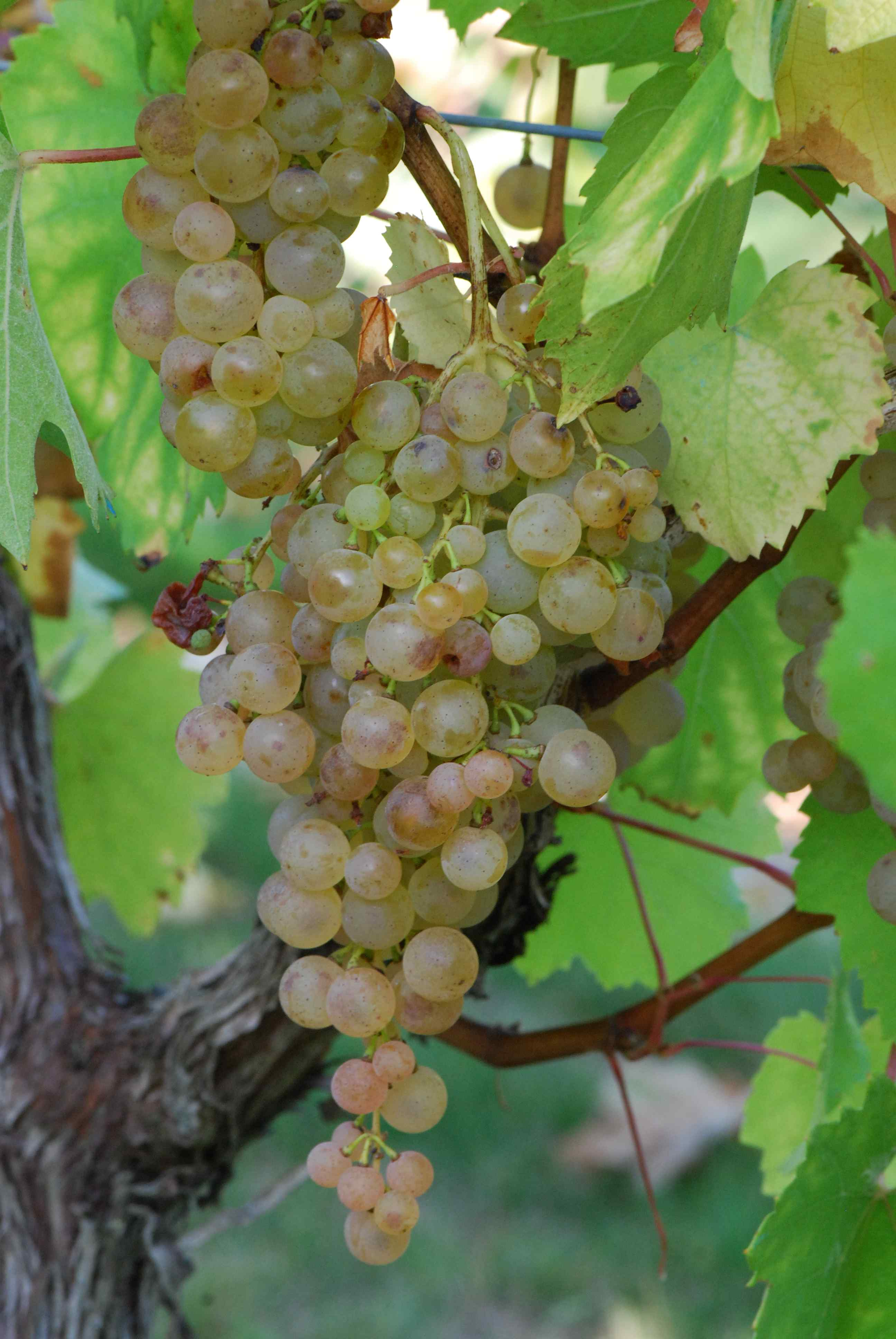
Gouais blanc, one of the parent varieties of Folle blanche.

The first recorded mentioning of Folle blanche was in 1696 when the grape was documented as one of the varieties growing in the Charente-Maritime department. Here the grape has had a long history being used in the production of Cognac and Armagnac. The name Folle is a feminine derivative of the French word fou which means "mad" with ampelographers speculating that this could be a reference to the grapevine's tendency to being highly productive and grow vigorously where ever it is planted. Several of Folle blanche's synonyms also seems to make similar allusions such as Gros Plant ("big vine") which was first used for the grape in 1732 in the Loire-Atlantique department and Enrageat (from the French enragé) that has been a common synonym for Folle blanche in Southwest France since at least 1736.

DNA analysis in the late 20th and early 21st century has concluded that Folle blanche is likely one of the numerous offspring vines of Gouais blanc, though the second parent is currently unknown. In 2001, French ampelographer Guy Lavignac theorized that Folle blanche likely originated in either the Landes or Gers departments of Southwest France due to the proliferation of offspring and sibling varieties of Folle blanche in those regions.

Historically, Folle blanche was planted along the western coast of France from the Loire Valley down through Gascony by Dutch wine merchants who used it in the production of eau de vie. After the phylloxera epidemic of the 19th century, plantings of Folle blanche declined as wine growers switched to heartier, more rot resistant varieties such as the Baco blanc grape in the Cognac and Armagnac regions. This trend continued throughout most of the 20th century and into the 21st century as plantings of Folle blanche steadily declined from 15,865 hectares (39,200 acres) in 1958 to 1,770 hectares (4,400 acres) in 2009.

=== Relationship to other grapes ===
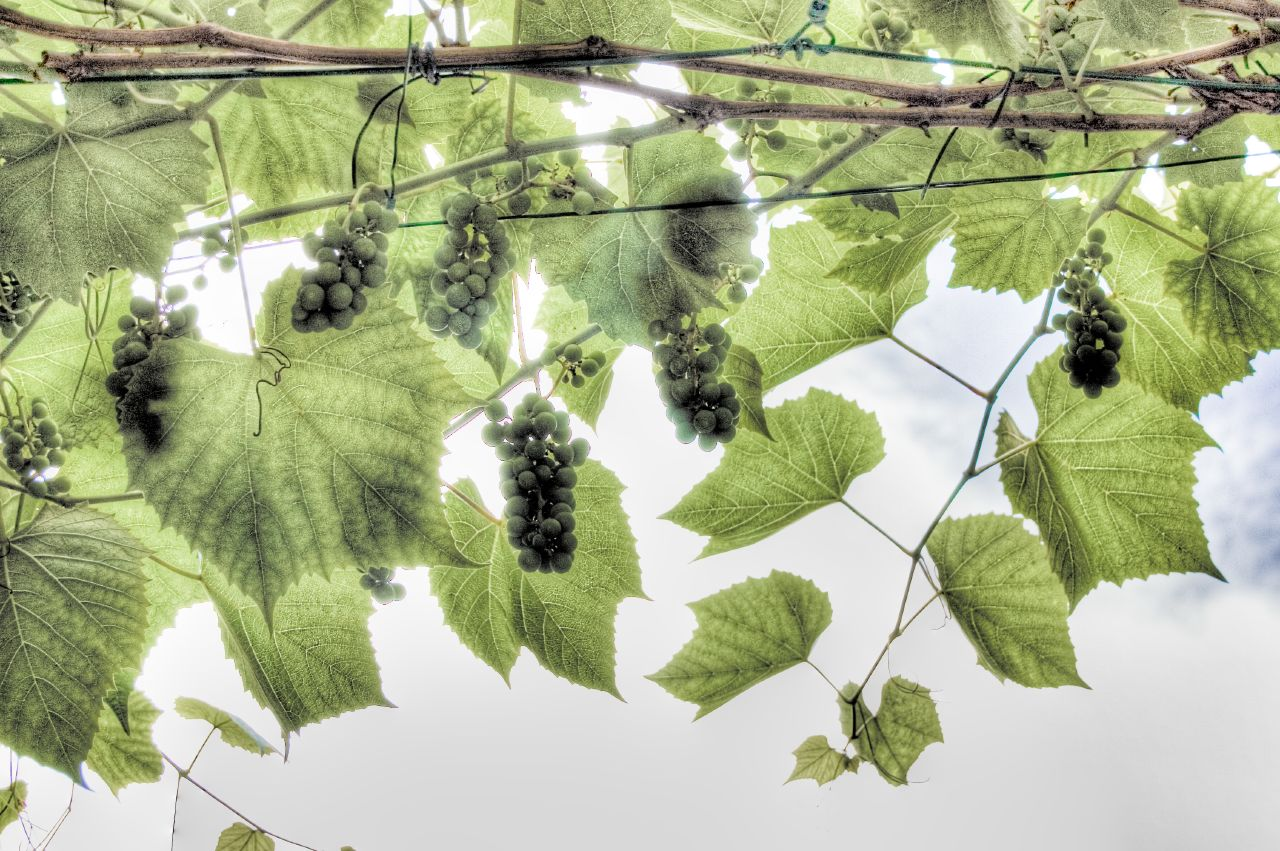
Baco noir, one of the offspring grape varieties of Folle blanche created by François Baco.

Through its offspring relationship with the Hunnic grape Gouais blanc, Folle blanche is at least a half-sibling of numerous grape varieties including Aubin vert, Bachet noir, Knipperlé, Montils, Peurion, Roublot, Dameron, Balzac blanc and Genouillet. American ampelographer Linda Bisson classifies Folle blanche as a member of the Folle ampelographic group with strong similarities and potential genetic relationship with fellow Folle grapes Meslier-Saint-François and Petit Meslier.

The rare Bordeaux wine grape Merlot blanc is a natural crossing of Folle blanche and Merlot that was discovered in 1891. Other grapes that have a parent-offspring relationship with Folle blanche include Monbadon, also known as Burger in California, which is believed to be a crossing of Folle blanche and Ugni blanc and Jurancon blanc, which is believed to be a crossing of Folle blanche with Pruéras

At one point Folle blanche was thought to be a color mutation of Jurancon noir (which is also known as Folle noire) but DNA analysis in 2009 showed that the black berried Jurancon grape was actually an offspring of Folle blanche through a natural crossing with Malbec. Additionally, Fuella nera (another grape known under the synonym Folle noire) was once speculated to have been a color mutation but DNA evidence has shown that is not the case.

Folle blanche has been used to breed a number of new varieties including Baco blanc (with Noah) and Baco noir (with an unknown Vitis riparia species) with both made by grape breeder François Baco as well as Folignan which was created in 1965 at the Institut national de la recherche agronomique (INRA) as a crossing with Ugni blanc.

=== Confusion with other varieties ===
Due to its complex genetic relationship with numerous varieties, Folle blanche is often mistaken for grape varieties that share some familial relationship such as its half-sibling Knipperlé. The synonyms Piquepoul used in the Gascony region and Piquepoul du Gers used in the Lot-et-Garonne department lead to confusion with the Rhône wine grape Piquepoul blanc but DNA analysis has shown no close relationship with the two varieties.

== Viticulture ==
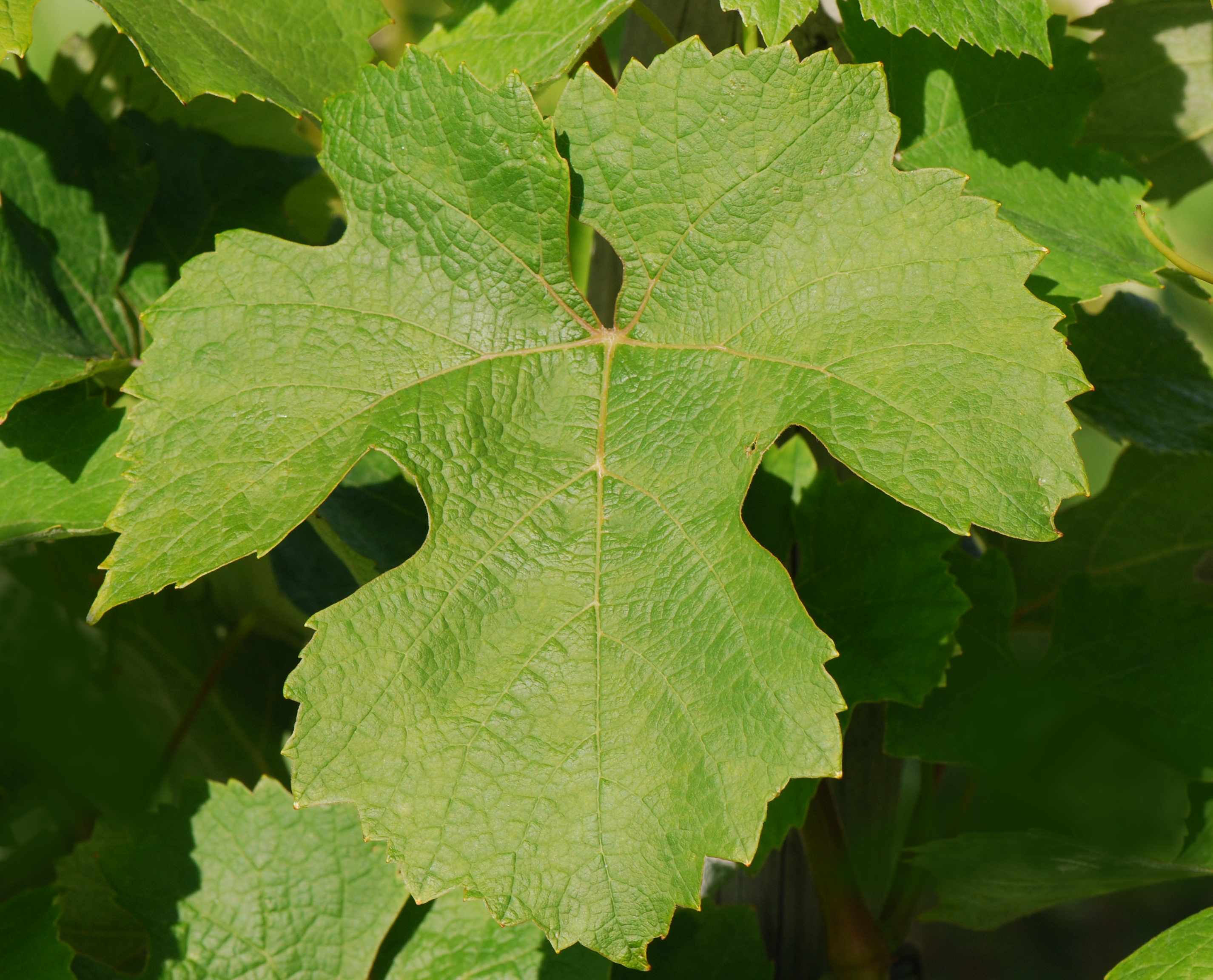
Grape leaf from a Folle blanche vine.

While Folle blanche can be a very productive, mid-ripening and high yielding variety, it is highly susceptible to a number of viticultural hazards including downy mildew, mites and black rot. The early budding nature of the vine also makes it susceptible to spring time frost damage while the very compact clusters makes the berries susceptible to fungal infections like botrytis bunch rot.

== Wine regions ==
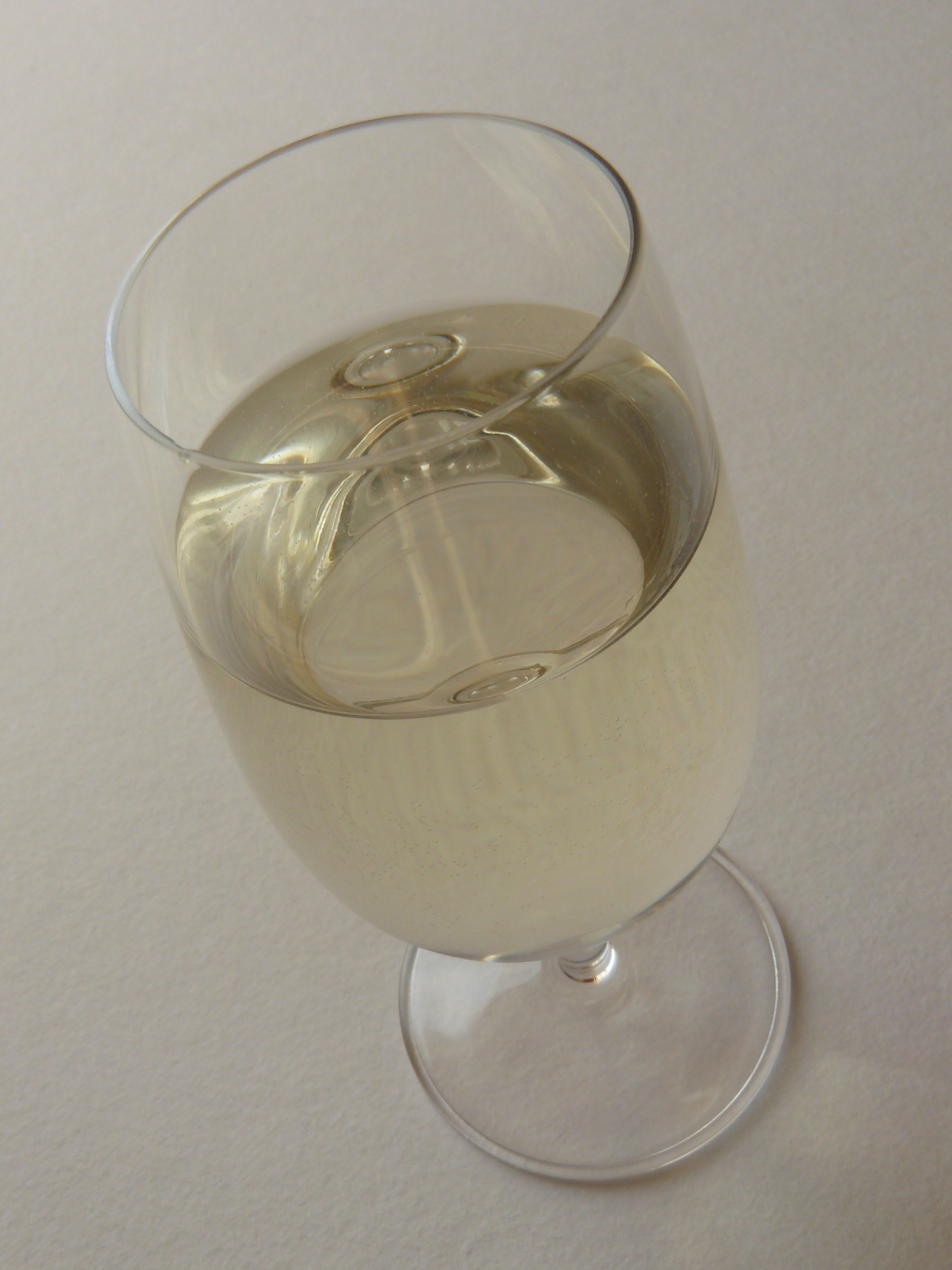
A glass of Gros Plant du Pays Nantais made from Folle blanche (Gros Plant).

In 2009, there was 1,770 hectares (4,400 acres) of Folle blanche growing in France, most of it in the Pay Nantais region (overlapping the Muscadet region) of the Loire Valley where it is used to make the Appellation d'Origine Contrôlée (AOC) wine Gros Plant du Pays Nantais. While the grape's use in Cognac and Armagnac has largely fallen out of favor in preference to Baco blanc, some producers in Armagnac make a varietal brandy out of the grape.

Outside France Folle blanche is grown in the Basque Country where it is known as Mune Mahatsa and is sometimes blended with Hondarribi Zuri (Courbu blanc). In the Catalan wine region of Spain it is used by some brandy producers. In California there are a few limited plantings of the variety.

== Styles ==
According to Master of Wine Jancis Robinson, Folle blanche tends to produce rustic base wines with high levels of acidity.

== Synonyms ==
Over the years, Folle blanche has been known under a variety of synonyms including:

- Amounedat
- Bordelais
- Bouillon
- Burageat
- Came Braque, Camobraque,
- Canut, Canut du Lot et Garonne,
- Chalosse blanche (in the Gers and Landes region), Chalot,
- Dame blanc, Dame blanche (in the Lot-et-Garonne region), Damery,
- Engreat blanc,
- Enrachat, Enragé (in the Gironde), Enrageade, Enrageat (in the Gironde), Enrageat blanc,
- Feher Folle, Fol, Fol Belyi, Folle (in the Charente), Folle De Bordeaux, Fou,
- Fütterer,
- Grais, Grais Bouillon,
- Gros Meslier,
- Gros Plant (in the Pay Nantais and Vendée),
- Grosse Blanquette,
- Grosse Chalosse,
- Matza Zuri (in País Vasco),
- Mendic, Mendik, Mondic,
- Mune Mahatsa (in País Vasco),
- Petit Verjus,
- Pic Pouille blanc, Picpouille, Picpoul, Picpoule, Picpoult d'Armagnac, Picpout, Picquepouille, Piquepoul (in Gascony), Piquepoul du Gers (in Lot-et-Garonne), Piquepoult, Piquepout,
- Plant de Dame, Plant de Madame, Plant de Madone,
- Pochelle blanche,
- Rebauche,
- Rochelle blanc, Rochelle blanche, Rochelle verte,
- Roumain,
- Taloche du Lot, Talosse,
- Ugne blanche.
