= Gamay Blanc Gloriod =

French white wine grape

- Grape (Vitis)
- Color of berry skin: Blanc
- Species: Vitis vinifera
- Origin: France
- Notable regions: Burgundy
- VIVC number: 4364

Gamay Blanc Gloriod is an obscure French variety of white wine grape. Very little of it is grown commercially.

It is named after Émile Gloriod, who discovered it as a seedling; it was originally thought to be a white version of the Gamay grape. "Gamay Blanc" was already used as an alternative name for Chardonnay, which is another white grape that looks like Gamay.

== History ==
The gardener Émile Gloriod, from Gy in Haute-Saône, discovered Gamay Blanc Gloriod in 1895.

At first it was thought to be a seedling of Gamay, and conventional ampelography linked it to the Melon variety, but DNA fingerprinting showed that along with Chardonnay and Aligoté, it is one of many grapes to be the result of a cross between Gouais blanc (Heunisch) and Pinot. Gouais blanc was widely grown by the French peasantry in the Medieval ages.

Other Gouais blanc/Pinot crosses include Aubin vert, Auxerrois, Bachet noir, Beaunoir, Franc Noir de la Haute-Saône, Gamay, Melon, Knipperlé, Peurion, Romorantin, Roublot, and Sacy.

== Viticulture ==
The yield of Gamay Blanc Gloriod is variable; it produces small, cylindrical bunches of small grapes.

== Wine regions ==
Gamay Blanc Gloriod is grown in its home territory around Burgundy.

== Synonyms ==
none
