= Romorantin =

Variety of grape

- Grape (Vitis)
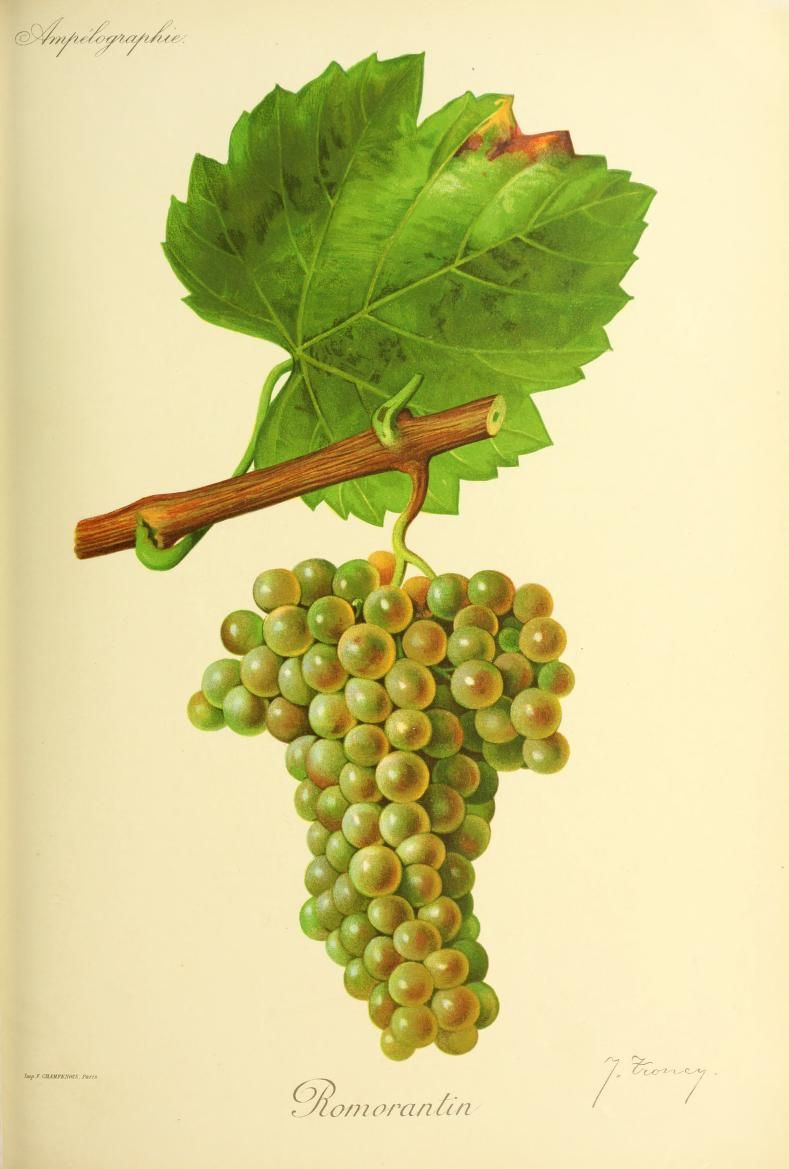
- Color of berry skin: Blanc
- Species: Vitis vinifera
- Also called: Gros Plant De Villefranche (more)
- Origin: France
- Notable regions: Loire
- Notable wines: Cour-Cheverny
- VIVC number: 10185

Romorantin is a traditional French variety of white wine grape; it is a sibling of Chardonnay. Once quite widely grown in the Loire, it has now only seen in the Cour-Cheverny. It produces intense, minerally wines somewhat reminiscent of Chablis.

== History ==
Legend has it that Romorantin was introduced to the Loire by King Francis I of France (1494–1547). The commune of Romorantin-Lanthenay is not far from the grape's stronghold in the Cheverny AOC, suggesting that the grape's name reflects a geographical connection - the king was from the region.

DNA fingerprinting has shown that it is one of many grapes to be the result of a cross between Gouais blanc (Heunisch) and Pinot fin teinturier, making it a sibling of famous varieties such as Chardonnay and Aligoté.

== Distribution and wines ==
Romorantin was once quite widely grown in the Loire, but has now retreated to the Cour-Cheverny AOC, a small enclave of the Cheverny AOC which lies south of Blois. There are thirty five producers listed for this small AOP listed on the website of Le Maison des Vins de Cheverny.

A Romorantin vineyard at Domaine Henry Marionnet claims to be the oldest in France. It was planted in 1850 and somehow survived the phylloxera epidemic that devastated European vineyards in the late 19th century.

== Vine and viticulture ==
Romorantin prefers warmer conditions than most 'Loire' varieties.

== Synonyms ==
Blanc De Villefranche, Celle Bruere, Dameri, Daneri, Danesy, Dannery, Framboise, Gros Blanc De Villefranche, Gros Plant De Villefranche, Lyonnaise Blanche, Maclon, Petit Dannezy, Petit Maconnais, Plant De Breze, Raisin De Grave, Ramorantin, Romoranten, Romorantin Blanc, Saint Amand, Verneuil.

== See also ==
- Other Gouais blanc/Pinot crosses include Aubin vert, Auxerrois, Bachet noir, Beaunoir, Franc Noir de la-Haute-Saône, Gamay Blanc Gloriod, Gamay noir, Melon, Knipperlé, Peurion, Roublot, and Sacy
