= Franc Noir de la Haute-Saône =

Variety of grape

- Grape (Vitis)
- Color of berry skin: Noir
- Species: Vitis vinifera
- Also called: Gougenot (more)
- Origin: France
- Notable regions: Haute-Saône
- VIVC number: 4916

Franc Noir de la Haute-Saône is a traditional French variety of red wine grape that is a sibling of Chardonnay. It makes thin, tart wine and has largely disappeared from cultivation.

== History ==
DNA fingerprinting has shown that it is one of many grapes to be the result of a cross between Gouais blanc (Heunisch) and Pinot, making it a full sibling of famous varieties such as Chardonnay and Aligoté. Gouais blanc was widely grown by the French peasantry in the Medieval ages.

Other Gouais blanc/Pinot crosses include Aubin vert, Auxerrois, Bachet noir, Beaunoir, Gamay Blanc Gloriod, Gamay noir, Melon, Knipperlé, Peurion, Romorantin, Roublot, and Sacy

== Viticulture ==
Franc Noir de la Haute-Saône is a vigorous vine, producing small compact bunches of grapes.

== Wine regions ==
As the name suggests, Franc Noir de la Haute-Saône is grown in the area north of Burgundy, but like Bachet noir and Beaunoir, it is dying out.

== Synonyms ==
Franc Noir De Cendrecourt, Franc Noir De Gy, Franc Noir De Jussey, Franc Noir De Venere, Gougenot, Gougenot Saône, Plant Jacquot
