= Beaunoir =

Variety of grape

- Grape (Vitis)
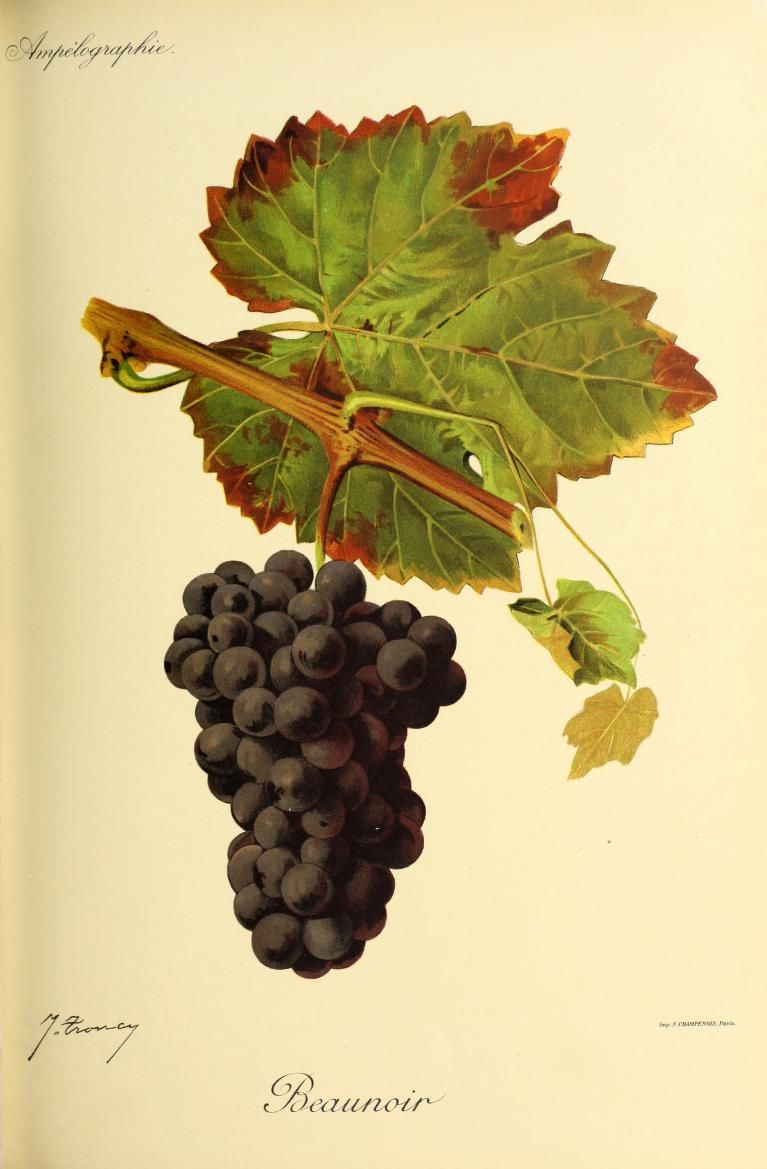
- Color of berry skin: Noir
- Species: Vitis vinifera
- Also called: Pinot D'Orleans (more)
- Origin: France
- VIVC number: 1062

Beaunoir (French pronunciation: [bonwaʁ]) is a traditional French variety of red wine grape that is a sibling of Chardonnay. The 'beautiful black' grape produces a thin wine and not much is grown these days.

== History ==
DNA fingerprinting has shown that it is one of many grapes to be the result of a cross between Gouais blanc (Heunisch) and Pinot, making it a full sibling of famous varieties such as Chardonnay and Aligoté. Gouais blanc was widely grown by the French peasantry in the Medieval ages. This offered many opportunities for hybridisation, and the offspring benefited from hybrid vigour as the parents were genetically quite different.

Other Gouais blanc/Pinot crosses include Aubin vert, Auxerrois, Bachet noir, Franc Noir de la-Haute-Saône, Gamay Blanc Gloriod, Gamay noir, Melon, Knipperlé, Peurion, Romorantin, Roublot, and Sacy

== Viticulture ==
Beaunoir is quite vigorous, producing small compact bunches of small grapes.

== Wine regions ==
Like Bachet noir, Beaunoir has almost disappeared from its home in Châtillon-sur-Seine and the Aube, between Champagne and Burgundy. The wine is very ordinary, with low alcohol and little color.

== Synonyms ==
Cep Gris, Co Gris, Mourillon, Pinot D'Ai, Pinot D'Orleans, Seau Gris, Sogris
