= Knipperlé =

French wine

- Grape (Vitis)
- Color of berry skin: Blanc
- Species: Vitis vinifera
- Also called: Ortlieber (more)
- Origin: France
- Notable regions: Alsace
- VIVC number: 6312

Knipperlé is a traditional French variety of white wine grape from Alsace. It's not listed for use in AOC wine, but is a minor component of blends for local drinking, in some ways an Alsatian equivalent of its sibling Aligoté in Burgundy.

== History ==
Nurseryman Johann Michael Ortlieb brought the grape to Riquewihr in 1756. It is probably closely related to Räuschling.

DNA fingerprinting has shown that it is one of many grapes to be the result of a cross between Gouais blanc (Heunisch) and Pinot, making it a full sibling of famous varieties such as Chardonnay. Gouais blanc was widely grown by the peasantry in the Medieval ages. This offered many opportunities for hybridization, and the offspring benefited from hybrid vigor as the parents were genetically quite different.

Other Gouais blanc/Pinot crosses include Aubin vert, Auxerrois, Bachet noir, Beaunoir, Franc Noir de la Haute-Saône, Gamay Blanc Gloriod, Gamay, Melon, Peurion, Romorantin, Roublot, and Sacy.

Knipperlé is a parent of the following grapes, mostly riparia hybrids with Millardet et Grasset 101-14 : Bon noir, Colmar Precoce noir, Fin noir, Gutkniperle, Kuhlmann 252-3, Kuhlmann 274-1, Millardet Et Grasset 101-14 X Ortlieber, Neron, Triomphe D'Alsace, Victoire

== Viticulture ==
The vine is vigorous but yields are variable, and it is particularly susceptible to grey rot.

== Wine regions ==
Some Knipperlé is still grown in Alsace for local consumption, but is slowly disappearing.

== Synonyms ==
Beli Kleschiz, Breisgauer Riesling, Colmer, Drobni Kleshiz, Elsaesser, Eltinger, Faktor, Gelber Ortlieber, Kauka Weiss, Kipperle, Klein Rauschling, Kleiner Gelber, Kleiner Methuesser, Klescec, Kleschiz Beli, Knackerle, Kniperle, Libiza, Mali Javor, Metsuesser Klein, Mielleux Petit, Oettlinger, Ortlibi Sarga, Ortlieber, Ortlieber A 2, Ortlieber Früh, Ortlieber Gelb, Ortlieber Grün, Ortlieber Spaet, Ortlieber Weiss, Ortlieber Weisser, Ortliebi, Ortliebske Rane, Ortliebstraube, Petit Mielleux, Raeuschling Klein, Reichenweiberer, Reichenweierer, Reichenweiherer, Rochelle, Rochelle Blanche, Roshel, Rungauer, Sibiza, Türkheimer
