= Gros blanc =

Gros blanc is the name for several French and Italian wine grape varieties including:

- Elbling weiss
- Gouais blanc
- Graisse
- Luglienga
- Melon (grape)
- Petoin
- Prié blanc
- Sacy (grape)
