= Aubin vert =

Variety of grape

Aubin vert is a white French wine grape variety that is grown in the Lorraine region where it is an authorized variety for the Appellation d'Origine Contrôlée (AOC) wines of the Moselle. While often confused for the Côtes de Toul grape Aubin blanc, DNA analysis in 1999 showed that Aubin vert was the result of a crossing of Gouais blanc with Pinot (an ancestor vine to Pinot noir). This makes the grape a half-sibling to Aubin blanc (a cross of Gouais blanc and the Jura wine grape Savagnin) but full sibling to Chardonnay, Aligoté, Gamay and Melon de Bourgogne.

== History ==
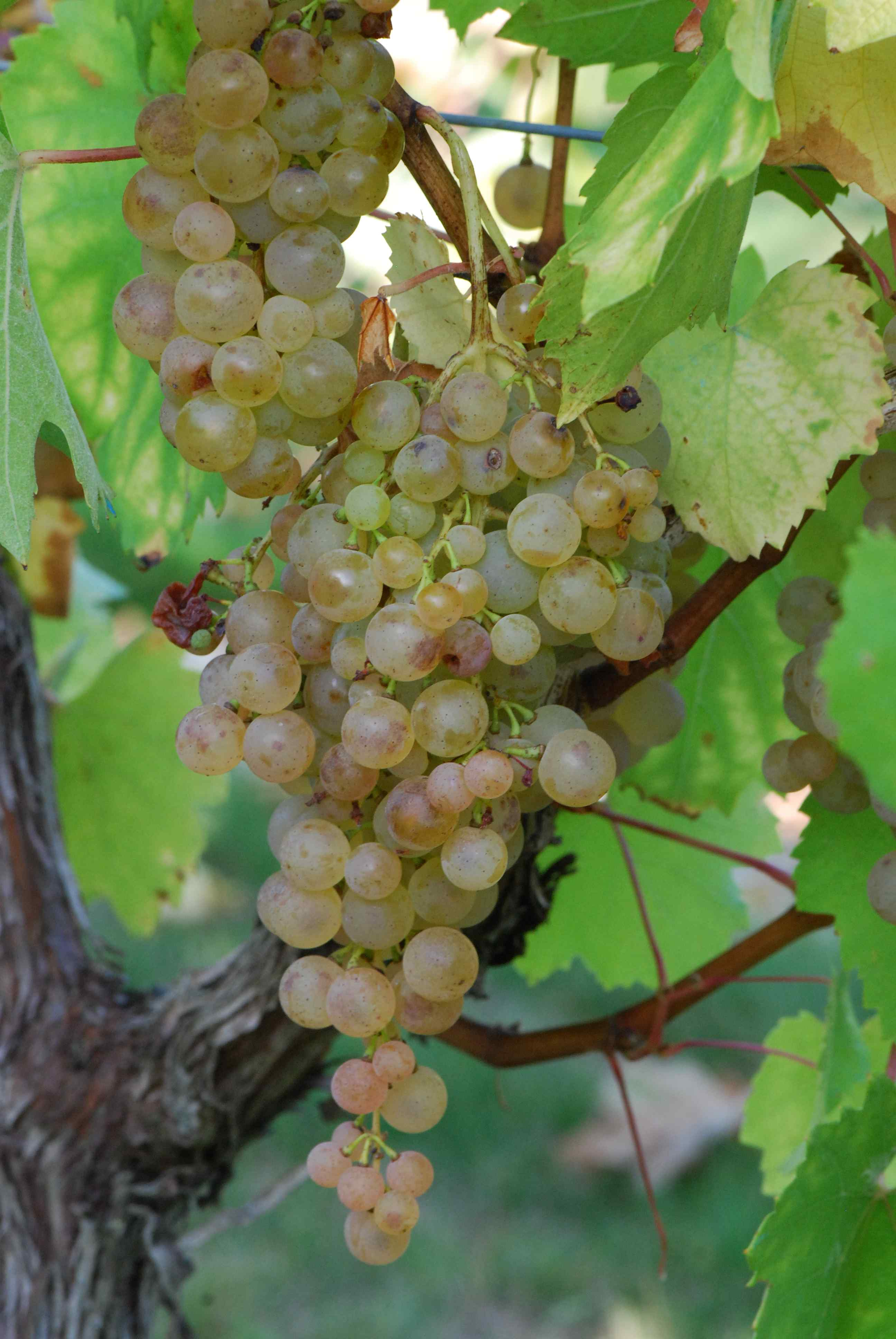
Gouais blanc, one of the parent varieties of Aubin vert.

Ampelographers believe that first recorded mention of Aubin vert was in 1722 when a variety known as Aubins was recorded growing in the Moselle region by a document from the parliament of Metz. The plural usage of Aubins suggest that Aubin blanc and Aubin vert were often counted together. The first occurrence of the name Aubin vert itself appeared in 1829.

=== Parentage and relationship to other grapes ===
In 1999, ampelographers at the University of California, Davis confirmed the parentage of Aubin vert as being the product of the prolific Pinot x Gouais crossing which is responsible for several grape varieties including Aligoté, Auxerrois blanc, Bachet noir, Beaunoir, Chardonnay, Franc Noir de la-Haute-Saône, Gamay Blanc Gloriod, Gamay noir, Melon de Bourgogne, Knipperlé, Peurion, Roublot, and Sacy grape varieties.

== Viticulture ==
Aubin vert is an early ripening variety that tends to produce grapes with very high acid levels.

== Wine regions ==
Aubin vert is grown almost exclusively in the Lorraine region of northeast France where it is an authorized grape variety in many of the wines produced in the Moselle, Meurthe-et-Moselle and Meuse departments.

== Synonyms ==
Over the years Aubin vert has been known under a variety of synonyms including: Aubun vert, Blanc d'Euvezin, Blanc d'Euvizin and Vert blanc.
