= Roublot =

White wine grape variety

- Grape (Vitis)
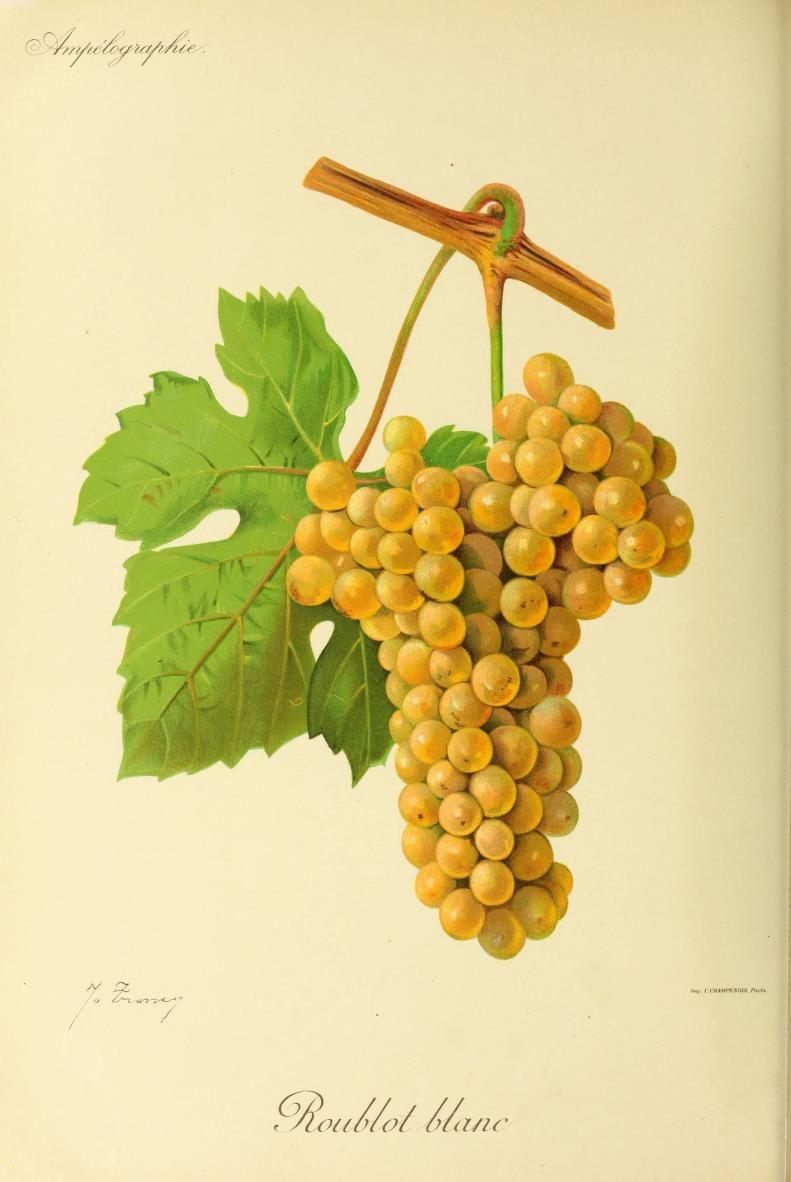
- Roublot in Viala & Vermorel
- Color of berry skin: Blanc
- Species: Vitis vinifera
- Also called: César Blanc (more)
- Origin: France
- Notable regions: Chablis
- VIVC number: 10234

Roublot is a traditional French variety of white wine grape that is a sibling of Chardonnay. It was once quite widely grown near Auxerre.

== History ==
In the early 19th century, Roublot made up a third of the area in Saint-Bris-le-Vineux in the west of Chablis. Then the vines were wiped out in the phylloxera epidemic, and uniquely for Burgundy, were replaced by Sauvignon blanc, the wines of which today are designated Saint-Bris AOC.

DNA fingerprinting has shown that Roublot is one of many grapes to be the result of a cross between Gouais blanc (Heunisch) and Pinot, making it a full sibling of famous varieties such as Chardonnay and Aligoté. Gouais blanc was widely grown by the French peasantry in the Medieval ages. This offered many opportunities for hybridization, and the offspring benefited from hybrid vigor as the parents were genetically quite different.

Other Gouais blanc/Pinot crosses include Aubin vert, Auxerrois, Bachet noir, Beaunoir, Franc Noir de la Haute-Saône, Gamay Blanc Gloriod, Gamay, Melon, Knipperlé, Peurion, Romorantin, Roublot, and Sacy.

The synonym César blanc may reflect a traditional link with the ancient red grape César, a Pinot/Argant cross.

== Viticulture ==
Like many Pinot/Gouais crosses, Roublot is quite vigorous, with small bunches. It is a very unreliable yielder, thanks to its high susceptibility to powdery mildew and grey rot.

== Wine regions ==
Roublot has just about disappeared from commercial production.

== Synonyms ==
Aubanne, César Blanc, César Femelle, L'Haubanne, Meslier, Plant De Vaux, Plant Paule, Robleau, Roblot, Roublat, Roubleau
