= Meslier =

Meslier is originally a French surname, and can refer to the following:

- People:
  - Jean Meslier (1664–1729), Catholic priest who was discovered after his death to have written a Testament attacking religion.
  - Illan Meslier (born 2000), French football goalkeeper who plays for Leeds United.
- Places:
  - Meslières, a village and commune in the Doubs département of eastern France.
- 'Wine grapes'
  - Petit Meslier, a French variety of white wine grape
  - Meslier (grape), another name for the Loire Valley grape Meslier-Saint-François
  - Meslier vert, another name for Peurion, a traditional French variety of white wine grape
  - Meslier is also a synonym for the grapes Roublot and Luglienga
- Other:
  - Asteroid 7062 is named after Jean Meslier, see Meanings of asteroid names (7001-7500).
