= Peurion =

Variety of grape

- Grape (Vitis)
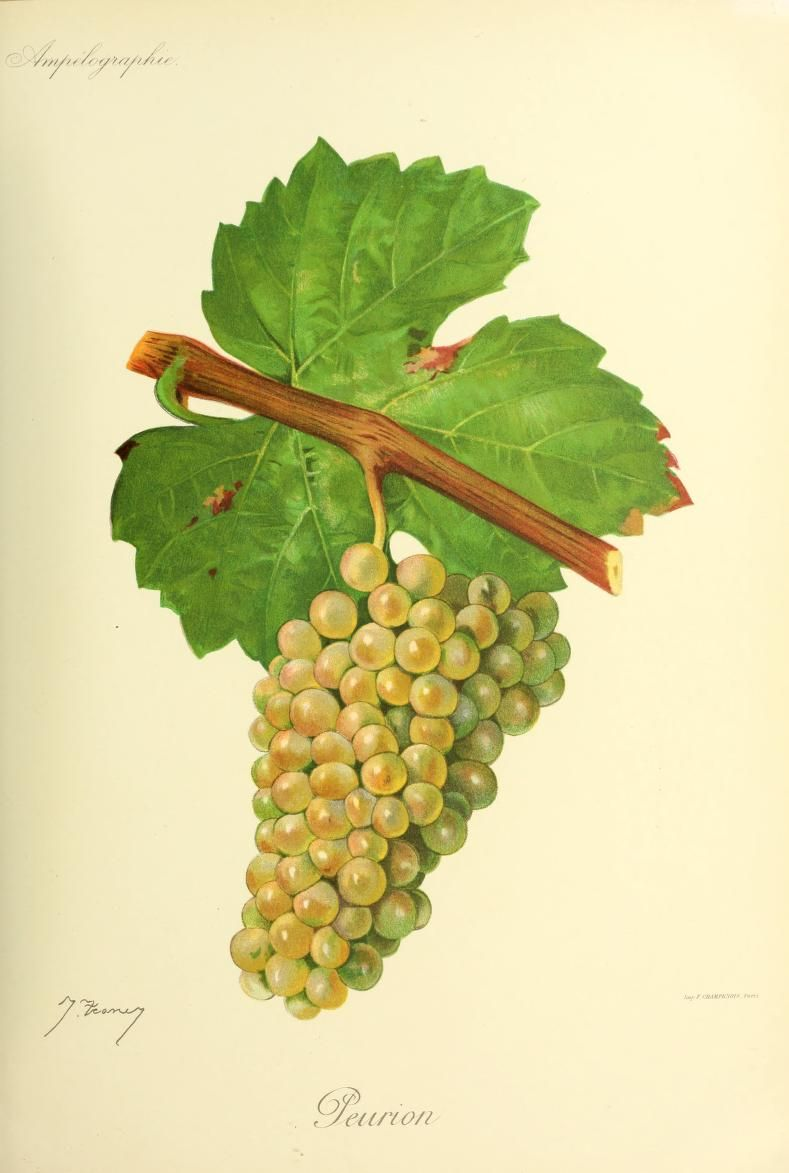
- Color of berry skin: Blanc
- Species: Vitis vinifera
- Also called: Meslier Vert (more)
- Origin: France
- Notable regions: Franche-Comté
- VIVC number: 9211

Peurion is a traditional French variety of white wine grape that is a sibling of Chardonnay. Once quite popular, not much is still grown in France these days.

== History ==
Peurion was popularized by the Augustinian monks at Langres north of Dijon and was widely grown before the phylloxera epidemic.

DNA fingerprinting has shown that it is one of many grapes to be the result of a cross between Gouais blanc (Heunisch) and Pinot, making it a full sibling of famous varieties such as Chardonnay and Aligoté. Gouais blanc was widely grown by the French peasantry in the Medieval ages. This offered many opportunities for hybridization, and the offspring benefited from hybrid vigor as the parents were genetically quite different.

Other Gouais blanc/Pinot crosses include Aubin vert, Auxerrois, Bachet noir, Beaunoir, Franc Noir de la Haute-Saône, Gamay Blanc Gloriod, Gamay, Melon, Knipperlé, Romorantin, Roublot, and Sacy.

== Viticulture ==
Like many Gouais/Pinot crosses, Peurion produces a vigorous vine with small bunches of grapes, but it is rather more reliable than most such crosses.

== Wine regions ==
What little Peurion is left can be found in Franche-Comté, but it has largely been superseded by more fashionable varieties.

== Synonyms ==
Blanc De Villemoyenne, Blanc Pinot, Co Doux, Gueuchette Blanc, Gueuchette Blanche, Lioneau, Lyonnais, Menu Blanc, Meslier Vert, Milleron, Milleron Troyen Blanc, Peurichon, Pouriette, Pourrisseux, Purion, Troyen Blanc
