= Bachet noir =

Variety of grape

Bachet N\noir
- Grape (Vitis)
- Color of berry skin: Noir
- Species: Vitis vinifera
- Also called: François noir (more)
- Origin: France
- Notable regions: Aube
- VIVC number: 858

Bachet noir (/ˈbæʃeɪ nwɑːr/) is a traditional French variety of red wine grape that is a sibling of Chardonnay. A little is still grown in the Aube, where it is used to add colour and body to Gamay wines.

== History ==
DNA fingerprinting has shown that it is one of many grapes to be the result of a cross between Gouais blanc (Heunisch) and Pinot noir, making it a sibling of famous varieties such as Chardonnay and Aligoté. Gouais blanc was widely grown by the French peasantry in the Medieval ages. This offered many opportunities for hybridization, and the offspring benefited from hybrid vigour as the parents were genetically quite different.

The fact that it is now only found in the Aube, and is descended from grapes that have been grown locally for hundreds of years, suggests that it originated to the north of Burgundy.

Other Gouais blanc/Pinot crosses include Aubin vert, Auxerrois, Beaunoir, Franc Noir de la-Haute-Saône, Gamay Blanc Gloriod, Gamay noir, Melon, Knipperlé, Peurion, Romorantin, Roublot, and Sacy

== Viticulture ==
Bachet noir has small, winged bunches of small grapes.

== Wine regions ==
Tiny amounts of Bachet noir are grown in the Aube, between Champagne and Chablis. It contributes color and body to the red wines of this northerly region.

== Synonyms ==
Bachet, Bachey, François, François Noir, François Noir De Bar-Sur-Aube, Gris Bachet
