= Saint-Pourçain AOC =

Saint-Pourçain (French pronunciation: [sɛ̃ puʁsɛ̃]) is an Appellation d'origine contrôlée (AOC) for wine located around Saint-Pourçain-sur-Sioule in the Auvergne region of France. It can alternatively be considered as an upstream satellite of the Loire wine region or as a tiny wine region in its own right. White, rosé and red wines are produced on vineyards covering 600 hectares (1,500 acres) in 19 communes of Auvergne.

== History ==
Saint-Pourçain was created as a VDQS in 1951. In 1982, the name of the VDQS was shortened from Vins de Saint-Pourçain sur Sioule to Saint-Pourçain. It was elevated to AOC status in 2009.

== Grape varieties ==
For white wines, Chardonnay and Sacy (under the local synonym Tressallier) are the main grape varieties, with Sauvignon blanc as an accessory variety.

For red wines, Gamay and Pinot noir are used. For rosé wines, only Gamay is used.
