= Luttenberger =

Luttenberger may refer to:

- Furmint, a variety of grape also known as Luttenberger
- Räuschling, a Swiss wine grape also known as Luttenberger

== People with the surname ==
- Michelle Luttenberger (born 1990), Austrian female singer and half of the duo Luttenberger*Klug
- Peter Luttenberger (born 1972), Austrian professional road bicycle racer
