= Silberweiss =

Silberweiss is a synonym for several wine grape varieties including:

- Chasselas, a white wine grape from Switzerland that is also known as Silberweissling
- Elbling, a white wine grape from Germany
- Honigler, a white wine grape from Hungary
- Ovis, a white wine grape from Hungary
- Räuschling, a white wine grape from Switzerland
- Silberweisse
- Veltliner Rotweiss, a pink-skinned wine grape
