= Bourgogne Passe-Tout-Grains AOC =

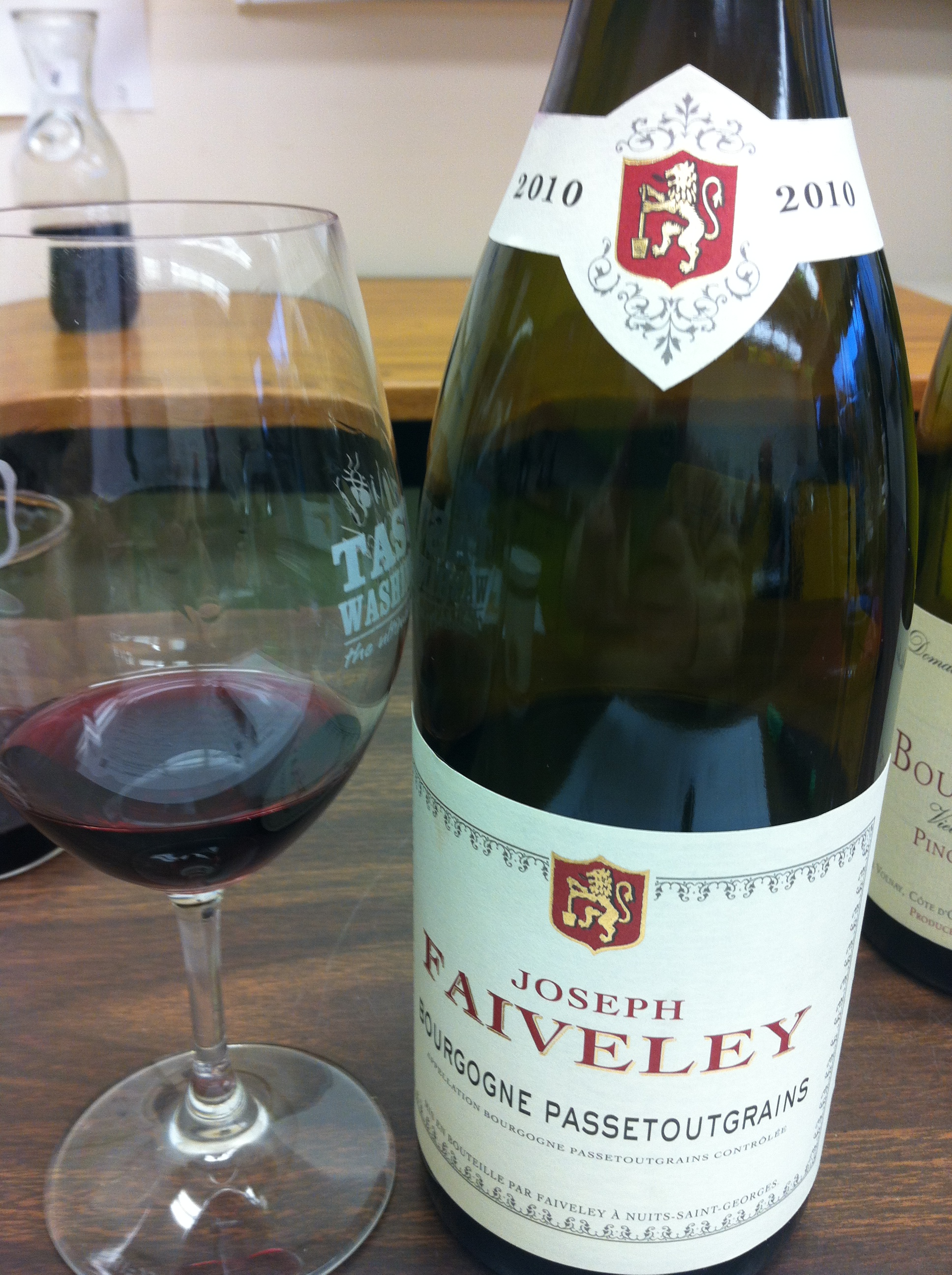
A Passe-Tout-Grains wine produced by Joseph Faiveley.

Bourgogne Passe-Tout-Grains is an Appellation d'origine contrôlée (AOC) for wine from the region of Burgundy in France. Most Bourgogne Passe-Tout-Grains, which is sometimes written unhyphenated as Bourgogne Passetoutgrains, is red although rosé wine may also be produced. Unlike other Burgundy wines, which are primarily produced from a single grape variety, Bourgogne Passe-Tout-Grains is essentially a cuvée of Gamay and Pinot noir.

== History ==
The Bourgogne Passe-Tout-Grains became a regional AOC on 31 July 1937.

== Region of production ==
Bourgogne Passe-Tout-Grains is allowed to be produced in the entire area which can use the basic Bourgogne appellation. This means 91 communes from the department of Côte d'Or, 85 communes of Rhône (not to be confused with the wine region Rhône), 154 communes of Saône et Loire region and 54 communes of Yonne.

Since Côte d'Or and Yonne have very little Gamay, most Passe-Tout-Grains are produced from grapes grown in Saône et Loire (essentially the Côte Chalonnaise subregion of Burgundy), where Gamay makes up almost half of the red grapes.

== Grape varieties ==
Bourgogne Passe-Tout-Grains must contain more than 30% Pinot noir, more than 15% Gamay, and the proportion of other allowable grapes (Chardonnay, Pinot blanc and Pinot gris) must be less than 15%. Historically the required percentages of Pinot Noir were 20% (1937-1943), 25% (1943-1947) and one third (1947-2009).

== Wine ==
The Pinot and Gamay are fermented together. This process starts with a carbonic maceration and continues with a traditional fermentation. The wine is usually released young as it is open and generous.
