= Gouais blanc =

Variety of grape

- Grape (Vitis)
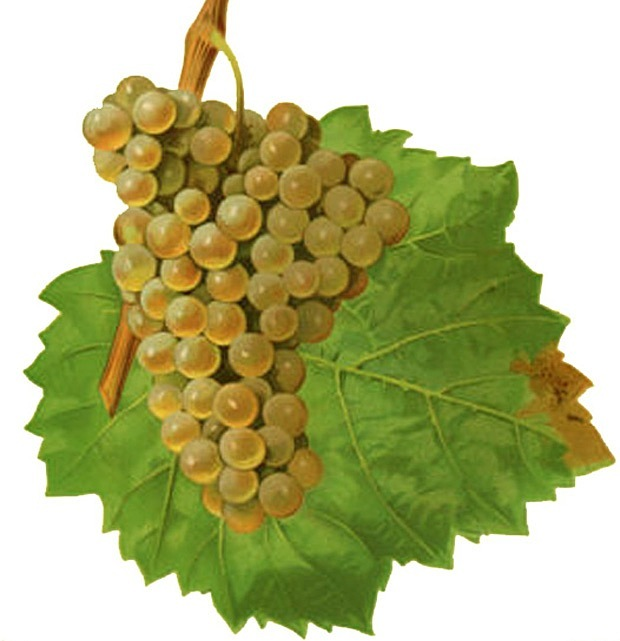
- Gouais blanc in Viala & Vermorel (as Gouget blanc)
- Color of berry skin: Blanc
- Species: Vitis vinifera
- Also called: Heunisch, Heunisch Weiss, and (other synonyms)
- Origin: Central Europe
- Notable regions: formerly Germany and northern France
- Notable wines: None, nearly extinct
- VIVC number: 5374

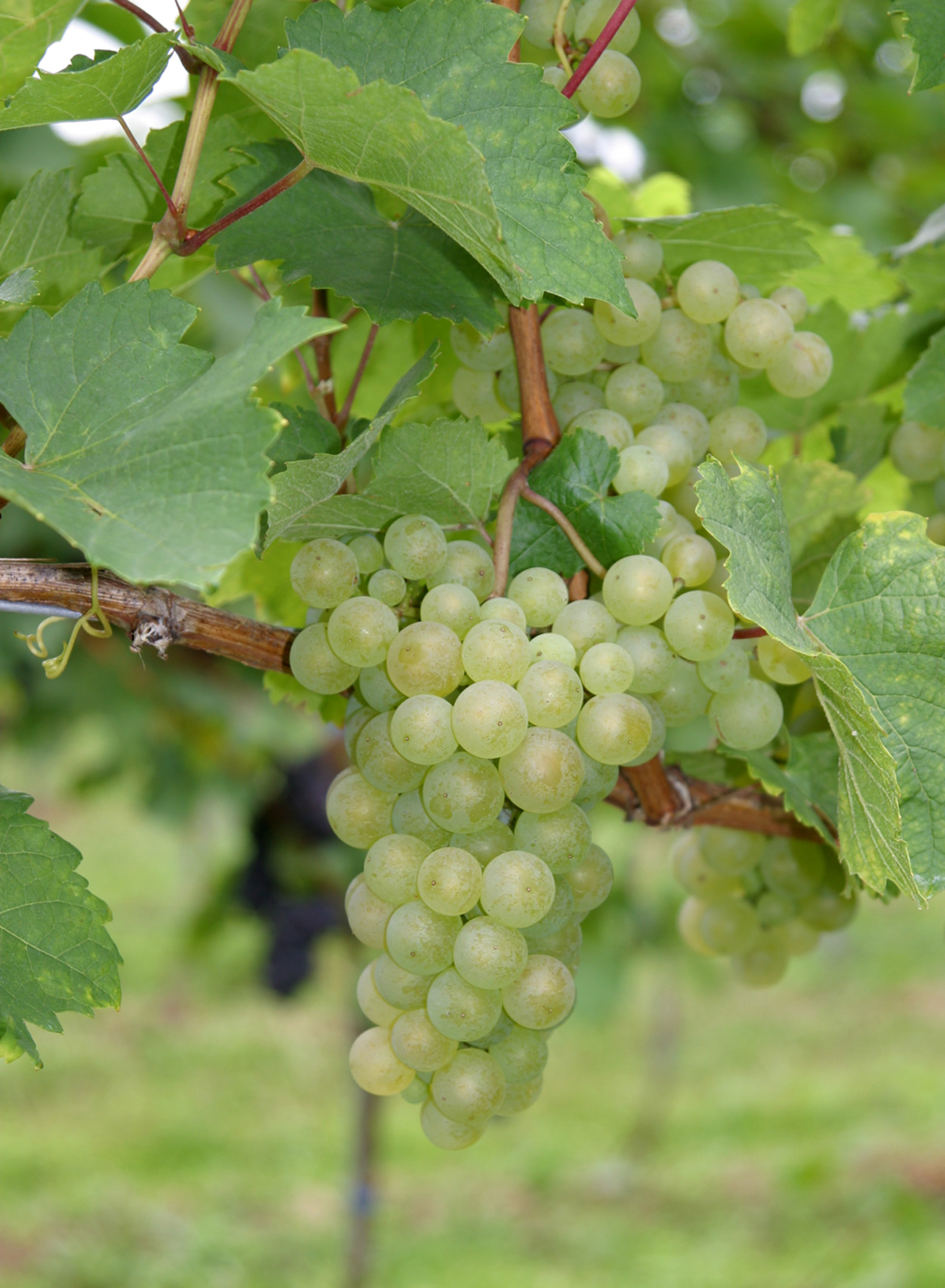
Gouais Blanc in Geisenheim, Germany

Gouais blanc (French pronunciation: [ɡu.ɛ blɑ̃]) or Weißer Heunisch (German pronunciation: [ˈvaɪsɐ ˈhɔʏnɪʃ]) is a white grape variety that is seldom grown today but is important as the ancestor of many traditional French and German grape varieties. The name Gouais derives from the old French adjective 'gou', a term of derision befitting its traditional status as the grape of the peasants. Likewise, the German name Weißer Heunisch labels it as one of the lesser "Hunnic" grapes.

== History ==
Gouais is known to have been widely planted in central and northeastern France in medieval times. At that time, it was used to produce simple, acidic, white wines, and was primarily grown in unfavourable plots less well-suited for the more highly regarded Pinot noir or Pinot gris. Gouais Blanc was thus the grape of the peasantry rather than of the nobility.

Its history before medieval times is not known with any certainty, but is the subject of much conjecture, similar to many other grape varieties with a long history. Gouais blanc has been proposed as a candidate for the grape given to the Gauls by Marcus Aurelius Probus (Roman Emperor 276–282), who was from Pannonia and who overturned Domitian's decree banning grape growing north of the Alps. Another hypothesis claims it originates specifically in Croatia (or Pannonia), but the Vitis International Variety Catalogue currently lists it as originating from Austria, which should probably be interpreted as "likely to originate somewhere in Central Europe".

Gouais blanc was also grown in the Jura, but the phylloxera epidemic wiped out the variety in France, and it now survives only in the INRA collection at Domaine de Vassal, Montpellier.

DNA fingerprinting at the University of California, Davis, in the late 1990s, identified Gouais blanc as the ancestor of a large number of classical European grape varieties. That came as something of a surprise, given the old division into Frankish and Hunnic grape varieties used in the Germanic world, because it meant that the prototype simple "Hunnic" grape was in fact an ancestor to most of the noble "Frankish" grapes.

== Crosses and relationships to other grapes ==
Having been widely grown in proximity to Pinot, the two varieties had many opportunities to cross. In fact, recent research has uncovered that Gouais blanc is closely related to Pinot noir, possibly one of Pinot's progeny, suggesting that many of the great grapes of Europe resulting from Pinot and Gouais blanc crosses are in fact highly inbred. This unique combination of events means that many grape varieties today have Gouais blanc as a parent, the most famous of which is Chardonnay.

DNA fingerprinting research at the University of California, Davis has also identified Gouais blanc as an ancestor of the Aligoté, Aubin vert, Auxerrois, Bachet noir, Beaunoir, Blaufränkisch, Franc Noir de la-Haute-Saône, Gamay Blanc Gloriod, Gamay noir, Melon de Bourgogne, Knipperlé, Peurion, Roublot, and Sacy grape varieties. Dameron is another result of the same cross, whereas a cross with Pinot fin teinturier produced Romorantin.

It produced Räuschling, Petit Meslier and Aubin when pollinated by Traminer/Savagnin, and Riesling and Elbling when pollinated by a cross of a wild grape with Traminer.

When pollinated by Chenin blanc it produced Colombard, Balzac blanc and Meslier Saint François, and with Bastardo (Tressot) it produced Genouillet.

Despite Gouais blanc having the synonym Enfarine blanc, the Jura wine grape Enfariné noir (which is also known as Gouais noir) is not a color mutation of Gouais blanc.

One of the synonyms of Gouais blanc is Gouget blanc and DNA analysis has suggested that the Allier wine grape Gouget noir may be related to Gouais blanc.

== Wine regions ==
As mentioned above, the Gouais blanc variety has, until recently, survived mostly as a museum curiosity. Since the Middle Ages there have been regular attempts to ban the peasants' grape from the soils of France, which probably says something about its typical winemaking qualities. However, Gouais blanc has continued to be commercially grown at several vineyards in Switzerland and in recent years, a few historically interested wine producers have started to plant small amounts of Gouais blanc. The first North American commercial planting of Gouais was in 2019 at Pamar Vineyard in the Van Duzer Corridor AVA of Oregon's Willamette Valley. The wine is being made at Björnson Vineyard and will be released in 2023. Gouais has also been grown for over 100 years by Chambers Rosewood Winery in Rutherglen, Australia.

== Synonyms ==
Gouais blanc is also known under the following synonyms: Absenger, Bauernweinbeer, Bauernweinbeere Weiss, Bauernweintraube, Debela, Drobna, Best's N°4, Blanc De Serres, Boarde, Bogatyur, Bon Blanc, Bordenauer, Borzenauer, Bouillan, Bouillaud, Bouilleaud, Bouillen, Bouillenc, Bourgeois, Bourguignon, Branestraube, Branne, Burgegger Weiss, Burger, Cagnas, Cagnou, Champagner Langstielig, Colle, Coulis, Dickweisser, Dickwiss, Enfarine Blanc, Esslinger, Figuier, Foirard Blanc, Frankenthaler, Gau, Gauche Blanc, Geuche Blanc, Goe, Goet, Gohet, Goi, Goin, Goix, Got, Gouai, Gouais Jaune, Gouais Long, Gouais Rond, Gouas, Gouaulx, Gouay, Gouche, Gouche Blanche, Goue, Gouest, Gouest Sauge, Gouet Blanc, Gouette, Gouge, Gouget Blanc, Gouillaud, Gouis De Mardeuil, Gousse, Grauhuensch, Grobe, Grobes, Grobheunisch, Grobweine, Grobweisse, Gros Blanc, Grünling, Guay Jaune, Gueche Blanc, Guest Salviatum, Gueuche Blanc, Guillan, Guinlan, Guy, Guy Blanc, Gwaess, Harthuensch, Hartuensch, Heinisch, Heinish, Heinsch, Heinschen Weiss, Hennische Weiss, Hensch, Heunisch Blanc, Heunisch Weisser, Heunischtraube, Heunish Weiss, Heunsch, Heunscher, Heunschler, Heunschlir, Hinschen, Hinschene, Hintsch, Huensch, Huenschene, Huentsch, Hunnentraube, Hunsch, Hunschrebe, Huntsch, Hyntsch, Issal, Issol, Kleinbeer, Kleinberger, Laxiertraube, Lombard Blanc, Luxiertraube, Mehlweisse, Mehlweisse Gruen, Mendic, Moreau Blanc, Mouillet, Nargouet, Pendrillart Blanc, Petit Gouge, Pichons, Plant De Sechex, Plant Madame, Plant Seche, President, Regalaboue, Riesling Grob, Rous Hette, Roussaou Blanc, Rudeca Saboule Boey, Sadoule Boey, Sadoulo Bouyer, Seestock Grob, Tejer Szozeloe, Thalburger, Trompe Bouvier, Trompe Valet, Verdet, Verdin Blanc, Vionnier, Weisse Traube, Weisser Heunisch, Weissgrobe, Weissheinsch, Weissstock, Weisstock, Wippacher, Zoeld Hajnos
