= Räuschling =

Variety of grape

- Grape (Vitis)
- Color of berry skin: Blanc
- Species: Vitis vinifera
- Also called: Drutsch, Großer Traminer
- Origin: Germany
- Notable regions: Switzerland
- VIVC number: 9874

Räuschling is a white variety of grape used for wine. It is today almost only found in small amounts in German-speaking parts of Switzerland, where Räuschling can produce fruity, crisp white wines with good acidity. Räuschling has previously been much more common in Switzerland, Germany and Alsace. Before the widespread planting of Müller-Thurgau, Räuschling and Elbling were the most common grape varieties in Switzerland. German plantations were found in Franconia, Palatinate and Württemberg, as well as in Baden in medieval times. It is also thought to have been the grape variety of the early wines traded from Tramin, with Großer Traminer being one of its synonyms.

The name of the variety is supposed to derive from the robust leaf canopy of Räuschling vines which make noise - "rauschen" in German - in strong wind. However, the name Reuschling first appeared in the vineyard ordnance (Weingartordnung) issued in 1614 by Count Philipp Ernst zu Hohenlohe-Neuenstein. In the herbals written by Hieronymus Bock in the 16th century, it is referred to as Drutsch or Drutscht.

The name Großer Räuschling has been used to differentiate it from the variety Knipperlé, which was previously common in Alsace and which is also called Kleiner Räuschling. Räuschling and Knipperlé are thought to be closely related.

DNA profiling has revealed Räuschling to be a cross between Gouais blanc (Weißer Heunisch) and a vine of the Pinot family.

== Synonyms ==
Synonyms of Räuschling are Brauner Nürnberger, Brauner Würnberger, Buchelin, Deutsche Trauben, Divicina, Divizhna, Divizhna Vizhna, Dretsch, Drötsch, Drutsch, Dünnelbling, Erjava Tizhna, Frankentraube, Furmentin, Gros Fendant, Großfränkisch, Großer Räuschling, Großer Röuschling, Großer Traminer, Grünspat, Guay Jaune, Heinzler, Klaffer, Klöpfer, Luttenberger, Luttenbergerstock, Luttenbershna, Lyonnaise, Offenburger, Padebecker, Pfäffling, Pfaffentraube, Reuschling, Röschling, Rössling, Ruchelin, Ruschling, Rüschlig, Rüschling, Rüssling, Silberräuschling, Silberweiß, Szrebrobella, Thuner, Thunerrebe, Vigne de Zuri, Weißer Dünnelbling, Weißer Kläpfer, Weißer Lagrein, Weißer Räuschling, Weißwelsch, Weißwelscher, Welsche, Zürirebe, Zürichrebe, Züriweiss and Züriwiss.
