= Auxerrois blanc =

Variety of grape

- Grape (Vitis)
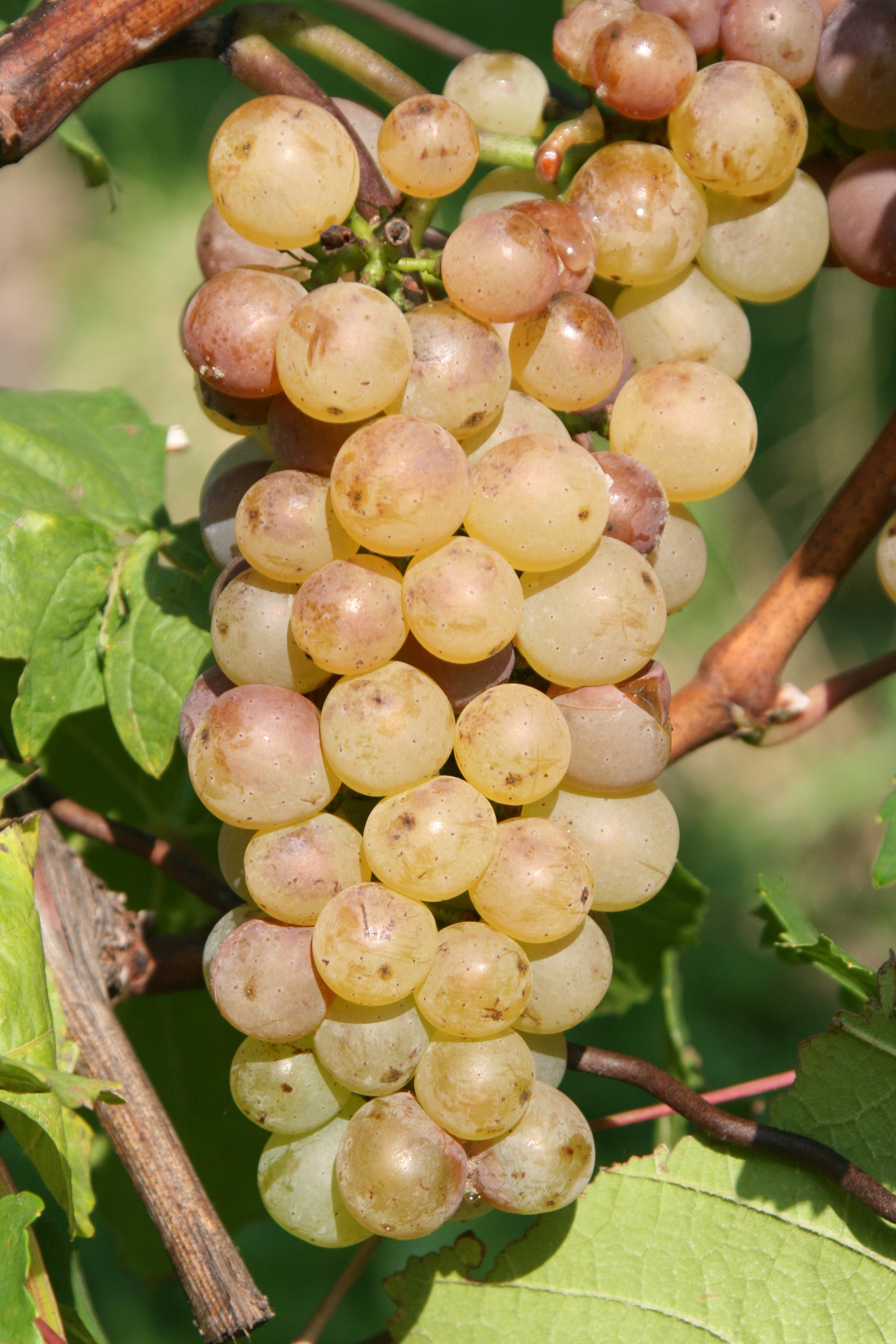
- Auxerrois in Weinsberg, Germany
- Color of berry skin: Blanc
- Species: Vitis vinifera
- Also called: Auxerrois, Pinot Auxerrois (more)
- Origin: France
- Notable regions: Alsace
- VIVC number: 792

Auxerrois blanc (pronounced [o.sɛ.ʁwa blɑ̃]) or Auxerrois Blanc de Laquenexy is a white wine grape prevalent in the French region of Alsace, and is also grown in neighbouring Germany and Luxembourg. It is a full sibling of Chardonnay that is often blended with the similar Pinot blanc.

== History ==
Auxerrois blanc is thought to have originated in Lorraine, rather than near Auxerre in the Yonne. Recent DNA fingerprinting suggests that it is a cross between Gouais blanc and Pinot, the same ancestry as Chardonnay. The name Auxerrois blanc has been used as a synonym for Chardonnay in the Moselle region in France, which may explain why there is also a longer name (Auxerrois Blanc de Laquenexy) for the grape variety.

== Distribution and Wines ==
Auxerrois blanc is seldom seen in the Americas, though is somewhat grown in North America and South Africa.

=== France ===
France's 1,950 hectares (4,800 acres) of Auxerrois blanc are mostly in Alsace, with some in the Côtes de Toul of Lorraine. It is mostly blended into wines called "Pinot blanc" (which may actually consist of Auxerrois blanc, the variety Pinot blanc, Pinot gris and Pinot noir vinified white). It is an important component of Crémant d'Alsace.

=== Germany and Luxembourg ===
In Germany and Luxembourg, it is known simply as Auxerrois. In Germany, 218 hectares (539 acres) were grown in 2012, mainly in the states of Rhineland-Palatinate (135 hectares (334 acres)) and Baden-Württemberg (72 hectares (178 acres)). The main growing areas were Baden (wine region)(71 hectares (175 acres)) and Palatinate (wine region) (69 hectares (171 acres)).

=== United States ===
There are only six vineyards known to grow Auxerrois blanc in Oregon: Bjornson Vineyard; Zenith Vineyard, Russell-Grooters Vineyard on Savannah Ridge (Carlton Cellars), Sunnyside Vineyard, and Havlin Vineyard. David Adelsheim was influential in introducing Auxerrois to Oregon in the 1990s but has since replanted the historic vineyard from which cuttings were taken to propagate some of the current plantings, such as at Bjornson Vineyard. Chateau Fontaine and Boathouse Vineyards grow Auxerrois on the Leelanau peninsula in Michigan Bel Lago Vineyards and Winery, located on the Leelanau Peninsula of Michigan, introduced Auxerrois to Michigan in 1987. Free Run Cellars in Berrien county, Michigan (southwest MI), is now producing it (2018). Island View Orchard planted Auxerrois on Old Mission Peninsula in Traverse City, Michigan in 2016, and it is made at Left Foot Charley. Hidden Arbor Farm in Beulah, Benzie County, Michigan (northwest MI), planted Auxerrois in 2019. Heart & Hands Vineyard located on the East side of Cayuga Lake in the village of Union Springs, New York. Started growing Auxerrois in 2015, with a first vintage in 2019. Heart & Hands.

=== Canada ===
In Canada, Auxerrois is grown on Vancouver Island in British Columbia where Alderlea Vineyards blends it with Ortega (Another cold climate grape, grown in Dragonfly Hill Vineyard) and Pinot Gris. It is also produced as a varietal wine in the Okanagan wine country by five or six different producers, most notably Gray Monk Vineyards, just north of Kelowna, who were responsible for bringing the grape over from Alsace in the 1970s. In Ontario, the Essex Region wineries Viewpointe Estate and Oxley Estate produce varietal Auxerrois, and Pelee Island Winery blends Auxerrois with Chardonnay. Château des Charmes winery was the first to plant Auxerrois in the mid 1980s.

=== United Kingdom ===
A few vineyards in the United Kingdom grow Auxerrois, notably Davenport Vineyards, Danebury Vineyard, Wyken Vineyards and a'Becketts Vineyard. Auxerrois is used to produce both still and sparkling wines, and is often blended with other varieties. Despite success with this grape variety for the production of sparkling wines, Auxerrois is not included in the UK quality sparkling wine PDO scheme..

== Vine and Viticulture ==
It favours limestone soils, and ripens a little earlier than Pinot blanc. It has small compact bunches.

== Synonyms ==
Arboisier, Arnaison blanc, Arnoison, Aubaine, Auvergnat blanc, Auvernas blanc, Auvernat blanc, Auxois blanc, Bargeois blanc, Beaunois, Blanc De Champagne, Breisgauer Sussling, Burgundi Feher, Chablis, Chardennet, Chardonnay blanc, Chatey Petit, Chaudenet, Claevner, Clevner Weiss, Epinette blanche, Epinette De Champagne, Ericey blanc, Feher Chardonnay, Feherburgundi, Feinburgunder, Gamay blanc, Gelber Weissburgunder, Gentil blanc, Grosse Bourgogne, Klawner, Klevanjka Biela, Lisant, Luisant, Luizannais, Luizant, Luzannois, Maconnais, Maurillon blanc, Melon blanc, Melon D'Arbois, Moreau blanc, Morillon blanc, Moulon, Noirien blanc, Petit Chatey, Petit Sainte-marie, Pino Shardone, Pinot Blanc A Cramant, Pinot Blanc Chardonnay, Pinot Chardonnay, Plant De Tonnerre, Romere, Romeret, Rouci Bile, Rousseau, Roussot, Rulander Weiss, Sainte Marie Petite, Sardone, Shardone, Weiss Silber, Weissedler, Auxerrois blanc de Laquenexy and Auxerrois de Laquenexy.

== See also ==
- Pinot gris - known as Auxerrois gris
