= Sacy (grape) =

Variety of grape

- Grape (Vitis)
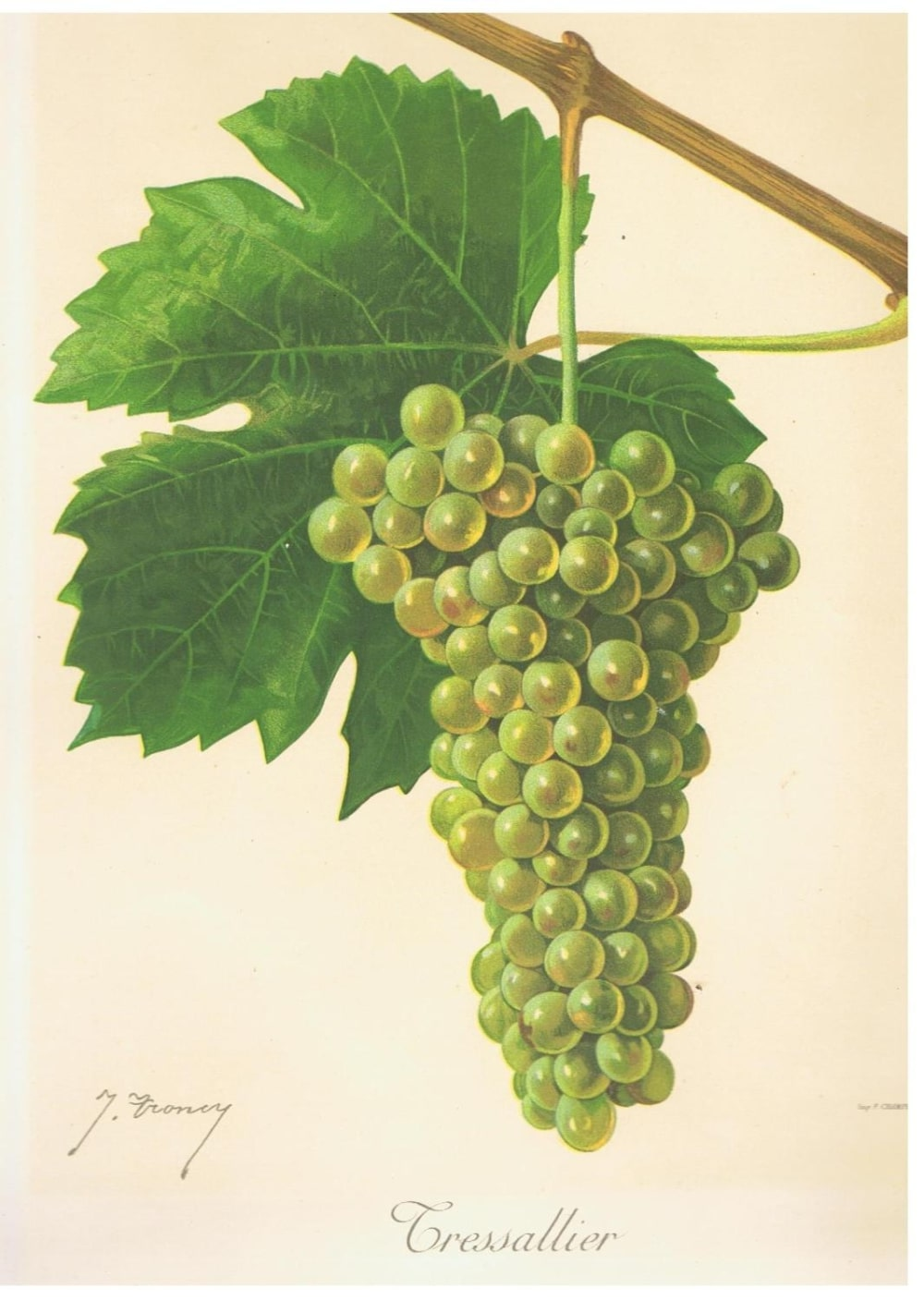
- Sacy in Viala & Vermorel
- Color of berry skin: Blanc
- Species: Vitis vinifera
- Also called: Tresallier (more)
- Origin: France
- Notable regions: Central and northeastern France
- Notable wines: Saint-Pourçain
- VIVC number: 10450

Sacy is a white wine grape grown primarily in the central and northeastern France within the Yonne and Allier départments.

Sacy ripens early, and produces light-coloured wines low in acid and alcohol.

== Parentage ==
DNA typing has revealed Sacy to be a cross between Pinot and Gouais blanc. The DNA typing does not allow the identification of which Pinot variety (such as Pinot noir or Pinot gris) that was the parent. Sacy is one of a large number of French grape varieties sharing this parentage. This finding calls into question the older assumption that the grape variety would have originated in Italy, although it does not completely rule it out.

== History ==
The grape's origins have been assumed to be Italy, where it is supposed to have been brought to Burgundy some time in the thirteenth century by monks of the Reigny Abbey. The vine's high yields and productivity made it a popular plant that soon led to overproduction in neighboring areas. In 1732, the Parliaments of nearby Besançon and Vermonton banned any additional plantings. The grape continued to be produced in the Yonne department where it was used as a blending component in Crémant de Bourgogne wines from Auxerrois and as a blending partner with Aligoté and, to a lesser extent, Chardonnay.

== Regions ==
In the northern Rhône Valley and in the Auvergne region, the grape is known as Tresallier and is often blended with Sauvignon blanc to form a tart white wine. Today, Saint-Pourçain in the upper Loire Valley is the only French appellation to include Sacy in its blend. In Saint-Pourçain, blending of Sacy and Chardonnay is mandatory, and some Sauvignon blanc may also be included.

== Synonyms ==
Sacy is known under the following synonyms: Aligoté vert, Blanc de Pays, Blanc Moulin, Blanc vert, Fairené, Farié, Farinier blanc, Ferné, Fernet, Ferney, Gros blanc, Menu blanc, Peut blanc, Pivoine, Plant d'Essert, Plant de Sacy, Sassy, Souche, Terzari, Tres Sailier, Tresalier, Tresallier, Tressaillier, Tressalier, Tressallier, Trezaguier, Trezailhi, Trezali, Trezari, and Weissklemmer.
