= Melon de Bourgogne =

Variety of grape

- Grape (Vitis)
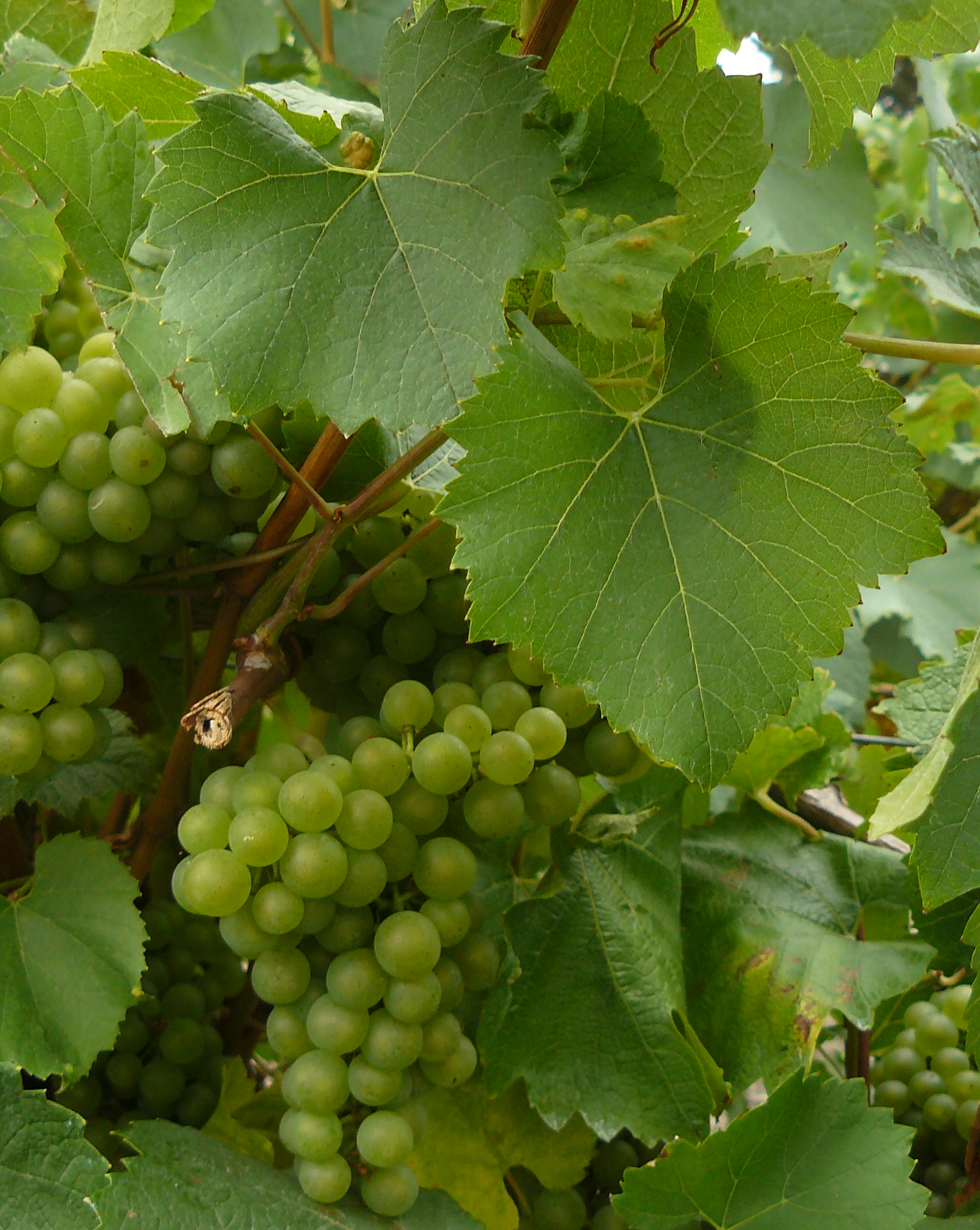
- Melon de Bourgogne grapes
- Color of berry skin: Blanc
- Species: Vitis vinifera
- Also called: Melon; (other names)
- Origin: France
- Notable regions: Loire Valley, Oregon, Washington, Southern Ontario
- Notable wines: Muscadet
- VIVC number: 7615

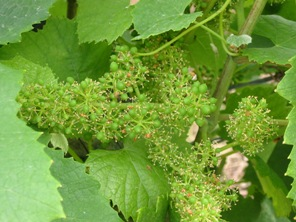
Melon de Bourgogne grapes during flowering.

Melon de Bourgogne (French pronunciation: [məlɔ̃ də buʁɡɔɲ]) or Melon ([məlɔ̃]) is a variety of white grape grown primarily in the Loire Valley region of France. It is also grown in North America. It is best known through its use in the white wine Muscadet.

In the U.S., Federal law prevents "Muscadet" from being used for American-produced wine; only the full name of the grape, or the shortened "Melon" can be used.

== History ==
As its name suggests, the grape originated in Burgundy and was grown there until its destruction was ordered in the early 18th century. In the vineyards around Nantes and the western Loire, however, the harsh winter of 1709 destroyed so many vines that a new variety was needed, and the Melon grape was introduced. Since then, it has been used solely in the production of the light dry white wine Muscadet, which is made entirely from the Melon grape. The grape is so associated with its appellation that the grape itself is often known as Muscadet.

DNA analysis has revealed Melon de Bourgogne to be a cross between Pinot blanc and Gouais blanc.

== North America ==
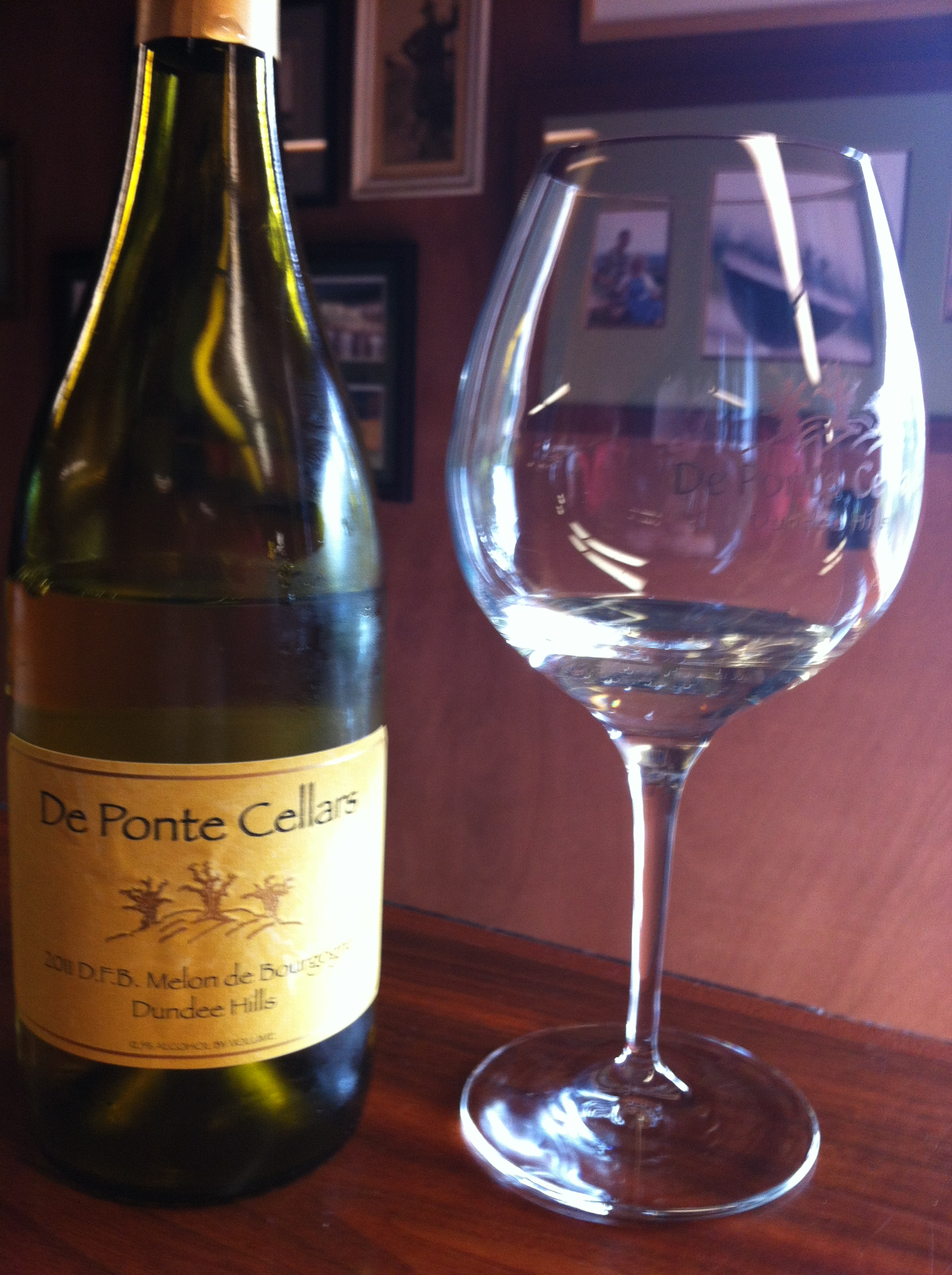
A Melon de Bourgogne from the Dundee Hills AVA of Oregon.

This grape was brought to America in 1939. It was propagated incorrectly as Pinot Blanc from the 1960s into the early 1980s.

As of 2007, the grape is grown in Oregon, where it is known simply as Melon. The grape has been introduced into Washington by Perennial Vintners on Bainbridge Island, six miles across Puget Sound from Seattle.

== Synonyms ==
Melon de Bourgogne is known by many synonyms, including:

- Auxerrois GrosBiaune
- Blanc de Nantes
- Bourgogne blanche
- Bourgogne verde
- Bourgogne verte
- Bourguignon blanc
- Clozier
- Feher Nagyburgundi
- Feuille Ronde
- Gamay blanc
- Gamay Blanc à Feuilles Rondes
- Gamay Blanc Feuilles Rondes
- Game Kruglolistnyi
- Gros Auxerrois
- Gros blanc
- Grosse Saint Marie
- Lyonnais
- Lyonnaise blanche
- Malin blanc
- Mele
- Melon
- Meurlon
- Mourlon
- Muscadet
- Perry
- Petit Bourgogne
- Petit Muscadet
- Petite Biaune
- Petoin
- Petouin
- Picarneau
- Plant de Lons-Le-Saulnie
- Roussette Basse
- Später Weisser Burgunder
