= Pinot (grape) =

Variety of grape

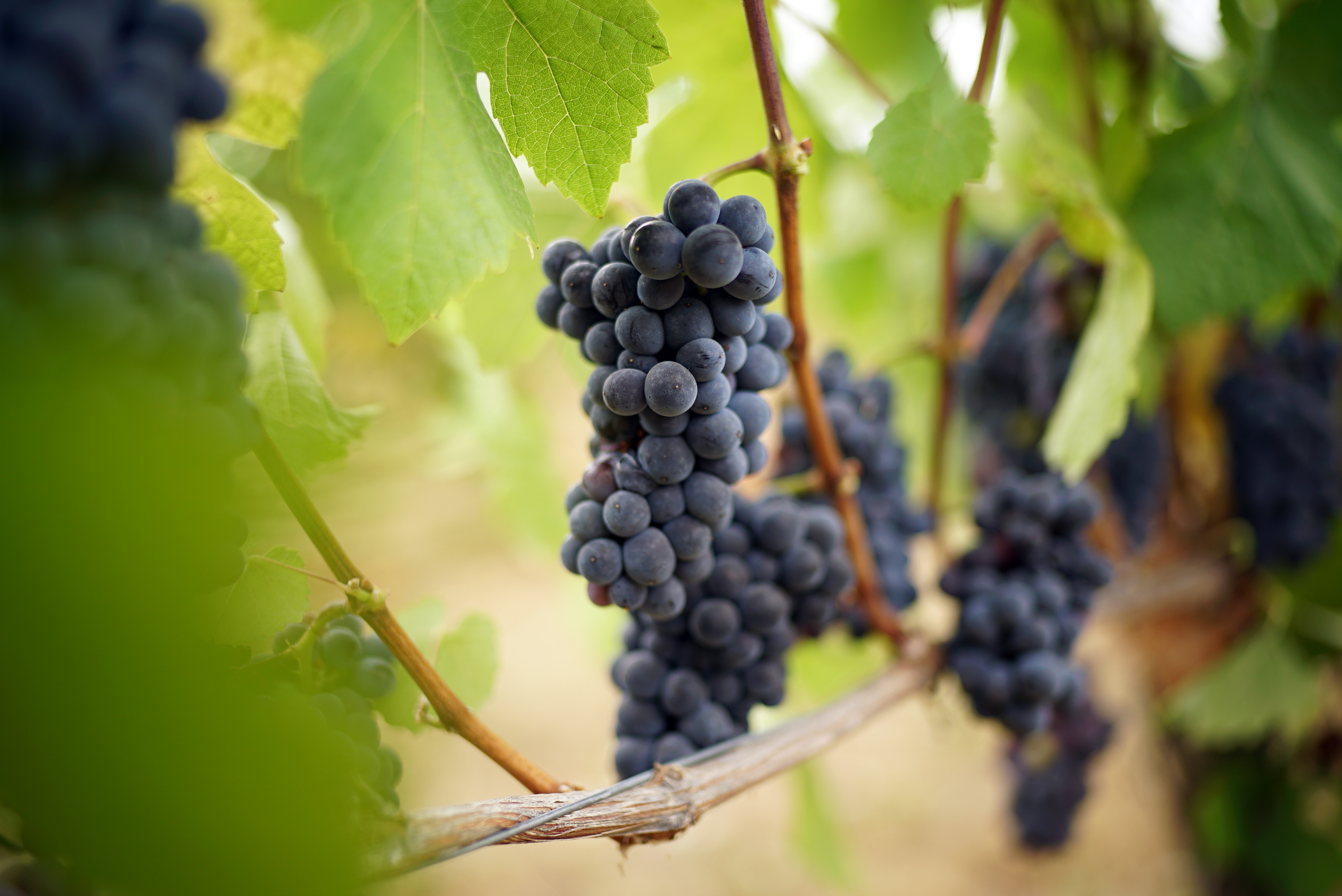
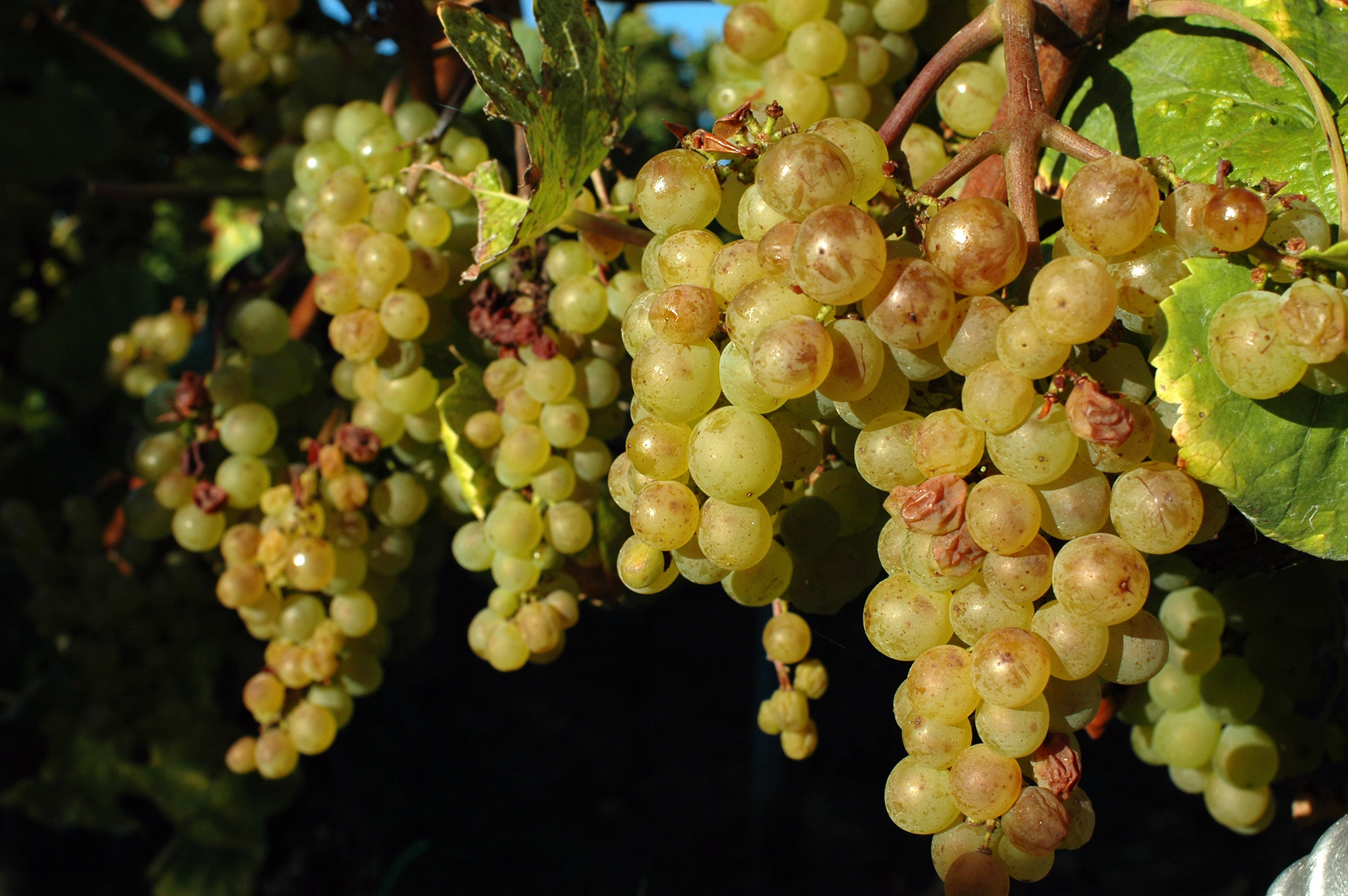
Pinot Noir (top) and Pinot Blanc

Pinot (pronounced /ˈpiːnoʊ, piˈnoʊ/) is a Burgundian grape family.

== Wine grape varieties in the Pinot family ==
- Pinot blanc (Pinot bianco, Weißburgunder)
- Pinot gris (Pinot grigio, Grauburgunder)
- Pinot Meunier (Schwarzriesling)
- Pinot noir (Spätburgunder, Pinot nero)
- Pinot Noir Précoce (Frühburgunder)

== Biochemistry ==
Red-berried Pinot vines are known to not synthesize acetylated or para-coumaroylated anthocyanins, as other grape varieties do, only glucosylated anthocyanins.

== See also ==
- Terret (grape), a grape vine like Pinot that has mutated into several sub-varieties
