= Raeva =

Raeva is a surname. Notable people with the surname include:

- Alexandra Raeva (born 1992), Russian curler
- Bilyana Raeva (born 1973), Bulgarian politician
- Iliana Raeva (born 1963), Bulgarian gymnast

== See also ==
- Rava (disambiguation)
