= South Carolina wine =

South Carolina
- Wine region
- Official name: State of South Carolina
- Type: U.S. State Appellation
- Year established: 1788
- Country: United States
- Total area: 34,726 square miles (22,224,640 acres)
- Grapes produced: Blanc du Bois, Cabernet Sauvignon, Cayuga, Chambourcin, Chardonnay, Melody, Merlot, Muscadine, Sauvignon Blanc, Seyval Blanc, Suwannee, Ravat, Vignoles, Viognier
- No. of wineries: 12

South Carolina wine refers to wine made from grapes grown in the U.S. state of South Carolina. The climate of South Carolina is challenging for the production of wine grapes. Hot and humid summers require viticulturists to adapt their canopy management to minimize direct sunlight on the grapes, which are often harvested early in the summer. There are twelve wineries in South Carolina and no designated American Viticulture Areas.
