= Chardonnay =

Variety of grape mainly used to make wine

- Grape (Vitis)
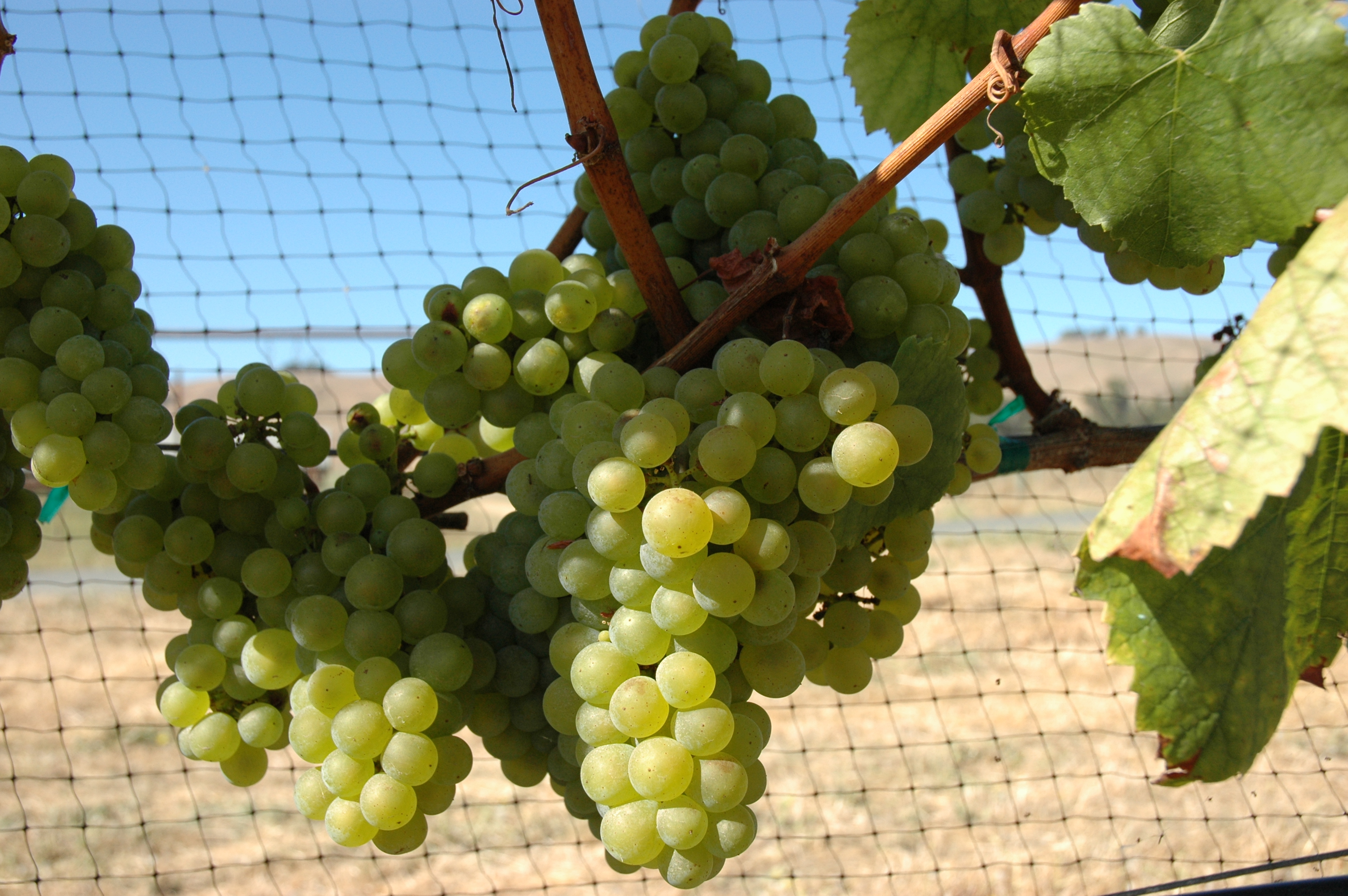
- Chardonnay grapes
- Color of berry skin: White
- Also called: Aubaine, Beaunois, Gamay blanc, Melon blanc (more)
- Notable regions: Worldwide
- Notable wines: Chablis, white Burgundy, Champagne, Italian Franciacorta
- Ideal soil: Chalk, limestone
- Hazards: Millerandage, powdery mildew, frost and coulure
- VIVC number: 2455

Wine characteristics
- Cool climate: Lean, crisp, high acidity
- Medium climate: Honey, tropical fruit

Chardonnay (UK: /ˈʃɑːrdəneɪ/, US: /ˌʃɑːrdənˈeɪ/; French: [ʃaʁdɔnɛ]) is a green-skinned grape variety used in the production of white wine. The variety originated in the Burgundy wine region of east-central France, but is now grown wherever wine is produced, from England to New Zealand. For new and developing wine regions, growing Chardonnay is seen as a 'rite of passage' and an easy entry into the international wine market.

The Chardonnay grape itself is neutral, with many of the flavors commonly associated with the wine being derived from such influences as terroir and oak. It is vinified in many different styles, from the lean, crisp mineral wines of Chablis, France, to New World wines with oak and tropical fruit flavors. In cool climates, Chardonnay wine tends to be medium to light body with noticeable acidity and flavors of green plum, apple, and pear. Examples of cool-climate growing regions include Chablis, the Willamette Valley of Oregon, and the Carneros AVA of California. Chardonnay is also grown in the cool climate of New Zealand's Waitaki Valley. In warmer locations (such as the Adelaide Hills and Mornington Peninsula in Australia and Gisborne and Marlborough region of New Zealand), the flavors become more citrus, peach, and melon, while in very warm locations, more fig and tropical fruit notes such as banana and mango come out. Wines that have gone through malolactic fermentation tend to have softer acidity and fruit flavors with buttery mouthfeel and hazelnut notes.

Chardonnay is an important component of many sparkling wines around the world, including Champagne and Franciacorta in Italy. Chardonnay's popularity peaked in the late 1980s, then gave way to a backlash among those wine connoisseurs who saw the grape as a leading negative component of the globalization of wine. Nonetheless, it is one of the most widely planted grape varieties, with 210,000 hectares (520,000 acres) worldwide, second only to Airén among white wine grapes and fifth among all wine grapes.

== History ==
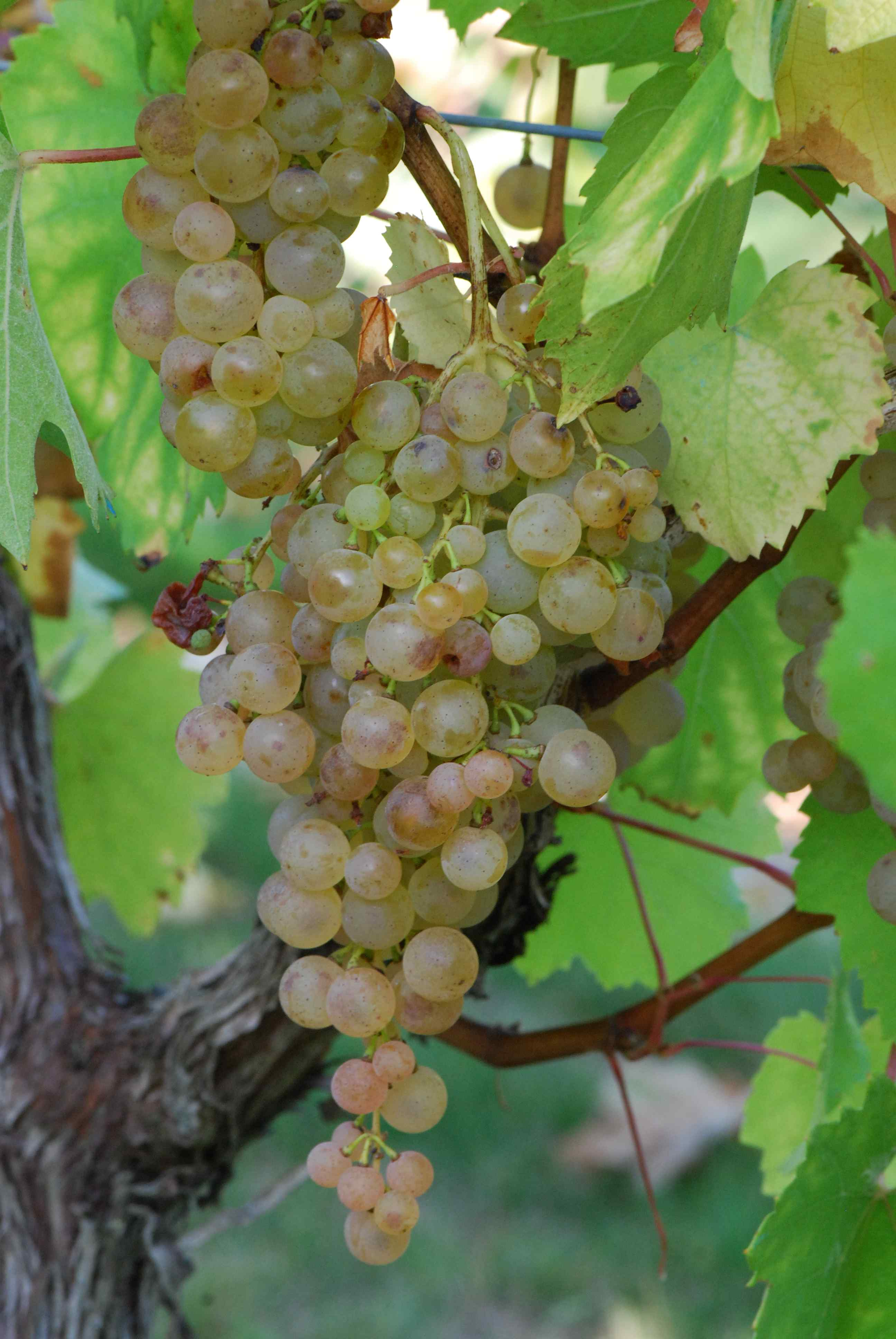
Gouais blanc, one of the parent varieties of Chardonnay

For much of its history, a connection was assumed between Chardonnay and Pinot noir or Pinot blanc. In addition to being found in the same region of France for centuries, ampelographers noted that the leaves of these plants have near-identical shape and structure. Pierre Galet disagreed with this assessment, believing that Chardonnay was unrelated to any other major grape variety. Viticulturalists Maynard Amerine and Harold Olmo proposed descent from a wild Vitis vinifera vine that was a step removed from white Muscat. Chardonnay's true origins were further obscured by vineyard owners in Lebanon and Syria, who claimed that the grape's ancestry could be traced to the Middle East, from where it was introduced to Europe by returning Crusaders. Little external evidence supports this theory. Another theory stated that it originated from an ancient indigenous vine found in Cyprus.

Modern DNA fingerprinting research at University of California, Davis, now suggests that Chardonnay is the result of a cross between the Pinot noir and Gouais blanc (Heunisch) grape varieties. The Romans are thought to have brought Gouais blanc from Croatia, and it was widely cultivated by peasants in eastern France.

The Pinot of the French aristocracy grew in close proximity to the Gouais blanc, giving the two ample opportunity to interbreed. Since the two parents were genetically distant, many of the crosses showed hybrid vigour and were selected for further propagation. These "successful" crosses included Chardonnay and siblings such as Aligoté, Aubin vert, Auxerrois, Bachet noir, Beaunoir, Franc Noir de la-Haute-Saône, Gamay Blanc Gloriod, Gamay noir, Melon, Knipperlé, Peurion, Roublot, Sacy, and Dameron.

=== Clones, crossing, and mutations ===
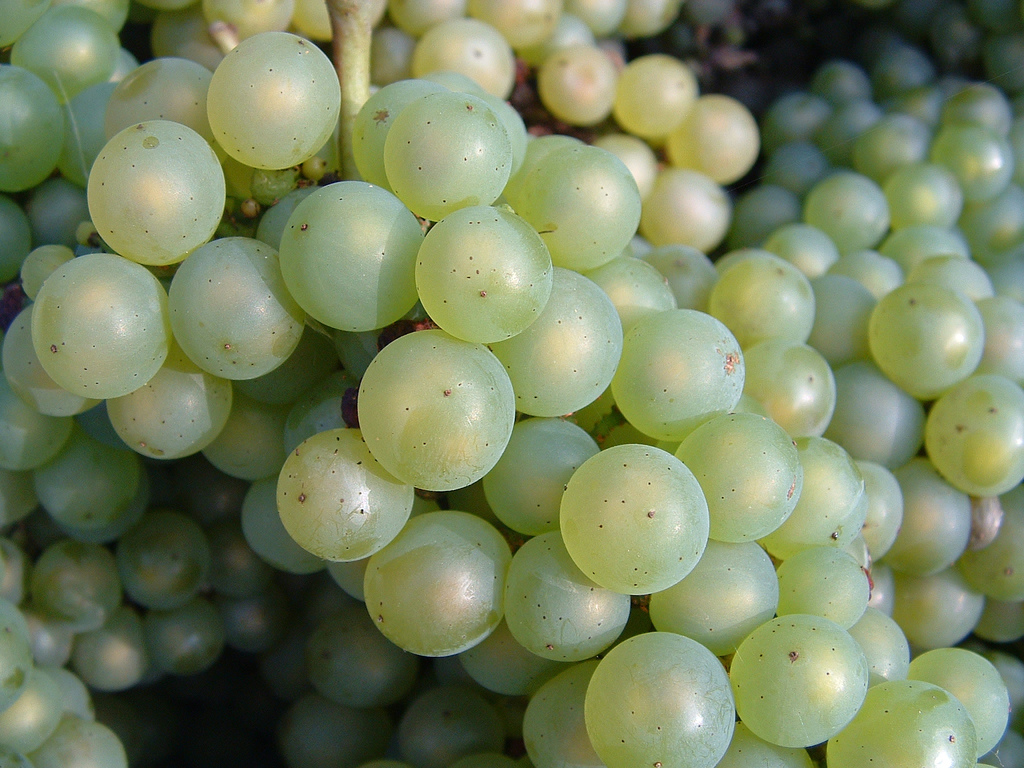
Chardonnay grapes after harvest

As of 2006, 34 clonal varieties of Chardonnay could be found in vineyards throughout France; most of these were developed at the University of Burgundy in Dijon. The so-called "Dijon clones" are bred for their adaptive attributes, with vineyard owners planting the clonal variety best suited to their terroir and which will produce the characteristics that they are seeking in the wine. Examples include the lower-yielding clones 'Dijon-76', '95' and '96' that produce more flavor-concentrated clusters. 'Dijon-77' and '809' produce more aromatic wines with a "grapey" perfume, while 'Dijon-75', '78', '121', '124', '125' and '277' are more vigorous and higher-yielding clones. New World varieties include the 'Mendoza' clone, which produced some of the early California Chardonnays. The 'Mendoza' clone is prone to develop millerandage, also known as "hens and chicks", where the berries develop unevenly. In places such as Oregon, the use of newer Dijon clones has had some success in those regions of the Willamette Valley with climates similar to that of Burgundy.

Chardonnay has served as parent to several French-American hybrid grapes, as well as crossings with other V. vinifera varieties. Examples include the hybrid Chardonel, which was a Chardonnay and Seyval blanc cross produced in 1953 at the New York State Agricultural Experiment Station. Mutations of the Chardonnay grape include the rare pink-berried 'Chardonnay Rose'; also 'Chardonnay Blanc Musqué', which produces an intensely aromatic wine. Chardonnay Blanc Musqué is mostly found around the Mâconnais village of Clessé and sometimes confused with the 'Dijon-166' clone planted in South Africa, which yields Muscat-like aromas.

In the 1930s, Chardonnay was crossed with a Seibel grape to create the hybrid grape Ravat blanc.

== Viticulture ==
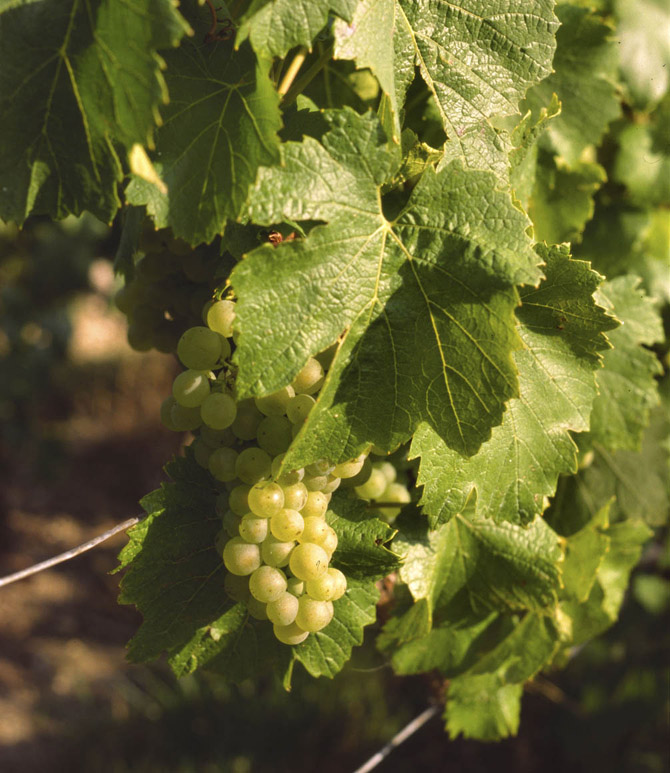
Chardonnay grapes in Champagne

Chardonnay has a wide-ranging reputation for relative ease of cultivation and ability to adapt to different conditions. The grape is very "malleable", in that it reflects and takes on the impression of its terroir and winemaker. It is a highly vigorous vine, with extensive leaf cover which can inhibit the energy and nutrient uptake of its grape clusters. Vineyard managers counteract this with aggressive pruning and canopy management. When Chardonnay vines are planted densely, they are forced to compete for resources and funnel energy into their grape clusters. In certain conditions, the vines can be very high-yielding, but the wine produced from such vines suffers a drop in quality if yields go much beyond 80 hl/ha (4.5 tons per acre). Producers of premium Chardonnay limit yields to less than half this amount. Sparkling wine producers tend not to focus as much on limiting yields, since concentrated flavors are not as important as the wine's finesse.

Harvesting time is crucial to winemaking, with the grape rapidly losing acidity as soon as it ripens. Some viticultural hazards include the risk of damage from springtime frost, as Chardonnay is an early-budding vine – usually a week after Pinot noir. To combat the threat of frost, a method developed in Burgundy involves aggressive pruning just prior to budburst. This "shocks" the vine and delays budburst up to two weeks, which is often long enough for warmer weather to arrive. Millerandage and coulure can also pose problems, along with powdery mildew attacking the thin skin of the grapes. Because of Chardonnay's early ripening, it can thrive in wine regions with short growing seasons, and in regions such as Burgundy, can be harvested before autumn rain sets in and brings the threat of rot.

While Chardonnay can adapt to almost all vineyard soils, the three it seems to like most are chalk, clay, and limestone, all very prevalent throughout Chardonnay's traditional "homeland". The Grand crus of Chablis are planted on hillsides composed of Kimmeridgian marl, limestone, and chalk. The outlying regions, falling under the more basic "Petit Chablis" appellation, are planted on portlandian limestone which produces wines with less finesse. Chalk beds are found throughout the Champagne region, and the Côte-d'Or has many areas composed of limestone and clay. In Burgundy, the amount of limestone to which the Chardonnay vines are exposed also seems to have some effect on the resulting wine. In the Meursault region, the premier cru vineyards planted at Meursault-Charmes have topsoil almost 2 m (79 in) above limestone and the resulting wines are very rich and rounded. In the nearby Les Perrières vineyard, the topsoil is only around 30 cm (12 in) above the limestone and the wine from that region is much more powerful, minerally, and tight, needing longer in the bottle to develop fully. In other areas, soil type can compensate for lack of ideal climate conditions. In South Africa, for example, regions with stonier, shaley soils and high clay levels tend to produce lower-yielding and more Burgundian-style wine, despite having a discernibly warmer climate than France. In contrast, South African Chardonnay produced from more sandstone-based vineyards tend to be richer and more weighty.

=== Confusion with Pinot blanc ===
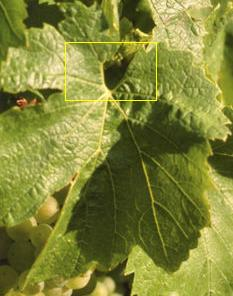
Closeup of a Chardonnay leaf (from the image of Chardonnay grapes in Champagne above): The yellow box highlights the naked veins around the petiolar sinus of the grape vine leaf.

Due to some ampelographical similarities, Pinot blanc and Chardonnay were often mistaken for each other and even today share many of the same synonyms. The grape vines, leaves, and clusters look identical at first glance, but some subtle differences are seen. The most visible of these can be observed as the grapes are ripening, with Chardonnay grapes taking on a more golden-green color than Pinot blanc grapes. On closer inspection, the grapevine shows slight differences in the texture and length of the hairs on the vine's shoot, and the veins of a Chardonnay leaf are "naked" near the petiolar sinus – the open area where the leaf connects to the stem is delineated by veins at the edge. Cabernet Sauvignon is one of the few other Vitis vinifera grape vines to share this characteristic. This confusion between Pinot blanc and Chardonnay was very pervasive throughout northern Italy, where the two vines grew interspersed in the vineyard and were blended in winemaking. The Italian government did not dispatch researchers to try to distinguish the two vines until 1978. A similar situation occurred in France, with the two vines being commonly confused until the mid-19th century, when ampelographers began combing through the vineyards of Chablis and Burgundy, identifying the true Chardonnay and weeding out the Pinot blanc.

== France ==
In France, Chardonnay is the second-most widely planted white grape variety just behind Ugni blanc and ahead of Sémillon and Sauvignon blanc. The grape first rose to prominence in the Chablis and Burgundy regions. In Champagne, it is most often blended with Pinot noir and Pinot Meunier, but is also used to produce single varietal blanc de blancs styles of sparkling wine. Chardonnay can be found in Appellation d'origine contrôlée (AOC) wines of the Loire Valley and Jura wine region, as well as the vin de pays wines of the Languedoc.

=== Burgundy ===
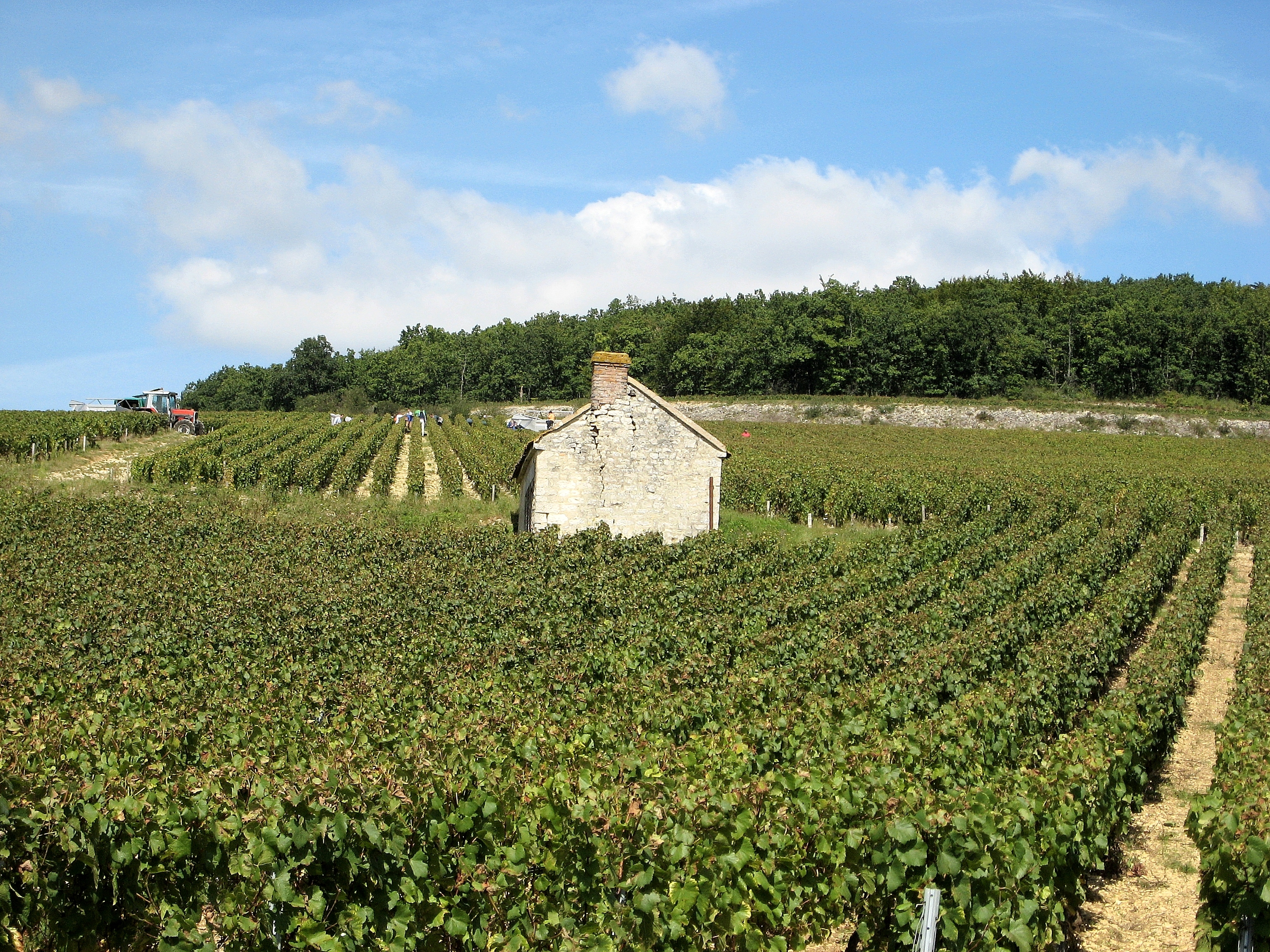
Harvesting Chardonnay in the Chablis Premier Cru of Fourchaume

Chardonnay is one of the dominant grapes in Burgundy, though Pinot noir vines outnumber it by nearly a three-to-one ratio. In addition to Chablis, Chardonnay is found in the Côte d'Or (largely in the Côte de Beaune), as well as the Côte Chalonnaise and Mâconnais. It is grown in eight grand cru vineyards; The "Montrachets"-Montrachet, Criots-Bâtard-Montrachet, Bâtard-Montrachet, Chevalier-Montrachet, and Bienvenues-Bâtard-Montrachet, as well as Charlemagne, Corton-Charlemagne, and Le Musigny. In addition to being the most expensive, the Burgundy examples of Chardonnay were long considered the benchmark standard of expressing terroir through Chardonnay. The Montrachets are noted for their high alcohol levels, often above 13%, as well as deep concentration of flavors. The vineyards around Chassagne-Montrachet tend to have a characteristic hazelnut aroma to them, while those of Puligny-Montrachet have more steely flavors. Both grand cru and premier cru examples from Corton-Charlemagne have been known to demonstrate marzipan, while Meursault wines tend to be the most round and buttery examples.

South of the Côte d'Or are the Côte Chalonnaise and Mâconnais wine regions. The villages of Mercurey, Montagny-lès-Buxy, and Rully are the largest producers of Chardonnay in the Côte Chalonnaise, with the best-made examples rivaling those of the Côte de Beaune. In the Mâconnais, white wine production is centered on the town of Mâcon and the Pouilly-Fuissé region. The full-bodied wines of the Pouilly-Fuissé have long held cult wine status with prices that can rival the grand cru white burgundies. Further south, in the region of Beaujolais, Chardonnay has started to replace Aligoté as the main white wine grape and is even replacing Gamay in some areas around Saint-Véran. With the exception of Pouilly-Fuissé, the wines of the Mâconnais are the closest Burgundy example to "New World" Chardonnay, though it is not identical. Typically, Mâcon blanc, basic Bourgogne, Beaujolais blanc, and Saint-Véran are meant to be consumed within two to three years of release. However, many of the well-made examples of white Burgundy from the Côte d'Or need at least three years in the bottle to develop enough to express the aromas and character of the wine. Hazelnut, licorice, and spice are some of the flavors that can develop as these wines age.

=== Chablis ===
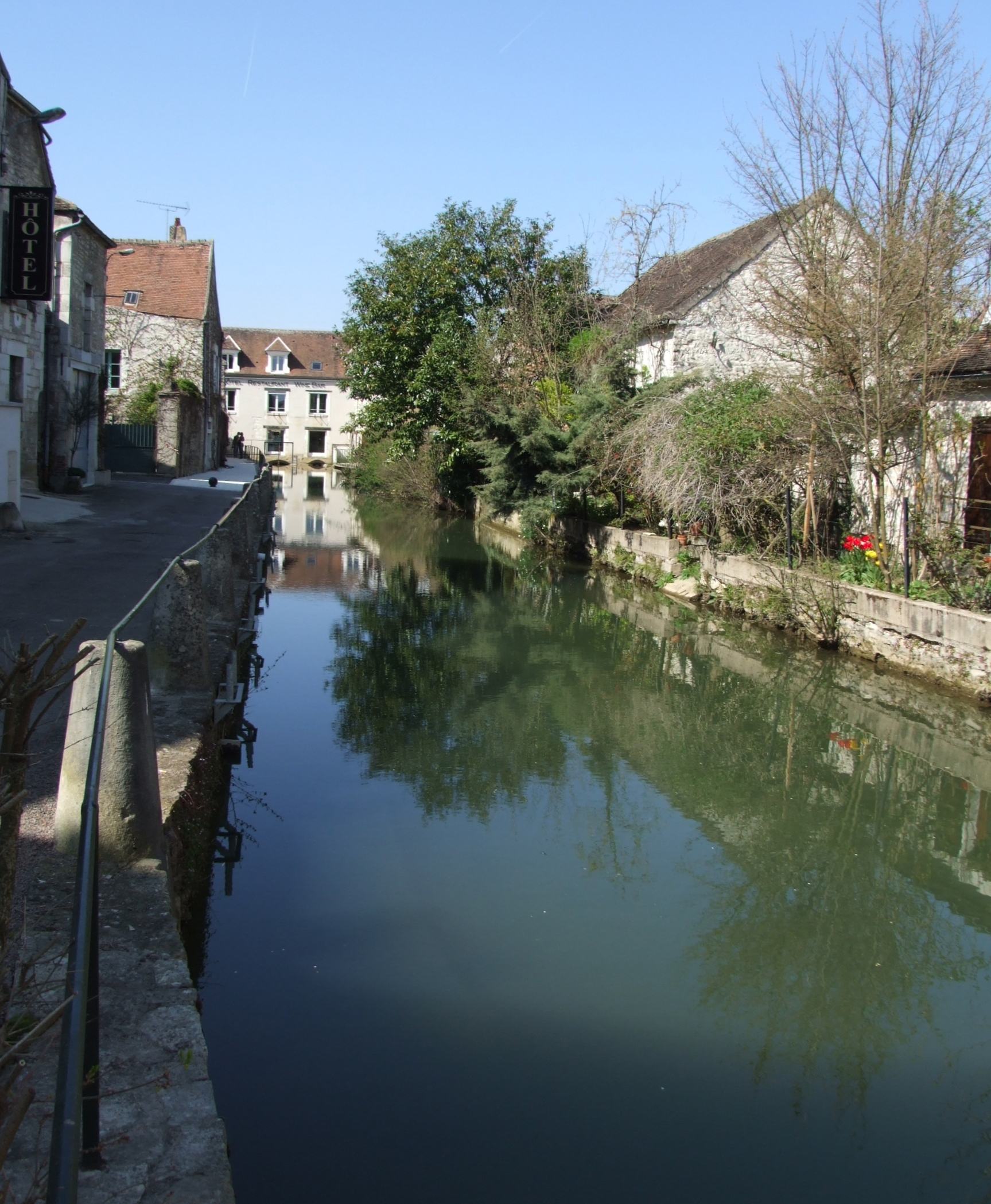
The Serein River runs through the town of Chablis, with many of the region's most prestigious vineyards planted on hillsides along the river.

Chardonnay is the only permitted AOC grape variety in the Chablis region, with the wines there developing such worldwide recognition that the name "Chablis" has taken on somewhat generic connotations to mean any dry white wine, even those not made from Chardonnay. The name is protected in the European Union and for wine sold in the EU, "Chablis" refers only to the Chardonnay wine produced in this region of the Yonne département. The region sits on the outer edges of the Paris Basin. On the other side of the basin is the village of Kimmeridge in England, which gives its name to the Kimmeridgean soil that is located throughout Chablis. The French describe this soil as argilo-calcaire and is a composition of clay, limestone, and fossilized oyster shells. The most expensive examples of Chardonnay from Chablis come from the seven Grand Cru vineyards that account for around 247 acres (100 ha) on the southwest side of one slope along the Serein River near the towns of Chablis—Blanchots, Bougros, Les Clos, Grenouilles, Preuses, Valmur, and Vaudésir. The wines from these crus most often capture the goût de pierre à fusil or "gunflint" quality that is characteristic of Chablis wine.

Chardonnay was believed to be first planted in Chablis by the Cistercians at Pontigny Abbey in the 12th century. Today, the Chardonnay made in the Chablis region is one of the "purest" expression of the varietal character of the grape due to the simplistic style of winemaking favored in this region. Chablis winemakers want to emphasise the terroir of the calcareous soil and cooler climate that help maintain high acidity. The wines rarely go through malolactic fermentation or are exposed to oak (though its use is increasing). The biting, green apple-like acidity is a trademark of Chablis and can be noticeable in the bouquet. The acidity can mellow with age and Chablis are some of the longest-living examples of Chardonnay. Some examples of Chablis can have an earthy "wet stone" flavor that can get mustier as it ages before mellowing into delicate honeyed notes. The use of oak is controversial in the Chablis community, with some winemakers dismissing it as counter to the "Chablis style" or terroir, while others embrace its use, though not to the length that would characterise a "New World" Chardonnay. The winemakers who use oak tend to favor more neutral oak that does not impart the vanilla characteristic associated with American oak. The amount of "char" in the barrel is often very light, which limits the amount of "toastiness" perceived in the wine. The advocates of oak in Chablis point to the positive benefits of allowing limited oxygenation with the wine through the permeable oak barrels. This can have the effect of softening the wine and making the generally austere and acidic Chablis more approachable at a younger age.

=== Champagne ===
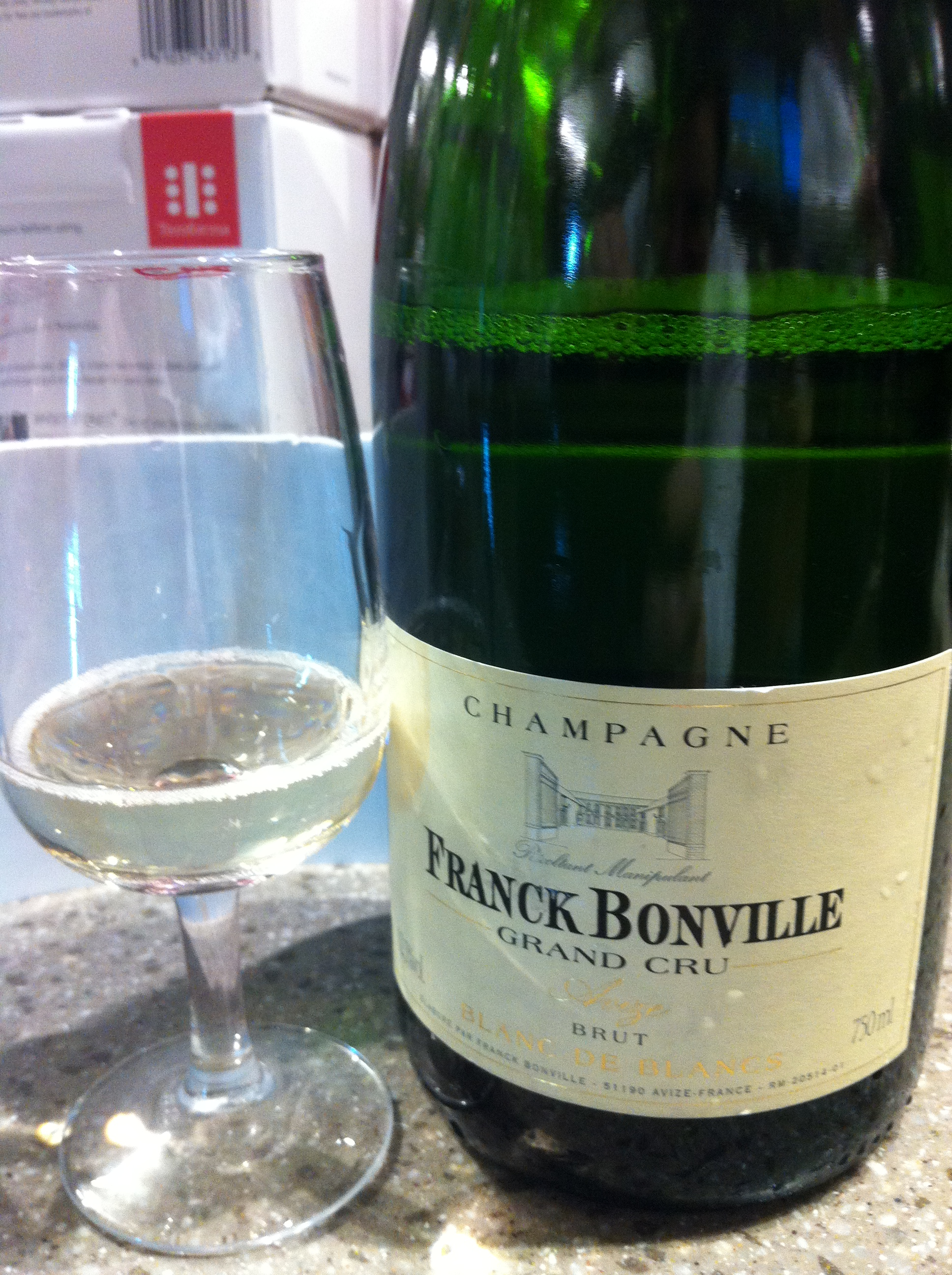
A Blanc de Blancs Champagne made only from Chardonnay grapes

In the Champagne, Chardonnay is one of three major grape varieties planted in the region. It is most commonly found in the Aube and Marne départments which, combined with Chablis, accounted for more than half of all plantings of Chardonnay in France during the 20th century. In the Côte des Blancs (white slope) district of the Marne, Chardonnay thrives on the chalk soil. The three main villages around the Côte grow Chardonnay that emphasizes certain characteristics that the Champagne producers seek depending on their house style. The village of Avize grows grapes that produce the lightest wines, Cramant makes the most aromatic, and Mesnil produces wines with the most acidity. The Côte des Blancs is the only district in the Champagne region predominately planted with Chardonnay. In the four other main districts – Aube, Côte de Sézanne, Montagne de Reims, and Vallée de la Marne – Chardonnay lags behind Pinot noir in planting. In the outlying region of Aisne, only Pinot Meunier has a significant presence. Despite being less planted, the Blanc de Blancs style of Champagne (made from only Chardonnay grapes) is far more commonly produced than Blanc de Noirs. This is partly because Pinot noir and Pinot Meunier produce very coarse and heavy wines that lack the finesse and balance that Chardonnay brings to the mix. Nonsparkling still wine Chardonnay is produced under the Coteaux Champenois AOC. The wine is much more acidic than that of Chablis and is normally made bone-dry.

Despite receiving the same amount of sunshine as the Chablis region, Chardonnay grapes in Champagne rarely attain full ripeness due to the mean temperature of the region being around 10 °C (50 °F), barely above the minimum average temperature needed to ripen grapes. Therefore, the Chardonnay grapes do not fully develop their fruit flavors and the still version of Champagne can taste very "un-Chardonnay"-like because of this. However, it does lessen the premium on needing to keep yields low that other wine regions battle, since not much flavor is going to develop in the grapes, anyway. Rather, the element in Chardonnay that Champagne wine-makers look for is the finesse and balance of acidity that it brings to the blend. Some flavors that can emerge from, particularly with extended time on its lees, include creamy and nuttiness with some floral notes.

=== Other French regions ===
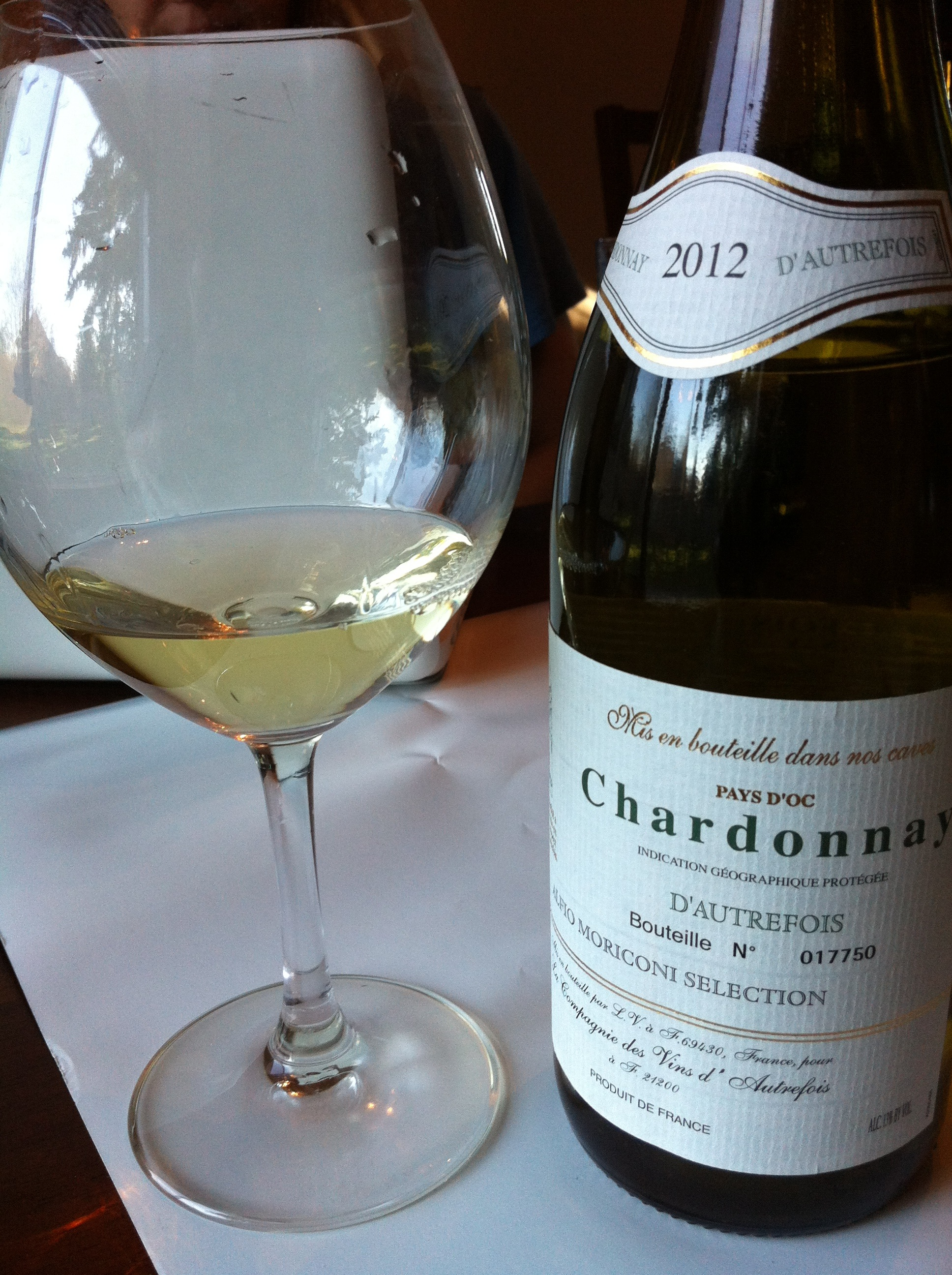
A Chardonnay from the Pay d'Oc region of the Languedoc

Champagne, Chablis, and Burgundy account for more than three-fifths of all Chardonnay plantings in France. The next-largest concentration is found in the Languedoc, where it was first planted around the town of Limoux and up to 30% can be blended with Mauzac in the sparkling Blanquette de Limoux. Every year since 1991, Chardonnay production is celebrated in Limoux during the Toques et Clochers festival. By 2000, more than 9,000 hectares (22,000 acres) were planted, with many being used for wines under the Vin de Pays d'Oc. These wines were unique in that they were some of the first examples of Chardonnay to be varietally labeled as "Chardonnay". Other French wine regions with Chardonnay plantings include Alsace, Ardèche, Jura, Savoie, and the Loire Valley. In Jura, it is used to create vin de paille dessert wines. Here, the grape is known as Melon d'Arbois or Gamay blanc and is sometimes blended with Savagnin. It is most widely found in Arbois, Côtes du Jura, and L'Étoile AOCs. In the Loire, up to 20% of Chardonnay can be included in the Chenin blanc-based wines of Anjou blanc and more producers are using the grape to soften some of the edges of Chenin blanc. It can also be used in the sparkling wines of Saumur and some Muscadet producers have begun experimenting with oak-aged Chardonnay.

== North America ==
In North America, particularly California, Chardonnay found another region where it could thrive and produce a style of wine noticeably different from that of France. It is the dominant white wine variety of the area, overtaking Riesling in 1990. In the United States, it is found most notably in California, Oregon, Texas, Virginia, and Washington, but also in Alabama, Arizona, Arkansas, Colorado, Connecticut, Georgia, Idaho, Illinois, Indiana, Iowa, Maryland, Massachusetts, Michigan, Minnesota, Missouri, New Hampshire, New Jersey, New Mexico, New York, North Carolina, Ohio, Oklahoma, South Carolina, Tennessee, and Vermont. In Canada, Chardonnay is found in British Columbia, Nova Scotia, Ontario, and Quebec, and in Mexico is found in Baja California (Valle de Guadalupe) and in Coahuila (Valle de Parras) states.

=== California ===
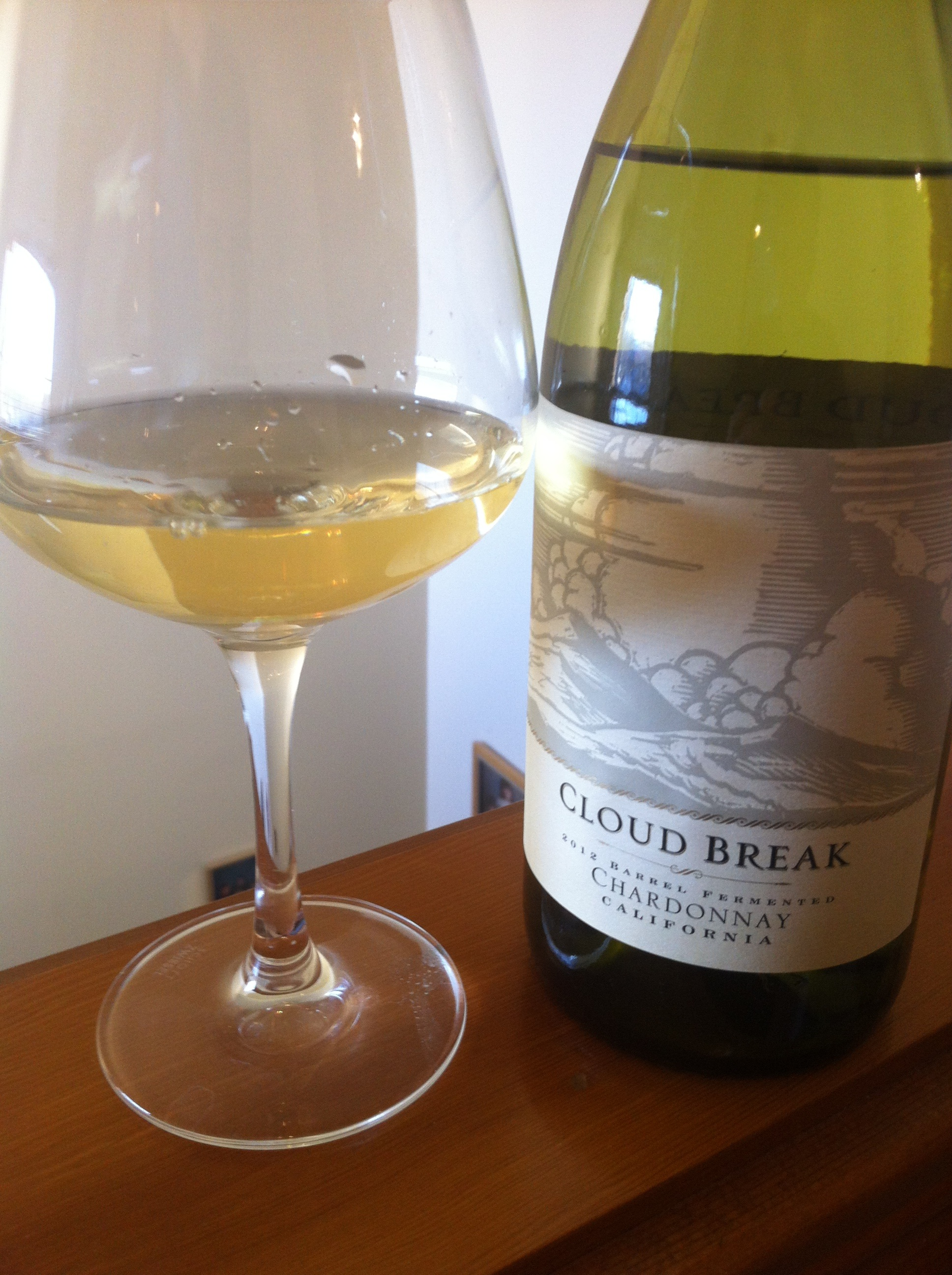
A California Chardonnay that has been barrel-fermented

The first successful commercial production of California Chardonnay was from plantings in the Livermore Valley AVA. Wente Vineyards developed a Chardonnay clone that was used to introduce the grape variety in several Californian vineyards throughout the 1940s. In the 1950s, James David Zellerbach, one-time US Ambassador to Italy in Rome, started Hanzell Vineyards winery and dedicated it to making Burgundian-style Chardonnay. His success encouraged other Californian winemakers to follow suit and culminated in Chateau Montelena's victory over Burgundy Chardonnay in the 1976 blind tasting event conducted by French judges known as the Judgment of Paris. In response, the demand for Californian Chardonnay increased and Californian winemakers rushed to increase plantings. In the 1980s, the popularity of Californian Chardonnay increased so much, the number of vines planted in the state eclipsed that of France by 1988. By 2005, nearly 100,000 acres (40,000 ha) accounted for almost 25% of the world's total Chardonnay plantings. The early trend was to imitate the great Burgundy wines, but this soon gave way to more rich buttery and oaked styles. Starting with the 1970s, the focus was on harvesting the grapes at more advanced degrees of ripeness and higher Brix levels. New oak barrels were used to produce wines that were big in body and mouthfeel. Frank J. Prial of The New York Times was an early critic of this style, particularly because of the lack of "food friendliness" that was common with these massive wines. Another criticism of California Chardonnays, and one that has been levied against other Californian wines, is the very high alcohol levels which can make a wine seem out of balance. In recent years, California winemakers have been using process such as reverse osmosis and spinning cones to bring the alcohol levels down to 12 to 14%.

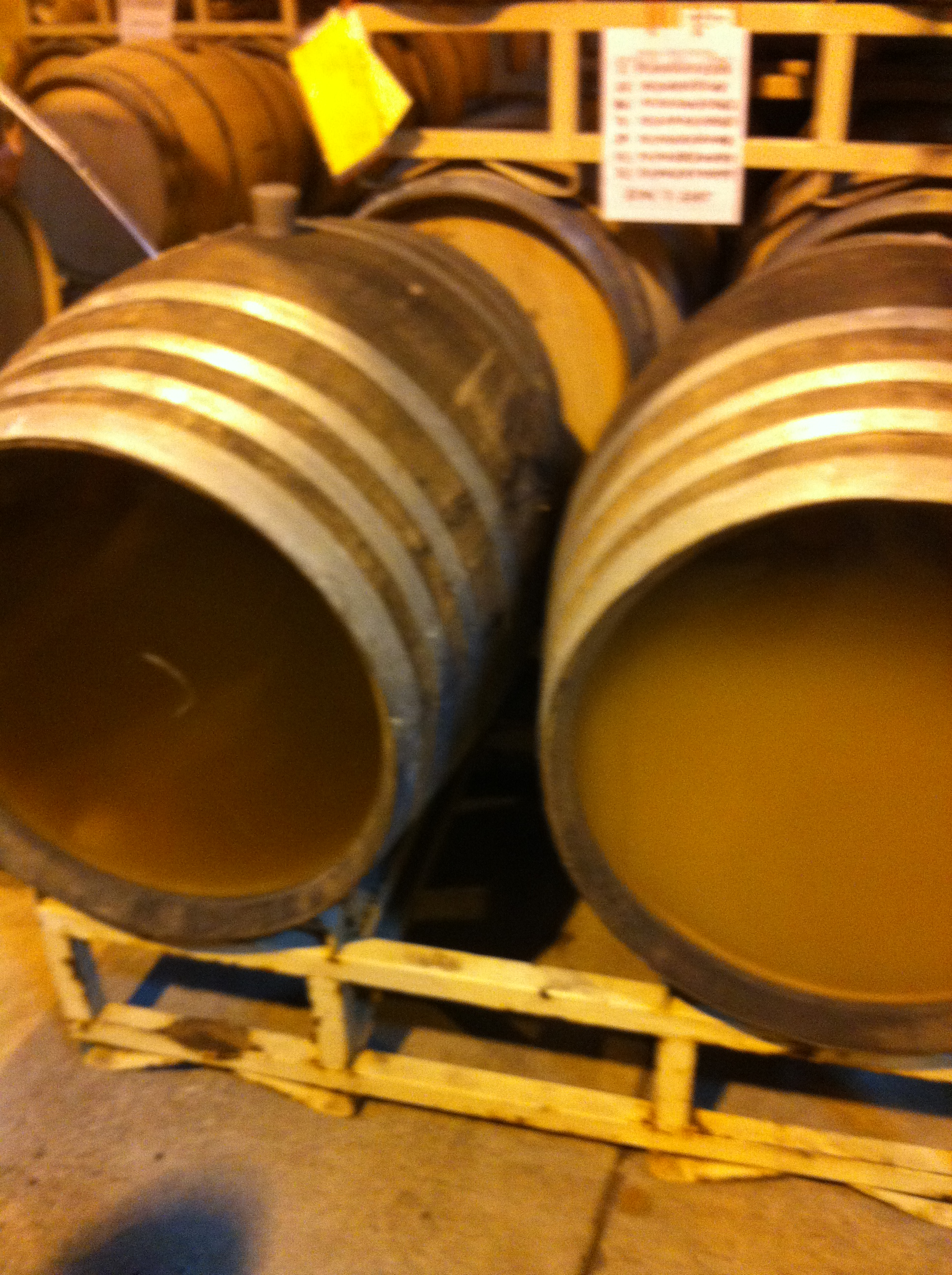
Chardonnay is often aged on its lees in barrels with the lees periodically stirred to give it a softer, creamy mouthfeel. The example on the right is a barrel of Chardonnay that has had its lees recently stirred.

The California wine regions that seem to favor producing premium quality Chardonnay are the ones that are most influenced, climatically, by coastal fogs that can slow the ripening of the grape and give it more time to develop its flavors. The regions of Alexander Valley, Los Carneros, Santa Maria Valley, Russian River Valley, and other parts of Sonoma County have shown success in producing wines that reflect more Burgundian styles. Other regions often associated with Chardonnay include Napa Valley, Monterey County, and Santa Barbara County. The California Central Valley is home to many mass-produced Chardonnay brands, as well as box and jug wine production. While the exact style of the wine varies by producer, some of the terroir characteristics associated with California Chardonnay include "flinty" notes with the Russian River Valley and mango and guava from Monterey. A large portion of the Californian sparkling wine industry uses Chardonnay grapes from Carneros, Alexander, and Russian River valleys, with these areas attracting the attention of Champagne producers such as Bollinger, Louis Roederer, Moët et Chandon, and the Taittinger family, which have opened up wineries in last few decades.

=== New York ===
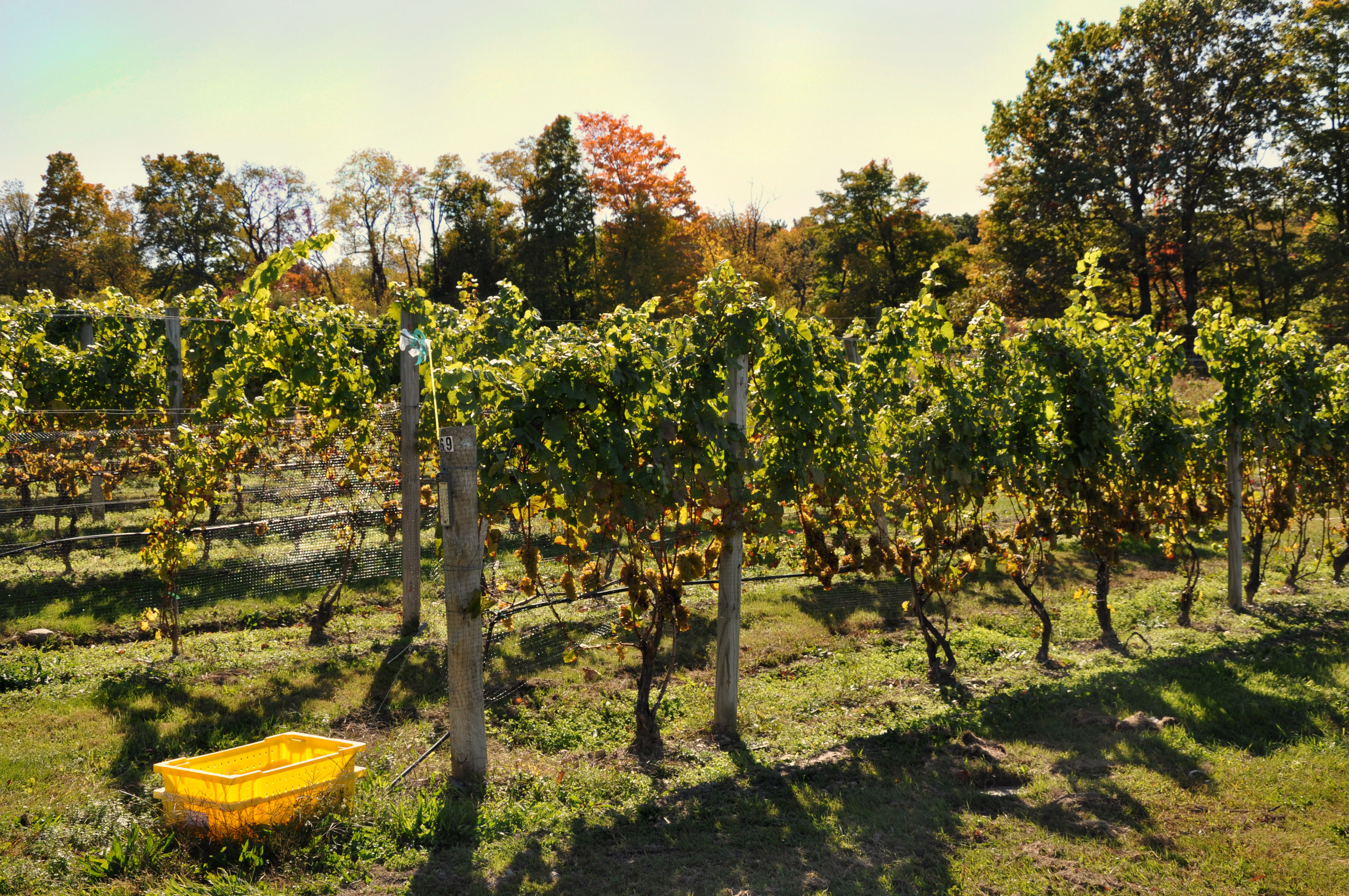
Chardonnay harvest in the Hudson River Region AVA

Chardonnay was one of the first European grape varieties to have been grown commercially east of the Rocky Mountains. After three centuries of failure with V. vinifera, this achievement was realized in the Finger Lakes region of upstate New York. Frenchman Charles Fournier and Russian Konstantin Frank experimented with Chardonnay and other varietals in hopes of producing sparkling wines based on Old World grapes for the Gold Seal wine company. In the late 1950s, they succeeded in harvesting the first commercial quantities of European grapes in eastern North America. Frank went on to found Konstantin Frank Vinifera Wine Cellars which helped demonstrate that a winery in the eastern US can produce European-style wines as a basis for a winery business. Chardonnay became an important part of that strategy.

New York, like Burgundy and Washington, is a cool-climate viticultural region. Being cold tolerant, the Chardonnay grape is well suited for New York. Not only can it endure its cold winters, but also buds late, reducing the risk of spring frosts. New York's comparatively cooler growing season causes slower ripening, requiring a longer time on the vine, which allows the grapes to develop greater complexity and character at more reasonable sugar levels than warmer Chardonnay-producing regions. New York has subsequently developed significant plantings of the variety since Fournier and Frank's early experiments.

=== Other states ===
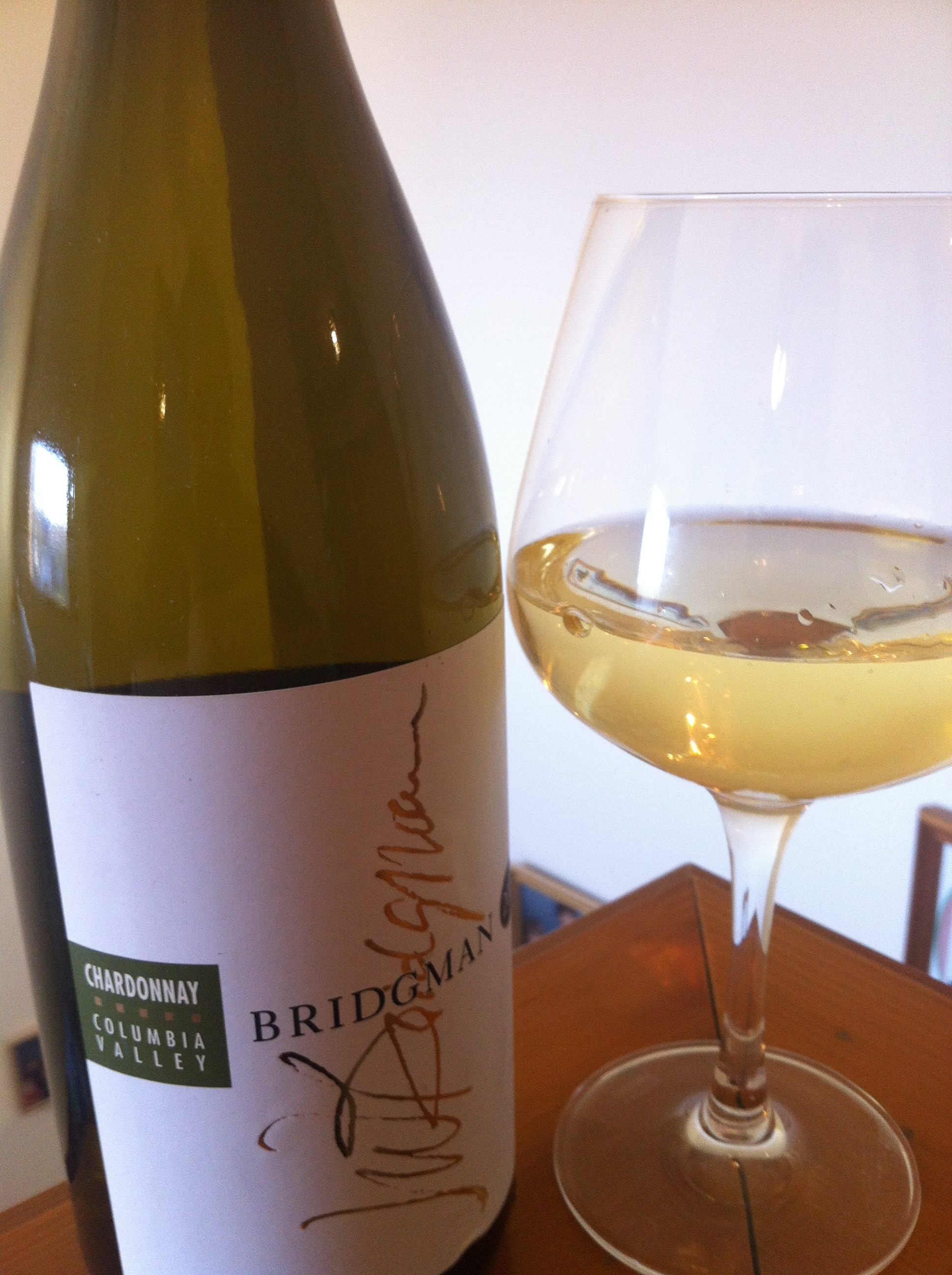
A Chardonnay from the Columbia Valley AVA of Washington

Washington Chardonnays can be very similar to Californian Chardonnays, but tend to have more emphasis on fruit than creaminess. In 2000, it was the most widely planted premium wine grape in the state. Rather than using Dijon clones, Washington vineyards are planted with clones developed at the University of California-Davis that are designed to take longer to ripen in the warmer weather of the state's wine regions. This allows winemakers to maintain the acidity levels that balance the fruity and flint earthiness that have characterized Washington Chardonnay. Apple notes are common, and depending on producer and appellation, can range from flavors of 'Golden Delicious' and 'Fuji' to 'Gala' and 'Jonathan'. In Oregon, the introduction of Dijon clones from Burgundy has helped to adapt the grape to the Oregon climate and soils.

=== Canada ===
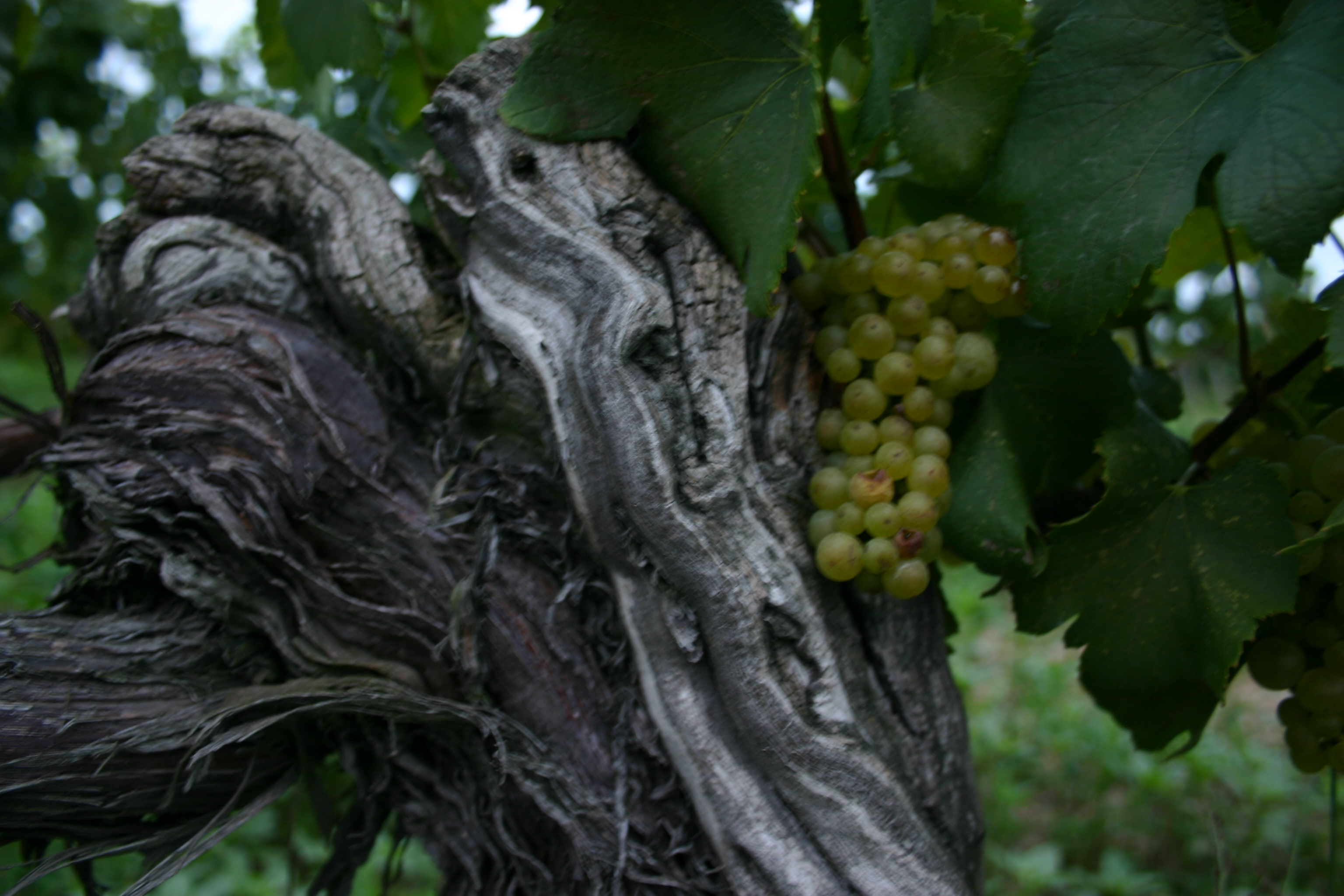
A 50-plus-year-old vine planting of Chardonnay in Ontario

In Canada, Chardonnay has seen some success with rich, oaky styles produced in Ontario and lighter styles produced in Quebec and British Columbia. In 2009, Le Clos Jordanne winery, of Jordan Village on the Niagara Peninsula, Ontario, received critical acclaim for its 2005 Claystone Terrace Chardonnay, which won the top spot for Chardonnay in the "Judgement of Montreal" experts’ tasting. This recognition, which caught the attention of the wine community, resulted from a blind tasting held in Quebec for Cellier magazine. Thirty-three years after the "Judgment of Paris", Cellier organized a blind tasting in Montreal based on the Judgment of Paris. In the "Judgement of Montreal", 10 judges at the Cellier tasting assessed 16 red and 14 white wines, primarily from France and California. The Chardonay from Le Clos Jordanne placed first out of the 14 white wines, some of which were notable international wines, including: Chateau Montelena, Mer Soleil, Kumeu River, an aged reserve wine from Rosemount Estates, and a number of Burgundian entrants from producers such as Drouhin, Lamy, Boisset, Maison Louis Jadot, and others. Other great examples of Ontario chardonnay include Closson Chase and Norman Hardie from the Prince Edward County region, and Tawse Winery, Hidden Bench Vineyards, and Southbrook Vineyards from the Niagara region.

The Chardonnay vintages of the early 1990s from British Columbia helped generate international attention to the quality of Canadian wines apart from ice wine varietals. In British Columbia, Chardonnay from the Okanagan are characterized by delicate citrus fruits. They are typically light-bodied, but producers who use barrel fermentation and oak aging can produce fuller-bodied wines.

== Australia and New Zealand ==
=== Australia ===
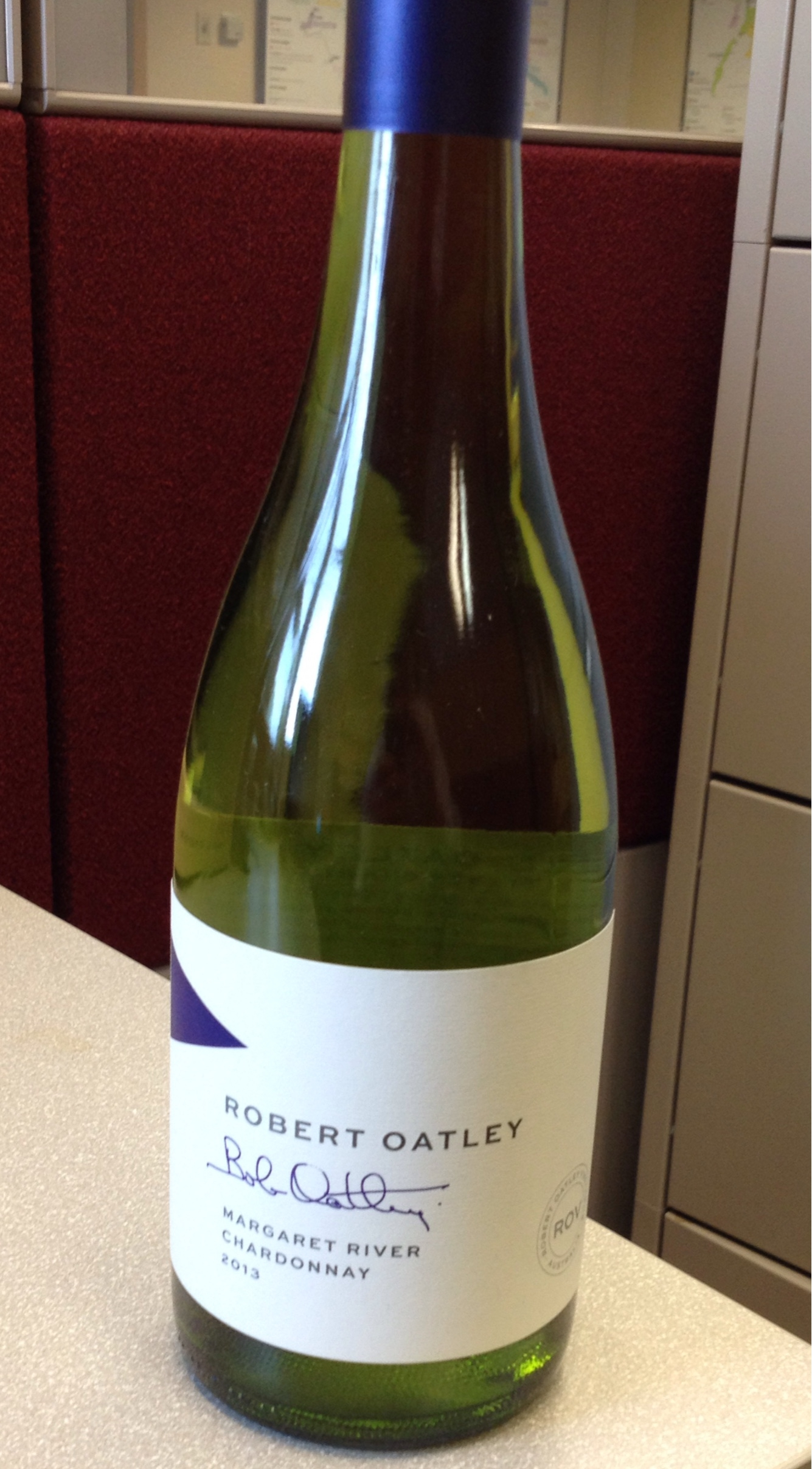
An Australian Chardonnay, from the Margaret River wine region of Australia

Like many grape varieties, Chardonnay first came to Australia in the collection of James Busby in 1832, but it only really took off in the 1950s. It is most significant in South Australia, New South Wales — especially the Hunter Valley - and Victoria. One of the first commercially successful Chardonnays was produced by Murray Tyrrell in the Hunter Valley in 1971. Tyrell's vineyard was planted with Chardonnay cuttings that he "borrowed" from Penfolds' experimental plantings by hopping over their barb-wire fence one night and pruning their vines. The export driven Australian wine industry was well situated for the Chardonnay boom of the 1980s and 1990s and Australia responded with a unique style of wine that was characterized by big fruit flavors and easy approachability. To compensate for the very warm climate, richness was enhanced by the use of oak chips and acid was added during fermentation. During this period the number of Chardonnay plants increased fivefold and by 1990 it was the most widely planted white wine grape in Australia and third most planted overall behind Shiraz and Cabernet Sauvignon. Early in the 21st century, demand outpaced supply and there was a shortage of Chardonnay grapes which prompted Australian winemakers to introduce new blending partners like Sémillon (known as "SemChard") and Colombard.

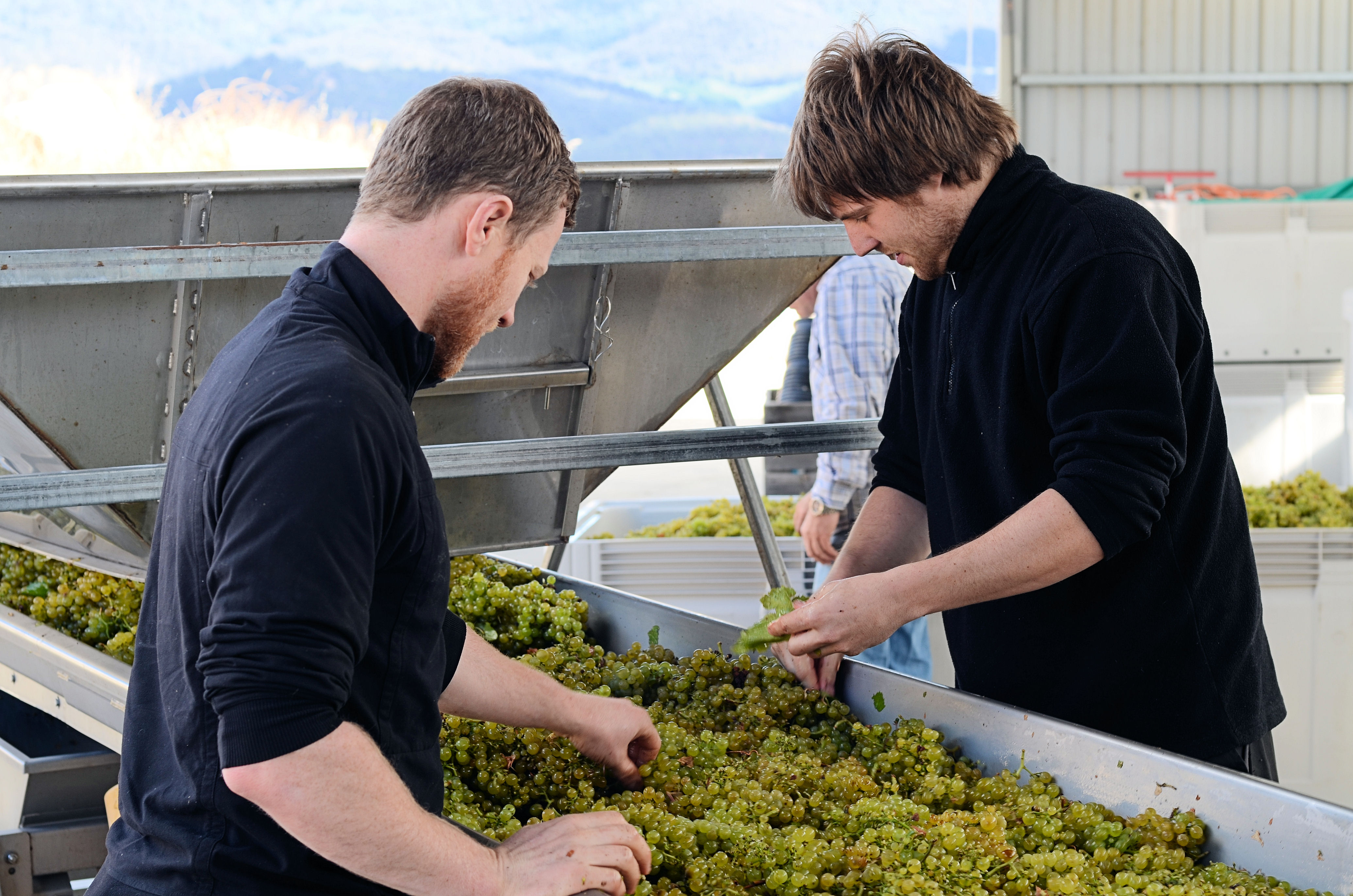
Freshly harvested Chardonnay grapes being sorted in Tasmania to remove bad clusters and MOG (material other than grapes) such as leaves

Being a rather neutral grape, Australian winemakers first approached Chardonnay in the same manner they were making wine from the similarly neutral Sultana grape. Aromatic yeast were added and maceration was extended to get more flavors from skin contact. While the style of Australian Chardonnay is mostly characterized by the mass-produced products of the hot Riverland region, the cooler climates of the Southern Highlands in New South Wales, Victoria and Tasmania have been creating more crisp, less oaked wines with lime notes. In the Cowra region, Chardonnay's citrus notes are emphasized while Hunter Valley examples have more richness and smoky notes. The Adelaide Hills and Yarra Valley produce a more Burgundian style while Mount Barker in the Great Southern wine region of Western Australia produces Chardonnay that more closely resembles those of Chablis. A rare, isolated clone exists in the Mudgee region that locals believe traces its ancestry back to some of the first vines brought to Australia in the 19th century. While the wine made from this clone is not particularly distinguished, it can still be of very good quality. Overall, there has been a shift in style since the 1980s from deep golden, oily wines with melon and butterscotch flavors to lighter, paler Chardonnays with more structure and notes of white peaches and nectarines. Sparkling wines from Chardonnay are produced in the cool regions of Geelong, Adelaide Hills, Macedon Ranges and Tasmania.

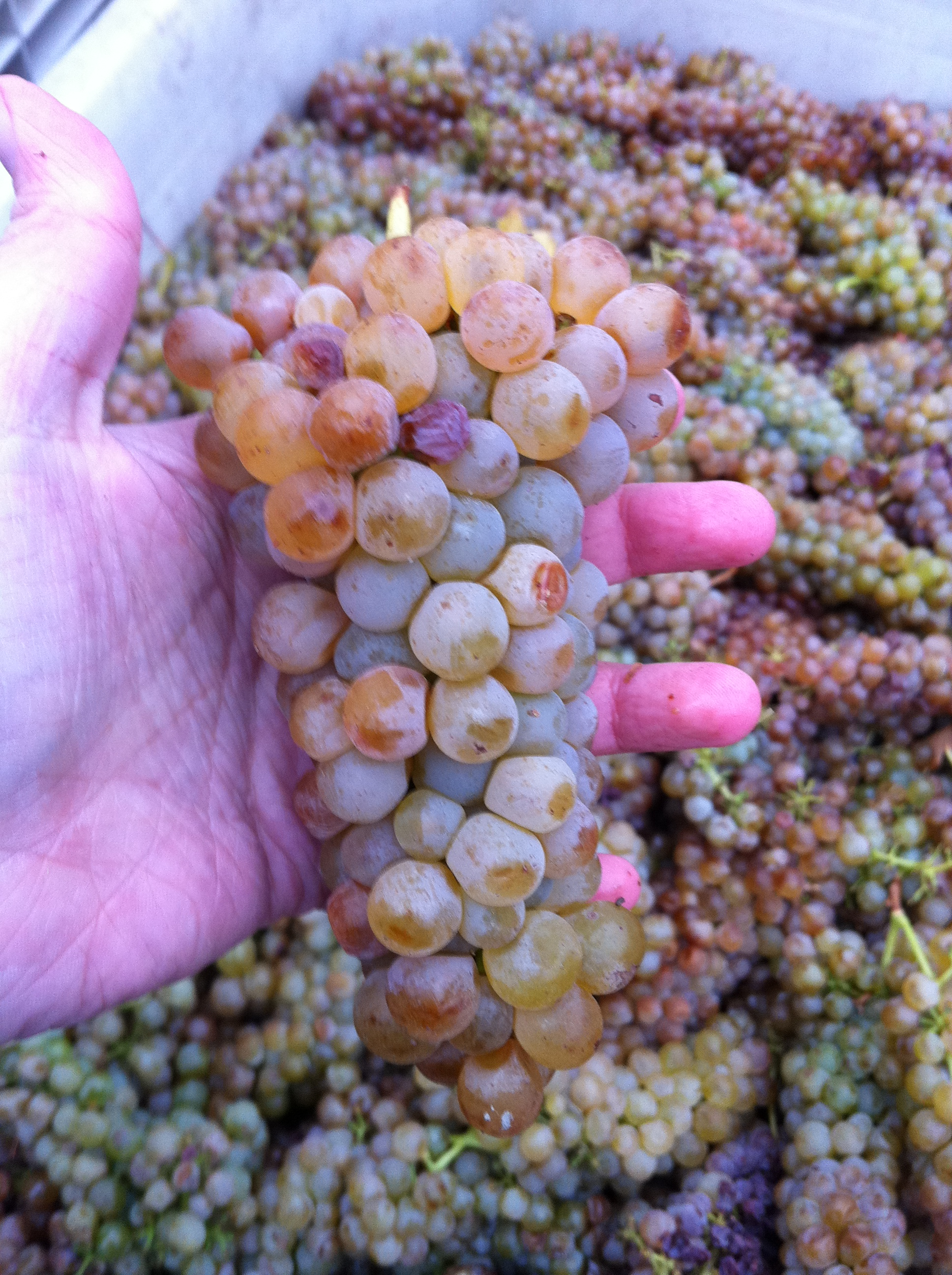
Sémillon (cluster pictured) is sometimes blended with Australian Chardonnay in the "SemChard" style.

=== New Zealand ===
Despite being more famous for its Sauvignon blanc production, Chardonnay was New Zealand's most widely planted grape variety from 1990 till 2002 when Sauvignon blanc finally surpassed it. The east coast of the North Island, in places like Hawke's Bay and Wairarapa, have seen the most success with Chardonnay wine that has noticeable acidity and leanness. As better clonal varieties are discovered and planted, the overall quality of New Zealand Chardonnay have increased, particularly from places like Canterbury, Marlborough and Nelson. Some producers in the Gisborne region have recently developed a cult following for their Chardonnay among New Zealand wine drinkers. While many New Zealand winemakers are still developing a characteristic style, the Chardonnay produced so far have emphasized the grape's affinity for oak.

Chardonnay is also grown on a small scale in the Waitaki Valley of North Otago. The region has a cool climate with long, dry autumns, and vineyards are planted on limestone slopes and alluvial gravels containing greywacke, schist and limestone. Producers include Clos Ostler, whose first Chardonnay vintage, in 2024, was made from clone 95 and fermented in barrel.

== Italy ==
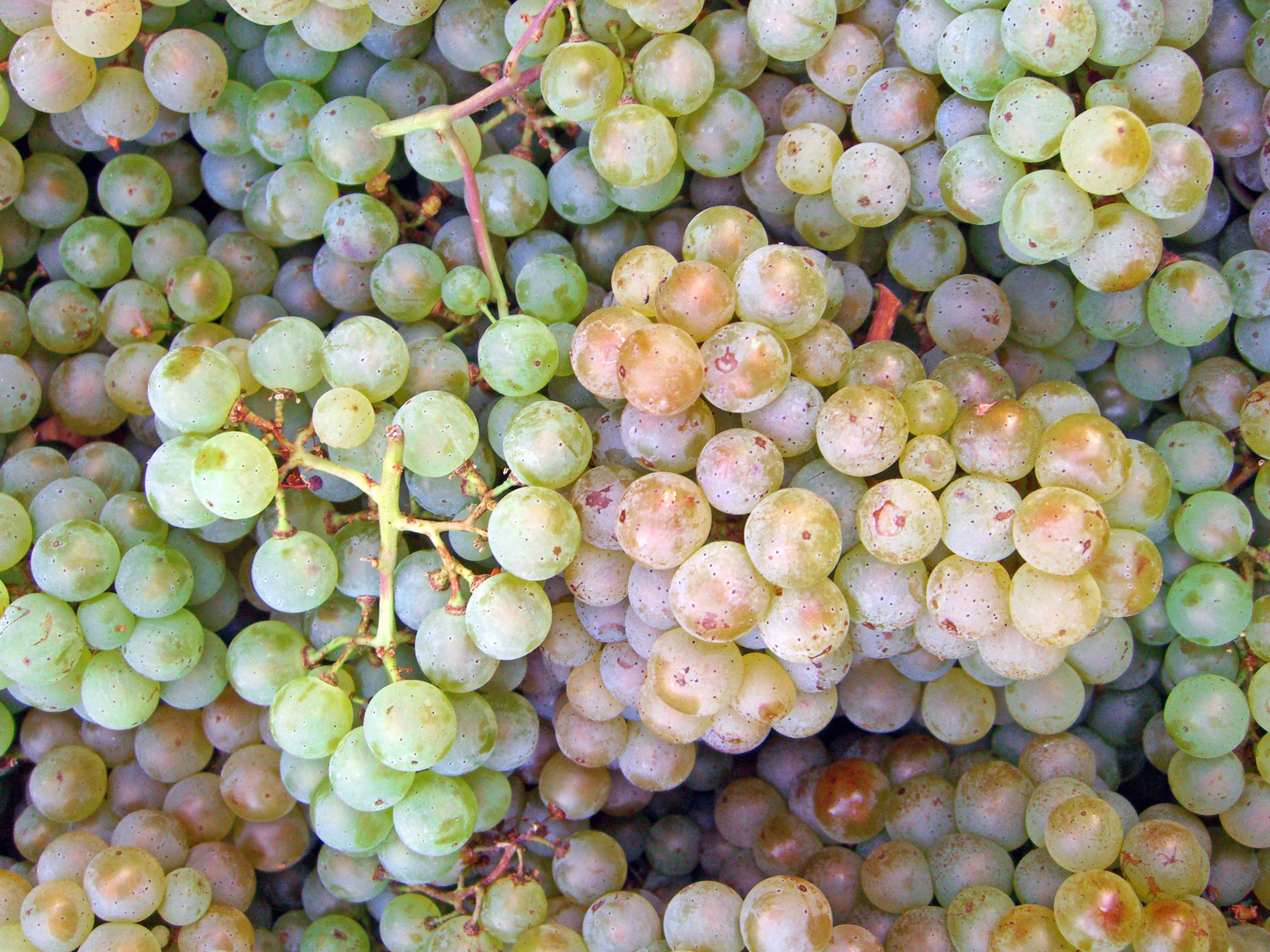
Pinot blanc grapes

Chardonnay has a long history in Italy but for a large part of it, the grape was commonly confused with Pinot blanc—often with both varieties interplanted in the same vineyard and blended together. This happened despite the fact that Chardonnay grapes get more golden-yellow in color close to harvest time and can be visually distinguished from Pinot blanc. In the Trentino-Alto Adige/Südtirol region this confusion appeared in the synonyms for each grape, with Pinot blanc being known as "Weissburgunder" (White Burgundy) and Chardonnay was known as "Gelber Weissburgunder" (Golden White Burgundy). By the late 20th century, more concentrated efforts were put into identifying Chardonnay and making pure varietal versions of the wine. In 1984, it was granted its first Denominazione di origine controllata (DOC) in the province of South Tyrol. By 2000, it was Italy's fourth most widely planted white wine grape.

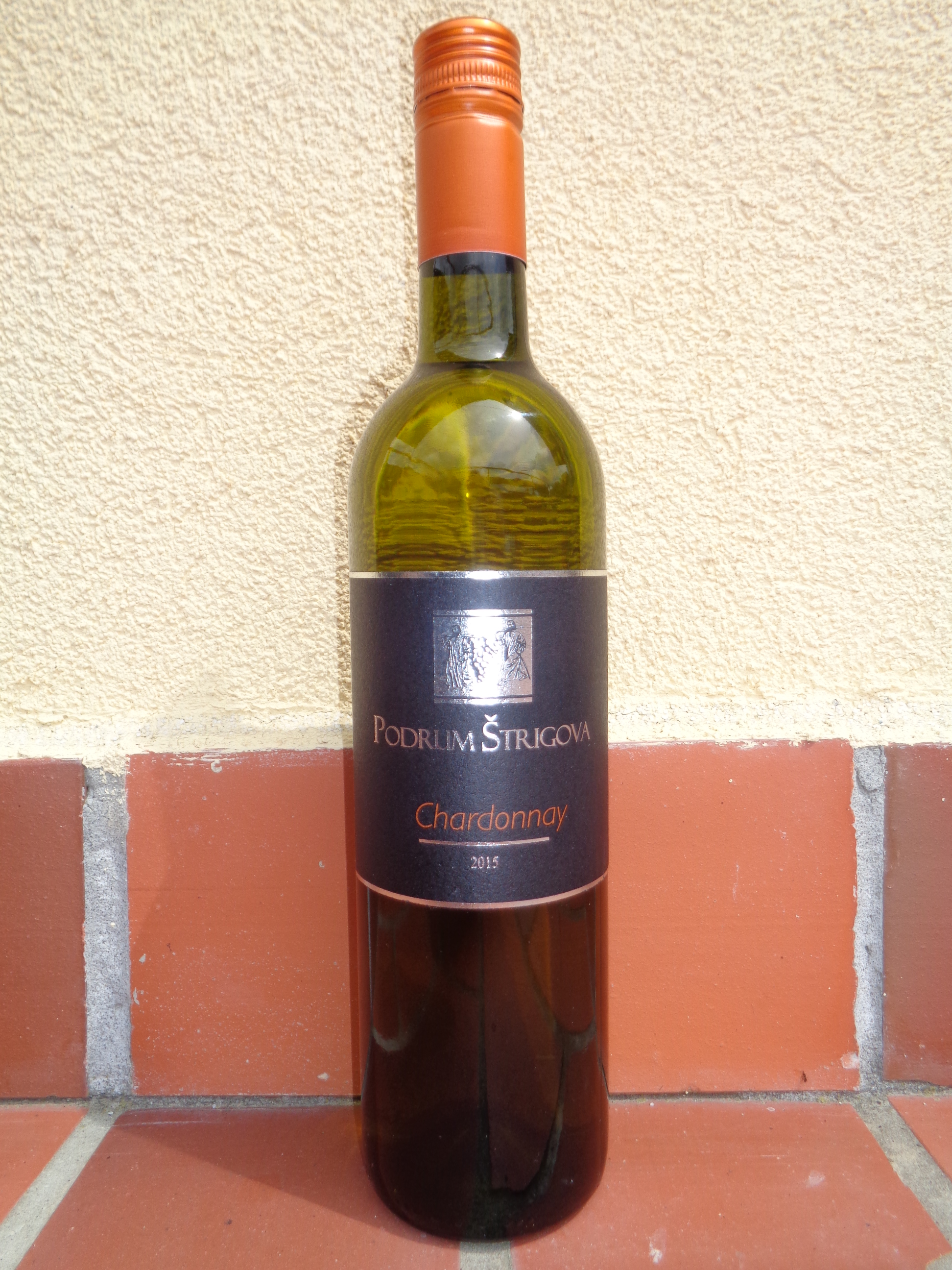
A bottle of Chardonnay from Croatia

Though many varietal forms of Chardonnay are produced, and the numbers are increasing, for most of its history in Italian winemaking Chardonnay was a blending grape. Besides Pinot bianco, Chardonnay can be found in blends with Albana, Catarratto, Cortese, Erbaluce, Favorita, Garganega, Grecanico, Incrocio Manzoni, Nuragus, Procanico, Ribolla Gialla, Verdeca, Vermentino and Viognier. It even blended into a dry White Zinfandel-style Nebbiolo wine that is made from the white juice of the red Nebbiolo grape prior to being dyed with skin contact. Most Chardonnay plantings are located in the northern wine regions, though plantings can be found throughout Italy as far south as Sicily and Apulia. In Piedmont and Tuscany, the grape is being planted in sites that are less favorable to Dolcetto and Sangiovese respectively. In Lombardy, the grape is often used for spumante and in the Veneto it is often blended with Garganega to give more weight and structure to the wine. Chardonnay is also found in the Valle d'Aosta DOC and Friuli-Venezia Giulia wine region.

== South Africa ==
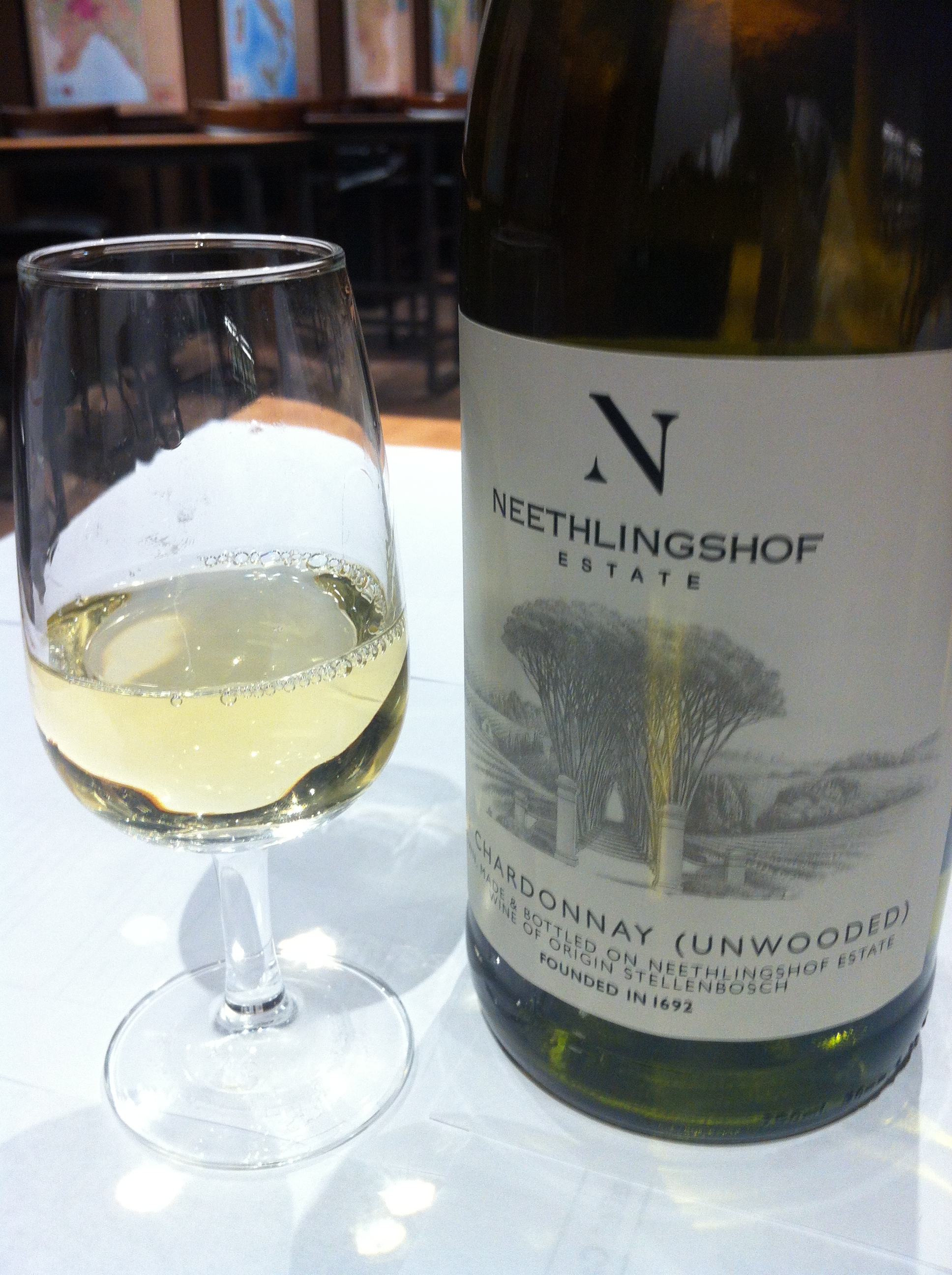
An unoaked Chardonnay from the South African wine region of Stellenbosch

Due to quarantine restrictions, plant cuttings were often smuggled into South Africa in the 1970s and 1980s and many times were misidentified as to what grape variety it really was. A large portion of the Chardonnay plantings from this period turned out to be Auxerrois blanc. A similar event happened in the German wine region of Baden during the 1980s. By the late 1990s, efforts to promote "authentic" Chardonnay helped to increase plantings and by 2004 it was the third-most widely planted white wine grape behind Chenin blanc and Colombard. Winemakers in the Western Cape have experimented blending Chardonnay with Riesling and Sauvignon blanc.

== Other wine regions ==
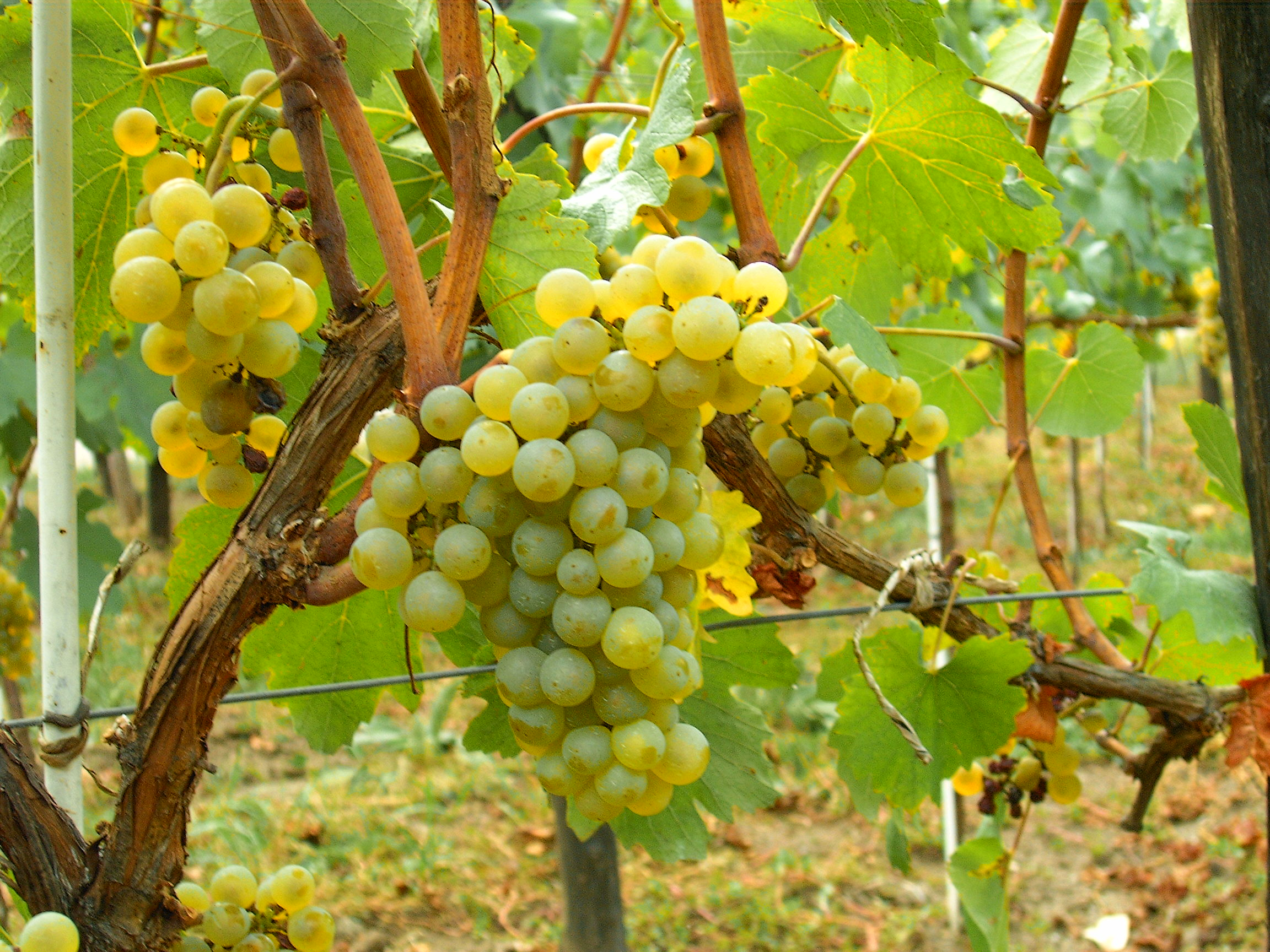
Chardonnay growing in Moldova

Outside of the regions discussed above, Chardonnay can be found in cooler climate sites in Italy, Greece, Israel and Lebanon as well as Austria, Bulgaria, Croatia, England, Georgia, Germany, Slovakia, Hungary, Macedonia, Moldova, Portugal, Romania, Slovenia, Spain, Serbia, Switzerland and Ukraine. In Austria, the grape varieties known as Feinburgunder in Burgenland & Vienna and Morillon in Styria was not identified as Chardonnay till the late 1980s. Today, Austrian Chardonnays range from the rich, oaked aged varieties to leaner, more aromatic styles based on Austrian Rieslings to sweet late harvest styles. In nearby Germany, this distinctly French wine grape was slow to gain a footing being only officially sanctioned since 1991. Today it is most commonly found in the Baden, Palatinate and Rheinhessen regions. In Switzerland, Chardonnay is found mostly around Bündner Herrschaft, Geneva and Valais. In Spain, Chardonnay has been increasingly used in the sparkling wine Cava. It is also permitted in the denominación de origen (DO) wines of Costers del Segre, Navarra and Somontano. In the wine regions of the former Soviet Union, Chardonnay has lagged behind in white wine grapes plantings in favor Rkatsiteli, Aligote and Riesling. The Portuguese experimentation with Chardonnay has been mostly influenced by flying winemakers from Australia and the examples produced so far are very New World in style.

=== New World wine regions ===
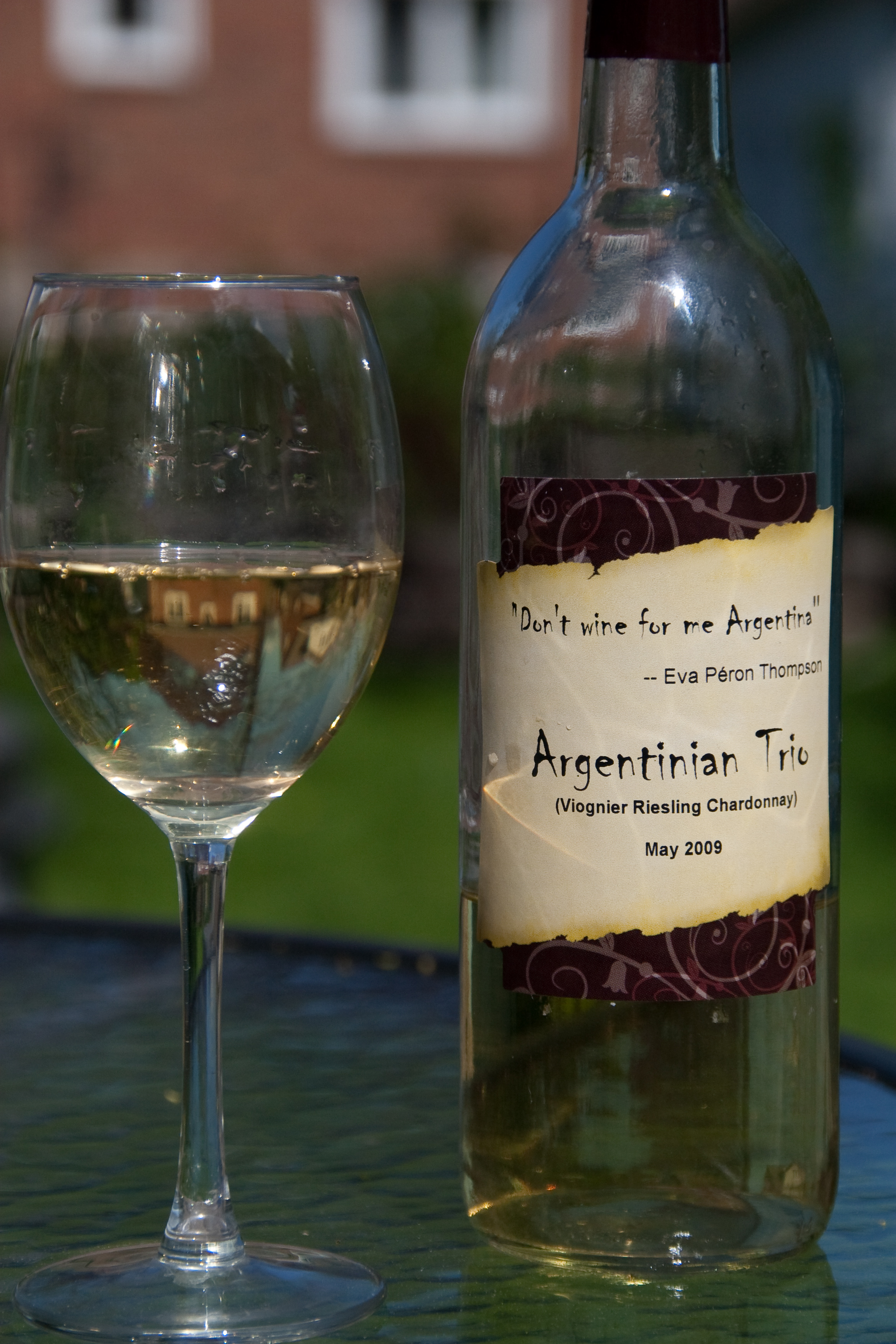
A Viognier-Riesling-Chardonnay blend from Argentina

In the cool-climate wine regions of Argentina's Uco Valley, Chardonnay has started to develop a presence. According to a 2023 report, Chardonnay is the third most widely planted white grape variety in Argentina, behind Pedro Giménez and Torrontés.

== Winemaking ==
Chardonnay lends itself to almost any style of wine making from dry still wines, to sparkling wines to sweet late harvest and even botrytized wines (though its susceptibility to other less favorable rot makes these wines rarer). The two winemaking decisions that most widely affect the result of a Chardonnay wine is whether or not to use malolactic fermentation and the degree of oak influence used for the wine. With malolactic fermentation (or MLF), the harder malic acid gets converted into the softer lactic acid, and diacetyl which creates the "buttery-ness" that is associated with some styles of Chardonnay. The wines that do not go through MLF will have more green (unripe) apple-like flavors. Oak can be introduced during fermentation or after in the form of the barrel aging. Depending on the amount of charring that the oak was treated with, this can introduce a "toastiness" and flavors that many wine drinkers mistake as a characteristic of the grape itself. These flavors can include caramel, cream, smoke, spice, coconut, cinnamon, cloves and vanilla.

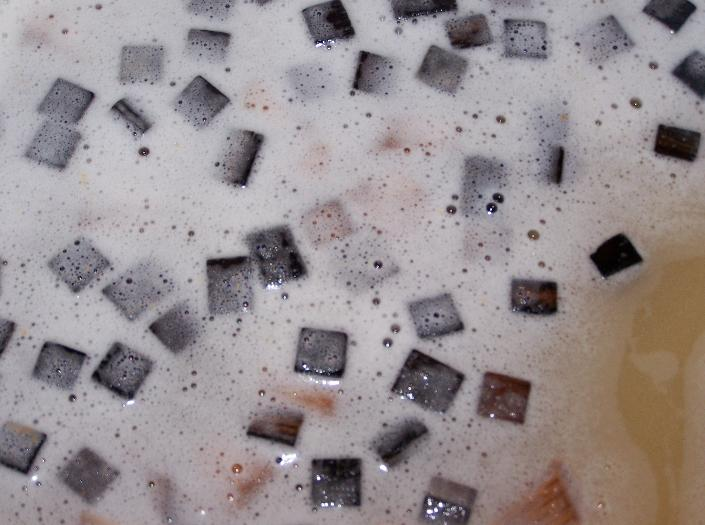
Oak chips in fermenting Chardonnay

Other winemaking decisions that can have a significant effect include the temperature of fermentation and what time, if any, that the wine allowed to spend aging on the lees. Burgundian winemaking tends to favor extended contact on the lees and even "stirring up" the lees within the wine while it is aging in the barrel in a process known as bâtonnage. Colder fermentation temperatures produce more "tropical" fruit flavors like mango and pineapple. The "Old World" style of winemaking favors the use of wild, or ambient yeast, though some will also use specially cultivated yeast that can impart aromatic qualities to the wine. A particular style of yeast used in Champagne is the Prise de Mousse that is cultivated for use worldwide in sparkling Chardonnay wines. A potential drawback of using wild yeast is that the fermentation process can go very slowly with the results of the yeasts being very unpredictable and producing potentially a very different wine each year. One Burgundian winemaker that favors the use of only wild yeast is Domaine des Comtes Lafon which had the fermentation of its 1963 Chardonnay batch take five years to complete when the fermentation process normally only takes a matter of weeks.

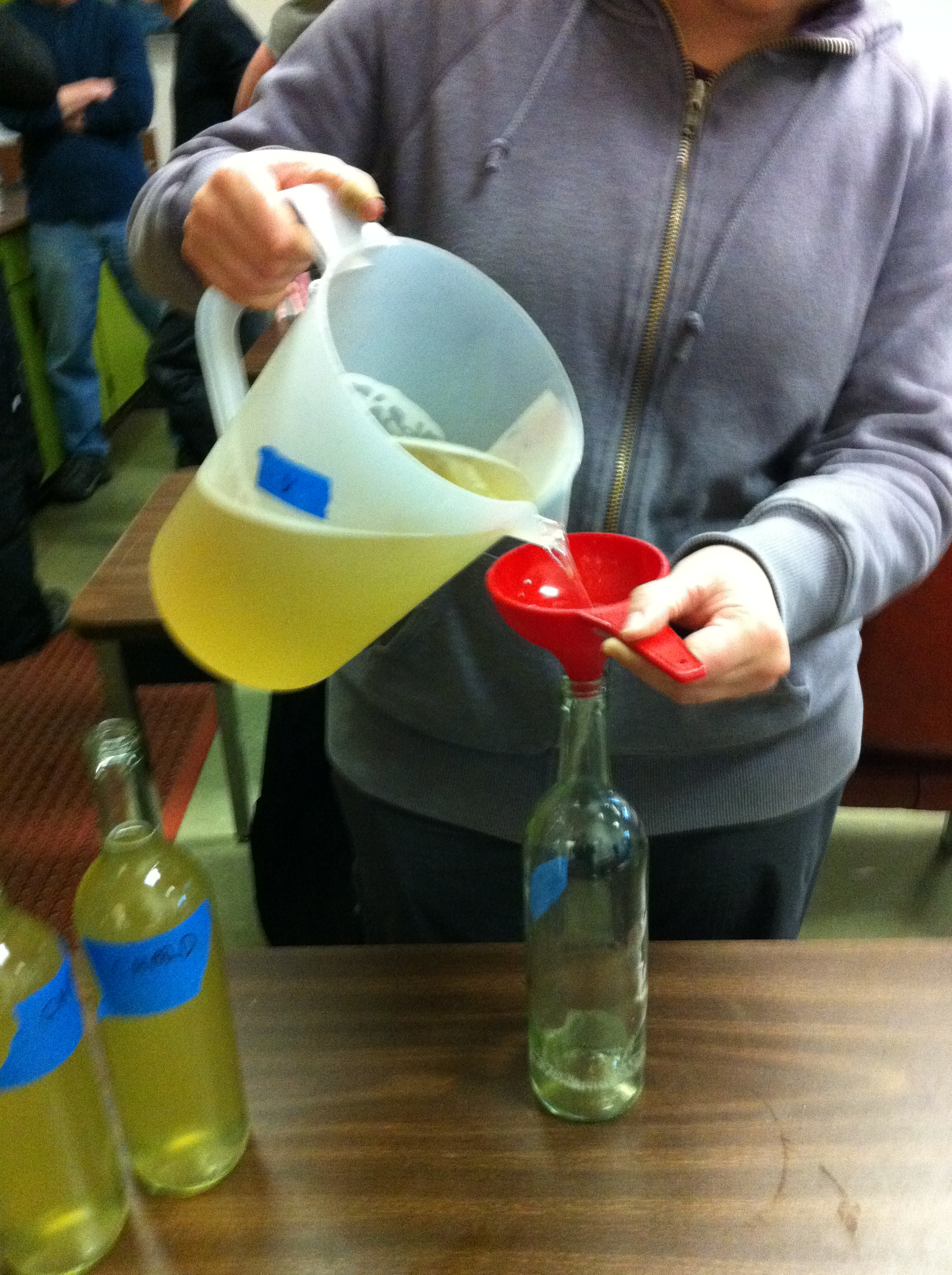
Winemaker conducting fining bench trails on Chardonnay samples

The time of harvesting is a crucial decision because the grape quickly begins to lose acidity as it ripens. For sparkling wine production, the grapes will be harvested early and slightly unripe to maintain the acid levels. Sparkling Chardonnay-based wines tend to exhibit more floral and steely flavors in their youth. As the wine ages, particularly if it spends significant time on lees, the wines will develop "toasty" notes. Chardonnay grapes usually have little trouble developing sugar content, even in cooler climates, which translates into high potential alcohol levels and limits the need for chaptalization. On the flip side, low acid levels can be a concern which make the wine taste "flabby" and dull. Winemakers can counteract this by adding tartaric acid in a process known as "acidification". In cooler climates, the extract and acidity of Chardonnay is magnified which has the potential of producing very concentrated wines that can develop through bottle aging. Chardonnay can blend well with other grapes and still maintain some of its unique character. The grapes most often blended with Chardonnay include Chenin blanc, Colombard and Sémillon.

=== Wine style ===
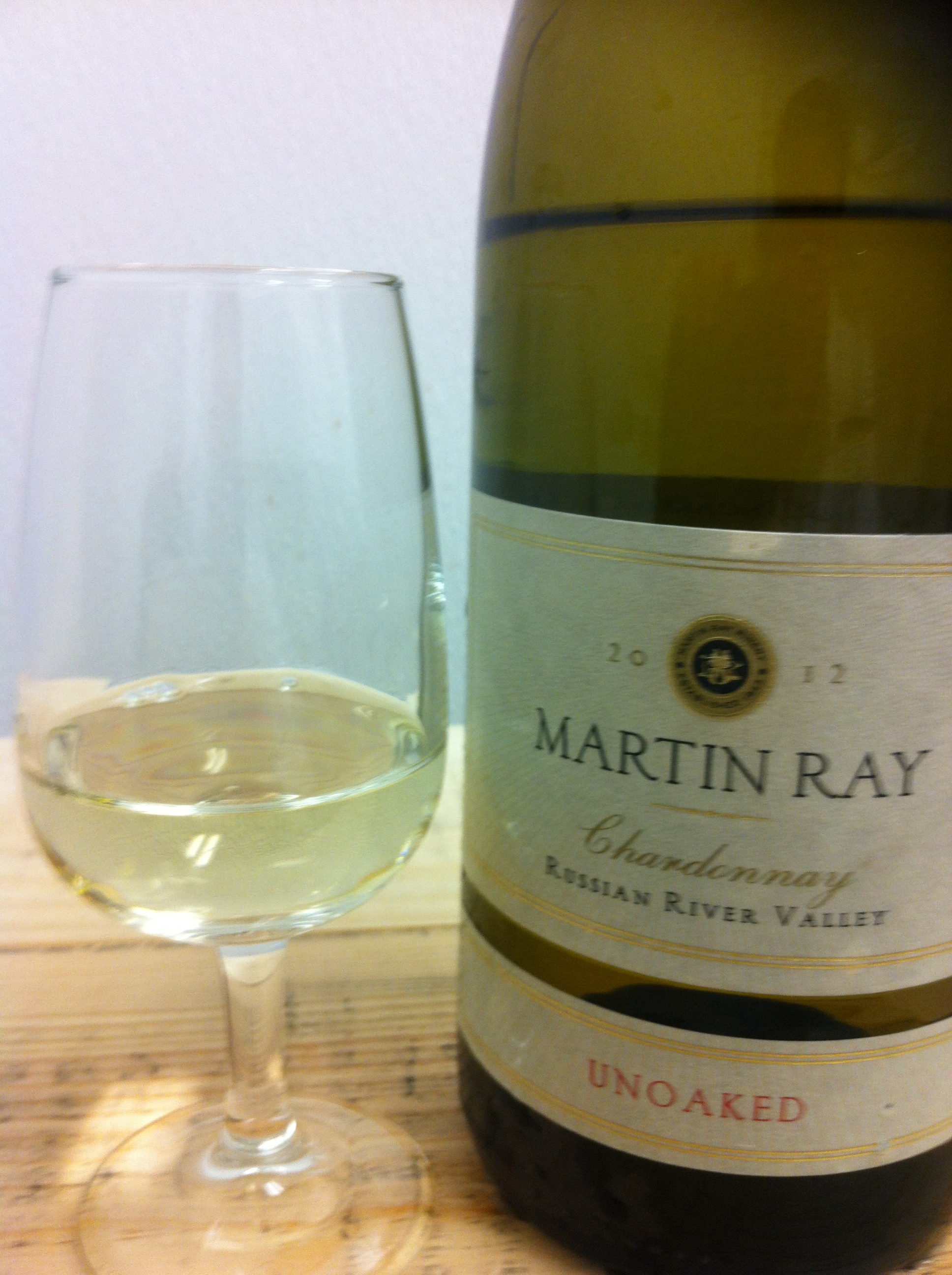
An unoaked Chardonnay from the Russian River

Due to the "malleability" of Chardonnay in winemaking and its ability to reflect its terroir, there is not one distinct universal "style" or set of constants that could be applied to Chardonnay made across the globe. According to Jancis Robinson, a sense of "smokiness" is one clue that could be picked up in a blind tasting of Chardonnay but there are many styles that do not have any "smokey" notes. Compared to other white wine grapes like Sauvignon blanc, Gewürztraminer and Viognier-Chardonnay has a more subtle and muted nose with no overwhelming aromatics that jump out of the wine glass. The identifying styles of Chardonnay are regionally based. For example, pineapple notes are more commonly associated with Chardonnay from Napa Valley while Chablis will have more notes of green apples. While many examples of Chardonnay can benefit from a few years of bottle aging, especially if they have high acidity, most Chardonnays are meant to be consumed in their youth. A notable exception to this is the most premium examples of Chablis and white Burgundies.

== With food ==
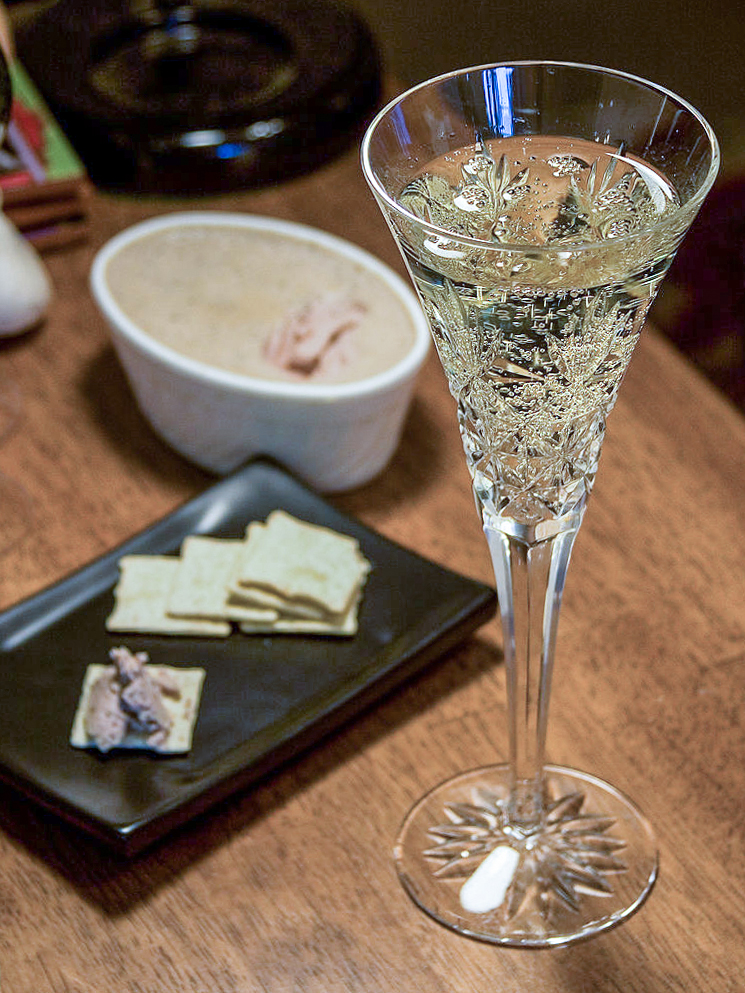
Chardonnay based Champagnes, such as blanc de blancs, can be very versatile in food pairings.

Due to the wide range of styles, Chardonnay has the potential to be paired with a diverse spectrum of food types. It is most commonly paired with roast chicken and other white meats such as turkey. Heavily-oak-influenced Chardonnays do not pair well with more delicate fish and seafood dishes. Instead, those wines tend to go better with smoked fish, spicy southeast Asian cuisine, garlic and guacamole dips. The regional influences of Chardonnay can help it pair with different food styles. Chardonnays from Washington, which is characterized by maintaining more acidity, tend to pair well with tomato-based dishes and items featuring sweet onions. Older, more mellow Chardonnays are often paired with more "earthy" dishes like mushroom soup and aged cheese.

== Popularity and backlash ==
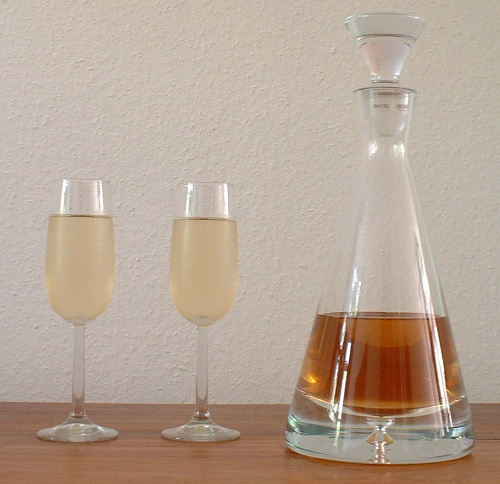
Chardonnay has become a popular component in the wine-based cocktail Kir

Chardonnay long had a reputation as one of France's great white wines, but due to the dominance of geographical labeling, the fact that Chardonnay was the grape behind white Burgundy was not widely known by the wine-drinking public. The success of California and new world Chardonnays, partly encouraged by the Californian showing at the Judgment of Paris wine tasting, brought varietal wine labeling to more prominence and the easy to pronounce Chardonnay grape was one of the largest beneficiaries. In the late 1980s, a sort of "Chardonnay-mania" developed as wine regions (particularly new and developing ones) dramatically increased their planting of the grape to meet the worldwide demand.

As more vineyards responded with massive new plantings of the variety, they found that fashions were changing again. The market was drinking more red wine, and there was a backlash against heavy, oaky, New World Chardonnays in favor of lighter wines such as Pinot grigio. There was a new fashion, "ABC" – Anything But Chardonnay, identified by Frank Prial in 1995. Another reason for the backlash was that Chardonnay was seen as a symbol of the globalization of wine, in which local grape varieties were grubbed up in favor of the big names demanded by international markets. Oz Clarke described a view of Chardonnay as "the ruthless coloniser and destroyer of the world's vineyards and the world's palates." The criticism was centered on the habits of winemakers to pull out or give up on local varieties in order to plant more Chardonnay which offered potentially more income but lack the uniqueness and character of local varieties. Examples of this occurred in south Italy and Spain when ancient Negroamaro, Primitivo, Grenache and Mataro vineyards were ripped up in favor of new Chardonnay plantings.

Chardonnay became very fashionable in the 1990s, as the stereotypical drink of young urban women of the Bridget Jones generation.

By 2002, the association of Chardonnay with suburban, unsophisticated tastes was being explored in Australian TV show Kath & Kim, where lower middle class characters mispronounce the varietal as "kardonnay".

Despite the backlash, Chardonnay remains very popular. In 2004, Chardonnay was estimated to be the world's 6th most widely grown grape variety, covering 179,300 hectares (443,000 acres).

== Genetic modification ==
With the advent of modern gene editing techniques, trials have begun to create transgenic, genetically modified Chardonnay. Some mechanisms of inserting genes or knocking out other genes to potentially change characteristics of the grape have included CRISPR-Cas9 editing, in order to allow modification of gene expression. Additional trials have also included work with plasmids to provide resistance to potential pathogens including both bacteria and fungi. Such trials have included inserting magainin for mildew resistance. Similar experimentation has also taken place for cultivars of yeast used for fermenting Chardonnay. By examining the chemicals produced by different strains of yeast during fermentation, flavor of the final wine can be modified. Trials are underway in the US and South Africa.

== Synonyms ==
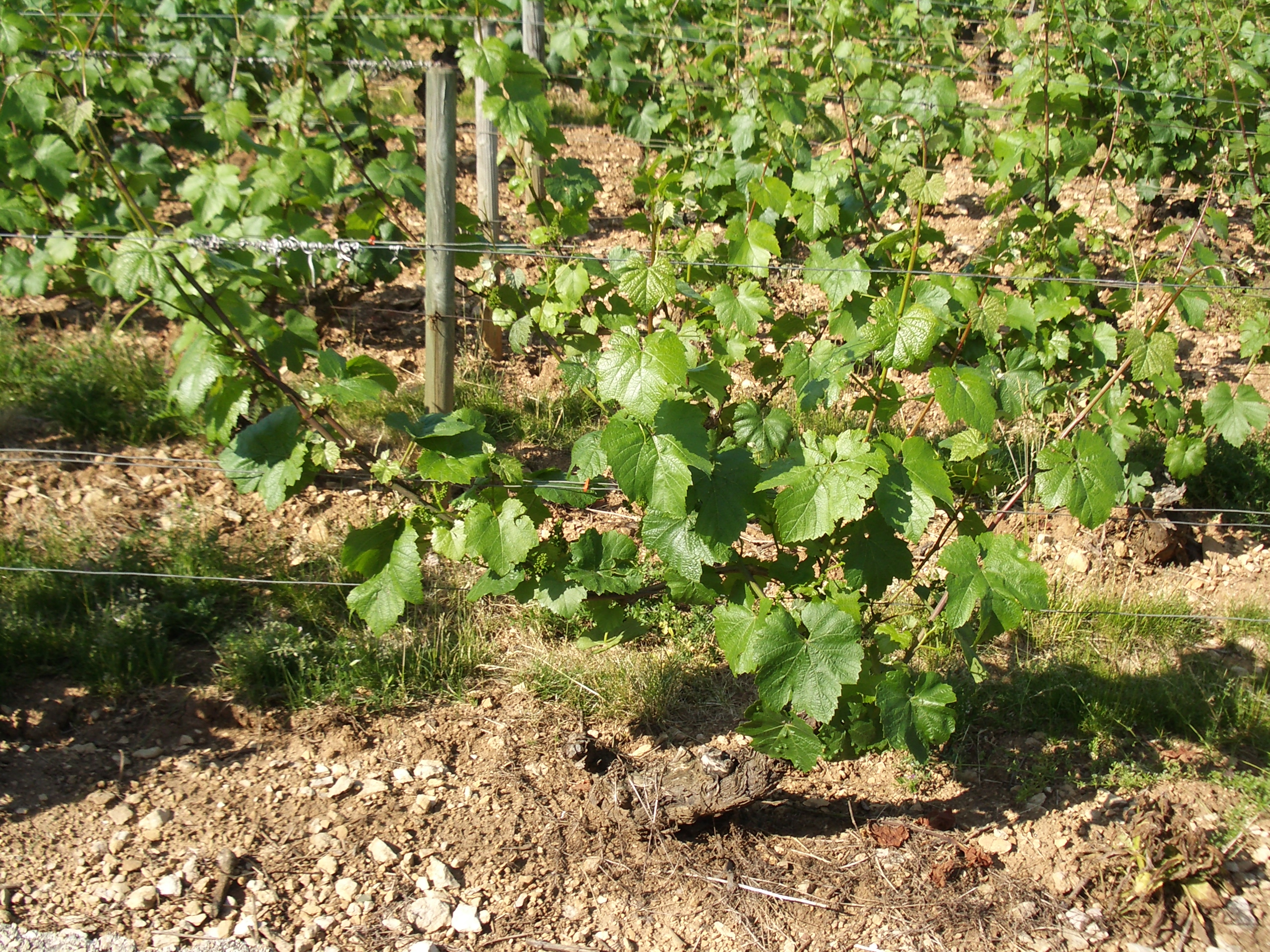
Chardonnay vines in Chassagne-Montrachet, Burgundy

Due to the worldwide recognition of the name of "Chardonnay", many of these synonyms have fallen out of favor as winemakers use the more marketable Chardonnay:

Arboisier, Arnaison blanc, Arnoison, Aubain, Aubaine, Auvergnat blanc, Auvernas, Auvernas blanc, Auvernat blanc, Auxeras, Auxerras blanc, Auxerrois blanc, Auxois, Auxois blanc, Bargeois blanc, Beaunois, Biela Klevanjika, Blanc de Champagne, Blanc de Cramant, Breisgauer Suessling, Breisgauer Sussling, Burgundi Feher, Chablis, Chardenai, Chardenay, Chardenet, Chardennet, Chardonay, Chardonnet, Chatenait, Chatey Petit, Chatte, Chaudenay, Chaudenet, Chaudent, Clävner, Clevner Weiss, Cravner, Epinette, Epinette blanc, Epinette blanche, Epinette de Champagne, Ericey blanc, Feher Chardonnay, Feherburgundi, Feinburgunder, Gamay blanc, Gelber Weissburgunder, Gentil blanc, Grosse Bourgogne, Klawner, Klevanjka Biela, Klevner, Lisant, Luisant, Luizannais, Luizant, Luzannois, Maconnais, Maurillon blanc, Melon blanc, Melon D'Arbois, Meroué, Moreau blanc, Morillon blanc, Moulon, Noirien blanc, Obaideh, Petit Chatey, Petit Sainte-Marie, Petite Sainte Marie, Pineau blanc, Pino Sardone, Pino Shardone, Pinot Blanc à Cramant, Pinot Blanc Chardonnay, Pinot Chardonnay, Pinot de Bourgogne, Pinot Giallo, Pinot Planc, Plant de Tonnerre, Romere, Romeret, Rouci Bile, Rousseau, Roussot, Ruländer Weiß, Sainte Marie Petite, Sardone, Shardone, Shardonne, Später Weiß Burgunder, Weiß Burgunder (normally refers to Pinot blanc), Weiß Clevner, Weiß Edler, Weiß Elder, Weiß Klewner, Weiß Silber, Weißedler, Weißer Clevner, Weißer Rulander.

== See also ==
- Great Chardonnay Showdown
- International variety

== Sources ==
- Robinson, Jancis, ed. (2006). The Oxford Companion to Wine, Third Edition. Oxford University Press. ISBN 0-19-860990-6.
- Oz Clarke; Margaret Rand (2001). Encyclopedia of Grapes. Harcourt Books. ISBN 0-15-100714-4.
