= Rava =

Rava may refer to:

== Biographical ==
- Bishnu Prasad Rabha, multifaceted artist and revolutionary singer of Assam
- Rava (amora) (Abba ben Joseph bar Ḥama, born 280), a Jewish Talmudist who lived in Babylonia, always known by the honorific name Raba, Rava, or Amora-Rava
- Rava (surname)

== Culinary ==
- Another name for the wine grape Ravat blanc
- Rava, also Sooji, Suji or Bombay rava an Indian term for semolina; used in making upma, rava dosa, etc.

== Geographical ==
- Rava (island), an island in the Croatian part of the Adriatic sea
- Rava-Ruska, a city in the Lviv Oblast of western Ukraine
- Rava, the Hungarian name for Roua village, Fântânele Commune, Mureș County, Romania
- Rava, Harju County, village in Kõue Parish, Harju County, Estonia
- Rava, Järva County, village in Ambla Parish, Järva County, Estonia
