= Rava (surname) =

Rava is a surname of Italian origin. People with the surname include:

- Enrico Rava (born 1939), Italian musician
- Giovanni Rava (1874–1944), Italian painter
- Luigi Rava (1860–1938), Italian politician
- Malati Rava Roy, Indian politician
- Pietro Rava (1916–2006), Italian football player
- Prithiraj Rava (born 1959), Indian politician and actor

== See also ==
- Rava (disambiguation)
