= Ravat blanc =

Variety of grape

Ravat blanc is a white hybrid grape variety that is a crossing of Chardonnay and a Seibel grape. While the Vitis International Variety Catalogue (VIVC) maintained by the Geilweilerhof Institute for Grape Breeding lists Seibel 5474 as the second parent, Master of Wine Jancis Robinson notes that other authors list Seibel 8724 as the parent. The grape is often confused with the white hybrid grape Vignoles that is often called just Ravat (or officially Ravat 51).

Created in the 1930s by French grape breeder J.F. Ravat, there were over 600 hectares (1,483 acres) of the grape planted in France in 1958. Today, the grape is more likely to be found in the United States where producers in the Finger Lakes AVA of New York use to it make sweet wines.

== History and pedigree ==
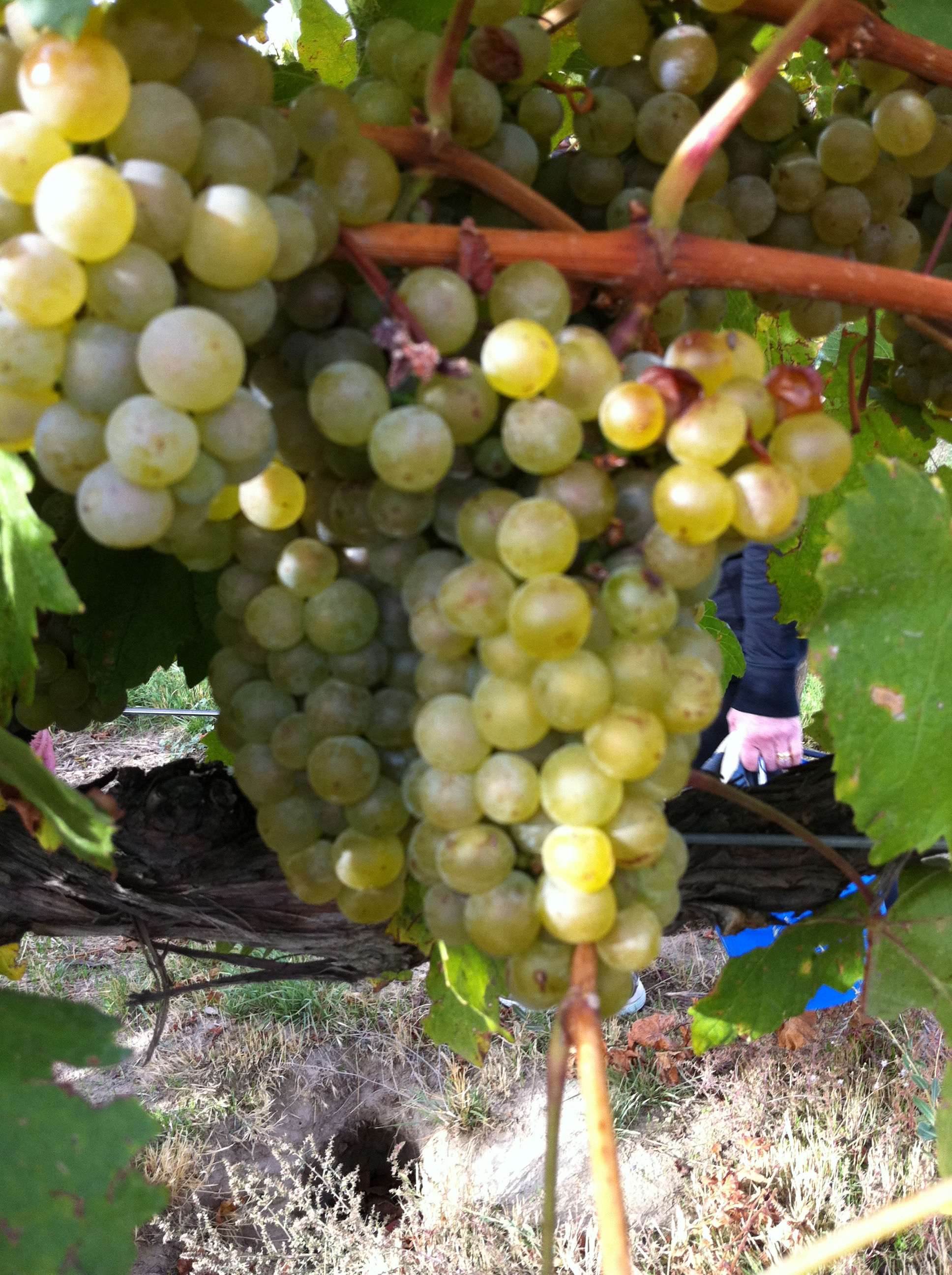
Chardonnay, one of the parent varieties of Ravat blanc.

Ravat blanc was created in the 1930s by J.F. Ravat in the commune of Marcigny in the Saône-et-Loire department of eastern France that includes the Burgundy wine region. Ravat crossed the Vitis vinifera Chardonnay grape with a hybrid Seibel grape (either Seibel 5474 or Seibel 8724) created by the French viticulturist Albert Seibel. This lineage makes Ravat blanc a "complex" hybrid in that its pedigree includes genes from several Vitis species.

Seibel 5474 (the parent vine recognized by the VIVC) is itself a complex hybrid crossing of Seibel 405 and Seibel 867. In Seibel 405's lineage are vines from the Vitis rupestris and Vitis aestivalis species while Seibel 867 is a crossing of two other complex hybrids, Noah (which has Vitis riparia and Vitis labrusca in its lineage) and Vivarais (also known as Seibel 2003 which is a crossing of Munson and Herbmont d'Aurelles).

The grape was widely planted after its release with more than 600 hectares (1,483 acres) of the variety reported in France in 1958. But the low quality of the grape's wine, the vine's low fertility and its susceptibility to a number of viticultural hazards (including powdery mildew) lead to a sharp drop in plantings and by 2008 there was 7 hectares (17 acres) of the grape left in France.

== Viticulture ==
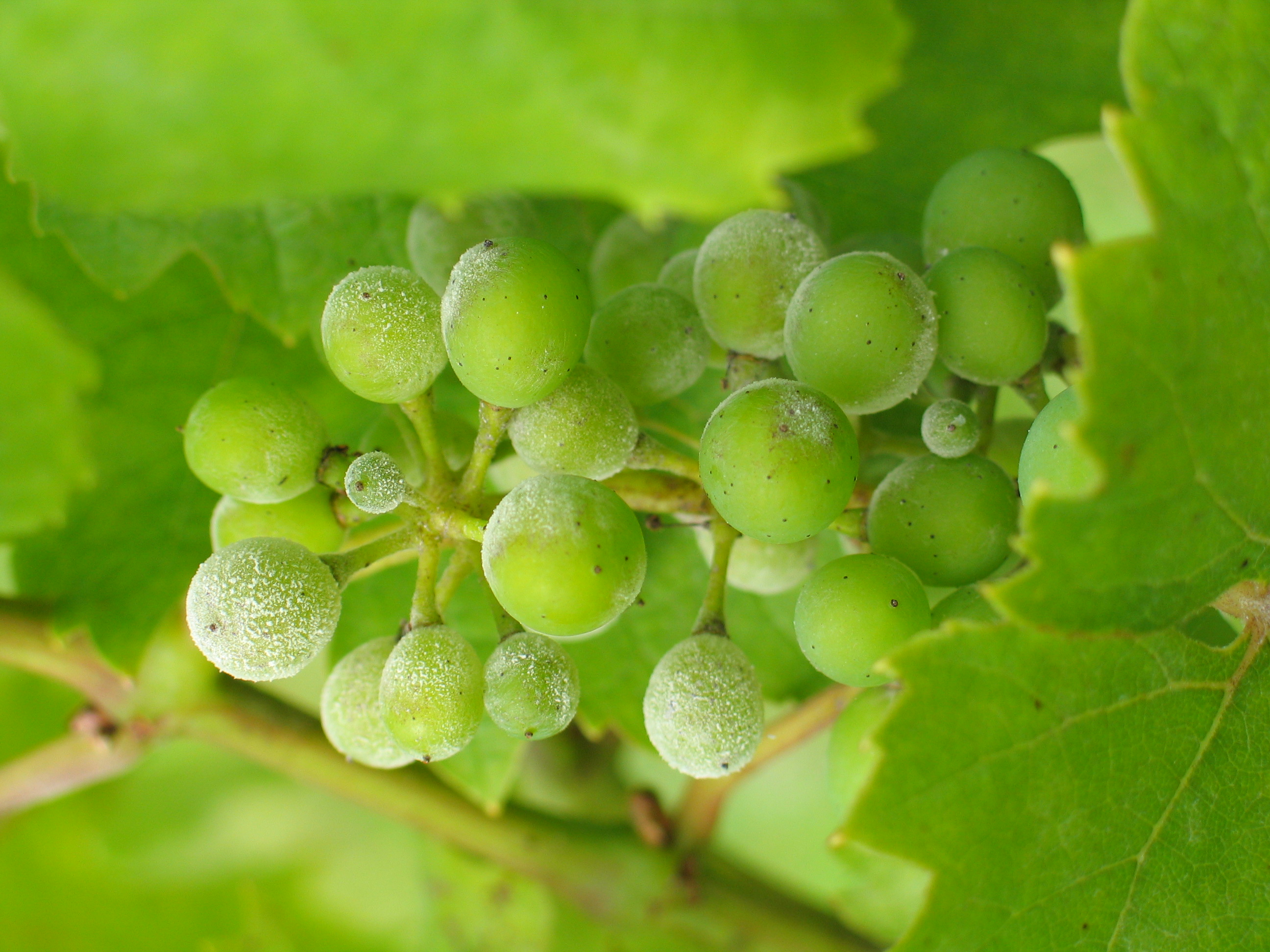
Ravat blanc is susceptible to the fungal infection powdery mildew (picture).

Ravat blanc is a mid-ripening grape variety that buds which can leave it susceptible to early spring frosts. While the vine has some resistance to downy mildew, it is a very susceptible to a number of viticultural hazards including anthracnose, botrytis bunch rot and powdery mildew. Ravat blanc tends to produce small bunches of berries that can turn slightly pink after veraison when fully ripe.

== Wine regions ==
While once widely planted in France, today there is only 7 ha (17 acres). Most of these plantings are in the Rhone valley where Domaine Mondon-Demeuré has Ravat blanc planted in a vineyard with other rare varieties just northwest of the commune of Saint-Étienne. As the grape does not qualify for any Appellation d'Origine Contrôlée (AOC) designation, the varietal wine that Domaine Mondon-Demeuré produces from Ravat blanc is labeled only as a vin de France.

Outside France the grape is more readily found in the United States where wineries such as Bully Hill Vineyards in the Fingers Lake AVA of New York State use the grape to sweet wines.

== Synonyms ==
Over the years Ravat blanc has been known under a variety of synonyms including: Rava 6, Ravat 6, Ravat Chardonnay, Ravat Chardonnay 6, Ravat Chardonnay B.
