= List of Appellation d'Origine Contrôlée liqueurs and spirits =

The following is a list of French liqueurs and spirits that are entitled to use the designation Appellation d'Origine Contrôlée (AOC) on their label.

The majority are brandies and eaux-de-vie forming part of the Cognac and Armagnac appellations. Additional appellations cover apple-based cider, pommeau and Calvados, and the rums of Martinique.

See also List of Appellation d'Origine Contrôlée wines.

AOC	Drink	Region
Armagnac	brandy	Armagnac
Armagnac-Tenarèze	brandy	Armagnac
Bas-Armagnac	brandy	Armagnac
Blanche Armagnac	brandy	Armagnac
Bois Ordinaire	brandy	Cognac
Bons Bois	brandy	Cognac
Borderies	brandy	Cognac
Calvados	apple brandy	Normandy
Calvados Pays d'Auge	apple brandy	Normandy
Calvados Domfrontais	apple brandy	Normandy
Cognac	brandy	Cognac
Cornouaille	cider	Brittany
Esprit de Cognac	brandy	Cognac
Fine Champagne	brandy	Cognac
Fins Bois	brandy	Cognac
Grande Champagne	brandy	Cognac
Haut-Armagnac	brandy	Armagnac
Kirsch de Fougerolle	kirsch	Franche-Comté
Martinique	rum	Martinique
Pays d'Auge	cider	Normandy
Petite Champagne	brandy	Cognac
Pineau des Charentes	apéritif	Charente
Pommeau de Bretagne	pommeau	Brittany
Pommeau de Normandie	pommeau	Normandy
