= Baco blanc =

Variety of grape

- Grape (Vitis)
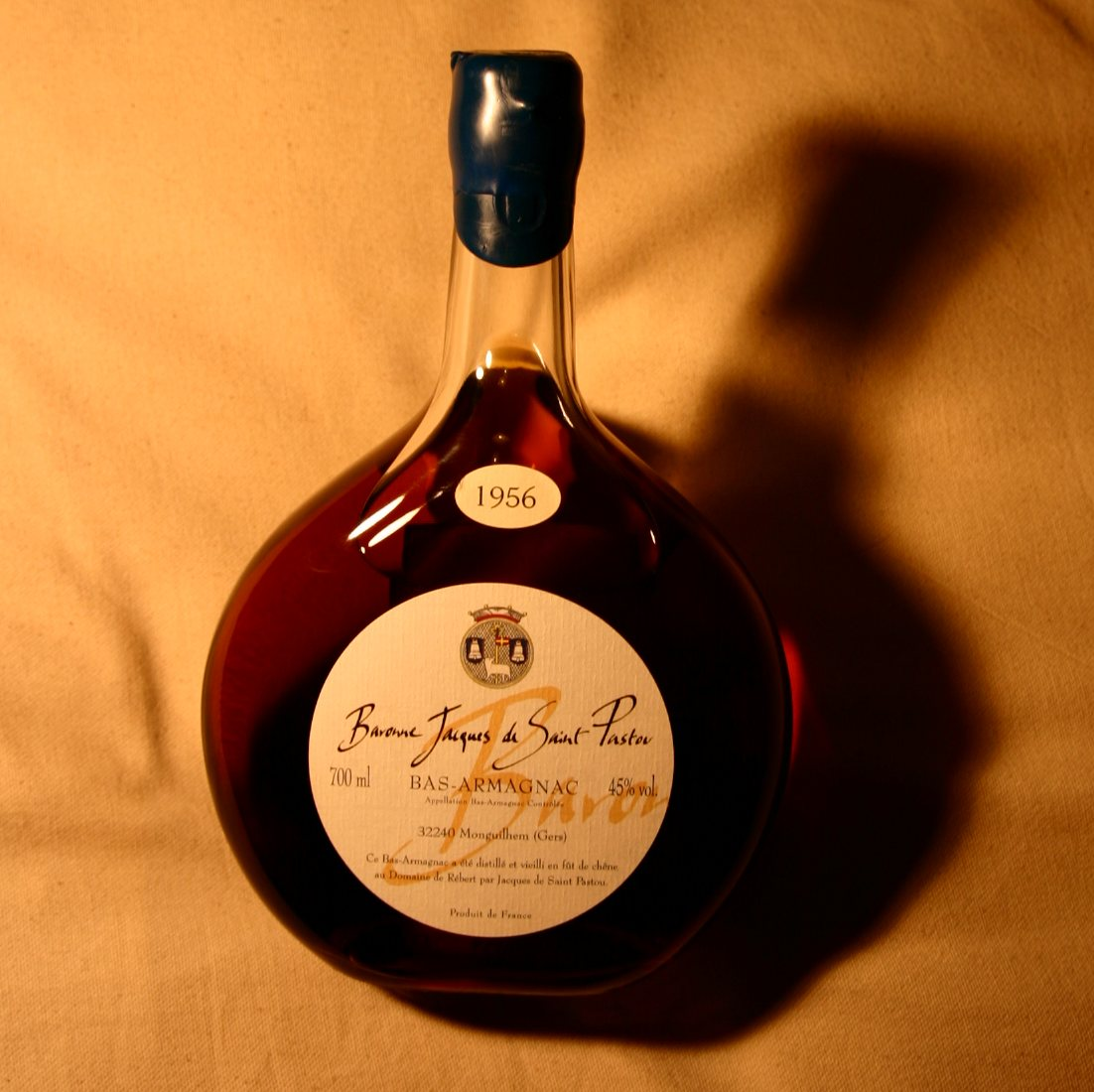
- A bottle of 1956 Armagnac made when Baco blanc was the primary grape variety of the region
- Color of berry skin: Blanc
- Species: Interspecific crossing (French-American hybrid)
- Also called: see list of synonyms
- Notable wines: Armagnac
- VIVC number: 868

Baco blanc or Baco 22A is a French-American hybrid grape variety. It is a cross of Folle blanche and the Noah grape, created in 1898 by the grape breeder François Baco. Folle blanche is its Vitis vinifera parent. Noah, its other parent, is itself a cross of Vitis labrusca and Vitis riparia.

Baco blanc was developed to produce some of the same flavors as Folle blanche but without the susceptibility to American grape disease and phylloxera. In the 20th century it was widely planted in the Gascony region for uses in brandy production. Both Armagnac and Cognac (from the Charentes and Charente-Maritime districts north of Gascony) are brandies made from white grapes – Ugni blanc, Folle blanche and Colombard – but only Armagnac was permitted under French regulations to use Baco blanc and until the late 1970s, Baco blanc was the primary grape of Armagnac.

Following the grape's decline in the late 20th century, there was some speculation about the future of the variety, especially after a 1992 Institut National des Appellations d'Origine (INAO) decree that all vines of Baco blanc were to be uprooted by 2010. However, advocates for the grape variety and its historical role in Armagnac were able to persuade French authorities to continue permitting its use in the distilled wines from the Armagnac region.

== History and parentage ==
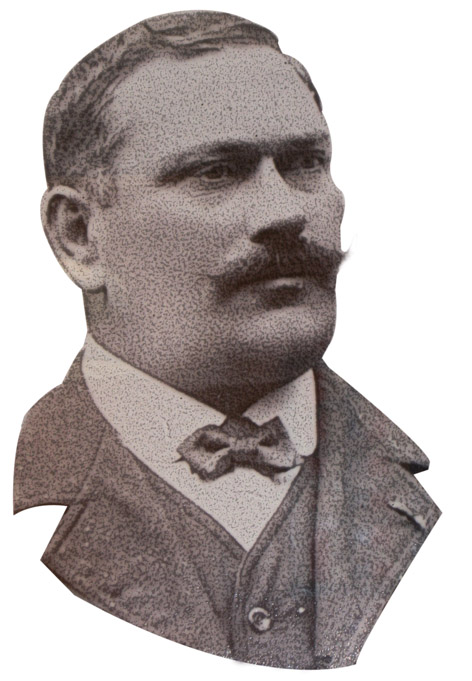
François Baco, the breeder of Baco blanc.

Baco blanc was bred in 1898 by French grape breeder François Baco from a crossing of the Vitis vinifera Folle blanche, which was having difficulties taking to the rootstock grafting after the phylloxera epidemic of the mid to late 19th century, and the American hybrid grape Noah (itself a previous crossing of an unknown Vitis labrusca species and the Vitis riparia grape Taylor). Four years earlier, François Baco had used Folle blanche and an unknown species of Vitis riparia to produce a dark skin version of Baco blanc known as Baco noir.

Prior to Baco noir's development, Folle blanche was the primarily grape variety for the eau de vie grape brandies produced in the Cognac and Armagnac regions of France. But, in addition to its difficulties with the new American rootstock, the grape was highly susceptible to several grape diseases including grey rot in the Cognac region and black rot in Armagnac. The aim of François Baco was to produce a grape that had many of the neutral flavors and characteristics which made Folle blanche favorable for distillation but without the susceptibility that had plagued Folle Blanche growers. While growers in the Cognac region began adopting Ugni blanc (the same grape known in Italy as Trebbiano), growers in the Armagnac region began to enthusiastically plant Baco's new white hybrid.

For most of the 20th century, Baco blanc was the primary grape of the Armagnac region. Its reached it peak in the 1970s when more than 85% of all plantings in the area were Baco blanc, accounting for more than 10,700 hectares (26,000 acres). However, as Ugni blanc began gaining more of a foothold in other Gascon wine regions, the plantings of Baco blanc began to gradually decline. By the end of the 20th century, Ugni blanc had eclipsed Baco blanc as the most widely planted grape in Armagnac.

This decline led to some speculation about the future of the variety, especially after a 1992 (INAO) decree that all vines of Baco blanc were to be uprooted by 2010. However, advocates for the grape variety and its historical role in Armagnac were able to persuade French authorities to continue permitting its use in the distilled wines from the Armagnac region. While far from its early to mid-20th century prominence, the variety continues to play an important role in the Armagnac region and, as of 2005, the Bureau National Interprofessionnel de L'Armagnac (BNIA) reported that the grape variety was still used in the production of nearly half of all Armagnac.

== Wine regions ==
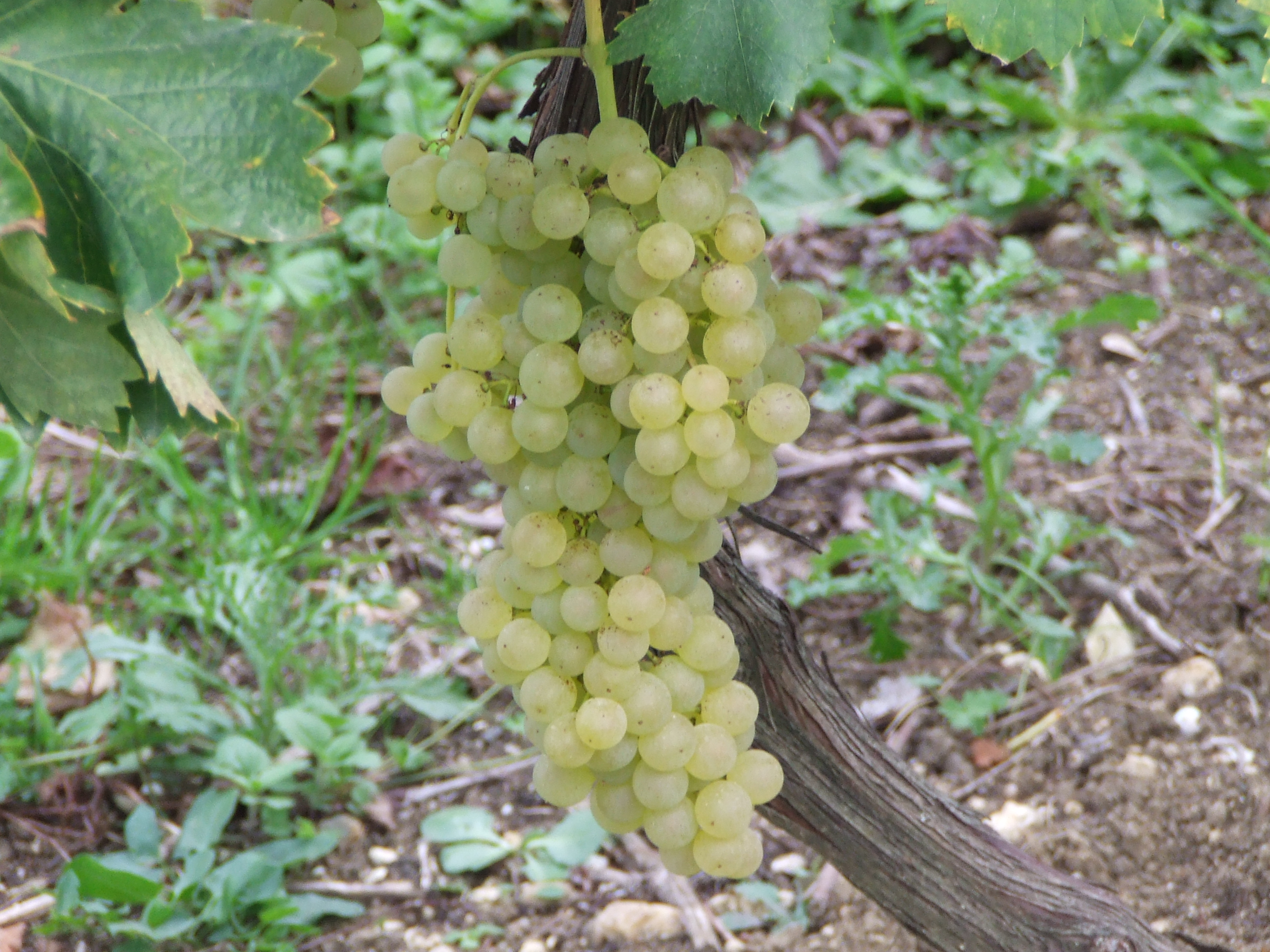
Since the end of the 20th century, Baco blanc has been falling out of favor as more growers replant with Ugni blanc (pictured) and other varieties.

Baco blanc is found primarily in France and was one of the "work-horse" hybrids that the country turned to following the phylloxera epidemic of the late 19th century. While scattered plantings could be found throughout France, most of the Baco blanc plantings could be found on the west side of the country (in many of the areas where its parent vine, Folle blanche is found, from the South West France wine regions of Gascony all the way to the Loire Valley where it was particularly popular Muscadet and Anjou wine-Saumur regions of the "Middle Loire". The early to the mid-20th century saw a particular "boom period" in the Loire, with its cool maritime climate in most areas, for hybrid varieties. At late as 1979, Baco blanc along with other hybrid grapes such as Baco noir, Chambourcin, Plantet and Villard noir accounting for more than 10% of all grape plantings.

But since the mid to late 20th century, the grape variety has fallen out of favor among French wine producers who are continuing pulling up their hybrid grapes and returning to vinifera-only plantings (which are permitted for Appellation d'Origine Contrôlée AOC wines). Even in its Armagnac stronghold, Baco blanc vines are being uprooted and replanted with Ugni blanc. Similarly, Baco blanc experienced a brief period of popularity in the emerging New Zealand wine industry during the 20th century but as that century drew to a close, New Zealand producers also turned away from the variety to concentrate on vinifera grapes such as Müller-Thurgau, Chardonnay and Sauvignon blanc. Today, what little Baco blanc is left in New Zealand is used primarily for distillations and spirits.

== Viticulture and wine styles ==
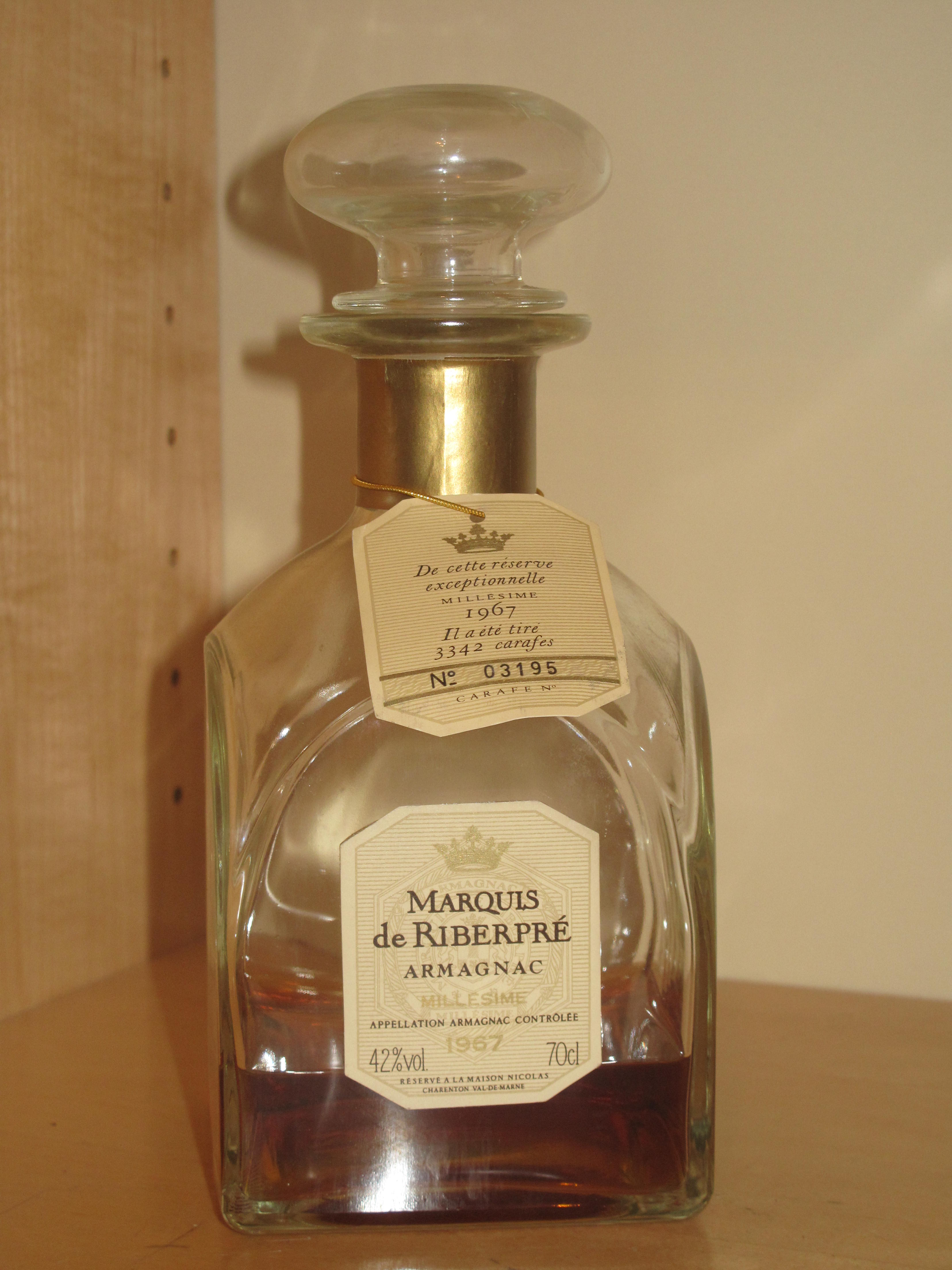
A 1967 bottle of Armagnac

While Baco blanc does not share Folle blanche's sensitivities to grey and black grape rots, it can be susceptible to powdery mildew. This susceptibility is enhanced due to the tendency of Baco blanc vines to bud early and ripen late, putting them at risk to rain and moisture of both early spring and early harvest time. However, while its growing season cycle doesn't bode well for wine production, its tendency to produce high acid, neutral flavor grapes with low sugars does work well for distillation.

According to Master of Wine Jancis Robinson, grape-based spirits made from Baco blanc often are not as fine and complex as those made from Folle blanche or Ugni blanc. But they do have a tendency to age quickly, which creates a market for brandies meant for near-term consumption.

== Synonym ==
Baco blanc and its wines are known under a variety of synonyms including 22 A Baco, Baco 22 A, Baco 22-A, Baco 221, Maurice Baco, and Piquepoul de Pays.
