= Vin de liqueur =

French wine

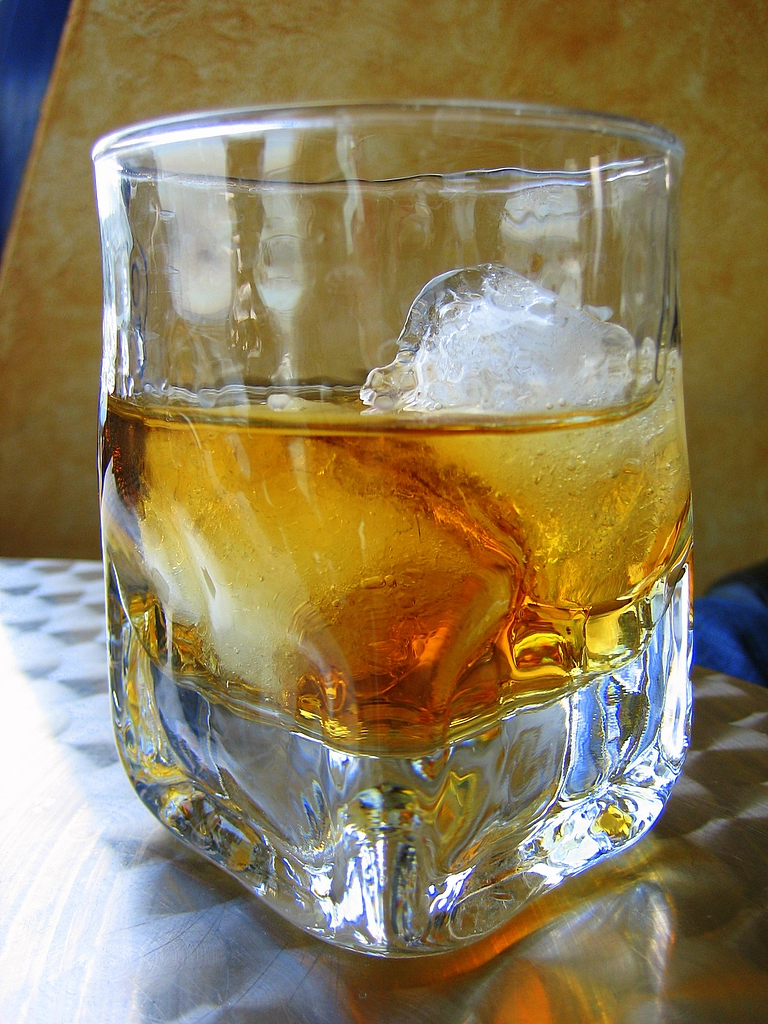
Vin de liqueur

A vin de liqueur (French) or mistela (Spanish) is a sweet fortified style of French wine and Spanish wine that is fortified with brandy to unfermented grape must. The term vin de liqueur is also used by the European Union to refer to all fortified wines.

These wines are similar to vins doux naturels but are sweeter and have more flavor influence from the added brandy. A vin de liqueur is usually served as an apéritif.

== Production ==
The unfermented grape must is fortified with brandy until the solution reaches an alcohol level of 16%–22%. The resulting wine is left with a high level of residual sugar because most strains of yeast cannot reproduce at such a high alcohol level.

Vins de liqueur are available in many regional styles and varieties of grape. Grapes from the Champagne region are used for the production of ratafia. The Rhône region makes a wine known as rinquinquin, and the Languedoc region produces a local vin de liqueur that is called cartagène. The Jura wine region produces a vin de liqueur called Macvin du Jura.

Most regions that have characteristic brandies also produce related fortified wines: the Pineau des Charentes is fortified with cognac, and the Floc de Gascogne with armagnac.
