= Pineau des Charentes =

Regional aperitif of western France

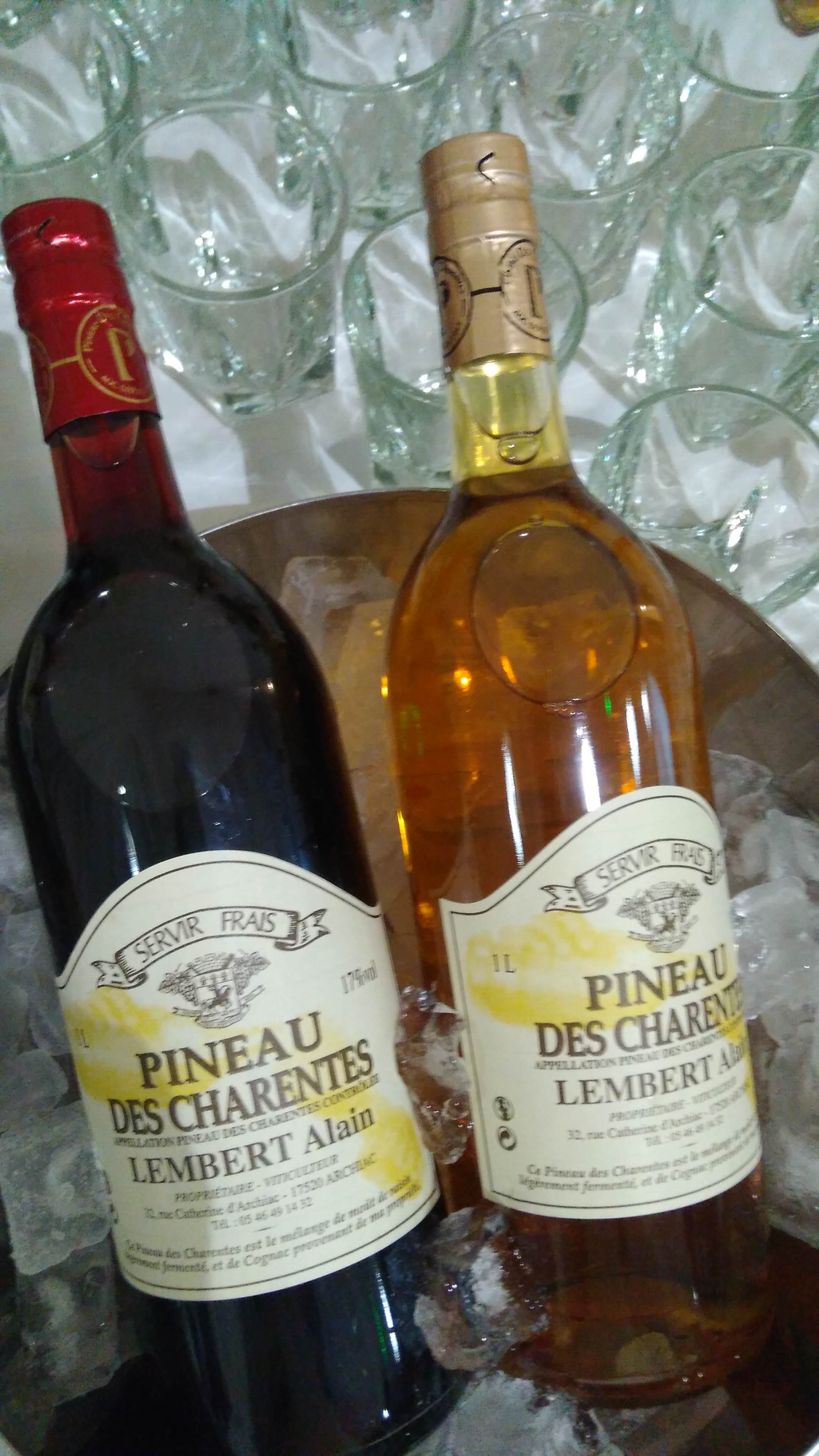
Pineau des Charentes red and Pineau des Charentes white

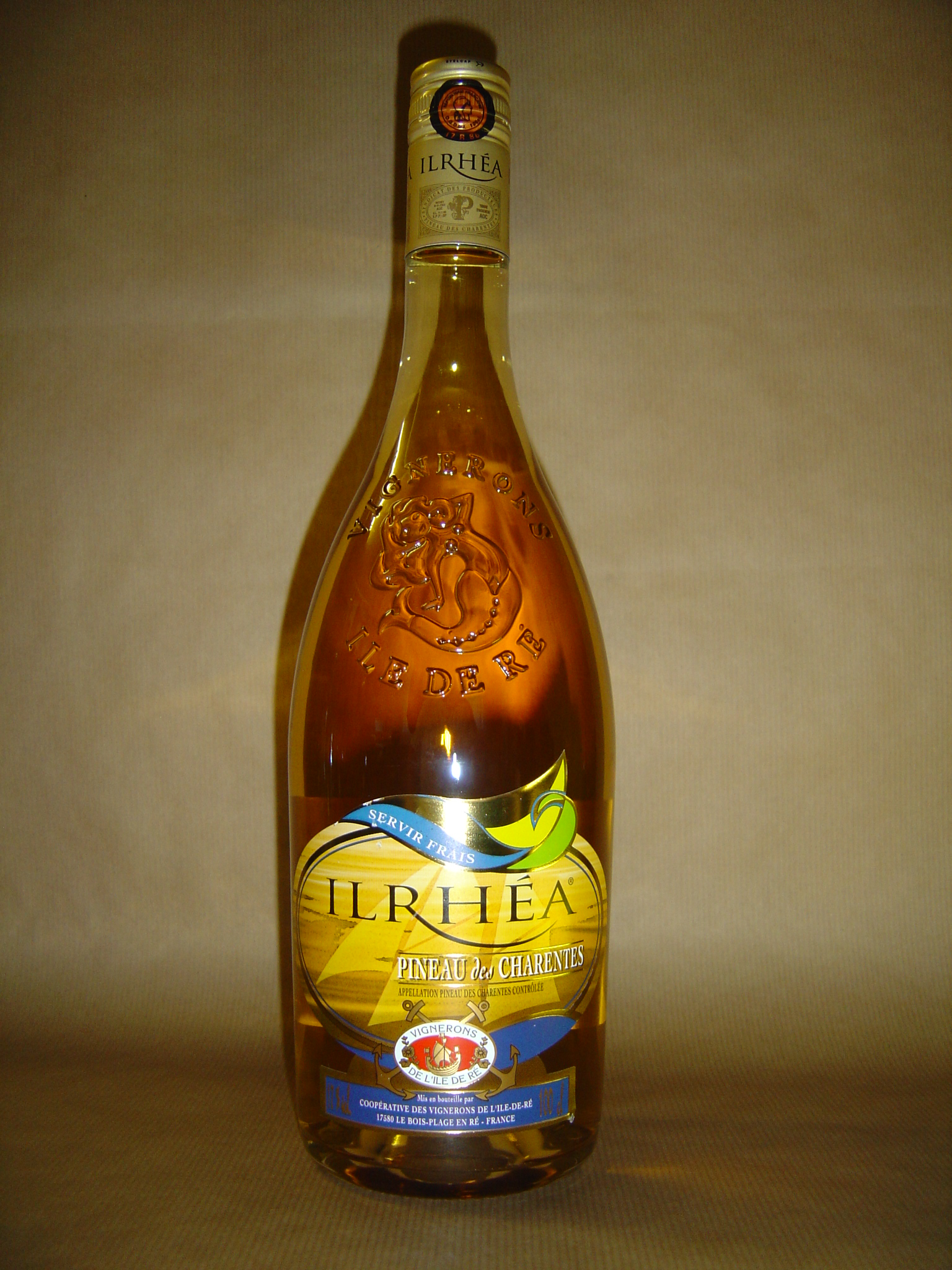
A bottle of Pineau des Charentes

Pineau des Charentes (French pronunciation: [pino de ʃaʁɑ̃t]; Pineau Charentais, or simply Pineau) is a regional aperitif of western France, made in the départements of Charente, Charente-Maritime, and (to a lesser extent) Dordogne. While popular within its region of production, it is less well known in other regions of France and somewhat uncommon abroad.

It is a fortified wine (mistelle or vin de liqueur), made from either fresh, unfermented grape juice or a blend of lightly fermented grape must, to which a Cognac eau-de-vie is added and then matured.

Pineau is also found as a home-made product in the neighbouring Deux-Sèvres and Vendée départements. There is also a similar drink called "Troussepinette" that is made in the Vendée, which is often flavoured with pine or fruits such as pear. Elsewhere in France analogous drinks are made (Macvin in Jura, Floc de Gascogne in the Armagnac area; there is also Pommeau, similarly made by blending apple juice and apple brandy), but these products are much less well known nationally and internationally than Pineau.

== History ==
According to legend, during the harvest of 1589, a winemaker accidentally added grape must into a barrel that he believed was empty but in fact contained eau de vie. The mixture was duly returned to the cellars for fermentation. A few years later, the barrel was retrieved and was found to contain the drink that is now associated with the region of Charente. In 1921, a winemaker from Burie (Charente-Maritime), Emile Daud and P&C, commercialised the drink.

== Varieties ==
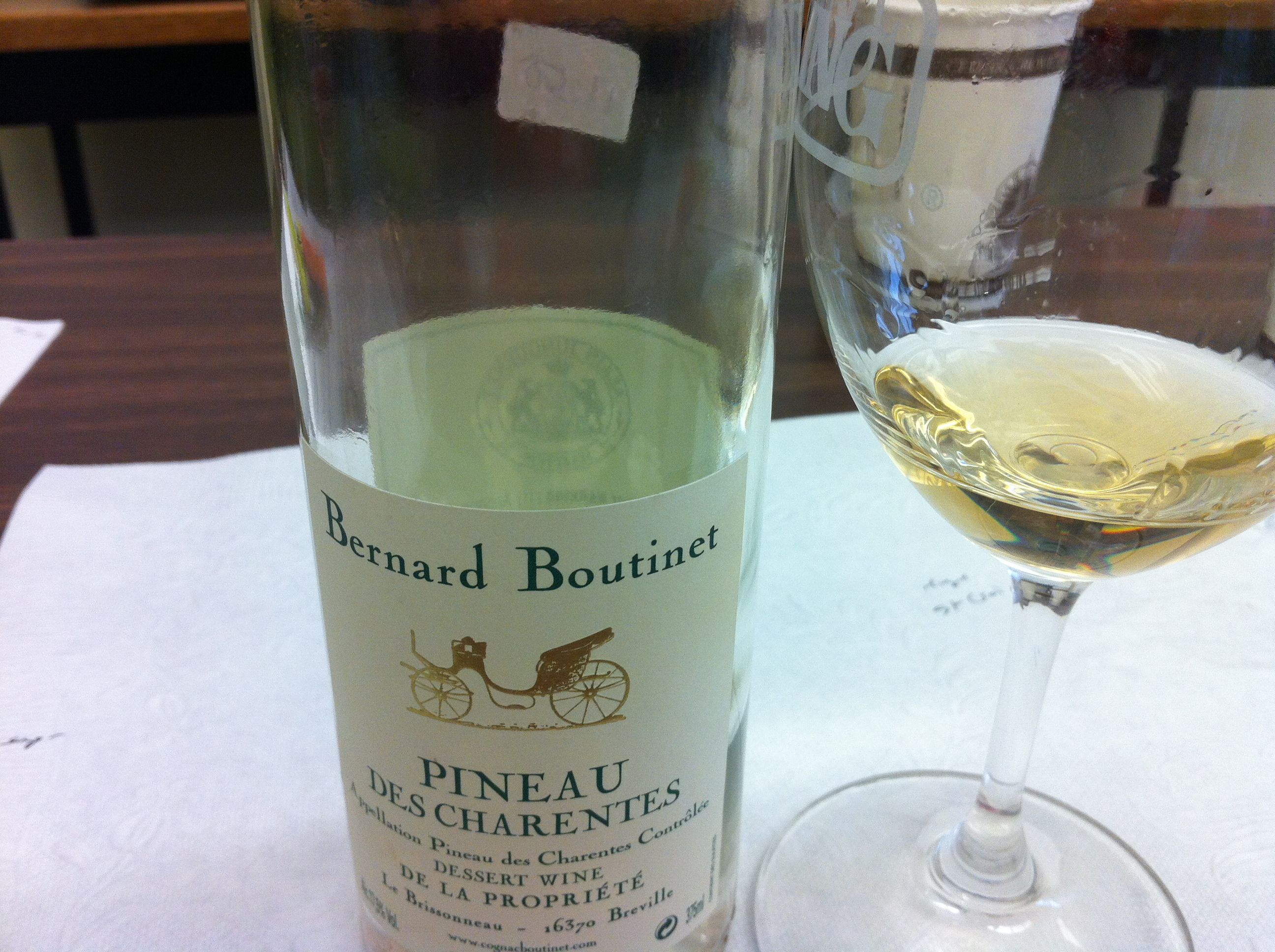
A white Pineau des Charentes.

=== White pineau ===
The dominant white variety of pineau is made using the grapes Ugni blanc, Folle blanche and Colombard, with occasional Sémillon, Sauvignon blanc and Montils. The mixture is aged for at least 18 months, including a minimum of 8 months in oak barrels. It is typically two years old when bottled.

The resulting drink is between 16% and 22% ABV (but in commercial practice nearly always 17%) and is traditionally a deep gold in color, but colors and qualities vary from vineyard to vineyard, depending on the lie of the land, the soil composition and the grape used. The taste is predominantly sweet, but is balanced by both acidity and the increased level of alcohol.

Finer varieties are aged for over 5 years in barrel, and often for several decades. After 5 years, it is called vieux pineau, and if barrel aged for more than 10 years, très vieux pineau. Très vieux pineau is more of a rarity, given its more stringent quality and maturation standards. Before these age designations can be used on the label, an examining commission must certify both the duration of aging and the finished product.

=== Red/rosé pineau ===
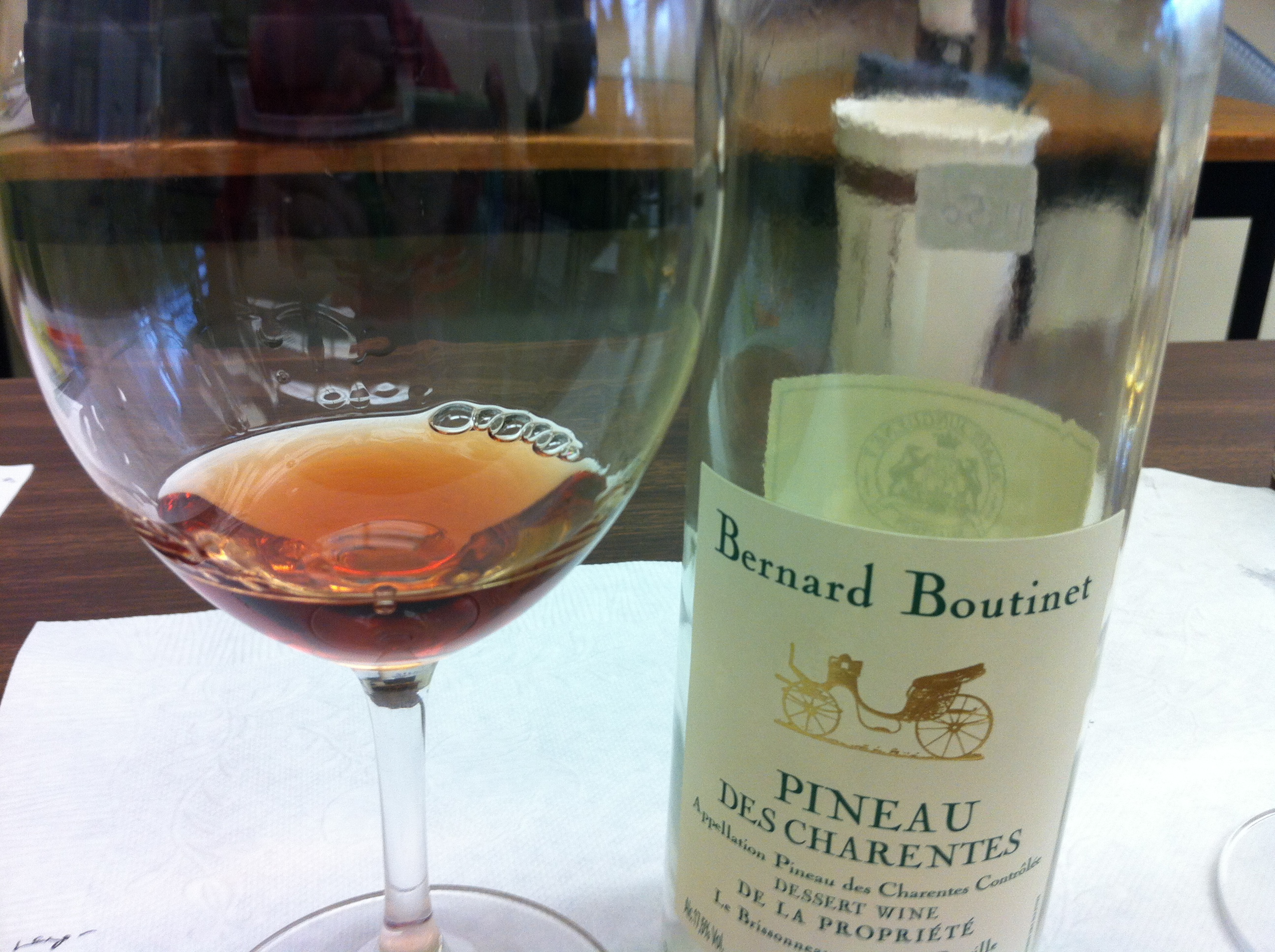
A red Pineau des Charentes.

The red and rosé varieties, very popular locally, are made from the grapes Cabernet Franc, Cabernet Sauvignon, and Merlot, and are aged for at least 14 months, including a minimum of 8 months in oak barrels. The finished drink is again between 16% and 22% ABV (usually 17%) and varies between a deep mahogany brown colour and a very dark pink.

== Production ==
The annual production of pineau is around 14,000,000 litres. Around 80% of this is made in the Charente-Maritime département. Its production is controlled under the Appellation d'Origine Contrôlée 'vin de liqueur' classification, though it is not a wine in the ordinary sense. In principle the same producer grows the grapes, makes the wine and distills it into brandy, presses the fresh grape juice and then blends and matures the result. The geographical zone authorized for the production of Pineau des Charentes AOC is practically identical with that for Cognac, and in fact many of the artisanal producers of pineau (numbering several hundred) also sell their own Cognac.

When a good harvest is expected, the best grapes may be picked by hand, however most producers harvest most of their crop mechanically. Very strict rules and formulae for the ratios of brandy and fresh grape juice are followed by each vintner and the process is even more tightly controlled for organic producers. The year of the pineau depends on the year of the eau de vie and not on the grape juice, as the juice must be freshly squeezed from freshly picked grapes – literally squeezed and mixed the same day as harvesting.

The act of mixing the eau de vie with the fresh grape juice is referred to as "assemblage", assembly or blending. It stops the fermentation of the grape must through a process called "mutage".

An increasing number of vineyards in the area now produce and sell pineau in which both the grape juice and the brandy come from organically-grown grapes. Their products have certification.

== Storing and serving ==
Like other fortified wines such as Sherry, Pineau des Charentes does not benefit from aging. However, storing unopened bottles away from sources of light will do no harm to the wine, although bottles should be stored upright to reduce the exposed surface area. Once opened, Pineau des Charentes will keep for some time in the refrigerator.

Pineau des Charentes should be served chilled (8–10 °C) in a tulip-shaped glass such as a sherry glass. The taper of this type of glass better enhances the aroma of the wine.

== See also ==
- French wine
