= Floc de Gascogne =

French fortified sweet wine

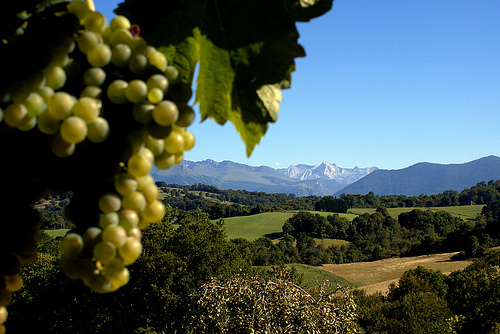
A bunch of gros manseng grapes with Jurançon in the back drop

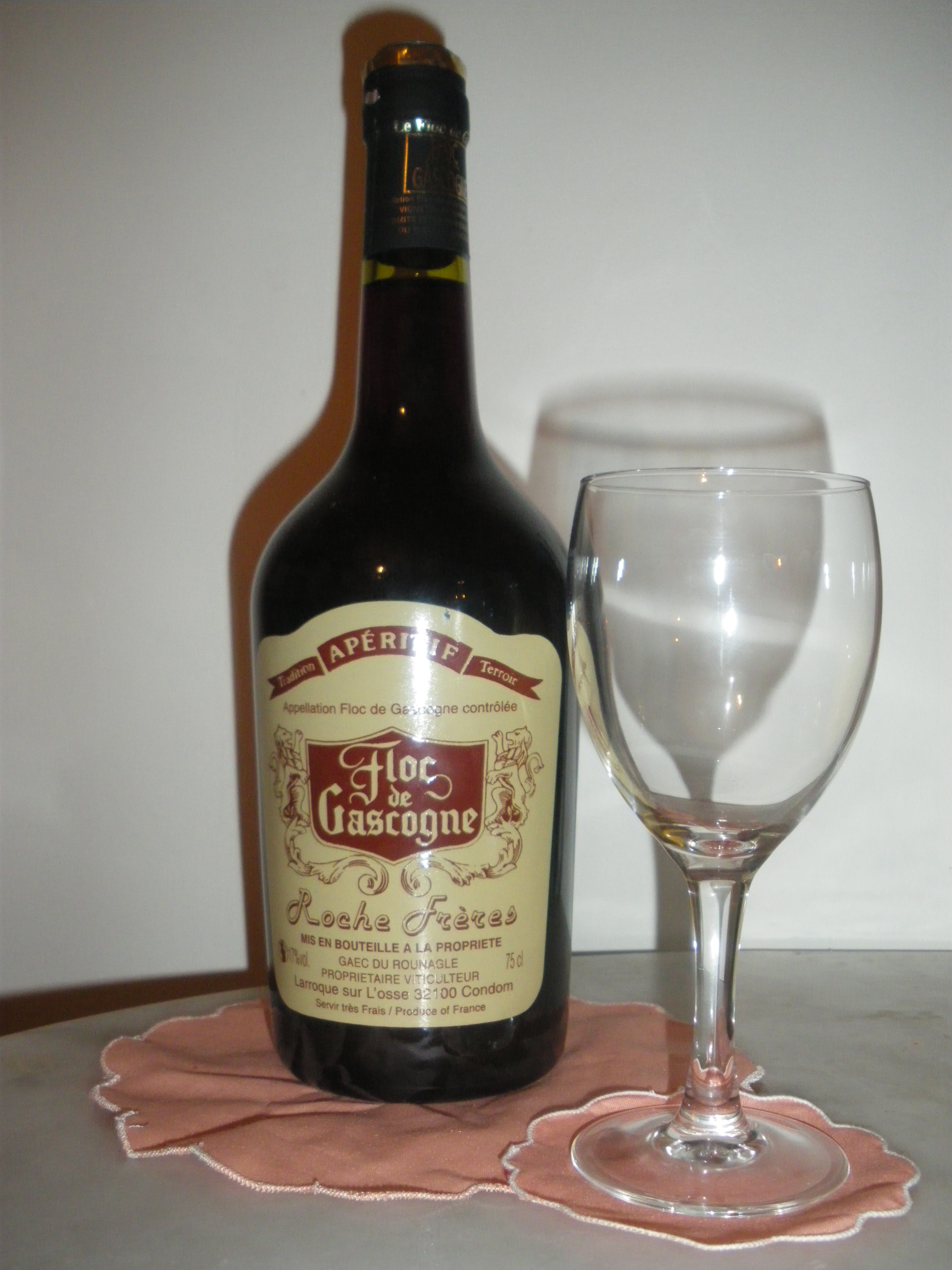
Floc de Gascogne

The Floc de Gascogne is a regional apéritif from the Côtes de Gascogne and Armagnac regions of Sud-Ouest wine region of France. It is a vin de liqueur fortified with armagnac, the local brandy. It has had Appellation d'origine contrôlée status since 1990. Elsewhere in France analogous drinks are made (Pineau des Charentes in the Cognac zone, Macvin in Jura; there is also Pommeau, similarly made by blending apple juice and apple brandy).

== History ==
Floc de Gascogne is produced according to a recipe that has been in use in the French region of Gascony since the 16th century. The name "Floc de Gascogne" was coined by Henri Lamor, a winemaker from Cravencères, in 1954. The word "floc" comes from the Occitan language and means bouquet of flowers.

== Characteristics ==
Floc de Gascogne is a mistelle, a vin de liqueur (a fortified sweet wine) made of 1/3 of armagnac and 2/3 of fresh grape juice both from the wine area Armagnac / Côtes de Gascogne. Both of these must be produced by the same vineyard.

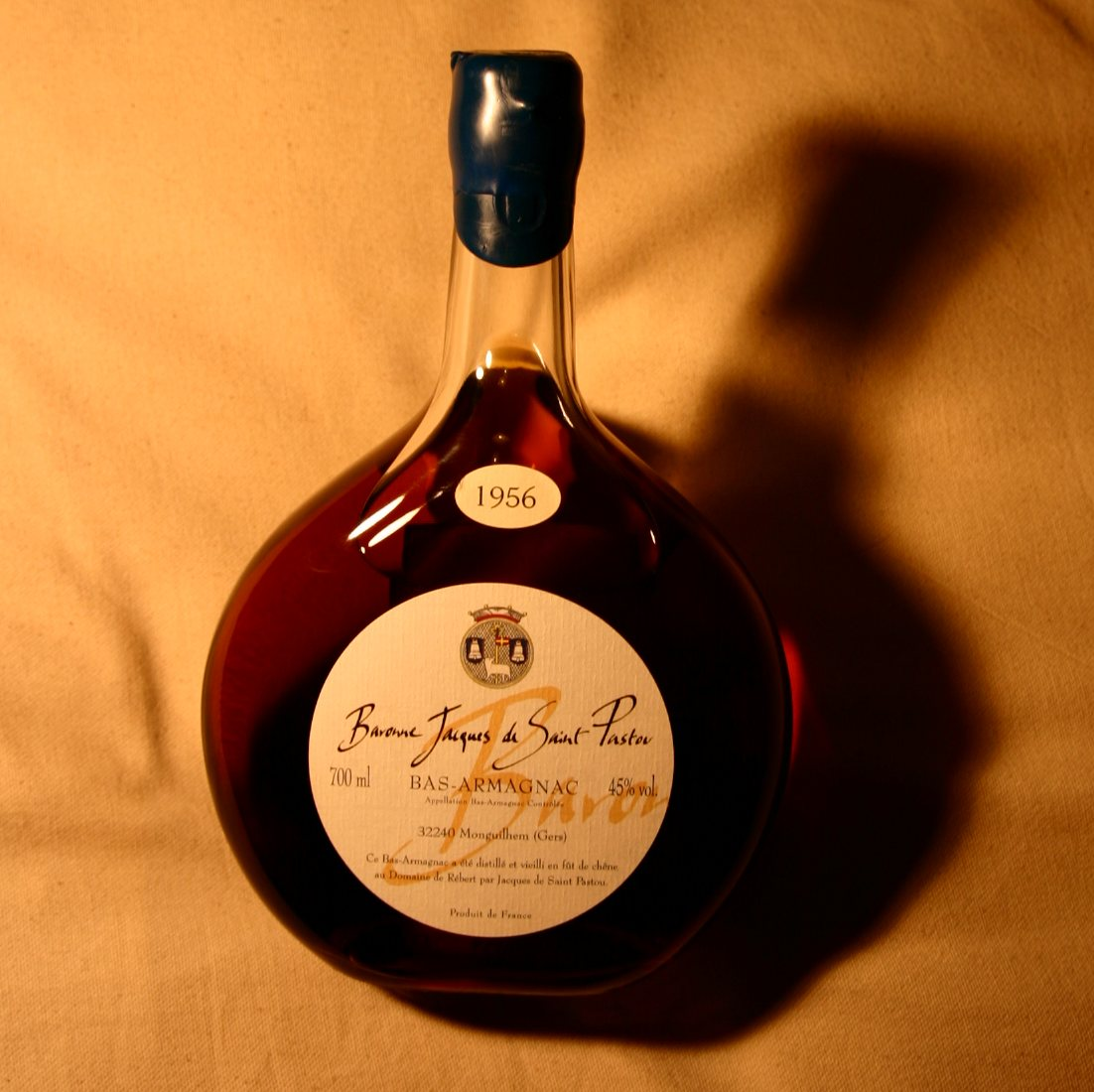
A bottle of armagnac

Floc de Gascogne is produced in both white and rosé varieties. The alcohol percentage is between 16 and 18% vol. After blending, the Floc is kept for 10 months in the cellar of the producer and must be approved by a committee of experts before it can be sold under the appellation Floc de Gascogne.

It is used as an aperitif most often, but also as a dessert drink. It should be consumed while cool, and is superb on ice. Almond, jasmine, roses, honey, black fruit and condiments are characteristic notes. Floc should be drunk within a year after the production. Once a bottle is opened, it may be stored for up to three months in the refrigerator.

== Armagnac/Côtes de Gascogne region ==
The region is divided in three distinct production areas:

- Bas-Armagnac
- Armagnac-Ténarèze
- Haut-Armagnac

The production area is spread across three regions: Gers, Lot-et-Garonne and the Landes. Only grapes harvested in this region may be distilled to Armagnac. The Armagnac area and the Côtes de Gascogne have the same borders. The whole AOC covers vineyards totaling 15.000 hectares.

== Grape varieties ==
- Floc de Gascogne blanc: Colombard, Ugni blanc and Gros Manseng
- Floc de Gascogne rosé: Cabernet Franc, Cabernet Sauvignon and Merlot
