= Francois blanc =

Francois blanc may refer to:

- François Blanc (1806–1877), French entrepreneur and operator of casinos
- Meslier-Saint-François, a white French wine grape variety
