= Bon blanc =

Bon blanc may refer to:

- Colombard, a white wine grape related to Chenin blanc and Gouais blanc
- Gouais blanc, a white grape variety that is seldom grown today
- Savagnin, a white wine grape mostly grown in the Jura region of France
