= Balzac blanc =

Variety of grape

Balzac blanc is a white French wine grape variety that is grown in the Charente and Charente-Maritime regions of Southwest France where it was once used for Cognac production but now is nearly extinct. The grape was one thought to be a color mutation of Mourvèdre (known as Monastrell and Balzac noir) but DNA analysis in 2000 showed that the two grapes were distinct and that Balzac blanc was a crossing of Gouais blanc and Chenin blanc.

== History ==
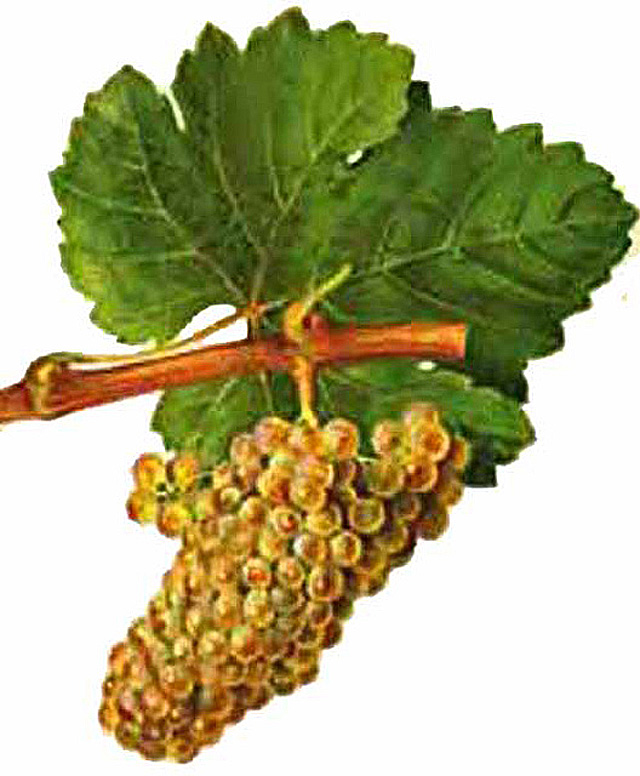
Chenin blanc, one of the parent varieties of Balzac blanc.

Ampelographers believe that the grape originated in the Cognac-producing wine region of the Charente and may be named after the commune of Balzac, Charente. The first written mention of Balzac blanc was by in 1842 when it was listed as one of the grape varieties growing around La Rochelle in the nearby Charente-Maritime department. It was believed that the grape was a color mutation of Mourvèdre but DNA profiling at the turn of the 21st century showed that Balzac blanc was actually a natural crossing of the Loire wine grape Chenin blanc and the Hunnic grape Gouais blanc. This pedigree makes the grape a full sibling to the Loire and Armagnac grape Meslier-Saint-François and Colombard which is also used for Armagnac and Cognac production.

== Viticulture ==
Balzac blanc is a mid-ripening variety that is very susceptible to many viticultural hazards including downy and powdery mildew.

== Synonyms ==
Over the years Balzac blanc has been known under a variety of synonyms including: Balzard blanc, Balzat, Blanc Limousin, Chigne, Dressiere, Limousin blanc, Margnac blanc, Plant de Saint Jean and Ressière.
