= Meslier-Saint-François =

Variety of grape

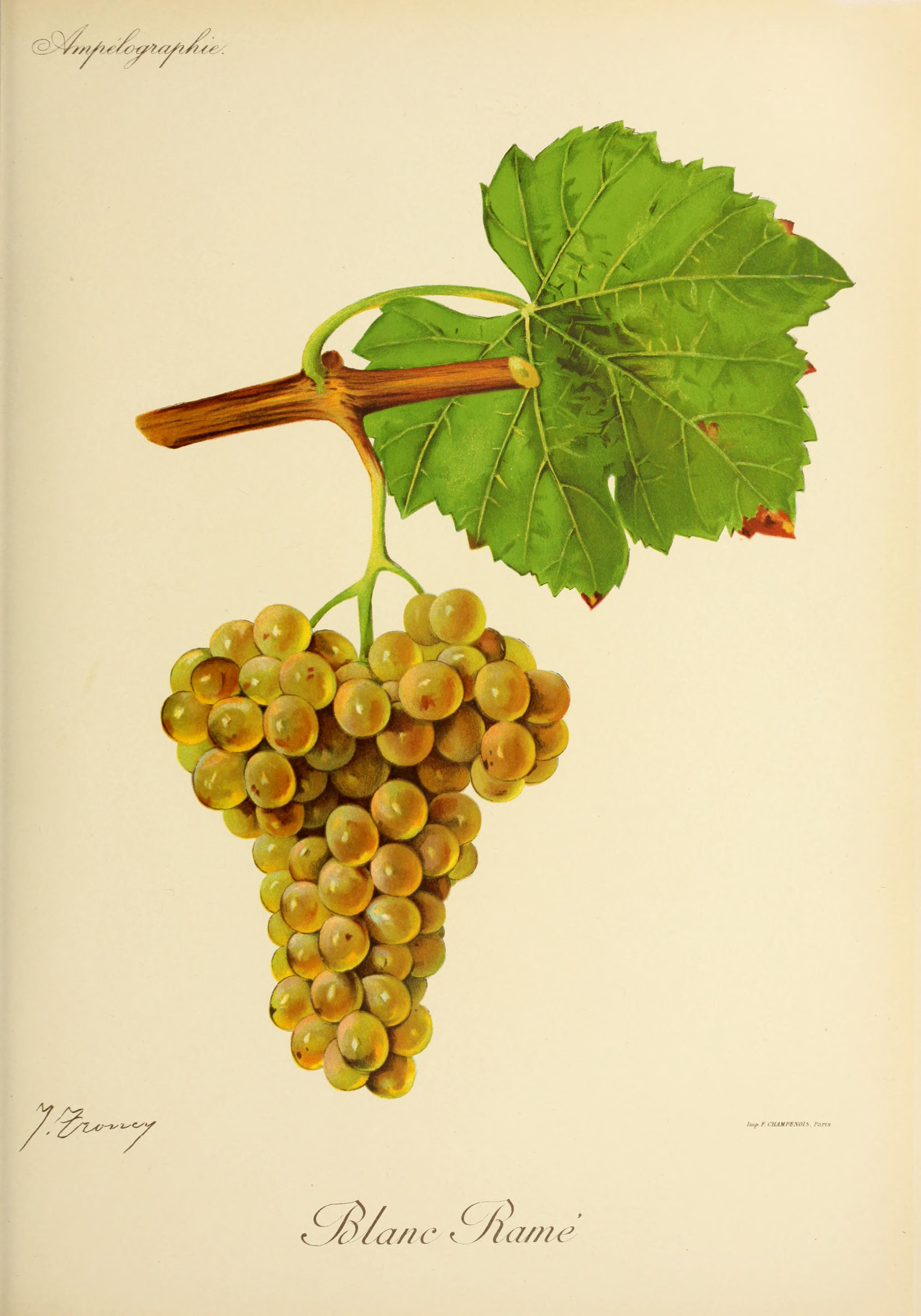

Meslier-Saint-François is a white French wine grape variety that is now grown predominantly in the Loir-et-Cher department of the Loire Valley. Historically, the grape was found more widely throughout the Loire and western France and was even used in the production of Armagnac. However, for most of the 20th century Meslier-Saint-François has been following a similar route to the Loire grape Arbois with plantings rapidly declining.

The grape is a crossing of Gouais blanc and Chenin blanc making it a sibling of Balzac blanc and Colombard.

== Synonyms ==
Various synonyms have been used to describe Meslier-Saint-François and its wines, including Anereau, Annereau, Blanc ramé, Blanc ramet, Bonne blanche, Bordeaux blanc, Chalosse, Chalosse de Bordeaux, François blanc, Gros meslier, Grosse blanche, Meslier, Meslier blanc, Meslier d’Orleans, Meslier de Seine et Oise, Meslier du Gâtinais, Meslier du Gers, Meslier gros, Meslier jaune, Meslier vert, Pelgarie, Pot de vin, Purgarie and Rochelin.
