= Alionza =

Variety of grape

Alionza is a white Italian wine grape variety that is grown in the Emilia-Romagna region of north central Italy, where it has a long history of being used since the 14th century as both a table grape and blending grape for wine production. While sometimes confused with the Greek wine grape Sklava, DNA analysis in the early 21st century has suggested, instead, that Alionza may be closely related to the Tuscan wine grape Trebbiano.

== History ==
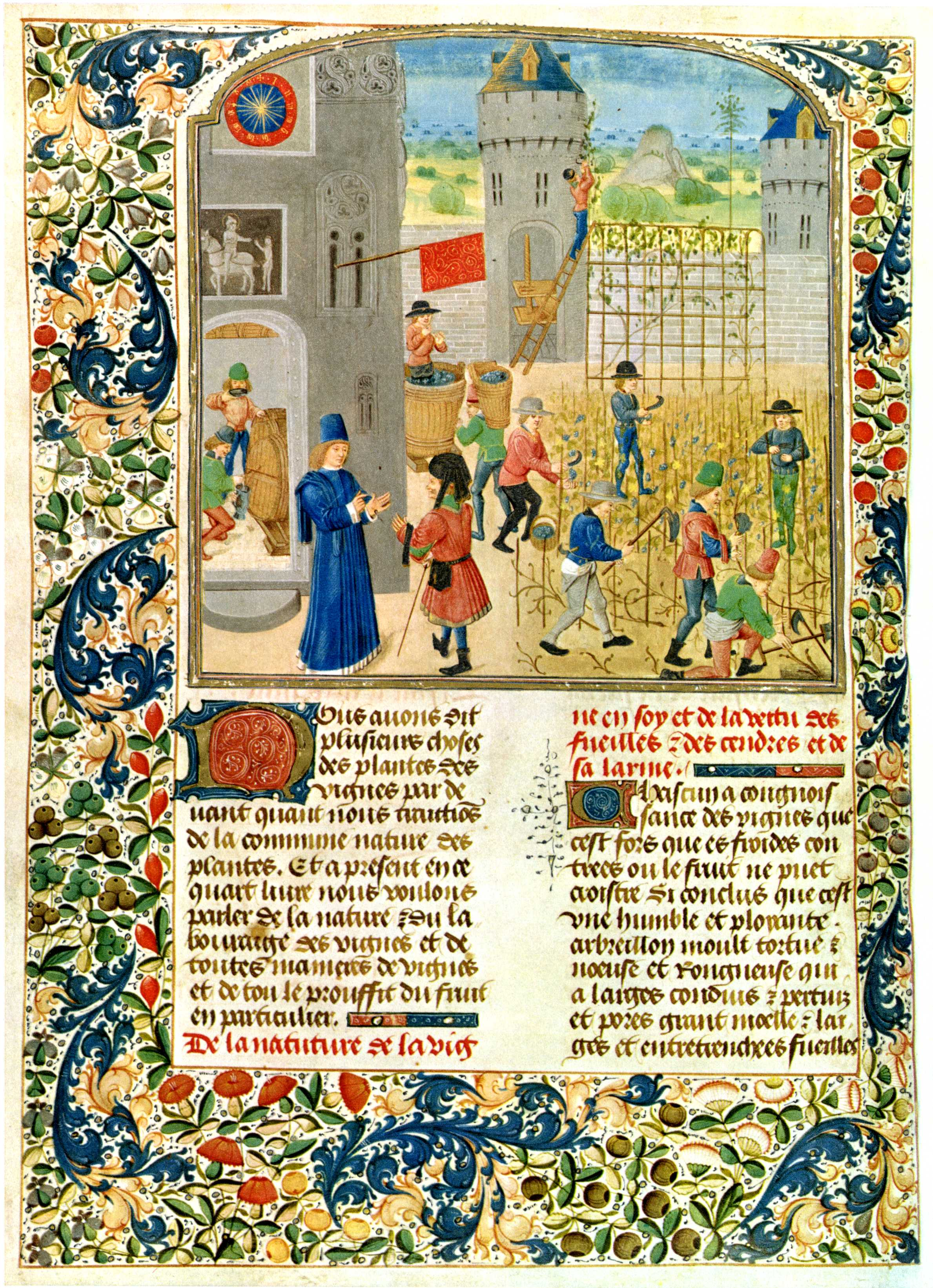
Alionza was one of the grapes growing in the vineyards of Emilia-Romagna described by the 14th-century Italian agricultural writer Pietro de' Crescenzi in his work, Ruralia commoda.

Alionza has been growing in the provinces of Bologna and Modena of Emilia-Romagna since at least the early 14th century, when it was documented in Italian agricultural writer Pietro de' Crescenzi's Ruralia commoda treatise. At once point the grape was also widely grown in the Lombardy wine regions of Brescia and Mantova but today is quite rare.

Historically, the grape has often been confused with the Greek wine grape Sklava that is grown in the eastern Peloponnese region of Argolis, but no evidence has ever suggested that the two grapes are closely related. Likewise, while French ampelographers in the late 19th century believed that Alionza was among the numerous white wine grape varieties growing in the southern French regions of Provence and the Languedoc, there has been no evidence to indicate that Alionza has ever left Italy. However, in the early 21st century, DNA analysis has suggested that there may be a close genetic relationship between Alionza and the white Tuscan wine grape Trebbiano, which is also known as Ugni blanc in France.

== Viticulture ==
Alionza is a late ripening grape variety that thrives best on warm vineyard soils, particularly in well exposed hillside locations. Like the Trentino-Alto Adige/Südtirol wine grape Schiava Grossa, Alionza has been historically trained in a pergola style system along horizontal wires which explains the common synonym of Alionza, Uva Schiava, which is derived from the Italian sciavo or "slave".

The grape has a reputation for being a reliable crop, producing consistent yields and having strong resistant to several viticultural hazards such as botrytis bunch rot, late spring frost and powdery mildew.

== Wine regions ==
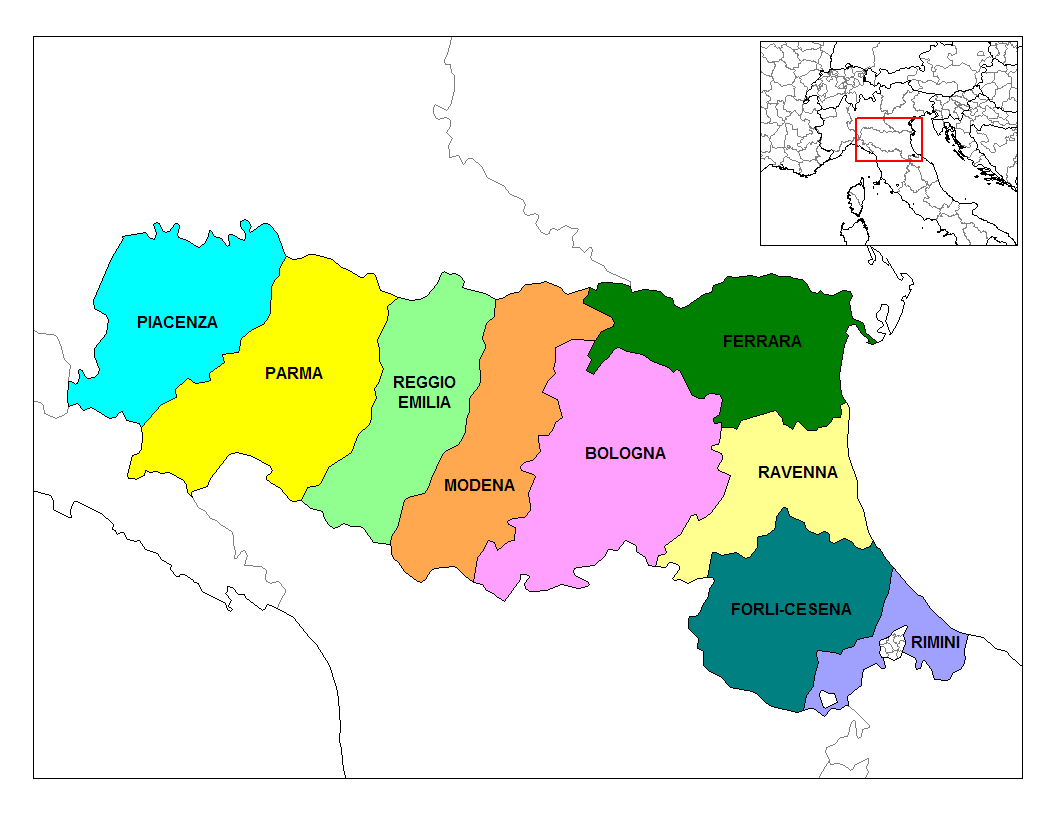
Today, Alionza is found almost exclusively in the Emilia-Romagna provinces of Bologna and Modena.

As of 2012, there were 43 hectares (110 acres) of Alionza in Italy, growing almost exclusively in the Emilia-Romagna provinces of Bologna and Modena. While, historically, Alionza was more widely planted, particularly in the Lombardy region, the grape has seen its numbers drastically drop over the last several centuries. Today it is mostly used as a minor blending grapes in some of the Indicazione Geografica Tipica (IGT) and Denominazione di Origine Controllata (DOC) wines of the region. In addition to wine production, some vineyards also sell their Alionza grapes for use as table grapes.

== Synonyms ==
Over the years, Alionza has been known under a variety of synonyms including: Aglionza, Alconza, Aleonza, Alionga, Bianca del Bolognese, Allionza, Allionza bianca, Glionza, Leonza, Uva Lonza and Uva Schiava.
