= Rinquinquin =

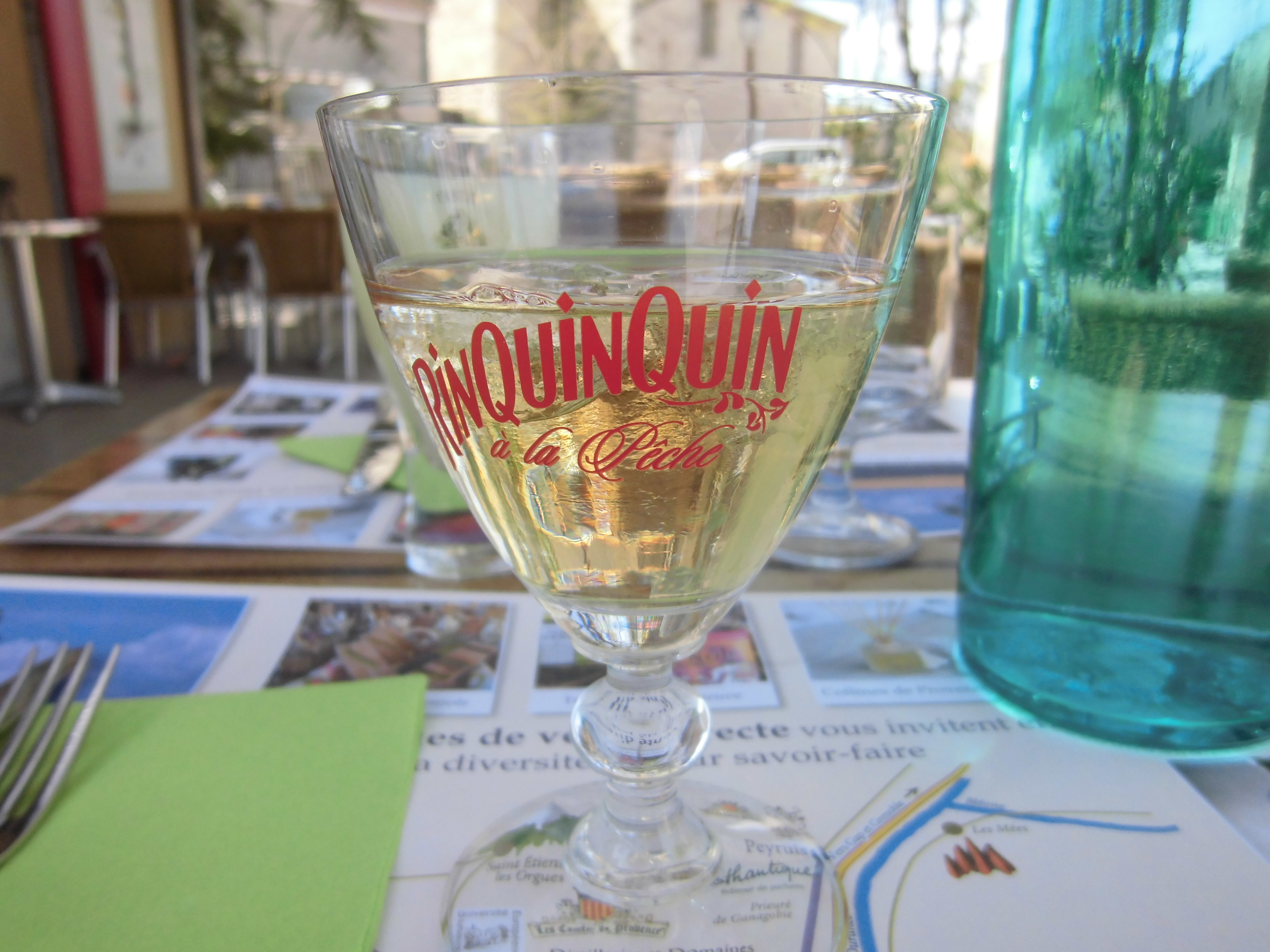

Rinquinquin is a peach apéritif produced in the south of France. It is made by infusing sweet peaches and delicate peach in a 100 proof neutral spirit. The results are mixed with white wine, essential oils of citrus and sugar.
