= Bas-Armagnac =

Viticultural plantation area in Armagnac, France

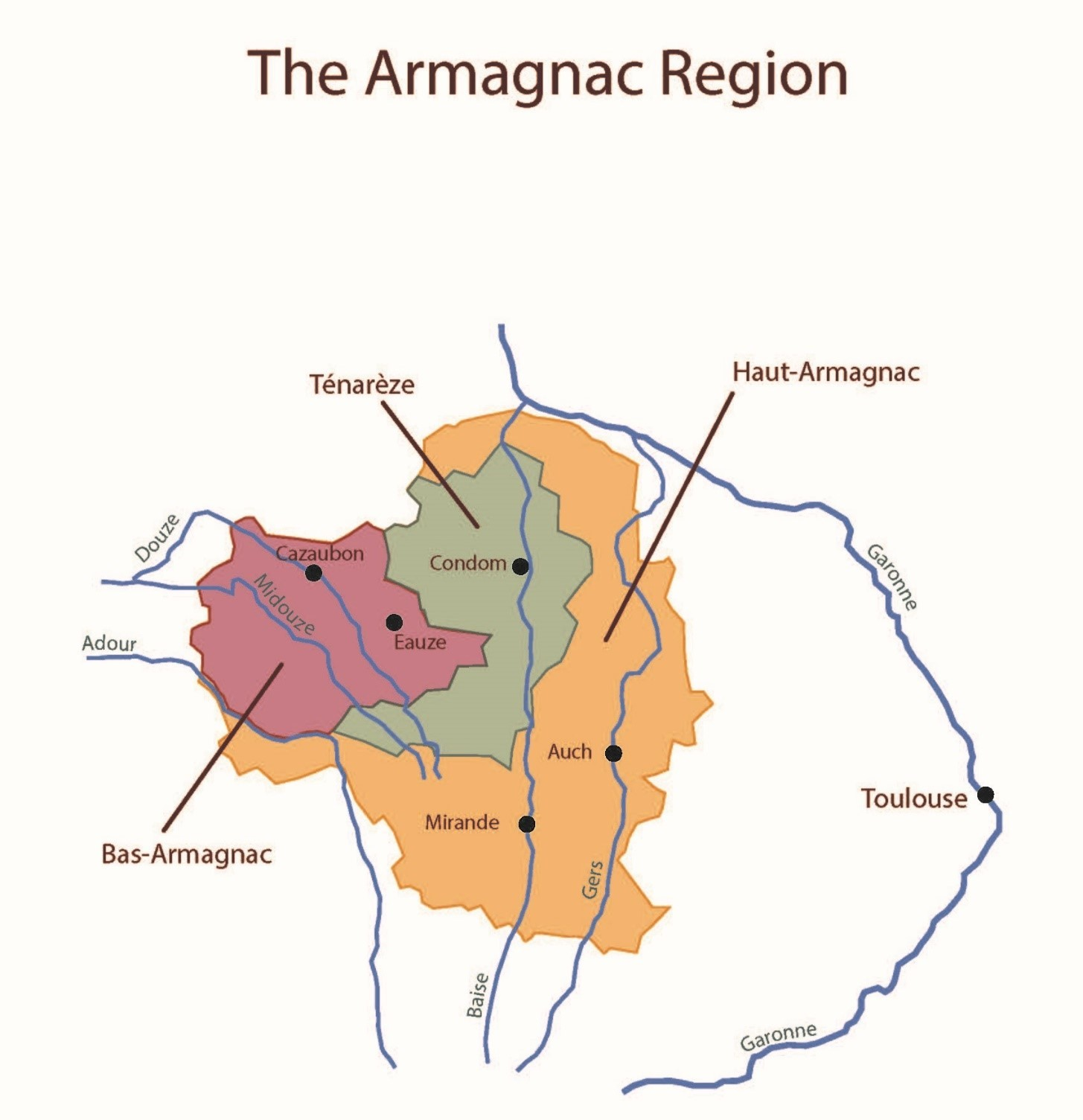
Map of the Armagnac region; Bas-Armagnac is red.

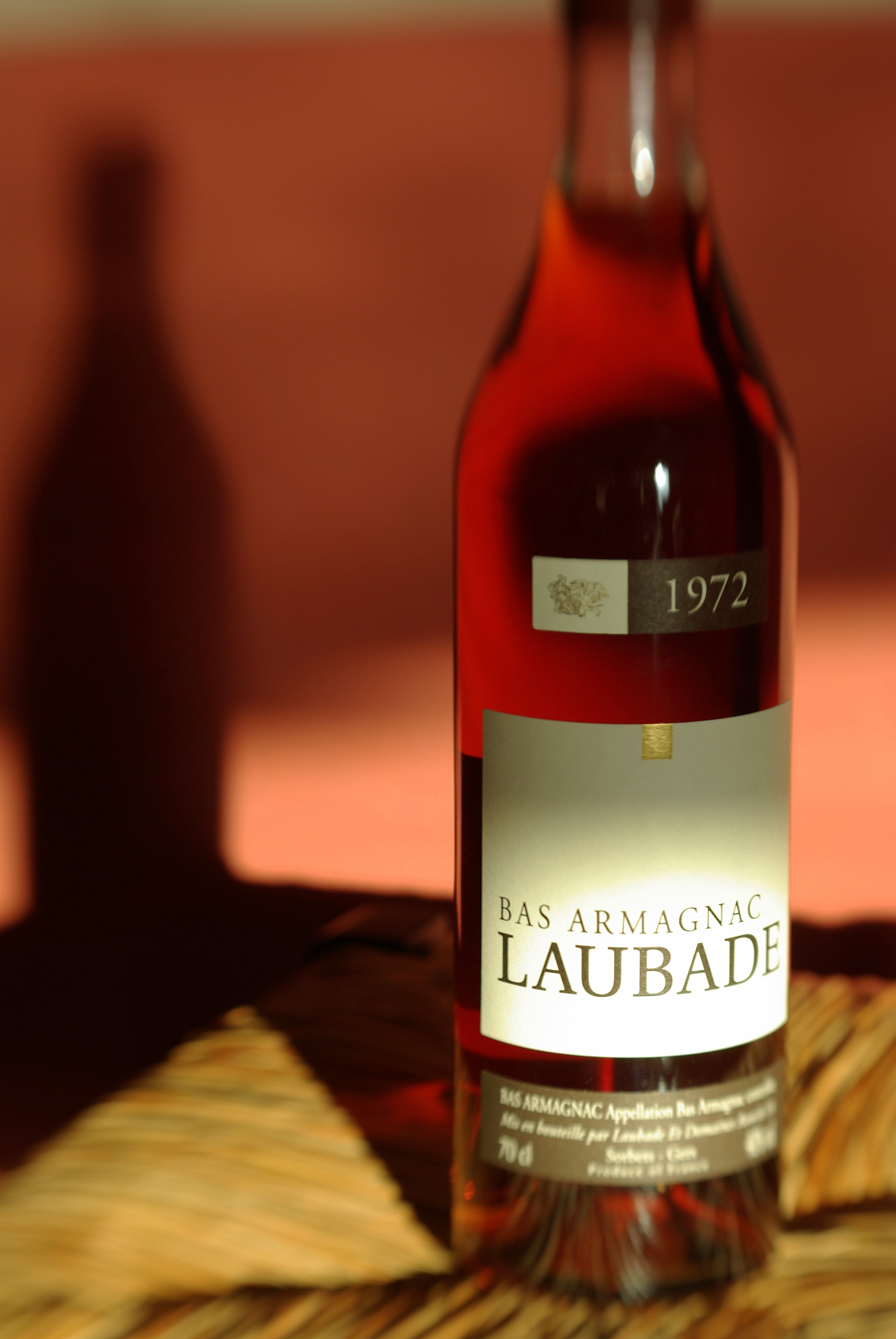
A 1972 bottle of Bas-Armagnac brandy.

Bas-Armagnac ("Lower Armagnac"; Occitan: Baish Armanhac) is one of the three plantation areas in the Armagnac area of France where grapes for the distillation of the Armagnac eau-de-vie can be cultivated.

57% of the Armagnac AOC's vineyards are within Bas-Armagnac. The Bas-Armagnac AOC was created in 1936, alongside its parent AOC (Armagnac) and its sibling AOCs (Armagnac-Ténarèze and Haut-Armagnac).

Bas-Armagnac extends over the Landes and Gers departments. It lies in the west, beside Armagnac-Ténarèze, an undulating area. The grapes grow in acidic, argillaceous and stony ground. Iron rust colors parts of the soil and these spots are called sables fauves. Major towns in the Armagnac region include Eauze, Cazaubon and Nogaro.

== See also ==
- Appellation d'Origine Contrôlée
- Côtes de Gascogne
- Floc de Gascogne
