= Haut-Armagnac =

Wine production region in southern France

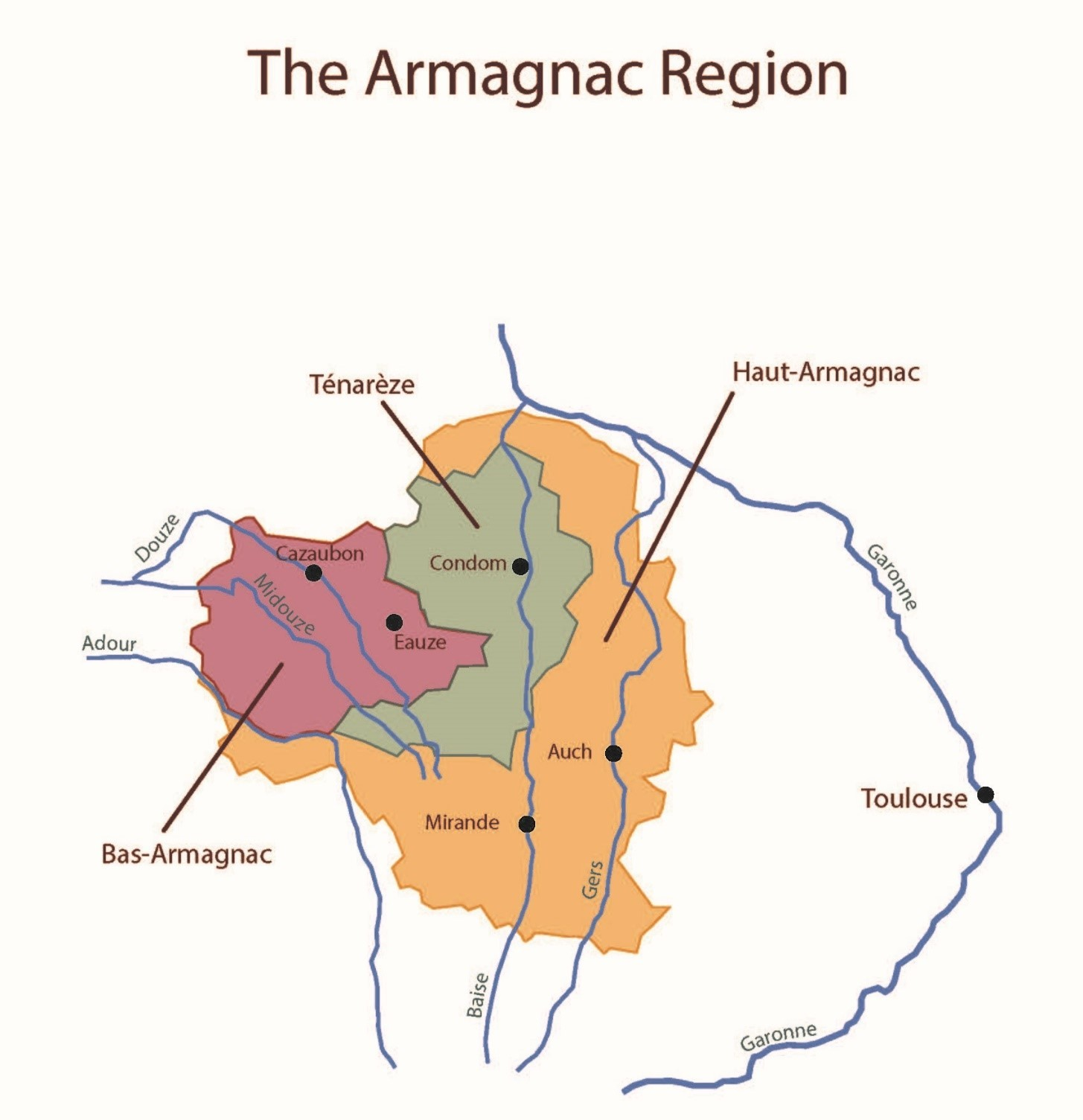
Map of the Armagnac region; Haut-Armagnac is orange.

Haut-Armagnac ("Upper Armagnac"; Occitan: Haut Armanhac), one of the three terroirs (plantation areas) in the Armagnac area where the grapes for the distillation of the Armagnac eau-de-vie can be cultivated. It lies to the south and east of Bas-Armagnac and Armagnac-Ténarèze, the two other areas, and is much the largest of the three.

3% of the Armagnac AOC's vineyards are within Haut-Armagnac, the fewest of the three subregions. The soil is chalky. The Haut-Armagnac AOC was created in 1936, alongside its parent AOC (Armagnac) and its sibling AOCs (Armagnac-Ténarèze and Bas-Armagnac).

Together the three areas form a single region where Armagnac, Côtes de Gascogne and Floc de Gascogne, which share the same AOC-limits, can be produced.

The area is called "white Armagnac" because of the abundance of limestone. It includes the eastern part of the department of Gers and a small part of Lot-et-Garonne. Viticulture was developed here in the 19th century to meet the high market demand. Today the original vineyards still exist but only represent a small amount of the production.

Haut-Armagnac includes the towns of Marciac and Lectoure and the capital of Gers, the city of Auch.
