= Armagnac-Ténarèze =

Plantation area in Armagnac region, France

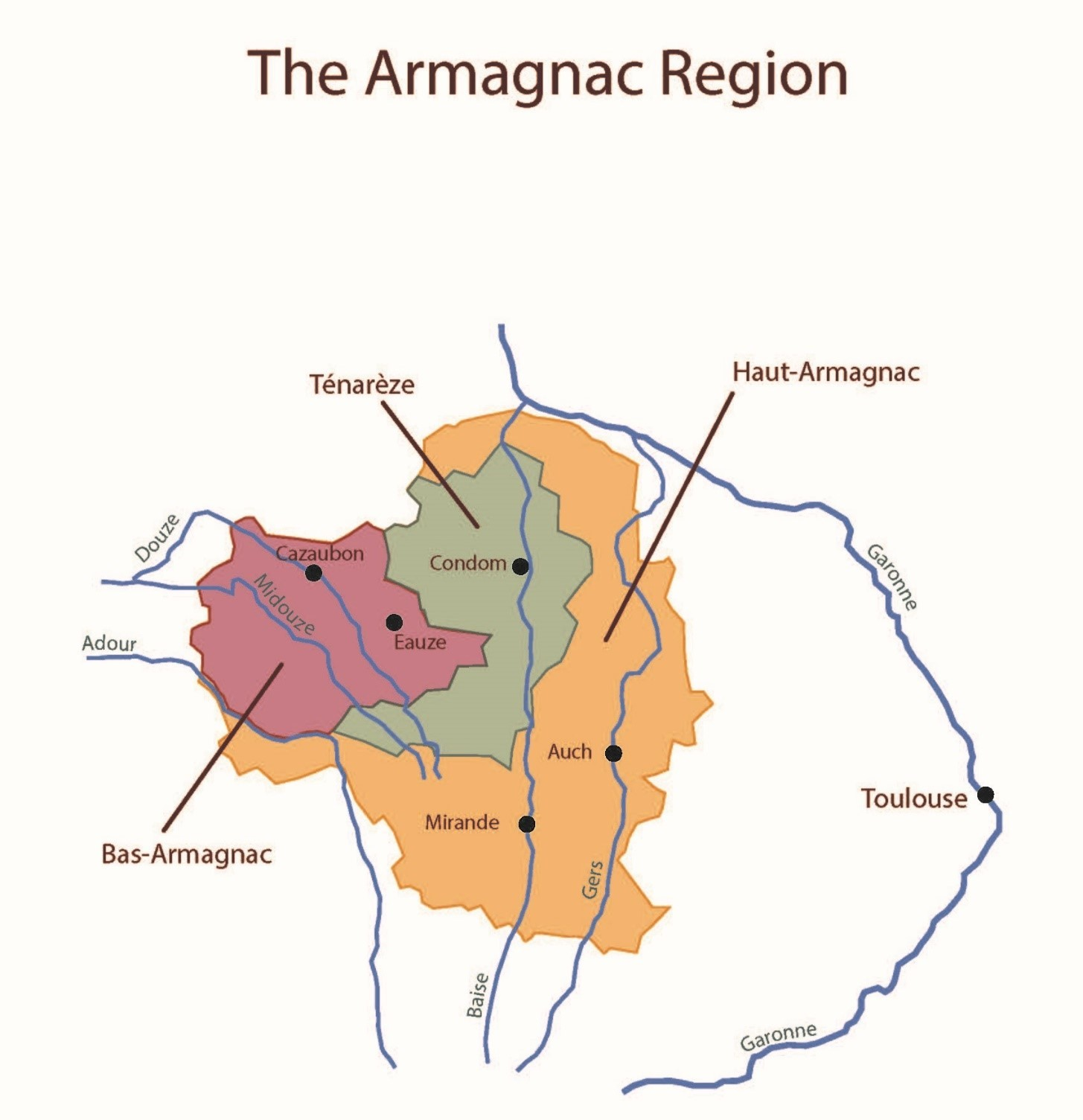
Map of the Armagnac region; Armagnac-Ténarèze is grey.

Armagnac-Ténarèze is one of the three terroirs (plantation areas) in the Armagnac region of France where grapes for the distillation of the Armagnac eau-de-vie can be cultivated. This area lies between Bas-Armagnac and Haut-Armagnac, covering the northwestern part of the department of Gers and the southern part of Lot-et-Garonne. Together the three areas form a single region where Armagnac (as well as Côtes de Gascogne and Floc de Gascogne, which share the same AOC-limits) can be produced.

== Region and distillate ==
Armagnac-Ténarèze represents about 40% of all Armagnac grape vineyards. The soil consists mainly of limestone, sand and clay. It includes the little village of Castelnau-d’Auzan.

The Ténarèze distillate is considered to be the strongest-tasting Armagnac. It reaches its full flavor at a later age than those of Bas- and Haut-Armagnac.
