= Armagnac =

Style of brandy produced in France

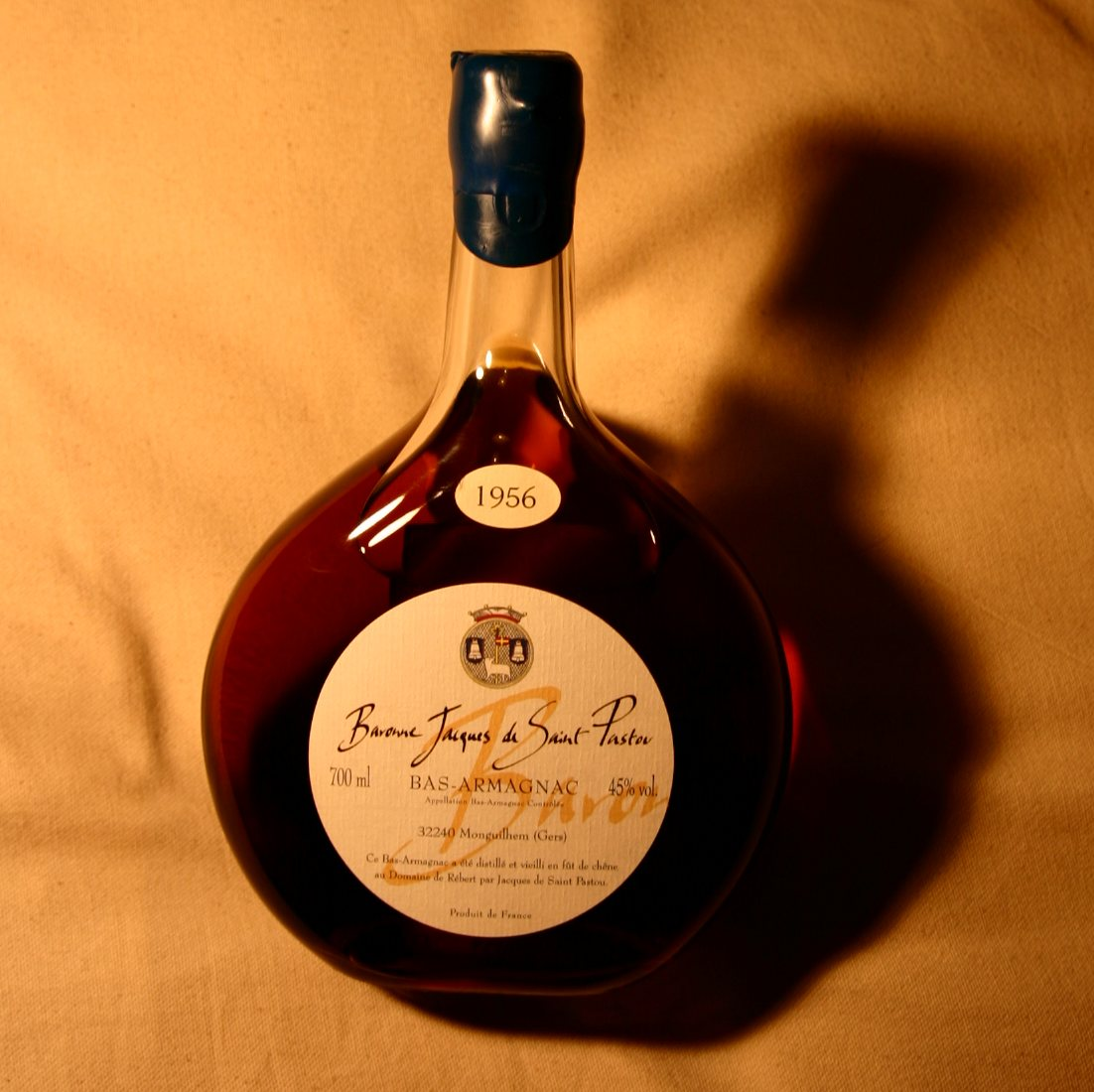
- A Baronne Jacques de Saint-Pastou, 1956
- Type: Brandy
- Origin: France, Gascony
- Alcohol by volume: 40%
- Related products: Cognac
- Website: armagnac.fr/en

Armagnac (US: /ˌɑːrmənˈjæk, ˌɑːrmɑːnˈjɑːk/, French: [aʁmaɲak]) is a brandy produced in the Armagnac region in Gascony, southwest France. It is distilled from wine usually made from a blend of grapes including Baco 22A, Colombard, Folle blanche and Ugni blanc, traditionally using column stills. This is in contrast to the pot stills used in the production of Cognac, which is made predominantly from Ugni blanc grapes. The resulting spirit is aged in oak barrels before release. Production is overseen by the Institut national de l'origine et de la qualité (INAO) and the Bureau National Interprofessionel de l'Armagnac (BNIA).

Armagnac was one of the first areas in France to begin distilling spirits. Because the overall volume of production is far smaller than Cognac production, the brandy is less known outside Europe. In addition, for the most part it is made and sold by small producers, whereas Cognac production is dominated by big-name brands.

== History and cultural uses ==
Armagnac is the oldest brandy and one of the oldest liquors still produced by distillation in the world. In the past it was consumed for its supposed therapeutic benefits, as were other liquors.

In 1310, Prior Vital du Four, a cardinal, wrote of its 40 virtues. Vital du Four was born in Bazas, in the centre of Armagnac. He was known as the prior of Eauze, which today houses the Bureau National Interprofessionnel de l'Armagnac (BNIA); however, historians have not found evidence that he ever visited Eauze, much less that he was writing specifically about distilled eau de vie from Armagnac.

Between the 15th and 17th centuries, Armagnac was traded on the markets of Saint-Sever, Mont-de-Marsan, and Aire-sur-l'Adour. Subsequently, Dutch merchants promoted the trade more widely by supplying or financing alembics.

The first record of Armagnac distillation does not appear until 1646, with the purchase of an alembic. In the following century, Armagnac was served in the palace of Versailles. By 1800, most of the Armagnac region was dedicated to the production of the brandy. In 1818, a patent for a continuous distillation alembic resulted in the main difference between current Armagnac and Cognac. The latter is double distilled in batches.

The French gourmet dish ortolan has traditionally been prepared by force-feeding an ortolan bunting before drowning it in Armagnac and roasting it. The dish is now legally prohibited due to laws protecting the bird.

== Geography ==
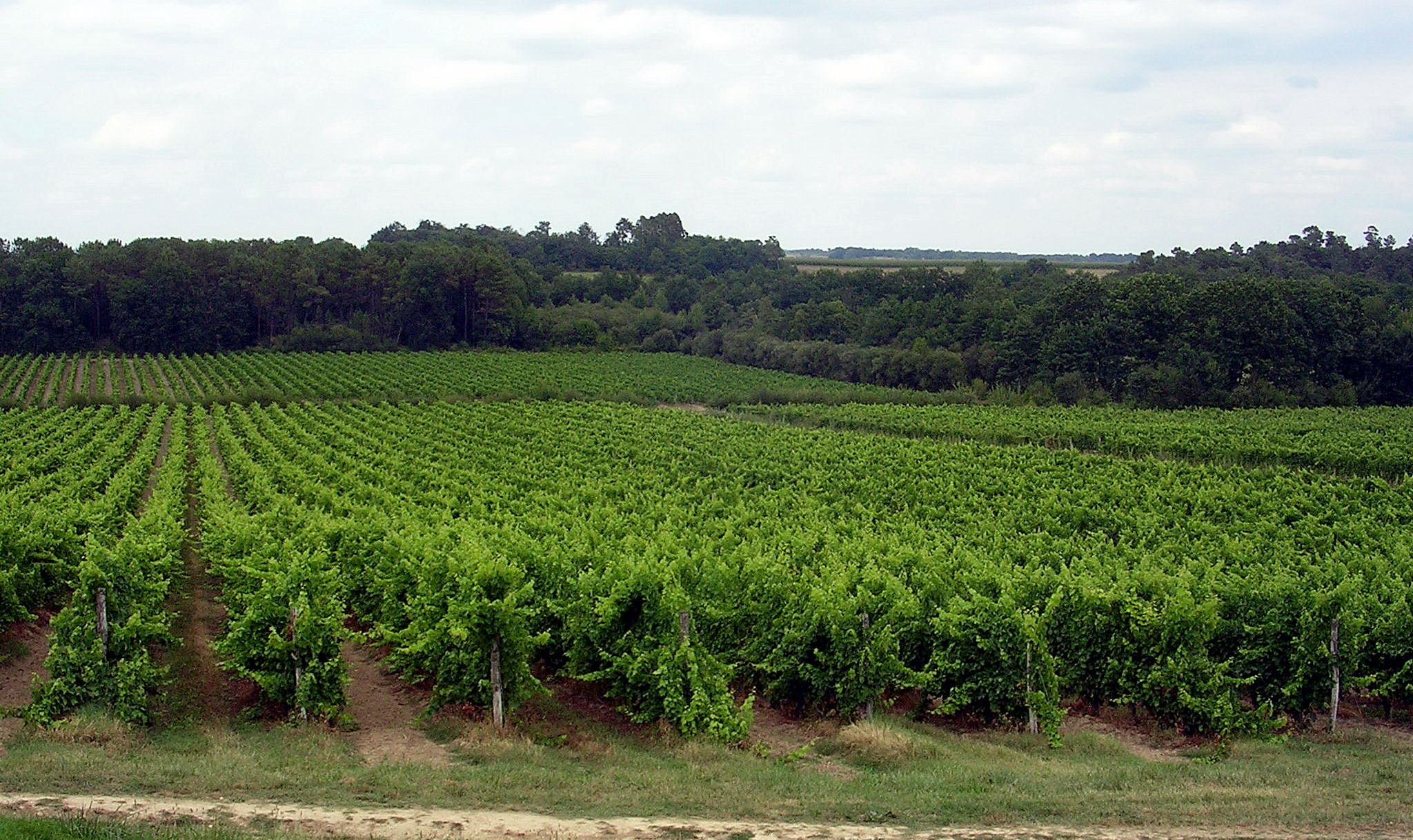
Vineyards in the Armagnac region near Landes and Gers

The Armagnac region lies between the Adour and Garonne rivers in the foothills of the Pyrenees. The region was granted Appellation d'Origine Contrôlée (AOC) status in 1936. The official production area is divided into three districts that lie in the departments of Gers, Landes, and Lot-et-Garonne. The region contains 150 square kilometres (37,000 acres) of grape-producing vines. The Fallières Decree of 25 May 1909 names the three districts as:

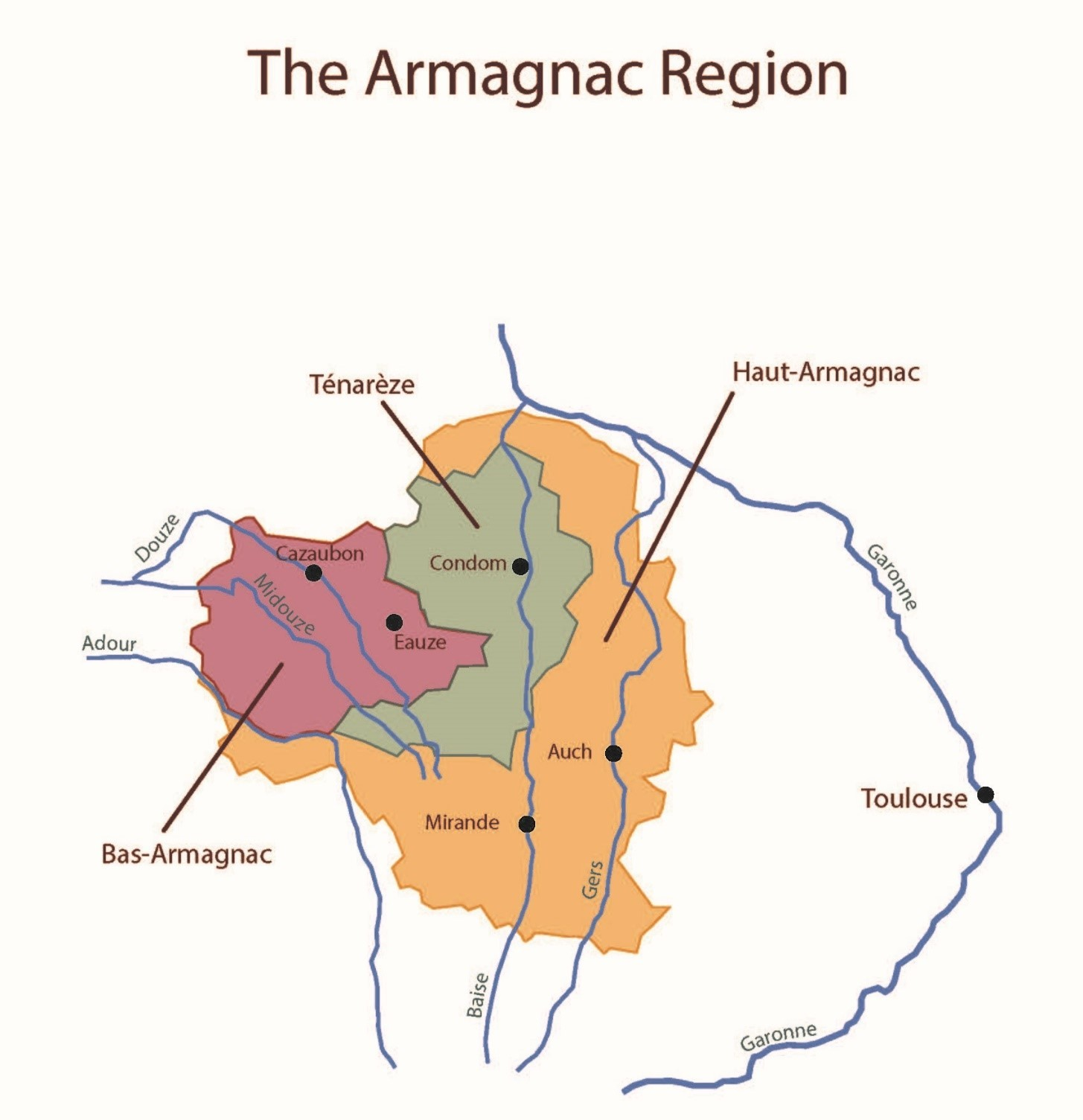
Map of the Armagnac region.

- Bas-Armagnac, responsible for about 62% of production
- Armagnac-Ténarèze, accounting for 37%
- Haut-Armagnac, a tiny area producing about 1% of all Armagnac

Each of these areas is controlled by separate AOC regulations. The newest appellation Blanche d'Armagnac ('white Armagnac') was established to allow the production and export of clear, unaged brandies.

== Production ==
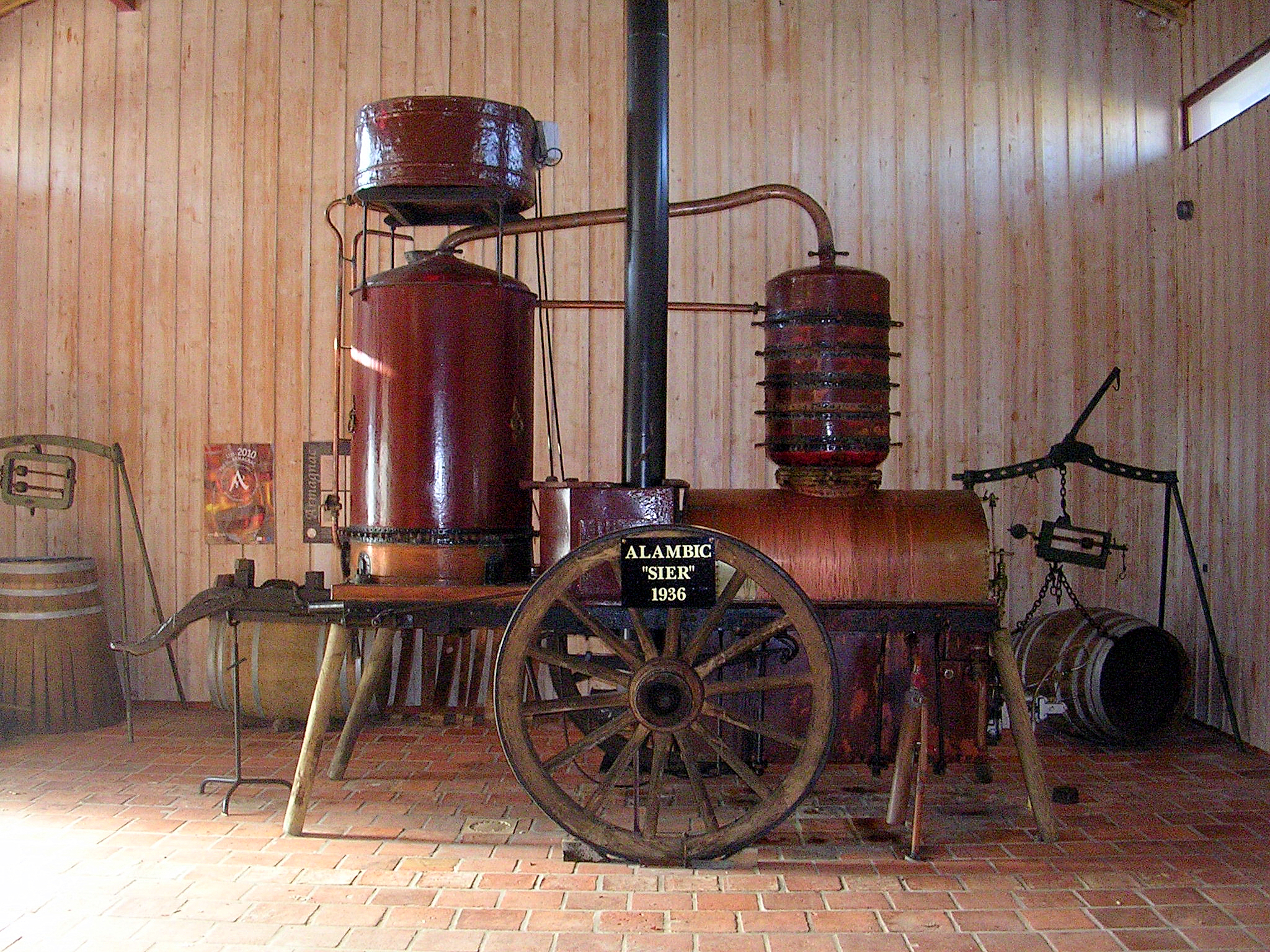
Column still, domaine d'Ognoas, Arthez-d'Armagnac, Landes, 1936

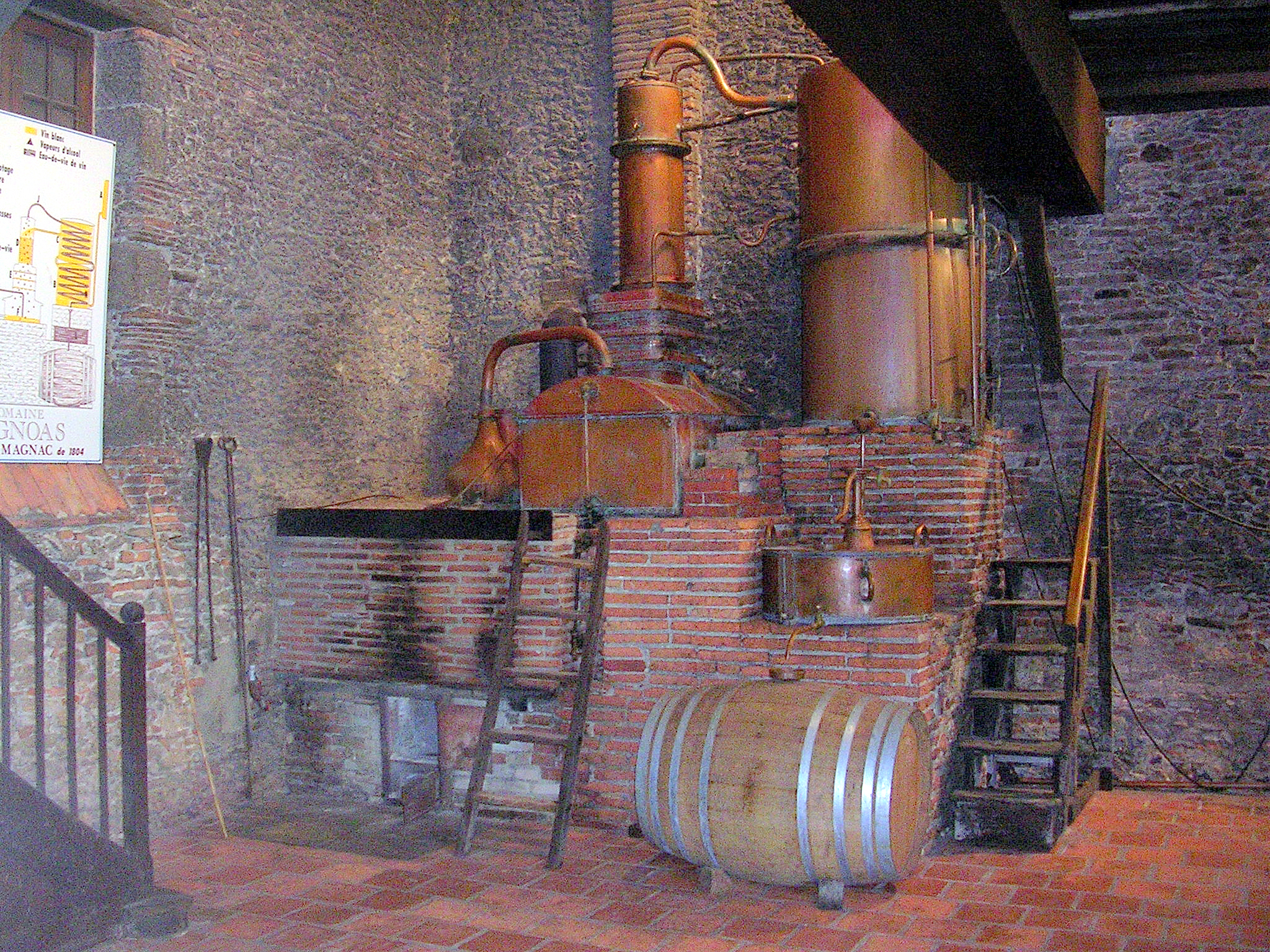
Column still, domaine d'Ognoas, Arthez-d'Armagnac, Landes, 1804

Armagnac is traditionally distilled once, resulting in alcohol content between 52% and 60%. The result is a more fragrant and flavorful spirit than Cognac, which is distilled twice. Long aging in oak barrels softens the taste and causes the development of more complex flavours and a brown colour. Ageing in the barrel removes a part of the alcohol and water by evaporation (known as part des anges—"angels' tribute" or "angels' share") and allows more complex aromatic compounds to appear by oxidation, which further modifies the flavour. Since alcohol evaporates faster than water, the alcohol degree is naturally reduced by an average of 0.4% per year depending on the characteristics of the cellars (average temperature and humidity). When the Armagnac is considered as matured, it is transferred to large glass bottles (called "Dame Jeanne") for storage. The main difference between Armagnac and other spirits is that, due to its relatively low alcoholic content, it is generally not diluted with water.

Armagnac is sold under several classifications, mostly referring to the age of the constituent brandies. Armagnac is allowed to be sold under vintages. When Armagnacs of different ages have been blended, the age on the bottle refers to the youngest component. A three-star, or VS, Armagnac is a mix of several Armagnacs that have seen at least one year of ageing in wood. For VSOP the ageing is at least four years, and for XO and Hors d'âge ten years. Older and better Armagnacs are often sold as vintages, with the bottles containing Armagnac from a single year, the year being noted on the bottle, aged for a minimum of 10 years. Vintages' flavour and appearance change depending on factors including the grape, ageing time, barrel used for ageing, grape variety, weather that year, storage location and more.

The Armagnac region produces 3 million bottles a year of brandy, compared to the 220 million produced in Cognac. However, the French drink only 4 million bottles of Cognac compared to 1.5 million of Armagnac.

=== Grapes ===
Ten different varieties of Armagnac grapes are authorised for use in the production of Armagnac. Of these, four are most common:

- Baco blanc
- Colombard
- Folle blanche
- Ugni blanc
