= Beaujolais (disambiguation) =

Beaujolais is a French Appellation d'Origine Contrôlée wine generally made of the Gamay grape which has a thin skin and is low in tannins.

Beaujolais may also refer to:

- Beaujolais (grape), a red French wine grape variety
- Beaujolais (province), France
- Beaujolais, the second song on the 1985 The Alan Parsons Project album Stereotomy
- Gamay Beaujolais, a clone of pinot noir
