= Vino Novello =

Type of wine produced throughout Italy

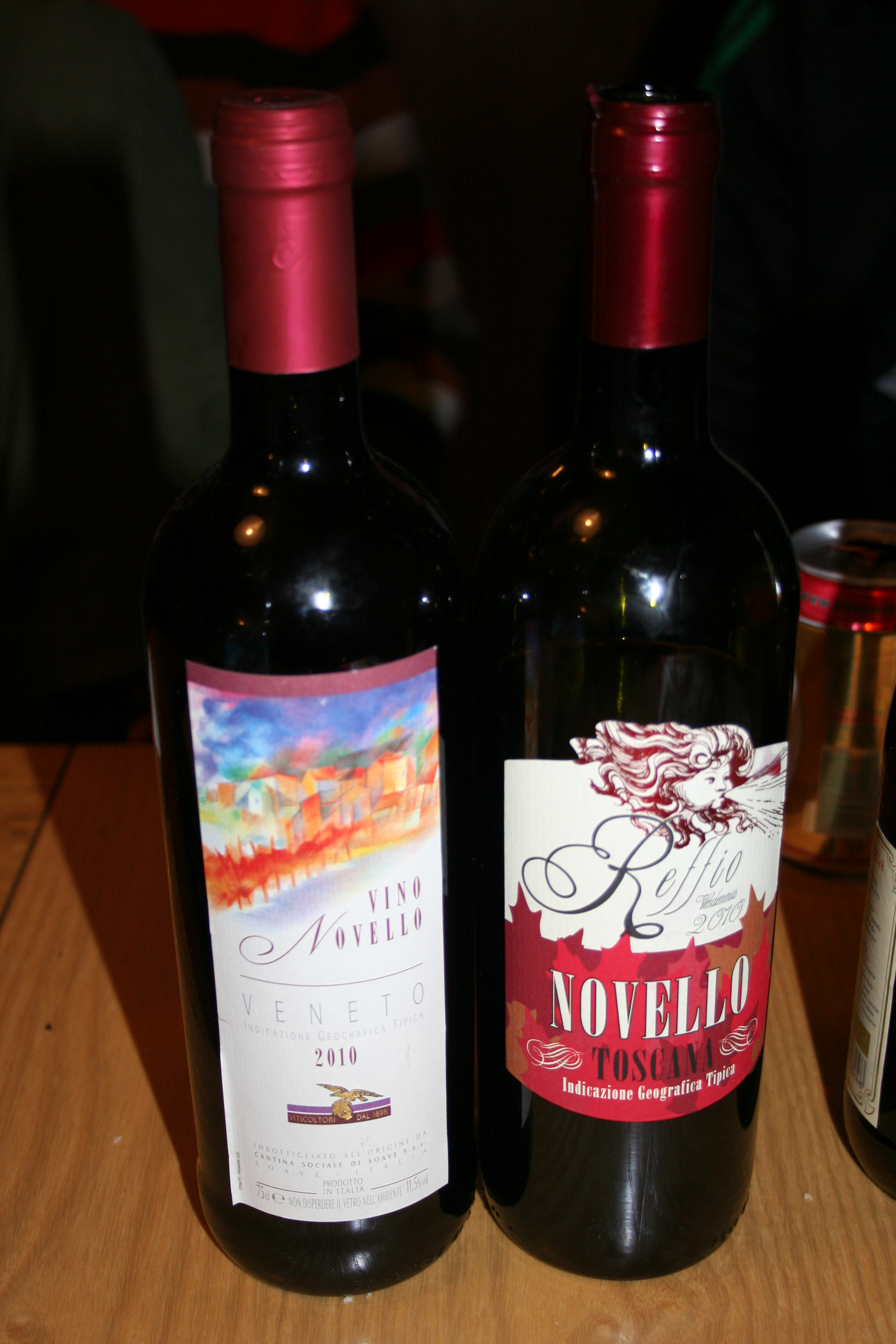
Two vino novellos, one from Veneto and one from Tuscany.

Vino novello, Italian for 'new wine', is a light, fruity, red wine produced throughout Italy. Novello is similar to its French cousin Beaujolais nouveau in taste, body and color, but is produced using several grape varieties with a more liberal fermentation process. While historically released for sale on November 6, Novello is since 2012 available on 30 October.

== Style ==
Vino novello is lightweight with low alcohol content (usually not more than 11%) and a light aroma.

Novello's literal Italian translation means 'young wine,' but it is also "the wine to be drunk young". What Vino novello does not have is tannins.

In some places in Italy, tradition says the last day to consume it is “I Giorni della Merla”, the days of the blackbird, said to be the coldest day of the year (29–31 January).

== Production ==
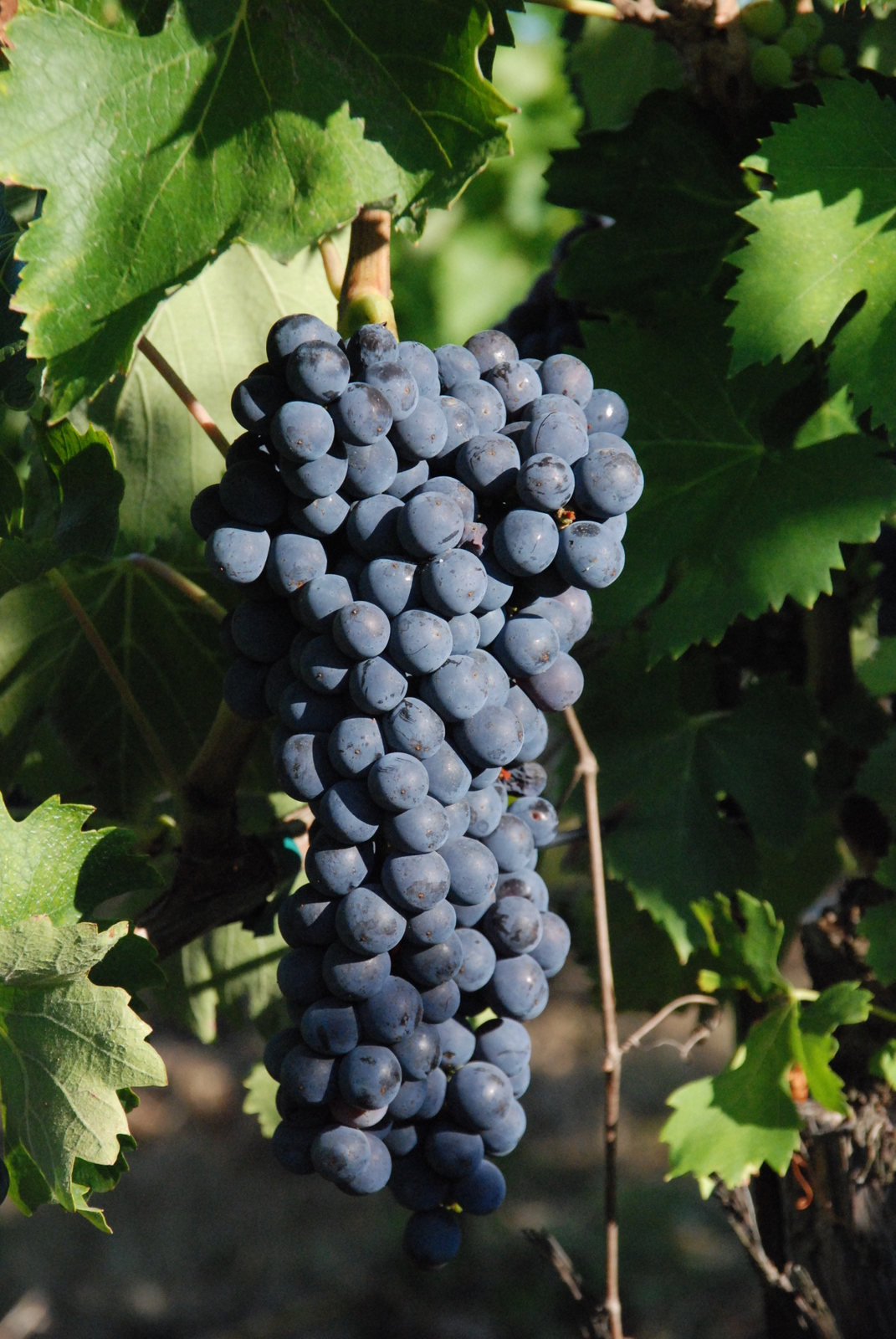
Ciliegiolo is one of the varieties used to produce Vino novello wines.

Vino novello is made from a different process to normal red wines. Novello is the result of a different procedure of processing the grapes, carbonic maceration, which involves accelerating the fermentation process. This method was developed in France in the 1930s.

The grapes are placed in large barrels or vats. They are then closed off and air is eliminated by pumping in CO_{2}. The natural yeast migrate from the skin of the grapes into the pulp, looking for water and oxygen, and the fermentation takes place. The fermentation process lasts about 20 days.

The whole bunches are placed within a designated 50 to 70 hl (1,300 to 1,800 US gal) tubs, in which after producing a vacuum of air is blown CO_{2} at 30 degrees Celsius for 7–14 days. The clusters that are located on the bottom of the tanks are crushed by the mass of grapes and release the juice. Yeasts indigenous to the pulp from the peel migrate in search of oxygen and water, triggering a process of intracellular fermentation. At the end of the cycle, the 'red wine' is slightly crushed and further fermented for 3-4 days. The minimum alcohol content is 11%, the deadline for bottling is 31 December of the same vintage year.

Italy will produce approximately 9 million bottles of Vino novello in 2009, some 4% down over 2008, with 236 vineyards making the wine compared to 246 in 2008. Over 400 vineyards were producing Vino novello in 2004 after its popularity peaked.

Almost half of Novello production comes from the northern Veneto region. It is followed by Trentino, Tuscany, Sardinia, Emilia Romagna, Puglia, and Friuli.

Common grape varieties used in production of Vino novello are: Barbera, Cabernet Sauvignon, Canaiolo, Ciliegiolo, Dolcetto, Grignolino, Merlot, Nebbiolo, Pinot noir, Refosco, Sangiovese and Teroldego.

Profits are expected to reach a value of more than 40 million euro (about $60 million) for 2009.

== History ==
The birth of 'young wine' comes from the Beaujolais wine region, a southern area of Burgundy. A novel wine making technique was developed by a Frenchman, M. Flanzy, in the 1930s. The main difference in making Vino novello wines is that the grapes are not crushed but are fermented using whole grapes, allowing for only a minimum percentage of sugar to be converted into alcohol, ensuring the wine has a smooth, fruity flavor. Italy first started making Vino novello in the 1970s. The first producers were Angelo Gaja (Vinot) and Marchesi Antinori (S. Giocondo). Vino novello was officially recognized in Italy in 1987.

== Beaujolais nouveau vs. Vino novello ==
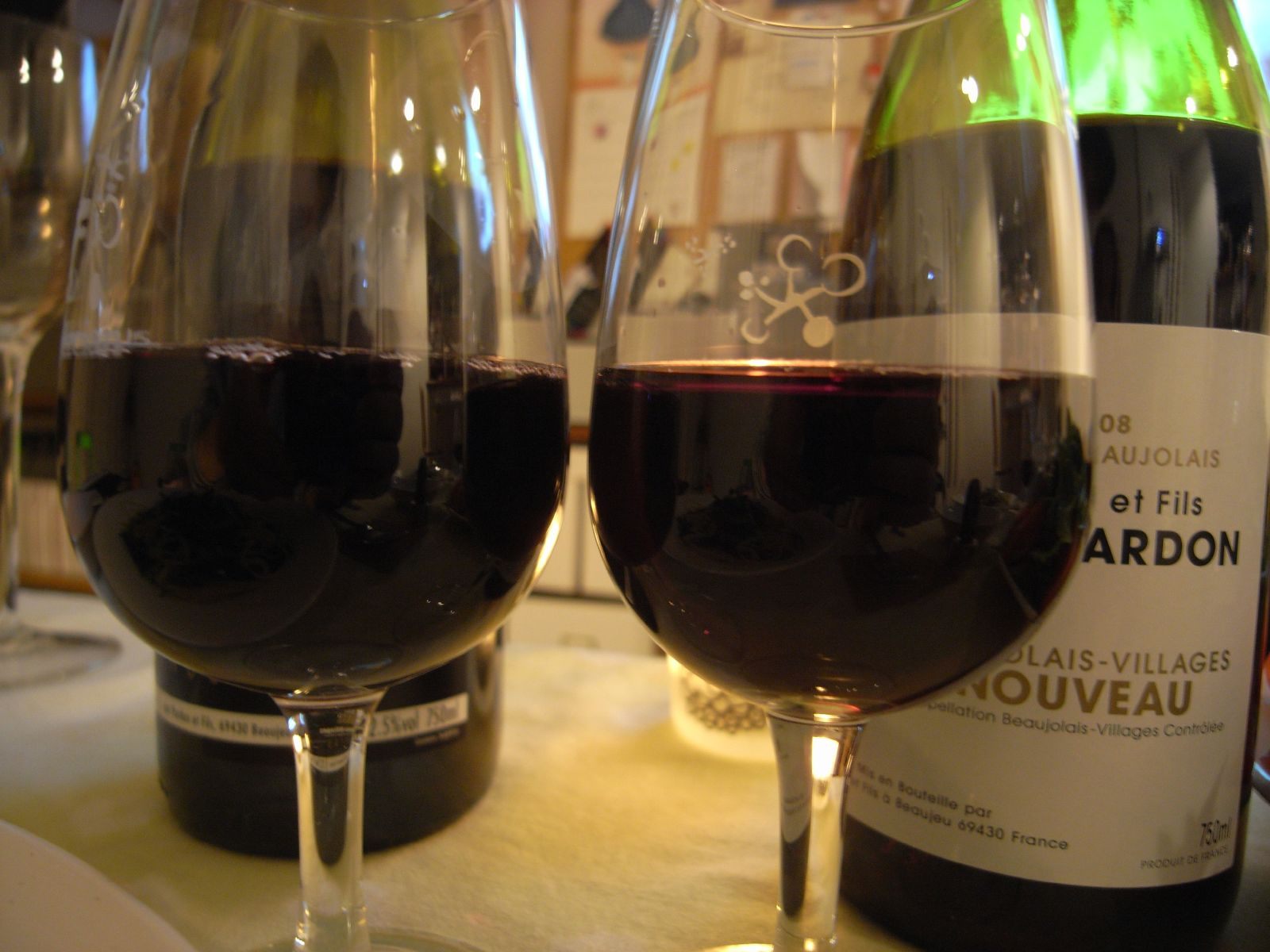
Beaujolais Nouveau made from Gamay

The two wines are very similar, but there are significant differences.

- Beaujolais nouveau is released on the third Thursday of November
- Vino novello is marketed on October 30
- Beaujolais nouveau is produced from a single grape variety: Gamay
- Italy uses over 60 varieties, of which seven are international. Merlot is the most used (17%), 42 are single-variety.
- The harvest in Beaujolais is strictly manual; grapes must be picked by hand only.
- Italy authorizes mechanical means to pick grapes.
- For Beaujolais nouveau, 100% carbonic maceration must be used
- A minimum of 30% carbonic maceration is common for Vino novello. Not all producers restrict the carbonic maceration to 30%, but it should be clearly explained in the label.
- France produces about 65 million bottles of Beaujolais (2004)
- Italy produces about 17 million bottles of Vino novello of various types (2004)

== See also ==
- Nouveau
- Beaujolais Nouveau
- Vinho Verde
- Federweisser
