= Carbonic maceration =

Winemaking technique

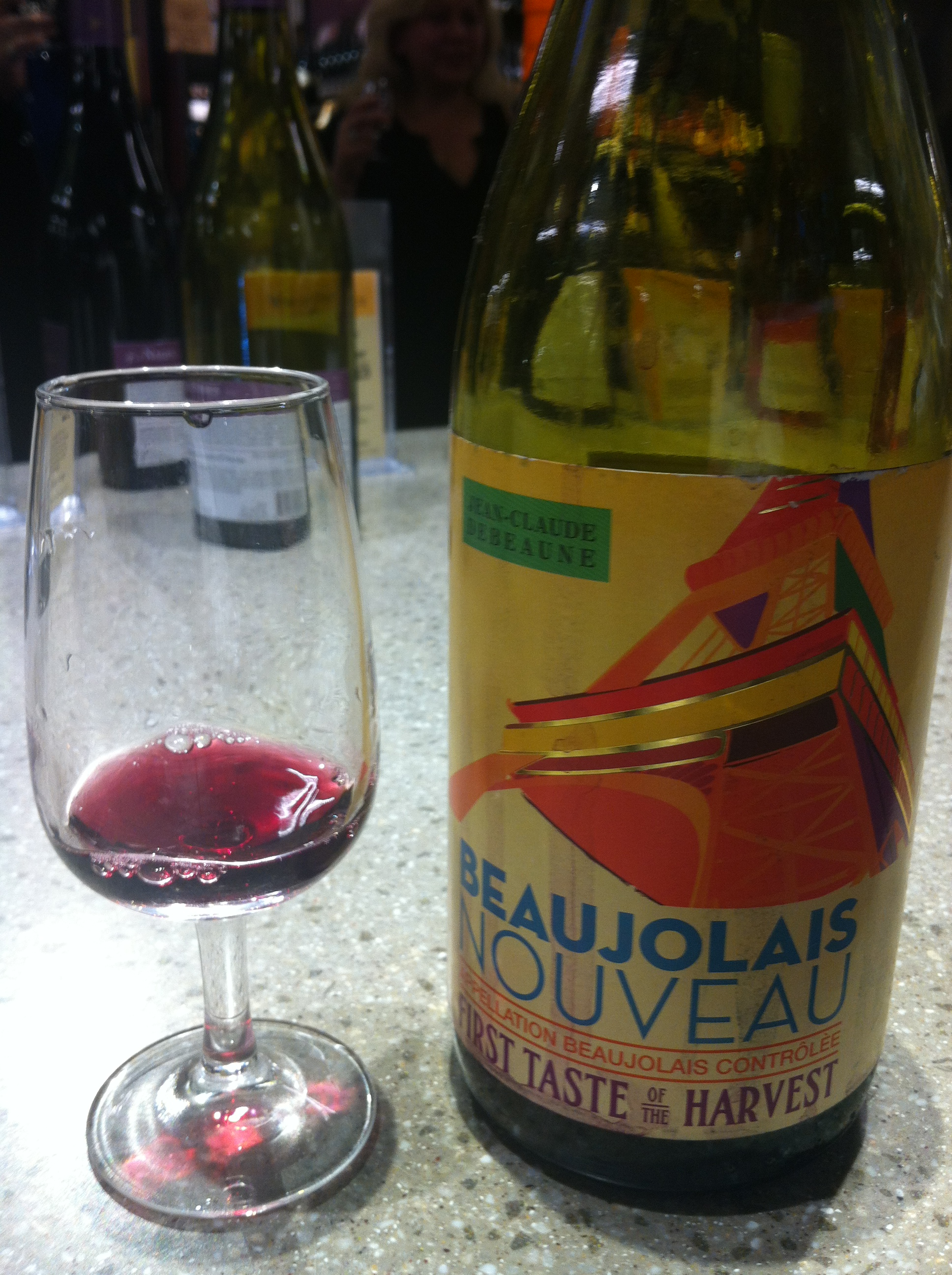
Beaujolais Nouveau made by carbonic maceration

Carbonic maceration is a winemaking technique, often associated with the French wine region of Beaujolais, in which whole grapes are fermented in a carbon dioxide rich environment before crushing. Conventional alcoholic fermentation involves crushing the grapes to free the juice and pulp from the skin with yeast serving to convert sugar into ethanol. Carbonic maceration ferments most of the juice while it is still inside the grape, although grapes at the bottom of the vessel are crushed by gravity and undergo conventional fermentation. The resulting wine is fruity with very low tannins. It is ready to drink quickly but lacks the structure for long-term aging. In extreme cases such as Beaujolais nouveau, the period between picking and bottling can be less than six weeks.

During carbonic maceration, an anaerobic environment is created by pumping carbon dioxide into a sealed container filled with whole grape clusters. The carbon dioxide gas permeates through the grape skins and begins to stimulate fermentation at an intracellular level. The entire process takes place inside each intact berry. Ethanol is produced as a by-product of this process but studies have shown that other unique chemical reactions take place that have a distinctive effect on the wine.

== History ==
The process of carbonic maceration occurs naturally in a partial state without deliberate intervention and has occurred in some form throughout history. If grapes are stored in a closed container, the force of gravity will crush those at the bottom, releasing grape juice. Ambient yeasts present on the grape skins will interact with the sugars in the grape juice to start conventional ethanol fermentation. Carbon dioxide is released as a by-product and, being denser than oxygen, will push out the oxygen through any permeable surface (such as slight gaps between wood planks), creating a mostly anaerobic environment for the uncrushed grape clusters to go through carbonic maceration. Some of the earliest documented studies of the process were conducted by the French scientist Louis Pasteur, who noted in 1872 that grapes contained in an oxygen-rich environment before crushing and fermentation produced wines of different flavors than grapes produced in a carbon dioxide-rich environment. This was because the fermentation process had already started within the individual grape clusters before yeasts were introduced during conventional fermentation.

== Wine production ==
The use of carbonic maceration is closely associated with the production of Beaujolais nouveau wine from the Gamay grape in the Beaujolais region and some wines in the Rioja Alavesa and Jumilla areas of Spain. This grape lends itself well to the production of simple, fruity wines and Beaujolais winemakers have been able to create a unique identity based on this distinctive style.

Producers in other parts of France and in the New World have frequently utilized carbonic maceration for their own Gamay production, or with other grape varieties. Winemakers in the Languedoc and Rhône wine regions will sometimes employ the technique on coarse and tannic grapes like Carignan, especially if they are to be blended with other varieties. In California, the process is sometimes used with Valdiguié grapes, producing what is labeled a "Nouveau" wine.

The process is almost always used in conjunction with red wine production since some of the flavor compounds produced by volatile phenols tend to form undesirable flavors with white wine grape varieties.

=== Other techniques ===
Semi-carbonic maceration is the winemaking technique where grapes are put through a short period of carbonic maceration, followed by conventional yeast fermentations. This is the process used in producing Beaujolais nouveau wines. To an extent, most wines were historically treated to some form of semi or partial carbonic fermentation (as noted in the history section above) with the amount depending on the shape and size of the vessel the grapes were stored in before crushing. The deeper the vessel, the greater the proportion of grapes that could be exposed to an anaerobic environment caused by the release of carbon dioxide from the crushed grapes on the bottom.

An alternative name for carbonic maceration is "whole grape fermentation", which is distinct from the process of "whole bunch fermentation" common in the Burgundy wine production of Pinot noir. With "whole bunch fermentation", whole clusters of grapes (including stems) are fermented before being crushed. This builds a large "cap" of grape skins, with pathways created by the stems, allowing juice to flow more evenly through caps, increasing the levels of skin contact, or maceration.

== Coffee production ==
Carbonic maceration techniques (e.g. semi-carbonic maceration) have recently been adapted to coffee processing. The ripe coffee cherries are placed inside a hermetic stainless steel tank and left to undergo an anaerobic fermentation. This fermentation process brings out intense aromas, with a taste profile akin to red wine and whisky. These coffee beans usually produce a full-body cup. Known varieties processed with semi-carbonic maceration are Red and Yellow Catuai. Details of fermentation techniques have recently appeared in various specialty coffee media.
