= Maison Louis Jadot =

French winery

Louis Jadot
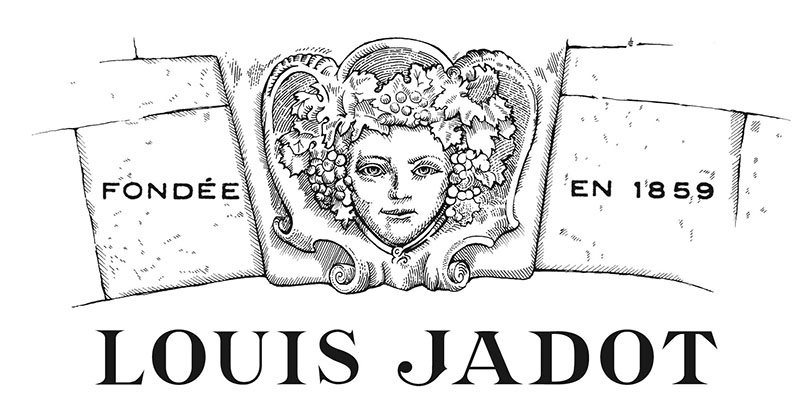
- Location: France
- Founded: 1859
- Parent company: Maison Louis Jadot
- Area cultivated: 270 hectares (670 acres)
- Distribution: International
- Website: louisjadot.com/en

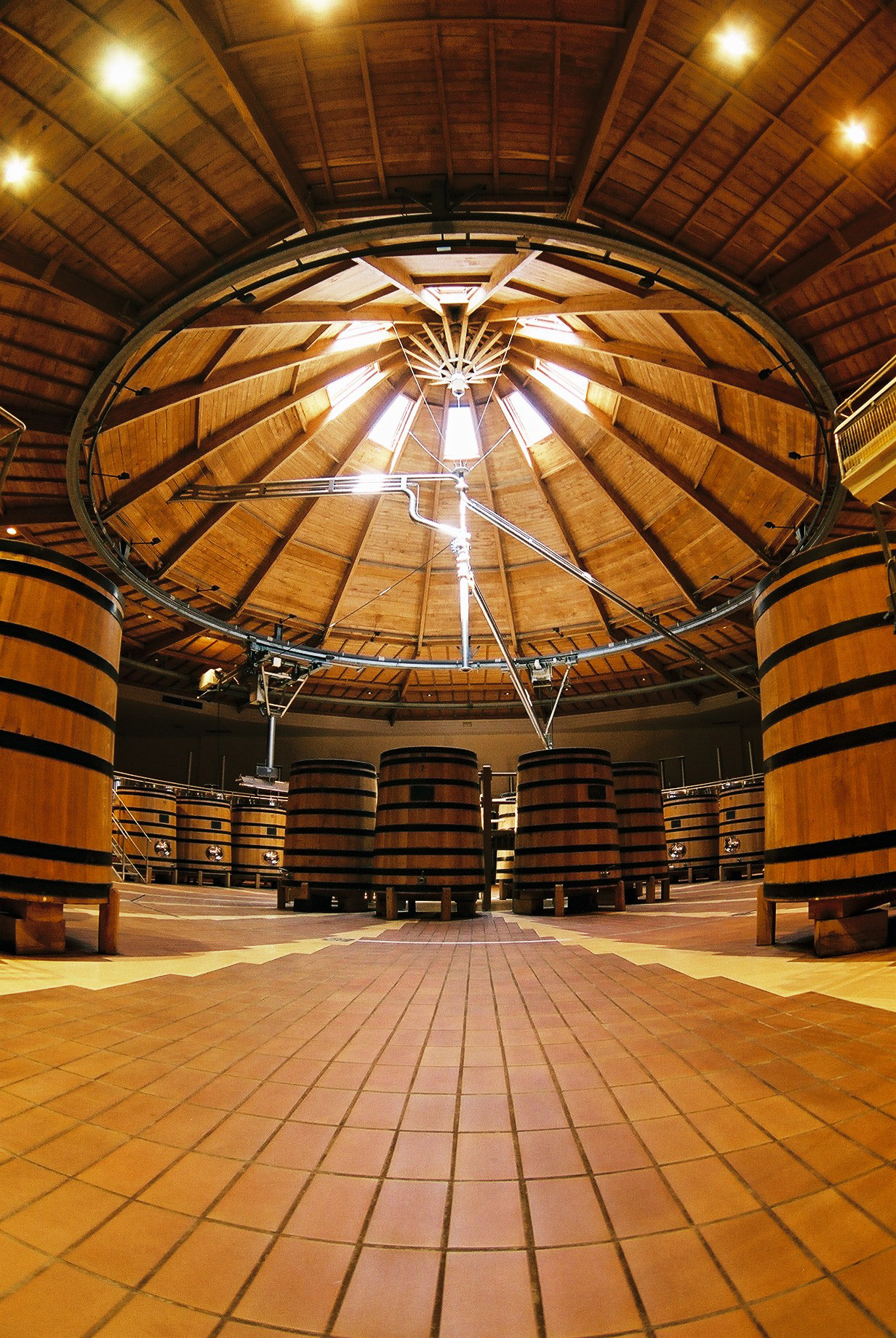
The Louis Jadot Winery

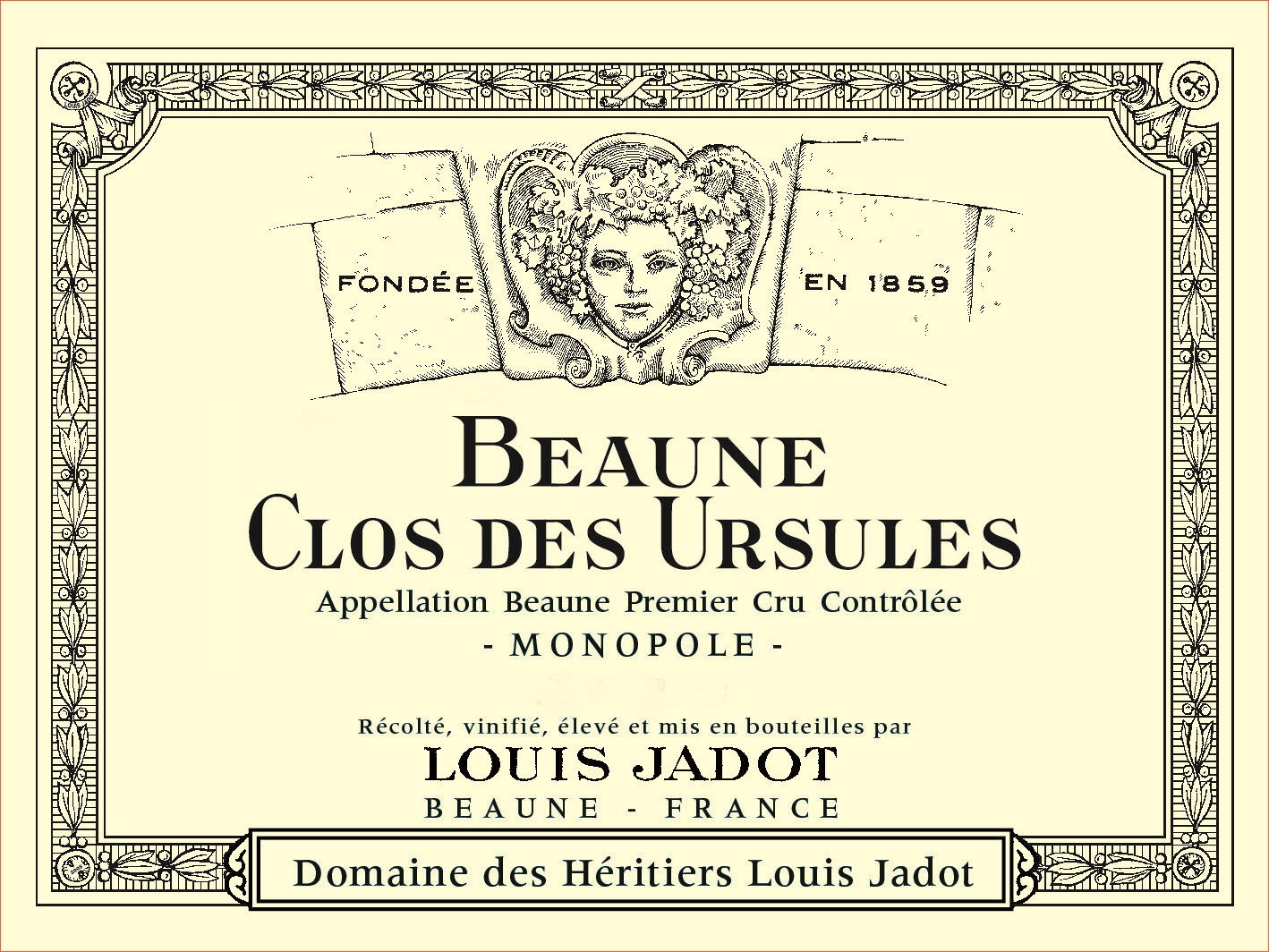
The Clos des Ursules carries the text "Domaine des Héritiers Louis Jadot", which means it is from the domaine vineyard rather than from the négociant business.

Maison Louis Jadot (or Louis Jadot; pronounced [lwi ʒado]) is a winery that was founded by Louis Henry Denis Jadot in 1859. The first vineyard bought by the Jadot family is the Beaune vineyard, Clos des Ursules, in 1826.

The family wine company produces and markets Burgundy wine. It operates both its own vineyards and buys grapes from other growers. It controls 270 hectares (670 acres) of vineyards in Burgundy (including Beaujolais Crus), and produces only Appellation d'Origine Contrôlée (AOC) wines.

Louis Jadot owns vineyards in the Mâconnais region: Domaine Ferret in Fuissé and Château des Jacques in Moulin à Vent within the Beaujolais region. In 1996, Louis Jadot partnered with Tonnellerie Vicard and created its own cooperage called Cadus, in order to produce French oak barrels crafted in the Burgundian tradition.
