= B&H Lifes =

Japanese pet product supplier

B&H Lifes is a Japanese pet product supplier, best known for its non-alcoholic drinks for cats and dogs. The late 2013 launch of their "wine" for cats became an international story and was carried by cat and wine columns and magazines. Only one thousand of the 180mL cat wine bottles were put on sale for the 2013 Christmas season, at 399 yen (US$4) each.

== Products ==
Dogs (Wan-Wan means woof-woof)

- Wan-Wan Sparkling Wine
- Wan-Wan Beer
- Wan-Wan energy drink
- Wan-Wan English Tea

Cats (Nyan Nyan means meow meow)

- Nyan Nyan Nouveau, or Meow Nouveau: "Nouveau" is a reference to the French wine Beaujolais nouveau, which is popular in Japan.

== Development and reception ==
The product was developed by the Japanese firm B&H Lifes following reports of consumer demand for specialized feline gifts. Masahito Tsurumi, the company's chief executive, stated that the beverage was intended to address a perceived disparity in the pet accessory market, noting that while products such as apparel and eyewear were readily available for dogs, comparable luxury items for cats were absent.

Despite its commercial intent, the beverage's composition, consisting of catnip, vitamin C, and Cabernet grape juice resulted in low palatability during initial trials. Data provided by B&H Lifes indicated that only 10 percent of feline subjects participated in consumption during product testing.
