= Château des Jacques =

French wine producer

Château des Jacques is a wine producer located in Moulin-à-Vent, in the north of the Beaujolais region. The 88 hectares of vineyards are spread over six appellations located in Moulin-à-Vent, Morgon, Chénas and Fleurie. Vineyards included in the domaine's holdings include: Grand Clos de Rochegrès, Clos du Grand Carquelin, Champ de Cour, La Roche, Clos des Thorins, La Rochelle and Côte du Py.

== History ==
Since 1996, Château des Jacques has been owned by Maison Louis Jadot, one of the early-stage investors in Beaujolais.

Cyril Chirouze currently runs the wine domain at Château des Jacques.

== Reception ==
In 2016, the Bettane & Desseauve wine guide gave Château des Jacques 3 stars, stating "A viticulture respecting soil life, a meticulous vinification and a balanced ageing. Everything contributes to give great wines from Beaujolais, which will perfectly age in time."
