= Beaujolais nouveau =

Type of wine

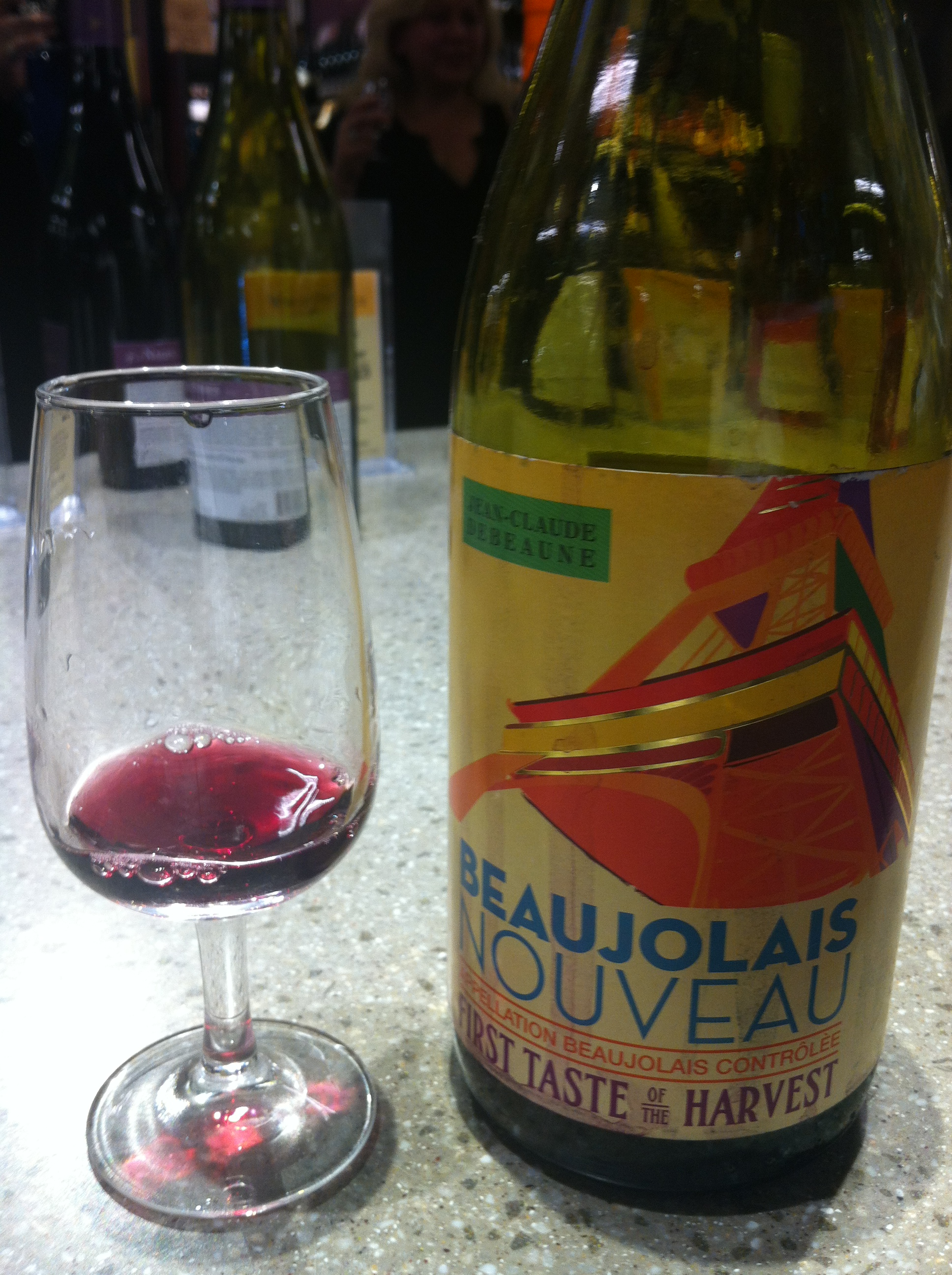
- Appellation: Beaujolais
- Varietal: Gamay

Beaujolais nouveau (/ˌboʊʒəˈleɪ nuːˈvoʊ/ BOH-zhə-LAY noo-VOH, French: [boʒɔlɛ nuvo]) is a red wine made from Gamay grapes produced in the Beaujolais region of France. It is a vin de primeur, fermented just a few weeks before being released for sale on the third Thursday of November. Distributors compete to get the first bottles to different global markets. In 2024, Beaujolais nouveau sold 14.3 million bottles worldwide, representing 22% of the total production of the Beaujolais vineyards.

== History ==
As far back as the 1800s, Beaujolais growers would gather to celebrate the end of the harvest by toasting the vintage with some of the young wine produced that year (this is part of the French tradition of vin de primeur, or "early wines", released in the same year as harvest, which 55 appellations in France are allowed to produce). During this time, Lyonnais barkeepers and restaurateurs had been buying barrels of this new Beaujolais wine, pressed in September and ready to serve in November. The new wine was served via pitchers dipped into barrels. The barrels were sometimes transported simply by floating them down the Saône river. Once the Beaujolais AOC was established in 1937, AOC rules meant that Beaujolais wine could only be officially sold after 15 December in the year of harvest. These rules were relaxed in November 1951, and the Union Interprofessionnelle des Vins du Beaujolais (Uivb) formally set 15 November as the release date for what would henceforth be known as Beaujolais nouveau. In 1985, the Institut National des Appellations d'Origine (INAO) established the third Thursday of November as a uniform release date for wine.

Some members of the UIVB saw the potential to market Beaujolais nouveau by capitalising on the vintage's rapid distribution, starting with a race to get the first bottles to Paris. In the 1960s, races from English clubs rewarded the drivers who returned the quickest with the most wine (sometimes resulting in spare tyres being left in Beaujolais). There continued to be more media coverage. By the 1970s, it had become a national event. The races spread to neighbouring European countries in the 1980s, followed by North America, and in the 1990s to Asia.

Until 1972, New York was the only US city to import Beaujolais nouveau. That year, Minneapolis became the second US city to import it; now, it is available in most US metropolitan areas and many large cities across the globe.

The release date of Beaujolais nouveau was set in 1985. Under French law, Beaujolais nouveau is released at 00:01 am on the third Thursday of November.

== Production ==
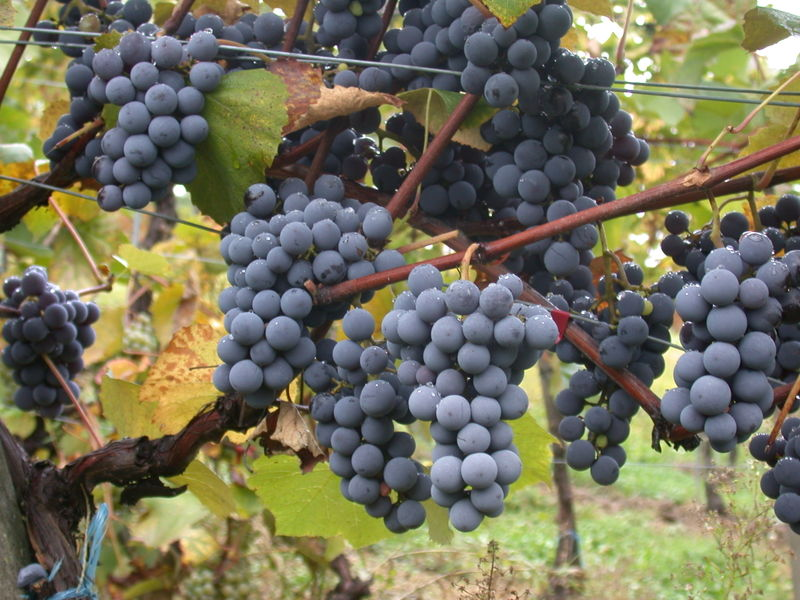
The Gamay grape used to produce Beaujolais Nouveau

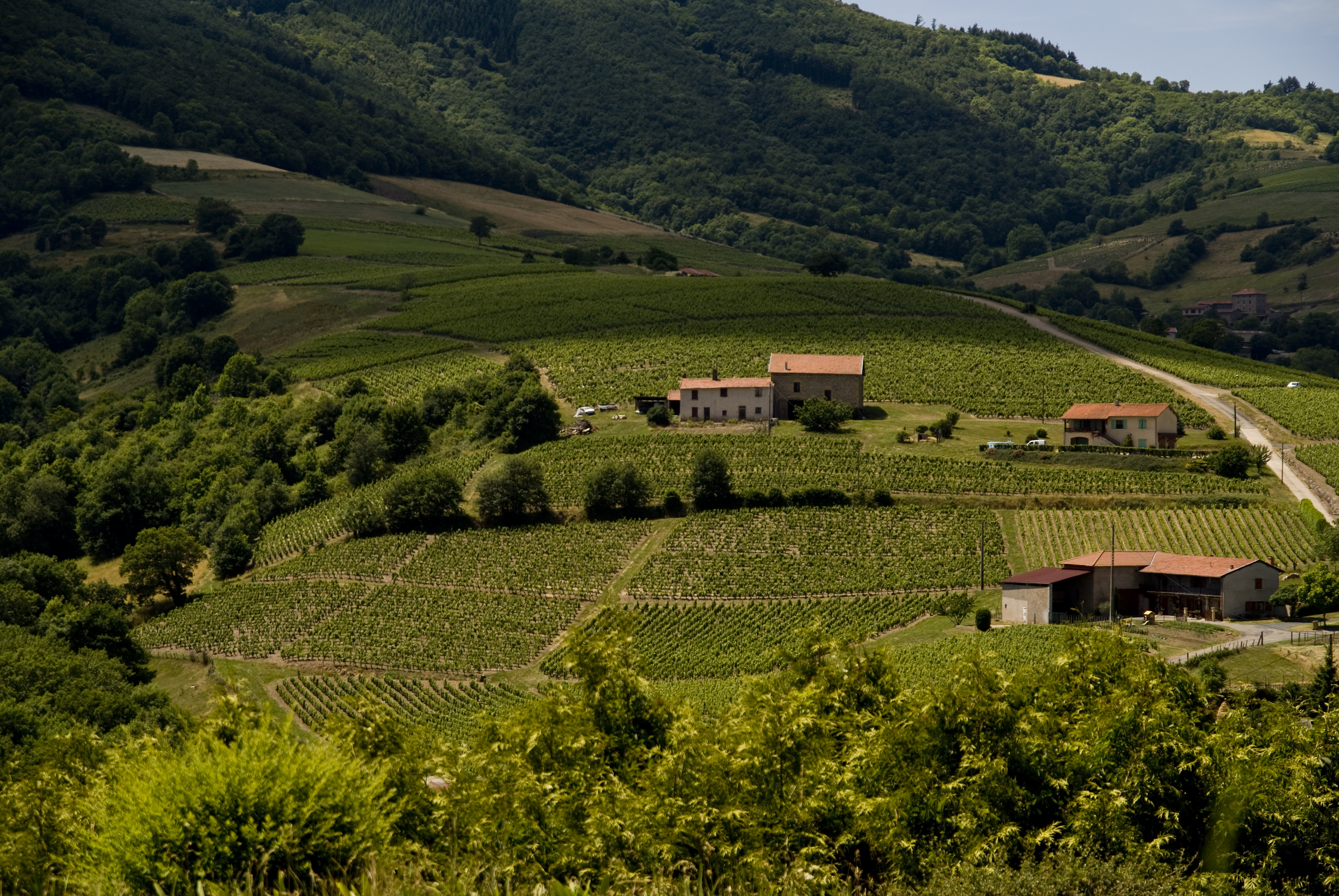
Vineyards in the Beaujolais wine region, located just south of Burgundy

Beaujolais Nouveau is made from the Gamay noir à Jus blanc grape, better known simply as Gamay. The grapes come from the southern part of the Beaujolais AOC, grown in "stony, schistous soils" just north of Lyon. Both Beaujolais Nouveau and Beaujolais-Villages Nouveau are produced; the latter comes from the ~ 30 non-cru villages in the northern part of the region, and grapes from the ten Beaujolais "cru" villages/appellations are excluded. Nouveau's production has ranged from 25% to almost 50% of Beaujolais's overall output. As of 2017, 2000 producers are making 27.5 million cases from 4,000 vineyards, with 40% exported from France. There had been a trend away from Beaujolais-Village Nouveau; there is some indication that these wines are returning.

By law, all grapes in the region must be harvested by hand. The wine is made using carbonic maceration, whole berry anaerobic fermentation, which emphasises fruit flavours without extracting bitter tannins from the grape skins. Grapes are loaded and sealed into a large (on the order of 20,000-U.S.-gallon (76,000 L)) sealed container that is filled with carbon dioxide. Grapes gently crushed at the bottom of the container by their own weight start to ferment, emitting more CO_{2}. All this carbon dioxide causes fermentation inside the uncrushed grapes (without access to oxygen, hence "anaerobic fermentation"). The resulting wine is fresh, fruity, and very low in tannins.

Part of the success of Beaujolais Nouveau is due to the Gamay grape – it can easily make this very straightforward wine, and make more complex wines. Most other red wine grapes would not easily make nouveau-style wines."

The wine is marketed for drinking in November, only a few months after the grapes were on the vines, and the logistics of shipping so much wine quickly are a significant challenge. Means of transport have included: elephant, Concorde, balloon, rickshaw, helicopter, private jet, military jet, and Boeing 747. Multiple air shipping companies even have online articles about how they arrange the nouveau air shipments, and the announcement of when the nouveau may be released from the EU is an annual headline.

In 2004, Japan was the leading importer of Beaujolais nouveau, purchasing 12.5 million bottles. Japan thus surpassed Germany, which imported 4.5 million bottles that year. By 2005, Beaujolais nouveau was sold in 150 countries.

In 2024, 14.3 million bottles of Beaujolais nouveau were sold worldwide, including 9 million in France, representing 22% of the Beaujolais vineyards' total production.

== Celebration ==
Evolution of Duboeuf nouveau labels over time

This "Beaujolais Day" is accompanied by publicity events and heavy advertising. The traditional slogan, even in English-speaking countries, was "Le Beaujolais nouveau est arrivé!" (literally, "The new Beaujolais has arrived!"), but in 2005, this was changed to "It's Beaujolais Nouveau Time!". In the United States, it is promoted as a drink for Thanksgiving, which always falls exactly one week after the wine is released (on the fourth Thursday of November).

To celebrate Beaujolais Day, events are organised throughout the United Kingdom, including in Cardiff. Beaujolais Day, or "Beaujolais Nouveau Day", is particularly popular in Swansea, Wales, where people book tables in restaurants and bars for the day up to a year in advance. Historian Peter Stead argues that its rise in popularity there can be traced to the city's No Sign Bar in the 1960s, which was then owned by former Wales rugby union captain Clem Thomas, who owned a house in Burgundy and could transport Beaujolais quickly and cheaply to south Wales, and suggests that it reflected Swansea's efforts to "gentrify and intellectualise itself" at the time. In 2015, it was estimated that Beaujolais Day contributed £5 million to the local economy.

More recently, several bars across Swansea have launched special events to mark Beaujolais Day, including the Morgans Hotel, which sees more than 1,000 people through its doors each year for its locally renowned annual Beaujolais Day event.

As of 2014, over 100 Beaujolais Nouveau-related festivals were held in the Beaujolais region. One such festival, Les Sarmentelles, was held in Beaujeu, the region's capital, and lasted for days. The winner of the annual tasting contest won their weight in wine.

Many producers release the nouveau with a colourful or abstract design that changes each year, usually as an evolution of the previous year's design. Starting in 2017, one producer held a contest for its Beaujolais Nouveau label; by 2020, there were over 1,000 entries. Duboeuf has silk ties made each year with their label's abstract design, and releases them through select wholesalers and distributors.

In addition to drinking Beaujolais Nouveau, its release also offers chefs an opportunity to cook with the wine. Due to its very young age and fermentation method, the foods prepared with nouveau tend to be a bit more purple than red. This is especially evident in coq au vin and poached pears, traditional dishes from Burgundy.

== Style ==
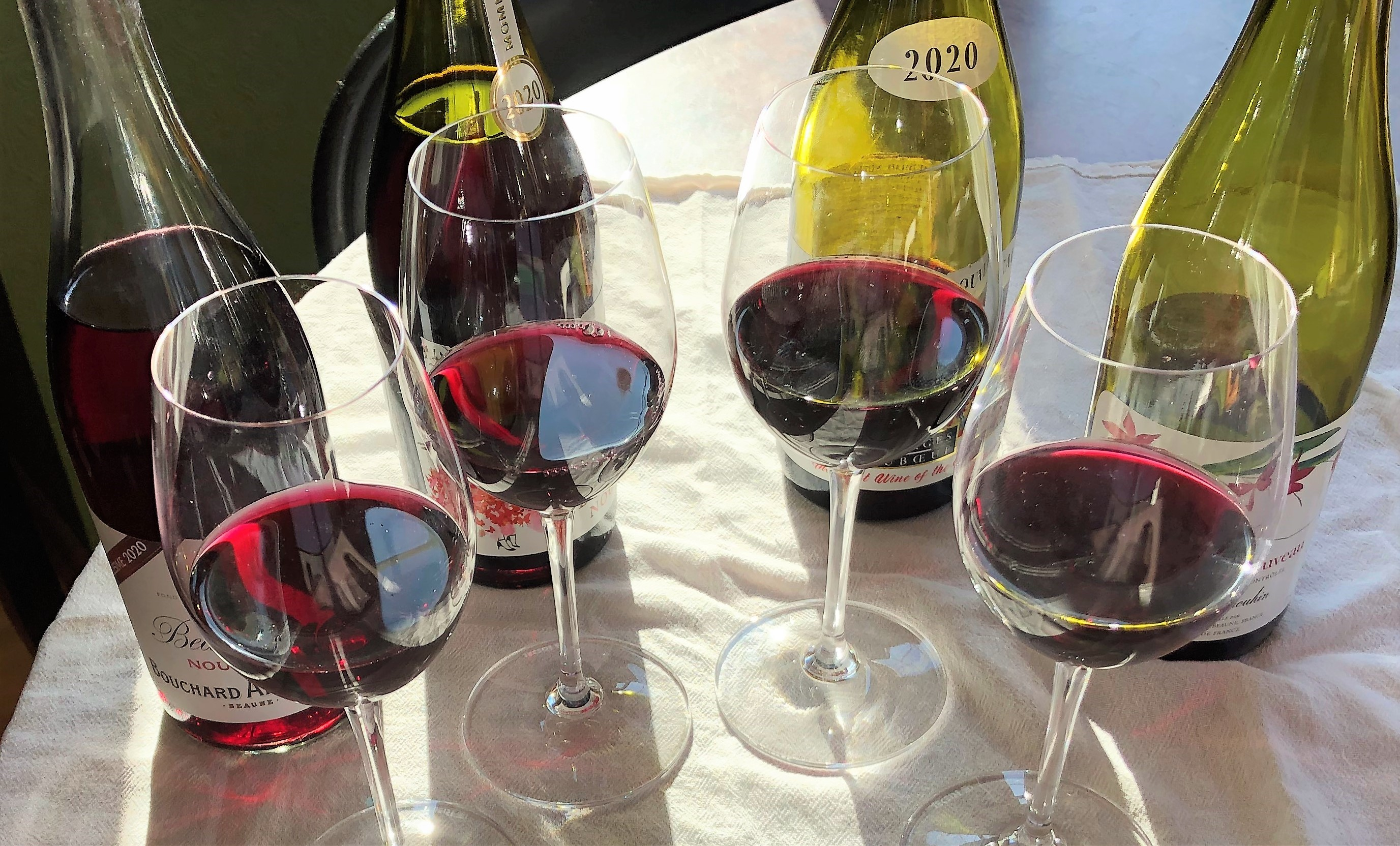
Beaujolais nouveau wine

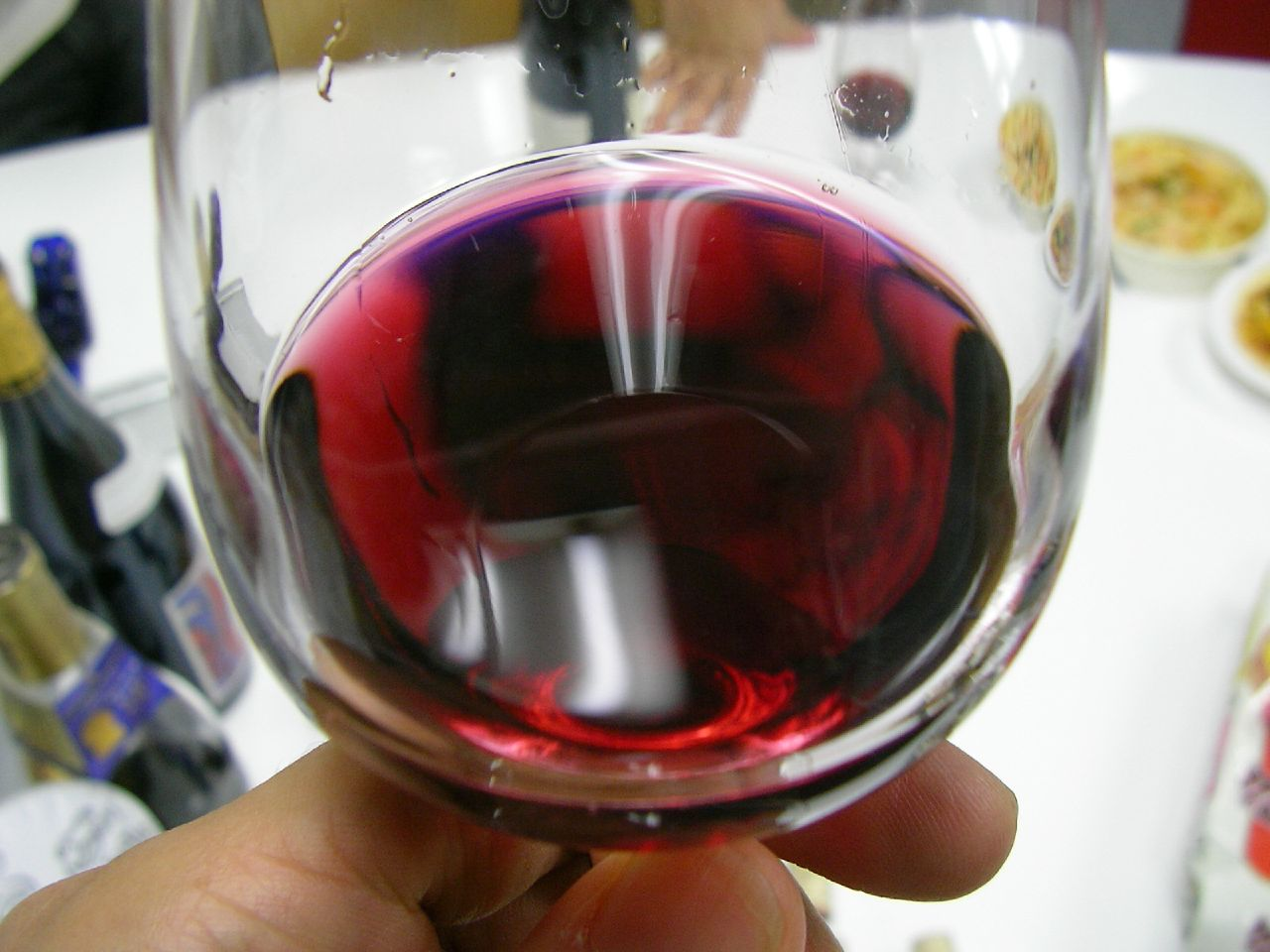
Beaujolais nouveau wine

Beaujolais nouveau is a purple-pink wine reflecting its youth, bottled only 6–8 weeks after harvest. The method of production means that there is a higher acidity and very little tannin. Nouveau will have very bright, fresh, red fruit flavours, such as cherry, strawberry, and raspberry, along with fruity ester flavours of banana, grape, fig, and pear drop. The wine is recommended to be slightly chilled to 13 °C (55 °F). Beaujolais-Villages Nouveau tends to be a bit more purple, richer, and has more intense fruity flavours.

Beaujolais nouveau is intended for immediate drinking. It has been described as "wine of this vintage, fresh as the memory of harvest and raw as the experience of the year, unpolished by time, a reflection of the emotion of the moment". In this same spirit, nouveau is intended to be consumed within a few months. While nouveau could be kept for a few years, there is no real reason to, as it does not improve with age (for comparison, standard Beaujolais AOC wines are released the following year and can be stored for one or more years before consuming). The nouveau wines show definite variation between vintages and, as such, are considered to be an early indicator of the quality of the year's regional wine harvest. Similar to non-nouveau wines, Beaujolais-Village Nouveau wines tend to be a bit richer and more flavorful.

For a period around the late 1990s, some wine critics criticised Beaujolais nouveau as simple or immature. For example, wine critic Karen MacNeil wrote that "Drinking it gives you the same kind of silly pleasure as eating cookie dough." Another wine critic, Robert M. Parker, Jr., disagreed, calling those opinions "ludicrous" and describing the better vintages as "delicious, zesty, exuberant, fresh, vibrantly fruity" wines. According to Julien Gobert, an oenologist who worked in the Bordeaux region, "It is a proper wine and it's not actually that easy to produce. It's quite a challenge getting it right."

== Similar wines ==
The commercial success of Beaujolais nouveau led to the development of other "primeur" wines in different parts of France, such as the Gaillac AOC near Toulouse. These wines are typically released on the third Thursday of November, just as their counterparts in Beaujolais are. The practice has spread to other wine-producing countries such as Italy ("Vino Novello"), Spain ("vino joven"), the Czech Republic ("Svatomartinské víno") and the US ("nouveau wine").

In the United States, several vintners have produced Nouveau-style wines, using various grapes such as Gamay, Zinfandel, Tempranillo, Pinot noir, and even Riesling. There is also a movement in the US to make nouveau wines in homage to the French Glou-Glou wine movement and in homage to Beaujolais nouveau. In Japan, B&H Lifes created a Nouveau wine for cats inspired by Beaujolais nouveau, which is popular in Japan. It is named Nyan Nyan Nouveau, or Meow Nouveau.

== See also ==
- List of vins de primeur
