= Moulin-à-Vent AOC =

French wine

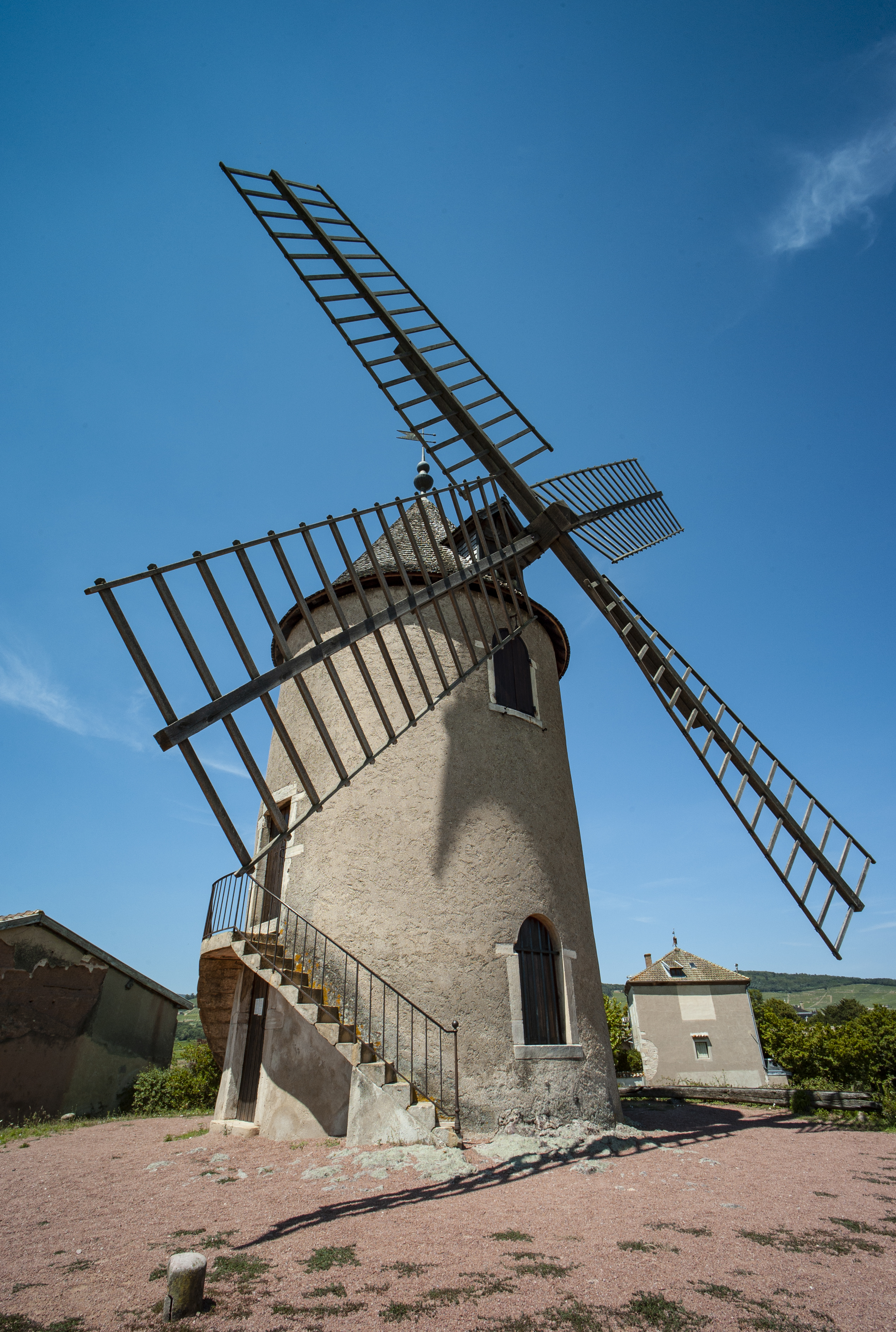
The eponymous windmill

Moulin-à-Vent (/muˌlɑːnæˈvɑːn/ moo-LAH-nav-AHN; French pronunciation: [mu.lɛ̃ a vɑ̃]) is a French red wine produced on the border between the Rhône and Saône-et-Loire departments. The appellation covers part of the towns of Chénas and Romanèche-Thorins, in the Beaujolais vineyards. It is one of the 10 crus, which are from north to south: le Saint-Amour, le Juliénas, le Chénas, le Moulin-à-Vent, le Fleurie, le Chiroubles, le Morgon, le Régnié, le Brouilly and le Côte-de-Brouilly.

This wine was sold before 1936 under the name of "Romanèche-Thorins" which was at the time a Beaujolais cru. The name was changed to Moulin-à-Vent ('windmill') when it was recognized by the National Institute of Origin and Quality (INAO) as a controlled designation of origin (AOC) by decree on September 11, 1936.

== Gallery ==
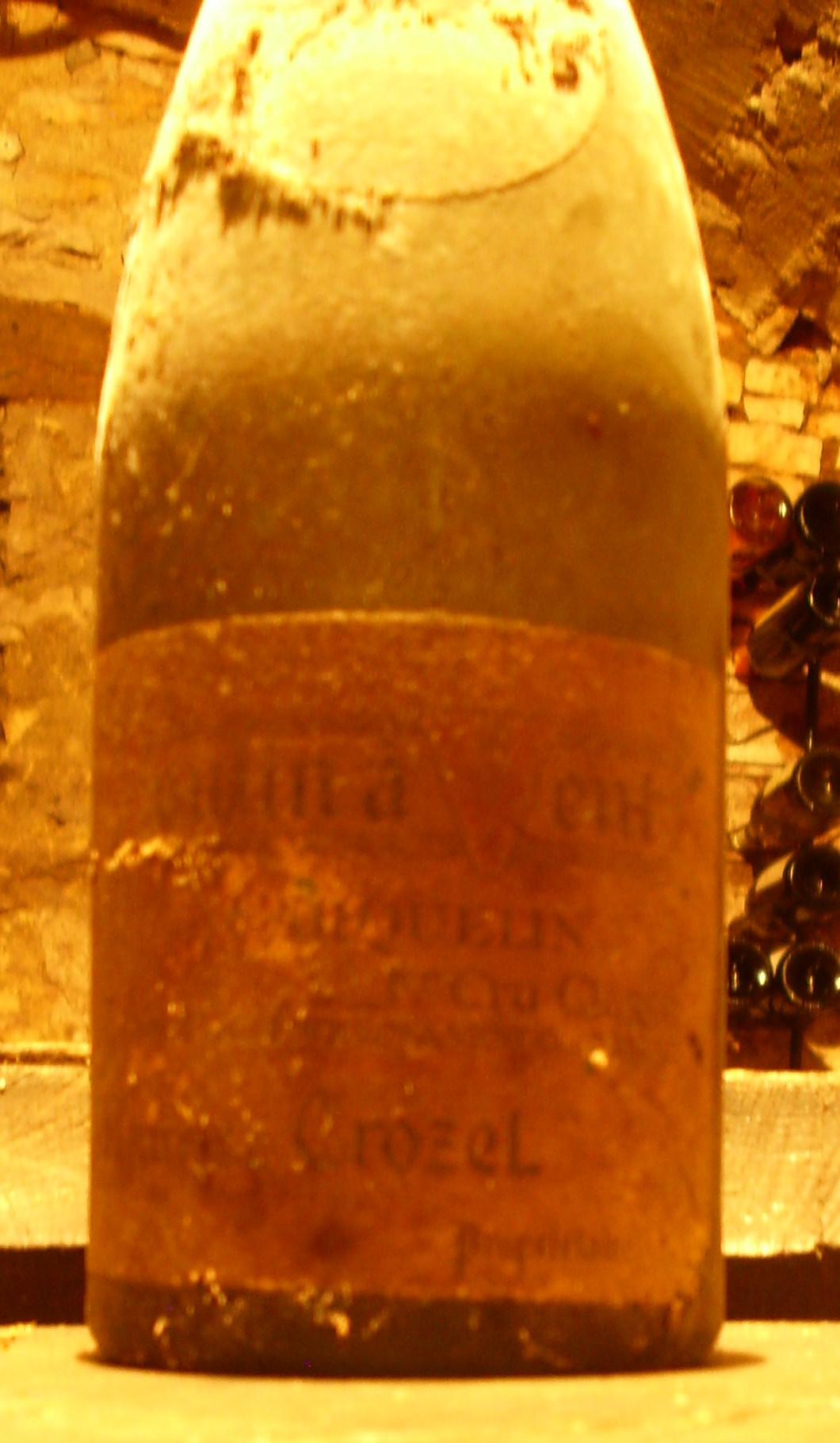
Moulin-à-vent 1947 bottle

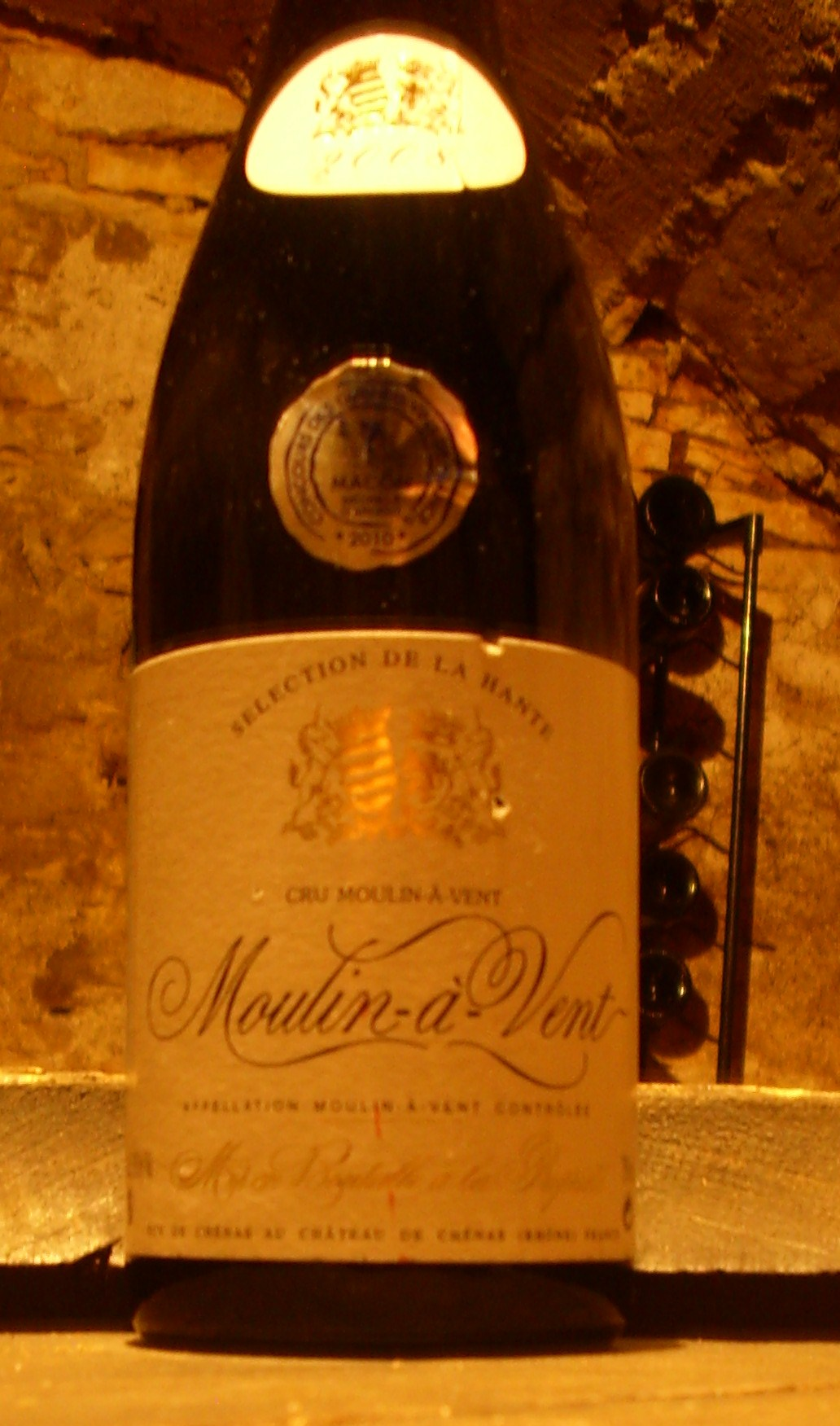
Moulin-à-vent 2008 bottle
