= Gamay Beaujolais =

Variety of grape

Gamay Beaujolais (French pronunciation: [ɡamɛ boʒɔlɛ]) is a varietal designation for a Californian grape variety, an early ripening clone of Pinot noir. It is named after the Gamay grape from Beaujolais.

== History ==
In the late 1930s, an early pioneer of the American viticulture, Paul Masson, brought with him several Burgundian grapes for his winery in California. One of those grapes he believed to be the Gamay variety from the Beaujolais region in France, which in the 1940s University of California, Davis (UCD) researchers christened "Gamay Beaujolais".

In the late 1960s, UCD scientists decided that Gamay Beaujolais was a clonal selection of Pinot noir, and that California's version of the true Gamay was in fact the Napa Gamay.

Moreover, Masson's Napa Gamay was found to not be a Gamay at all, but the Valdiguié grape from Languedoc-Roussillon.

=== Label ban ===
The US Alcohol and Tobacco Tax and Trade Bureau (TTB) subsequently discouraged the use of the term "Gamay Beaujolais" and ruled that, from 1997, it could only be used as a secondary designation on wines made from more than 75% Pinot noir or Valdiguié. Since April 2007, the term "Gamay Beaujolais" has been banned from labels in the United States.
