= Nouveau =

French wine

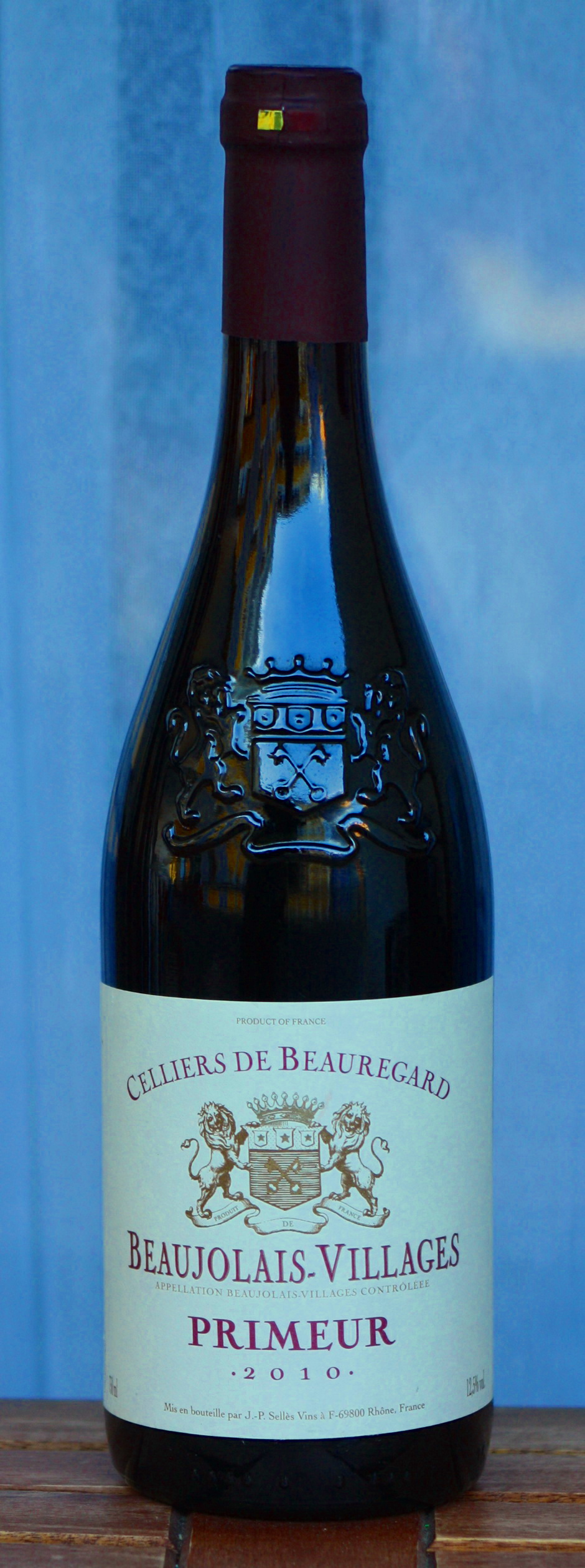

A nouveau (English: /nuːˈvoʊ/ French pronunciation: [nuvo]), or vin (de) primeur, is a wine which may be sold in the same year in which it was harvested.

The most widely exported nouveau wine is French wine Beaujolais nouveau which is released on the third Thursday of November, often only a few weeks after the grapes were harvested.

Nouveau wines are often light bodied and paler in color due to the very short (or nonexistent) maceration period followed by a similarly short fermentation. The wines will most likely not be exposed to any oak or extended aging prior to being released to the market. Nouveau wines are characteristically fruity and may have some residual sugar. They are at their peak drinkability within the first year. As of 2005, there were 55 AOCs in France permitted to make nouveau wines.

Vins de primeur should not be confused with the practice of buying and selling wines en primeur.

In Italy, nouveau wine is called "Vino Novello".

== See also ==
- List of vins de primeur
- Federweisser
- Vino Novello
- Vinho Verde
