= Valdiguié =

Variety of grape

Valdiguié is a red wine grape grown primarily in the Languedoc-Roussillon region of southern France, where it is generally known by the alias Gros Auxerrois. In California it has been known as Napa Gamay or Gamay 15. Until 1980 Napa Gamay was believed to be the Gamay of Beaujolais, but following genetic analysis the name "Napa Gamay" has been banned from U.S. wine labels since June 23, 1997. Confusingly, both the Pinot noir clone Gamay Beaujolais and Valdiguié were sometimes also labelled as "Gamay Beaujolais" until that name was banned on labels in April 2007.

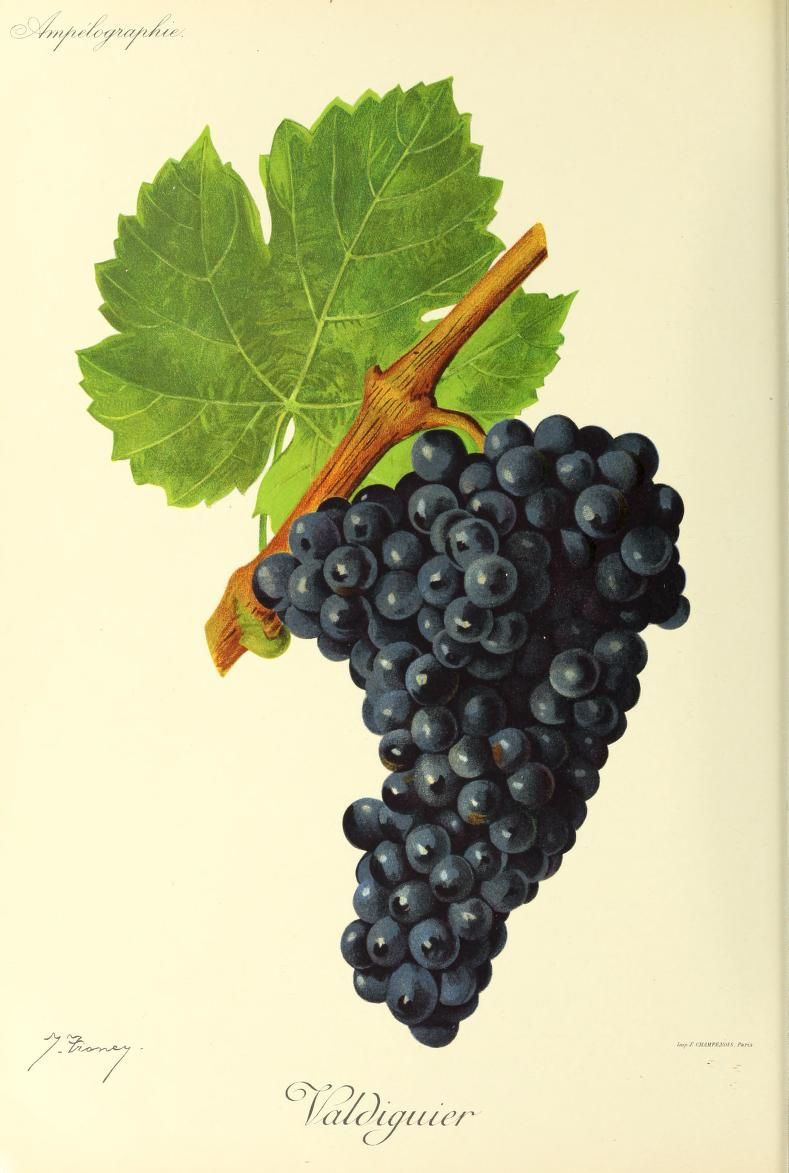
Valdiguié N

Other synonyms include Valdiguer, Cahors, Jean-Pierrou at Sauzet, Quercy and Noir de Chartres.

== Description ==
Valdiguié was first commercially propagated in 1874, although its origin is unclear. There are three main theories :

- M. Valdiguié (1745-1817) selected a seedling from the Merille variety
- Guillaume Valdiguié found it in the vineyard of a Templar monastery in Aujols
- Jean Baptiste Valdiguié found it in a vineyard in Puylaroque and sold it from 1874

It produces medium to large conical clusters of dark blue-black fruit. It is a high yielding vine that is fairly resistant to oidium (powdery mildew).

== Cultivation and winemaking ==
Valdiguié produces dark colored wines that are low in alcohol. The wines tend to be of light to medium body and are frequently made in a style similar to the true Gamay of Beaujolais.
