= Beaujolais =

Wine from the Beaujolais region of France

- Wine region
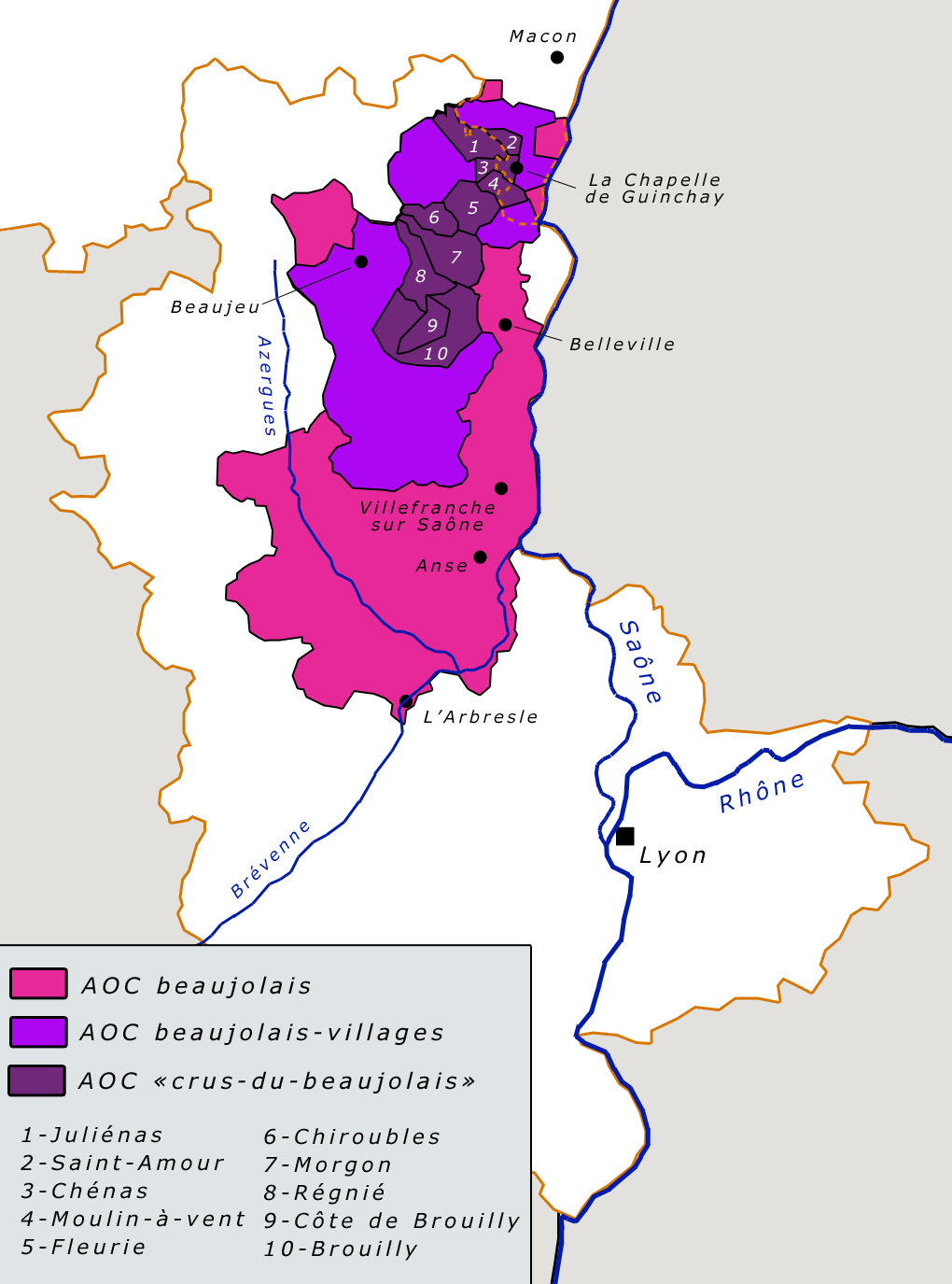
- Type: Appellation d'origine contrôlée
- Year established: 1936
- Country: France
- Part of: Burgundy; 46.15°N 4.65°E
- Soil conditions: Granite, schist, clay and sandstone
- Total area: 10,500 ha
- Grapes produced: Gamay with a little Pinot noir (and the local variation of Pinot Liébault), Chardonnay, Aligoté, Pinot gris (known locally as Pinot Beurot), Pinot blanc and Melon de Bourgogne
- Wine produced: Beaujolais, Beaujolais Villages, cru Beaujolais, Beaujolais Nouveau

Beaujolais (/ˌboʊʒəˈleɪ/ boh-zhə-LAY, French: [boʒɔlɛ]) is a French appellation d'origine contrôlée (AOC) wine in the Burgundy region. Red Beaujolais wines are generally made of the Gamay grape, which has a thin skin and is low in tannin, but like most AOC wines they are not labeled varietally. Whites, 1% of production, are made mostly with Chardonnay, though Aligoté was also permitted until 2024. Beaujolais tends to be a very light-bodied red wine, with relatively high acidity. In some vintages, Beaujolais produces more wine than the Burgundy wine regions of Chablis, Côte d'Or, Côte Chalonnaise, and Mâconnais put together.

The wine takes its name from the historical Province of Beaujolais. It is located north of Lyon, in the departments of Rhône and Saône-et-Loire. While administratively part of the Burgundy wine region, the climate is closer to that of the Rhône, and the wine is sufficiently individual in character to be considered apart from Burgundy and Rhône. The region is known internationally for its long tradition of winemaking, for the use of carbonic maceration, and more recently for the popular Beaujolais nouveau.

== History ==
The region of Beaujolais was first cultivated by the Romans who planted the areas along its trading route up the Saône valley. The most noticeable Roman vineyard was Brulliacus located on the hillside of Mont Brouilly. The Romans also planted vineyards in the area around Morgon. From the 7th century through the Middle Ages, most of the viticulture and winemaking was done by the Benedictine monks. In the 10th century, the region got its name from the town of Beaujeu and was ruled by the Lords of Beaujeu until the 15th century when it was ceded to the Duchy of Burgundy. The wines from Beaujolais were mostly confined to the markets along the Saône and Rhône, particularly in the city of Lyon. The expansion of the French railroad system in the 19th century opened up the lucrative Paris market. The first mention of Beaujolais wines in English followed soon after when Cyrus Redding described the wines of Moulin-à-Vent and Saint-Amour as being low-priced and best consumed young.

In the 1980s, Beaujolais hit a peak of popularity in the world's wine market with its Beaujolais nouveau wine. Spurred on by the creative marketing from wine merchants such as Georges Duboeuf, demand outpaced supply for the easy-drinking, fruity wines. As more Beaujolais producers tried to capitalize on the "Nouveau craze", production of regular Beaujolais dropped and an eventual backlash occurred in the late 1990s and early 21st century. By this point, the whole of Beaujolais wine had developed a negative reputation among consumers who associated Gamay based wines with the slightly sweet, simple light bodied wines that characterized Beaujolais Nouveau. Producers were left with a wine surplus that French authorities compelled them to reduce through mandatory distillation. In response, there has been renewed emphasis on the production of more complex wines that are aged longer in oak barrels prior to release. Recent years have seen a rise in the number of terroir driven estate-bottled wines made from single vineyards or in one of the Cru Beaujolais communes, where the name of the commune is allowed to be displayed on the label.

=== Gamay grape ===
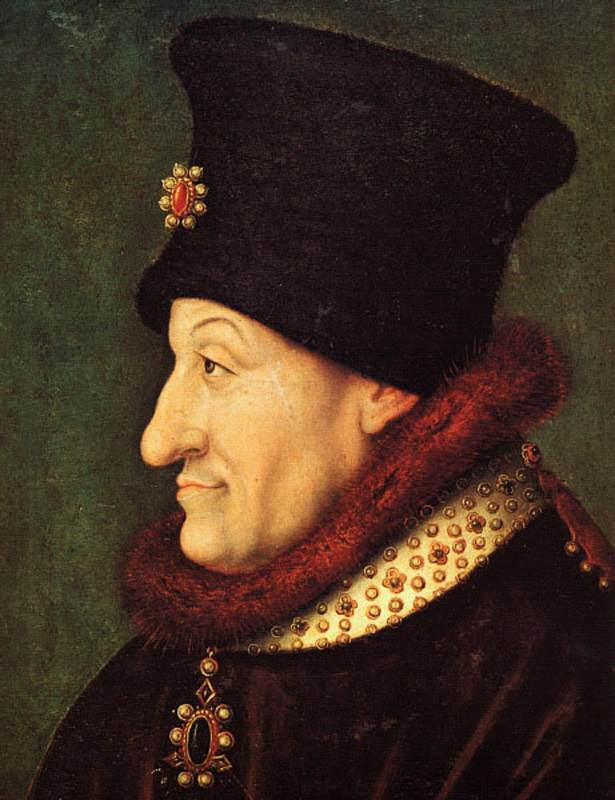
When Philippe the Bold outlawed the cultivation of Gamay in Burgundy, it pushed the grape south to the Beaujolais region.

Gamay noir is a cross of pinot noir and the ancient white variety Gouais, a Central European variety that was probably introduced to northeastern France by the Romans. The grape brought relief to the village growers following the decline of the Black Death. Gamay ripened two weeks earlier than Pinot Noir and was easier to grow. It also produced a strong, fruitier wine in a much larger abundance. In July 1395, the Duke of Burgundy, Philippe the Bold, outlawed the cultivation of Gamay as being "a very bad and disloyal plant", due in part to the variety occupying land that could be used for the more "elegant" pinot noir. Sixty years later, Philippe the Good issued another edict against Gamay, in which he stated that the reason for the ban was because "[t]he Dukes of Burgundy are known as the lords of the best wines in Christendom. We will maintain our reputation". The edicts had the effect of pushing Gamay plantings southward, out of the main region of Burgundy and into the granite-based soils of Beaujolais, where the grape thrived.

=== Scandals ===
Following the 2001 vintage, over 1.1 million cases of Beaujolais wine (most of it Beaujolais Nouveau) had to be destroyed or distilled due to lackluster sales as part of a consumer backlash against the popularity of Beaujolais Nouveau. In an interview given to local newspaper Lyon Mag, French wine critic François Mauss claimed that the reason for the backlash was the poor quality of Beaujolais Nouveau that had flooded the market in recent decades. He claimed that Beaujolais producers had long ignored the warning signs that such a backlash was coming and continued to produce what Mauss termed "vin de merde" ("shit wine"). This triggered an outcry among Beaujolais producers, followed by an association of 56 cooperative producers filing a lawsuit against Lyon Mag for publishing Mauss's comments.

Rather than sue for libel, the producers sued under an obscure French law that punishes the denigration of French products. In January 2003, the court in Villefranche-sur-Saône found in favor of the Beaujolais producers and awarded USD$350,000, which would have put the small employee-owned publication out of business. The bad publicity garnered from the "shit wine case" was extensive, with several publications such as Le Monde, The Times, The New York Times and the Herald Tribune running critical or satirical articles in response to the court's decision. In 2005, the highest court of appeal reversed the decision and found that there was no cause for action against the publication; the Beaujolais winemakers were ordered to pay €2,000 (US$2,442) in court costs to Lyon Mag.

In 2005, the Vins Georges Duboeuf company was charged with mixing low-grade wine with better vintages after a patchy 2004 harvest. Georges Duboeuf denied wrongdoing, blaming human error and pointing out that none of the affected wine was released to consumers. The production manager directly responsible admitted his actions and resigned, and a court found that both "fraud and attempted fraud concerning the origin and quality of wines" had been committed. Fewer than 200,000 liters of the company's annual 270 million liter production were implicated, but L'Affaire Duboeuf, as it was called, was considered a serious scandal.

In December 2007, five people were arrested after reportedly selling nearly 600 tonnes of sugar to growers in Beaujolais. Up to 100 growers were accused of using the sugar for illegal chaptalization and also of exceeding volume quotas between 2004 and 2006.

== Climate and geography ==
Cru Beaujolais region of Régnié

Beaujolais is a large wine-producing region, larger than any single district of Burgundy. There are over 18,000 hectares (44,000 acres) of vines planted in a 34 miles (55 km) stretch of land that is between 7 and 9 miles (14 km) wide (11 to 14 km). The historical capital of the province is Beaujeu and its economic capital is Villefranche-sur-Saône. Many Beaujolais vineyards are found in the hillsides on the outskirts of Lyon in the eastern part of the region along the Saône valley. The Massif Central is to the west and has a tempering influence on the climate. The region is south of the Mâconnais, with a small overlap in AOC borders: growers in specific areas may produce white wines under the Saint-Véran AOC (Mâconnais) or red wines under the Beaujolais AOC.

The climate of Beaujolais is semi-continental with some temperate influences. The proximity of the Mediterranean Sea does impart some Mediterranean influence on the climate. The region is overall, warmer than Burgundy with vines that consistently fully ripen grapes. By the time that the Beaujolais Nouveau is released in late November, the foothills in the western regions will have normally seen snow. A common viticultural hazard is spring time frost.

The soils of Beaujolais divide the region into a northern and southern half, with the town of Villefranche serving as a near dividing point. The northern half of Beaujolais, where most of the Cru Beaujolais communes are located, includes rolling hills of schist and granite based soils with some limestone. On hillsides, most of the granite and schist is found in the upper slopes with the lower slopes having more stone and clay composition. The southern half of the region, also known as the Bas Beaujolais, has flatter terrain with richer, sandstone and clay based soils with some limestone patches. The Gamay grape fares differently in both regions-producing more structured, complex wines in the north and lighter, fruitier wines in the south. The angle of the hillside vineyards in the north exposes the grapes to more sunshine which leads to harvest at an earlier time than the vineyards in the south.

== Appellations ==
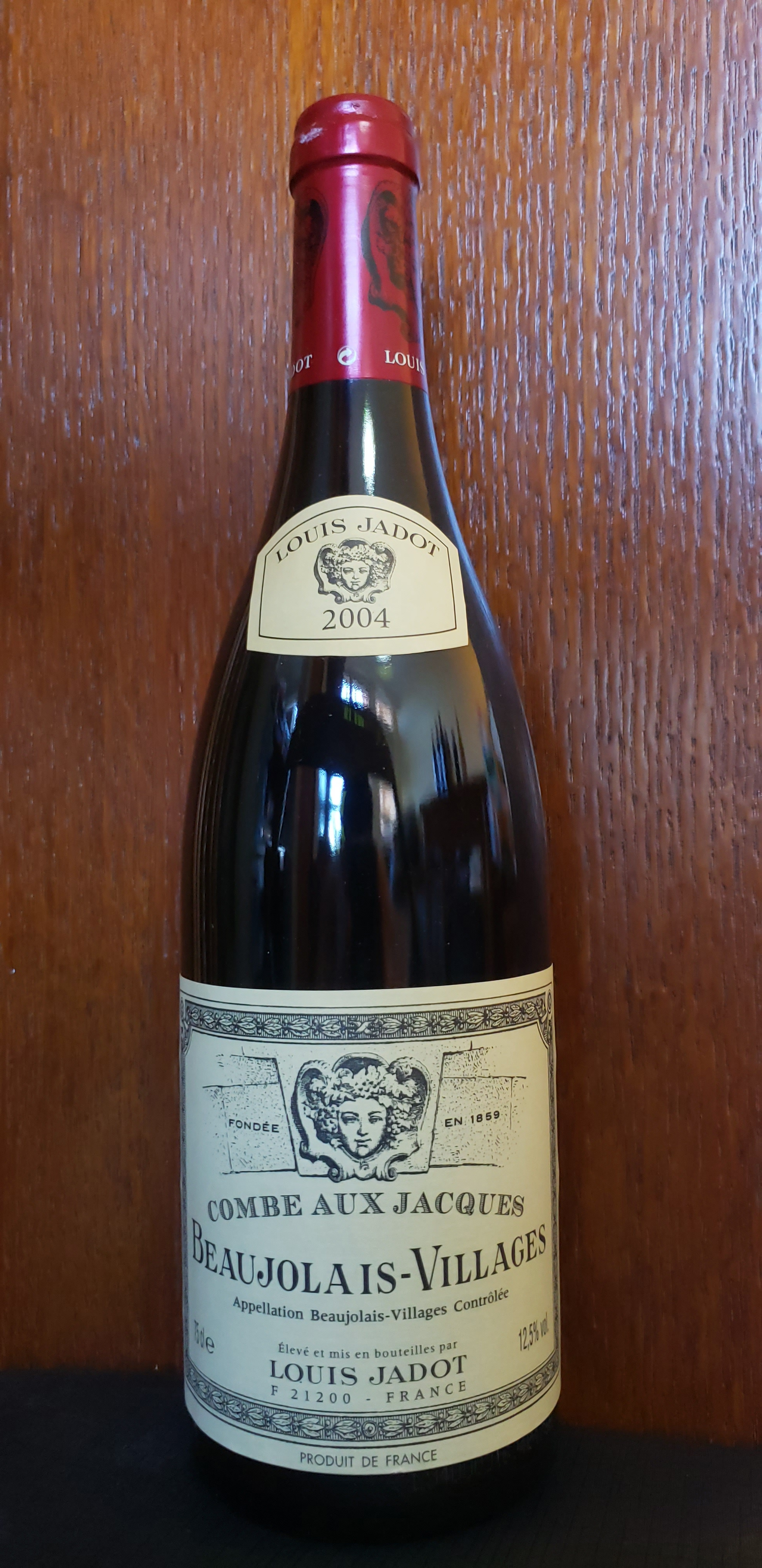
Louis Jadot Beaujolais-Villages AOC 2004

The new rules for Beaujolais appellations were issued by INAO in 2011. There are 12 main appellations of Beaujolais wines covering the production of more than 96 villages in the Beaujolais region. They were originally established in 1936, with additional crus being promoted in 1938 and 1946, plus Régnié in 1988. About half of all Beaujolais wine is sold under the basic Beaujolais AOC designation. The majority of this wine is produced in the southern Bas Beaujolais region located around the town of Belleville. The minimum natural alcohol level for the grapes is 10%, and the maximum yield is 60 hl/ha (65 hl/ha for a bumper crop) The wine may be labeled as Beaujolais Supérieur in case the minimum natural alcohol level for the grapes is 10,5%, and the maximum yield is 58 hl/ha (63 hl/ha for a bumper crop). Exactly the same limits are effective for Beaujolais-Villages. Maximum chaptalization levels are established at 3 g/L (glucose + fructose).

- Beaujolais AOC is the most extended appellation allowed to be used in any of the 96 villages, but essentially covering 60 villages, and refers to all basic Beaujolais wines. A large portion of the wine produced under this appellation is sold as Beaujolais Nouveau. Annually, this appellation averages around 75 million bottles a year in production. Maximum level of sulfur dioxide in the Nouveau is limited at 100 mg/L.
- Beaujolais-Villages AOC, the intermediate category in terms of classification, covers 39 communes/villages in the Haut Beaujolais, the northern part of the region accounting for a quarter of production. Some is sold as Beaujolais-Villages Nouveau, but it is not common. Most of the wines are released in the following March after the harvest. The terrain of this region is hillier with more schist and granite soil composition than is found in the regions of the Beaujolais AOC and the wine has the potential to be of higher quality. If the grapes come from the area of a single vineyard or commune, producers can affix the name of their particular village to the Beaujolais-Villages designation. Since most of the villages of Beaujolais, outside of those classified as Cru Beaujolais, have little international name recognition, most producers choose to maintain the Beaujolais-Villages designation. The maximum permitted yields for this AOC is 58 hl/ha. These wines are meant to be consumed young, within two years of their harvest. Several of the communes in the Beaujolais-Villages AOC also qualify to produce their wines under the Mâconnais and Saint-Véran AOCs. The Beaujolais producers that produce a red wine under the Beaujolais-Villages appellation will often produce their white wine under the more internationally recognized names of Mâcon-Villages or Saint-Véran.

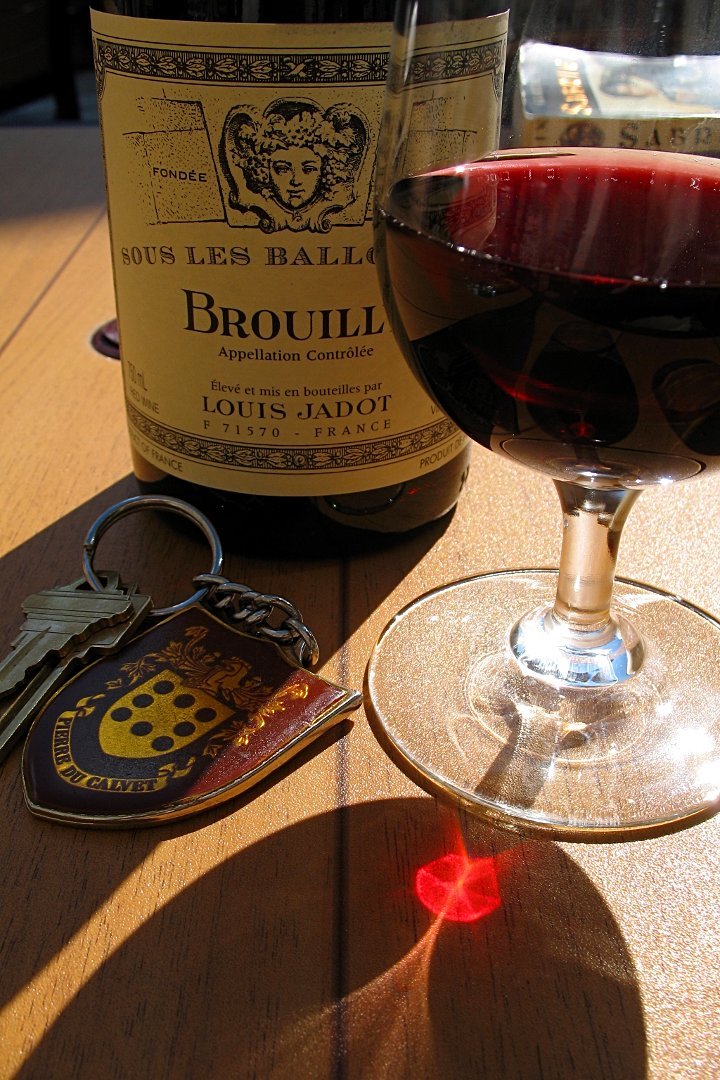
Cru Beaujolais from Brouilly

- Cru Beaujolais, the highest category of classification in Beaujolais, account for the production within ten villages/areas in the foothills of the Beaujolais mountains. Unlike Burgundy and Alsace, the phrase cru in Beaujolais refers to an entire wine-producing area rather than an individual vineyard. Seven of the Crus relate to actual villages while Brouilly and Côte de Brouilly refer to the vineyards areas around Mont Brouilly and Moulin-à-Vent is named for a local windmill. These wines do not usually show the word "Beaujolais" on the label, in an attempt to separate themselves from mass-produced Nouveau; in fact vineyards in the cru villages are not allowed to produce Nouveau. The maximum yields for Cru Beaujolais wine is 48 hl/ha. Their wines can be more full-bodied, darker in color, and significantly longer-lived. From north to south the Beaujolais crus are- Saint-Amour, Juliénas, Chénas, Moulin-à-Vent, Fleurie, Chiroubles, Morgon, Régnié, Brouilly and Côte de Brouilly.
- Beaujolais Blanc & Beaujolais Rosé – A small amount of white wine made from Chardonnay is grown in the region and used to produce Beaujolais Blanc or Beaujolais-Villages Blanc. The vineyards to produces these wines are normally found in the limestone soils of the far northern extremities of the region. Part of the reason for the small production of these wines is that many of the vineyards overlap into the Mâconnais regions and producers will usually choose to label their wines under the more marketable and well known Mâcon Blanc designation. There is also regulations in several Beaujolais communes restricting growers to dedicating no more than 10% of their vineyard space to white wine grape varieties. Beaujolais Rosé made from Gamay is permitted in the Beaujolais AOC but is rarely produced.

=== Beaujolais crus ===
The 10 Beaujolais crus differ in character. The following three crus produce the lightest-bodied Beaujolais and are typically intended to be consumed within three years of the vintage.

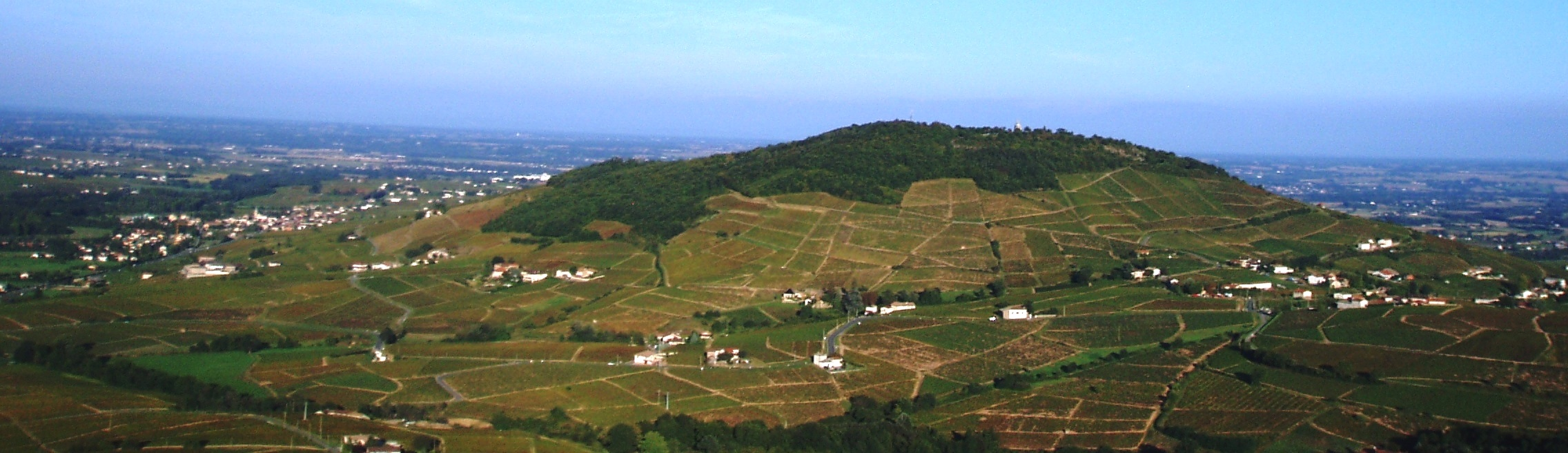
Mont Brouilly at centre, encircled by vineyards

- Brouilly – The largest cru in Beaujolais, situated around Mont Brouilly and containing within its boundaries the sub-district of Côte de Brouilly. The wines are noted for their aromas of blueberries, cherries, raspberries and currants. Along with Côte de Brouilly, this is the only Cru Beaujolais region that permits grapes other than Gamay to be produced in the area with vineyards growing Chardonnay, Aligote and Melon de Bourgogne as well. The Brouilly cru also contains the famous Pisse Vieille vineyard (roughly translated as "piss old woman!") which received its name from a local legend of a devout Catholic woman who misheard the local priest's absolution to "Allez! Et ne péchez plus." (Go! And sin no more.) as "Allez! Et ne pissez plus." (Go! And piss no more). The vineyard name is the admonishment that her husband gave to her upon learning of the priest's words.
- Régnié - The most recently recognized cru, graduating from a Beaujolais-Villages area to Cru Beaujolais in 1988. One of the more full-bodied crus in this category. It is noted for its redcurrant and raspberry flavors. Local lore in the region states that this cru was the site of the first vineyards planted in Beaujolais by the Romans.
- Chiroubles – This cru has vineyards at some of the highest altitudes among the Cru Beaujolais. Chiroubles cru are noted for their delicate perfume that often includes aromas of violets.

The next three crus produce more medium bodied Cru Beaujolais that Master of Wine Mary Ewing-Mulligan recommends needs at least a year aging in the bottle and to be consumed within four years of the vintage.

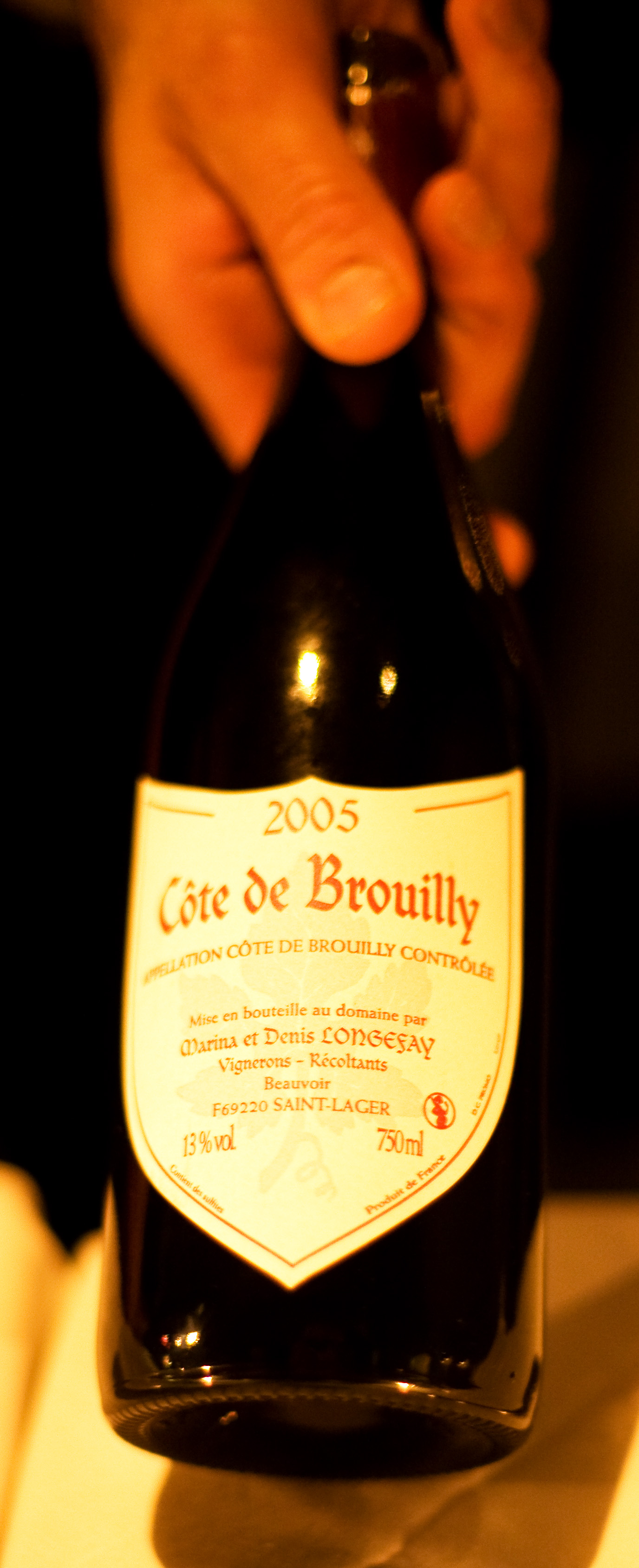
Bottle of Côte de Brouilly wine.

- Côte de Brouilly – Located on the higher slopes of the extinct volcano Mont Brouilly within the Brouilly Cru Beaujolais. The wines from this region are more deeply concentrated with less earthiness than Brouilly wine.
- Fleurie – One of the most widely exported Cru Beaujolais into the United States. These wines often have a velvet texture with fruity and floral bouquet. In ideal vintages, a vin de garde (wine for aging) is produced that is meant to age at least four years before consuming and can last up to 16 years.
- Saint-Amour – Local lore suggest that this region was named after a Roman soldier (St. Amateur) who converted to Christianity after escaping death and established a mission near the area. The wines from Saint-Amour are noted for their spicy flavors with aromas of peaches. The vin de garde wines require at least four year aging and can last up to 12 years.

The last four crus produce the fullest bodied examples of Cru Beaujolais that need the most time ageing in the bottle and are usually meant to be consumed between four and 10 years after harvest.

- Chénas – Once contained many of the vineyards that are now sold under the Moulin-à-Vent designation. It is now the smallest Cru Beaujolais with wines that are noted for their aroma of wild roses. In ideal vintages, a vin de garde is produced that is meant to age at least five years before consuming and last up to 15. The area named is derived from the forest of French oak trees (chêne) that used to dot the hillside.
- Juliénas – This cru is centered on the village named after Julius Caesar. The wines made from this area are noted for their richness and spice with aromas reminiscent of peonies. In contrast to the claims of Régnié, Juliénas growers believe that this area was the site of the first vineyards planted in Beaujolais by the Romans during their conquest of Gaul.
- Morgon – Produces earthy wines that can take on a Burgundian character of silky texture after five years aging. These wines are generally the deepest color and most rich Cru Beaujolais with aromas of apricots and peaches. Within this cru there is a particular hillside, known as Côte du Py, in the center of Morgon that produces the most powerful examples of Morgon wines.
- Moulin-à-Vent – Wines are very similar to the nearby Chénas Cru Beaujolais. This region produces some of the longest-lasting examples of Beaujolais wine, with some wines lasting up to 10 years. Some producers will age their Moulin-à-Vent in oak which gives these wines more tannin and structure than other Beaujolais wines. The phrase fûts de chêne (oak casks) will sometimes appear on the wine label of these oak aged wines. The region is noted for the high level of manganese that is in the soil, which can be toxic to grape vines in high levels. The level of toxicity in Moulin-à-Vent does not kill the vine but is enough to cause chlorosis and alter the vine's metabolism to reduce yields severely. The resulting wines from Moulin-à-Vent are the most full bodied and powerful examples in Beaujolais. The vin de garde styles require at least six years aging and can last up to 20 years.

=== Beaujolais nouveau ===
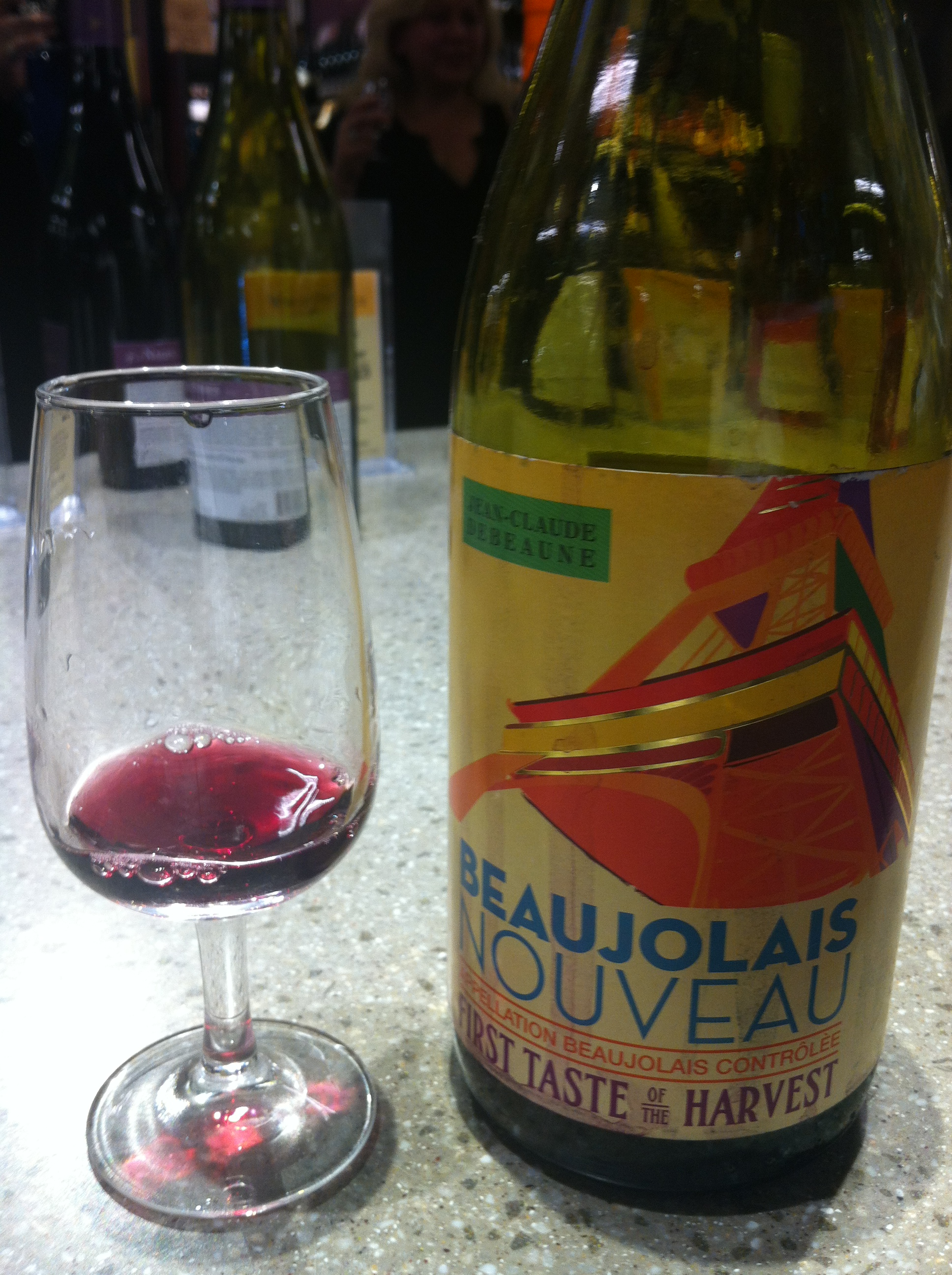
A glass and bottle of Beaujolais nouveau from the 2013 vintage

Beaujolais nouveau traces its roots to 19th century when the first wines of the vintage were sent down the Saône to the bistros of Lyon. Upon their arrival, signs would be put out proclaiming "Le Beaujolais Est Arrivé!", celebrating another successful harvest. In the 1960s, this style of simple Beaujolais became increasingly popular worldwide, with more than half a million cases of it being sold. In 1985 the Institut National des Appellations d'Origine (INAO) established the third Thursday of November to allow for a uniform release date for the wine. Wines are typically shipped a few days earlier to locations around the world where they must be held in a bonded warehouse till 12:01 am, when the wines can be first opened and consumed.

Today, about a third of the region's production is sold as Beaujolais nouveau, a marketing name created by Georges Duboeuf for the local vin de l'année. It is the lightest, fruitiest style of Beaujolais and meant for simple quaffing. Any Beaujolais or Beaujolais-Villages AOC vineyard can produce Beaujolais nouveau. The grapes are harvested between late August and early September. It is fermented for just a few days and released to the public on the third Thursday of November – "Beaujolais Nouveau Day". It is the first French wine to be released for each vintage year. In 1992, at its peak, more than half of all Beaujolais wine was sold as "Beaujolais nouveau". The wines are meant to be drunk as young as possible, when they are at their freshest and fruitiest. They can last up to one or two years but will have lost most of their characteristic flavours by that point.

== Viticulture and grape varieties ==
The Beaujolais region has one of the highest vine density ratios of any major worldwide wine region, with anywhere from 9000 to 13,000 vines per hectare. Most vines are trained in the traditional gobelet style, where the spurs of the vines are pushed upwards and arranged in a circle, resembling a chalice. This method has its roots in the Roman style of vine training and has only recently begun to fall out of favor for the guyot method which involves taking a single or double spur and training it out horizontally. Harvest usually occurs in late September and is almost universally done by hand rather than with the use of mechanical harvesters. This is because the Beaujolais wine-making style of carbonic maceration utilizes whole bunches of grape clusters that normally get broken and separated by a mechanical harvester.

The Gamay grape, more accurately known as Gamay noir à Jus blanc to distinguish it from the Gamay teinturier grapes with red juice and different from the Napa Gamay and the Gamay Beaujolais grapes of California, is the most widely planted grape in Beaujolais, accounting for nearly 98% of all plantings. The remaining plantings are mostly Chardonnay. Aligote vines that were planted prior to 2004 are permitted in wine production, but the entire grape variety is being phased out of the region by 2024. According to AOC regulation, up to 15% of white wine grape varieties can be included in all Beaujolais red wines from the basic Beaujolais AOC to the Cru Beaujolais wines, but in practice the wines are almost always 100% Gamay. Pinot noir, which has very small plantings, is also permitted, but that grape is being phased out by 2015 as Beaujolais winemakers continue to focus their winemaking identity on the Gamay grape. The characteristics that the Gamay grapes adds to Beaujolais are a deep bluish-red color, high acidity, moderate tannins, and light to medium body. The aroma associated with the grape itself is typically red berries.

Since the 1960s, more focus has been placed on the choice of rootstocks and clonal selection, with six approved clones of Gamay for the wine region. In recent years the rootstock Vialla has gained popularity due to its propensity to produce well in granite soils. The SO4 and 3309 rootstocks also account for significant plantings. Clonal selection of the Gamay grape has shifted towards an emphasis on smaller, thicker-skinned berries.

== Winemaking and style ==
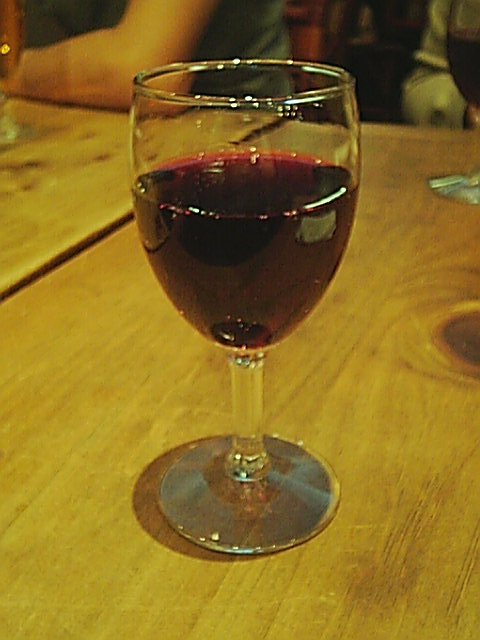
Beaujolais nouveau

Beaujolais wines are produced by the winemaking technique of semi-carbonic maceration. Whole grape clusters are put in cement or stainless steel tanks with capacities between 4,000–30,000 litres (1,100–7,900 US gal). The bottom third of the grapes gets crushed under the weight of gravity and resulting must begins normal yeast fermentation with ambient yeasts found naturally on the skins of the grapes. Carbon dioxide is released as a byproduct of this fermentation and begins to saturate the individual intact grape berries that remain in the barrel. The carbon dioxide seeps into the skin of the grape and begin to stimulate fermentation at an intracellular level. This is caused, in part, by the absence of oxygen in the winemaking environment. This results in a fruity wine without much tannin. In the case of Beaujolais nouveau, this process is completed in as little as four days, with the other AOCs being allowed longer time to ferment. As the grapes ferment longer, they develop more tannins and a fuller body. Maximum length of the cuvaison for Nouveau wines is limited to 10 days.

After fermentation, the must is normally high in malic acid and producers will put the wine through malolactic fermentation to soften the wine. The process of chaptalization, adding sugar to the grape must to boost alcohol levels, has been a controversial issue for Beaujolais winemakers. Historically, Beaujolais producers would pick grapes at ripeness that were at minimum potential alcohol levels of 10–10.5% and then add sugar in order to artificially boost the alcohol levels to the near the maximum of 13–13.5%. This created wines lacking structure and balance to go with the high alcohol body and mouthfeel. The recent trend towards higher quality wine production has limited the use of chaptalization in the premium levels of Beaujolais wine. Filtering the wine in order to stabilize it is practiced to varying degrees by Beaujolais winemakers. Some producers who make Beaujolais on a large commercial scale will filter the wine aggressively to avoid any impurity or future chemical reactions. This can have the negative side effect of diminishing some of the wine's unique fruit character and leave a flavor that critics have described as Jell-O-like.

Basic Beaujolais is the classic bistro wine of Paris; a fruity, easy-drinking red traditionally served in 1 pint glass bottles known as pots. This is epitomized in Beaujolais nouveau, which is fermented for just a few days and can be dominated by estery flavors such as bananas and pear drops. Basic Beaujolais and Beaujolais nouveau are meant to be drunk within a year of their harvest. Beaujolais-Villages are generally consumed within two to three years and Cru Beaujolais has the potential to age longer, some not even fully developing till at least three years after harvest. Wine from Chénas, Juliénas, Morgon and Moulin-à-Vent can spend up to 10 years continuing to develop in the bottle and vintages can take on Burgundian qualities of structure and complexity.

== Wine industry ==
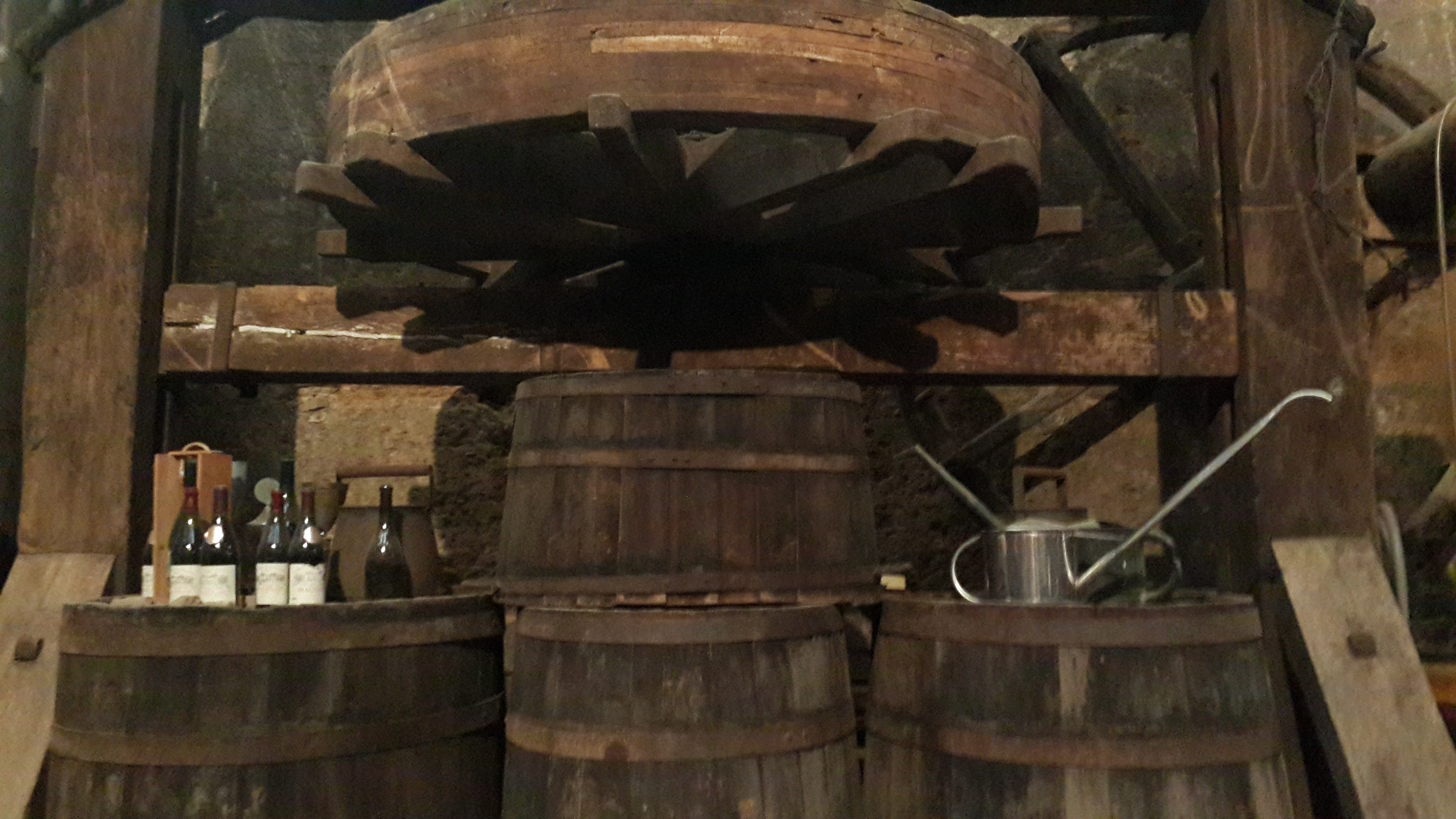
Wine yard in Beaujolais

The Beaujolais wine industry is dominated by the more than 30 négociants who produce nearly 90% of the wine sold outside the Beaujolais region. Many of these négociants, such as Maison Louis Jadot (which owns Moulin-à-Vent-based Château des Jacques) and Bouchard Père et Fils, are based in Burgundy. One of the most well known Beaujolais producers is the négociant Georges Duboeuf. There are more than 4000 vineyard owners in Beaujolais and the fractional amount that is not sold to négociants are bottled by the nearly 20 village co-operatives with a growing amount being estate bottled. Very little of the estate bottled Beaujolais wines are exported into the United States or United Kingdom though a few exporters specialize in this small niche—the most notable being Kermit Lynch and Alain Jugenet.

== Serving and food pairing ==
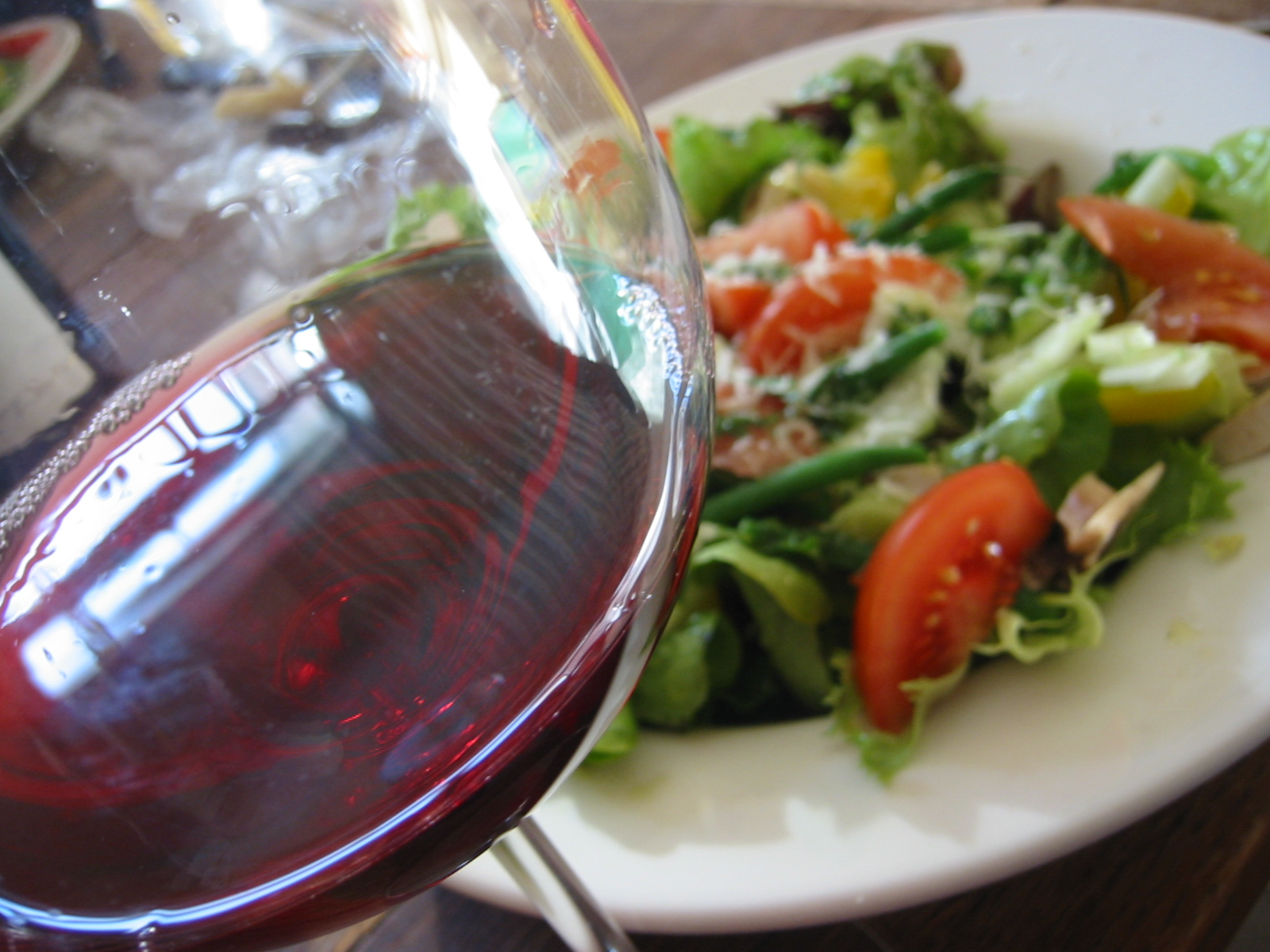
Light bodied Beaujolais wine, such as Beaujolais-Villages pair well with lighter fare like salads.

Wine expert Karen MacNeil has described Beaujolais as "the only white wine that happens to be red". Similarly, Beaujolais is often treated like a white wine and served slightly chilled to a lower temperature, the lighter the style. Beaujolais nouveau, being the lightest style, is served at about 52 °F (11 °C). Beaujolais AOC and Beaujolais-Villages are generally served between 56–57 °F (13–14 °C). Cru Beaujolais, especially the fuller bodied examples, can be treated like red Burgundy wine and served at 60–62 °F (16–17 °C). The wines rarely need to be decanted. In Beaujolais, it is traditional to soak the bottles in buckets of ice water and bring them out to the village's center for picnics and games of boules.

Beaujolais wine can be paired with a variety of food according to the lightness and body of the wine. Beaujolais Nouveau is typically used as an apéritif with basic Beaujolais and Beaujolais-Villages doing well with light fare, like picnics and salads. The lighter Cru Beaujolais pair well with poultry and the heavier Crus pairing better with red meats and hearty dishes like stews. In Norway, Beaujolais is a favorite with cod and bacalhau dishes. According to Lyon chef Paul Bocuse, Beaujolais wine is used to make a traditional regional dessert involving a glass of sliced peaches, topped with blackcurrants and drenched in chilled Beaujolais wine.

== See also ==
- List of vins de primeur
