= Alta Mesa AVA =

American Viticultural Area in Sacramento County, California

Coordinates: 38°26′59″N 121°17′52″W

Alta Mesa
- Wine region
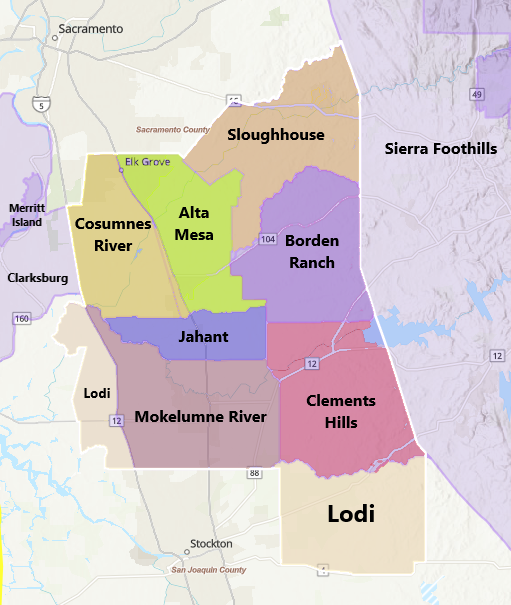
- Type: American Viticultural Area
- Year established: 2006
- Country: United States
- Part of: California, Central Valley, Sacramento County, Lodi AVA
- Other regions in California, Central Valley, Sacramento County, Lodi AVA: Borden Ranch AVA, Cosumnes River AVA, Sloughhouse AVA, Jahant AVA
- Growing season: 318 days
- Climate region: Region III-V
- Heat units: 3,125–4,481 GDD units
- Precipitation (annual average): 18.5 inches (470 mm)
- Soil conditions: San Joaquin soil with dense, heavy clay and gravel
- Total area: 55,400 acres (87 sq mi)
- Size of planted vineyards: 5,000 acres (2,000 ha)
- Grapes produced: Cabernet Sauvignon, Cabernet Franc, Merlot, Syrah, Zinfandel, Verdelho, Vermentino, Albariño/Alvarinho, Grenache blanc, Moscato Giallo, Torrontés, Tannat, Touriga Nacional, Touriga Francesa, Tinta Roriz/Tempranillo, Tinta Cão, Souzão, Alvarelhão and Tinta Amarela

Alta Mesa is an American Viticultural Area (AVA) located solely in Sacramento County, California and the north-central portion of the established Lodi viticultural area. Alta Mesa, from its center point, is 21 miles (34 km) south of downtown Sacramento and 13 miles (21 km) north from downtown Lodi. It was established as the nation's 174^{th}, the state's 98^{th} and the county's third appellation on July 17, 2006 by the Alcohol and Tobacco Tax and Trade Bureau (TTB), Treasury on July 17, 2006 after reviewing the petition submitted by Lodi American Viticultural Areas (LAVA) Steering Committee proposing a viticultural area in Sacramento County known as "Alta Mesa."

The LAVA Steering Committee actually petitioned TTB in 2003 for seven new viticultural areas within the boundaries of the existing Lodi viticultural area in southern Sacramento and northern San Joaquin Counties. The seven LAVA Steering Committee petitions proposed the creation of the Alta Mesa, Borden Ranch, Clements Hills, Cosumnes River, Jahant, Mokelumne River and Sloughhouse viticultural areas. The sixteen wine industry members that comprise the committee stated that their proposal subdivides the existing Lodi area into "seven smaller viticultural areas of distinction." The establishment of the seven viticultural areas did not in any way affect the 551,500-acre (861.7 sq mi) Lodi AVA which continues as a single American viticultural area within its current boundary. However, the TTB ruled that the seven proposed areas fall entirely within the 1986 original 458,000-acre (716 sq mi) boundaries and thus, as proposed, would not include any of the 93,500 acres (146.1 sq mi) added to Lodi AVA when it was expanded along its western and southern borders in 2002.

Alta Mesa encompasses 55,400 acres (87 sq mi) with approximately 5,000 acres (2,000 ha) under vine according to the petition. The irregularly shaped, five-sided area is 13.3-mile-long (21.4 km) north to south, and 8.3-mile-wide (13.4 km) at its widest point east to west. The Alta Mesa "tabletop" landform and the extent of the Joaquin soil series generally outline the boundary of the viticultural area. Initial plantings were standard red wine varieties of Cabernet Sauvignon, Merlot, Malbec, Syrah, Cabernet Franc and Zinfandel, then later diversified to include alternative varieties as Verdelho, Vermentino, Albariño/Alvarinho, Grenache blanc, Moscato Giallo, Torrontés, Tannat, and black skinned Port grapes such as Touriga Nacional, Touriga Francesa, Tinta Roriz/Tempranillo, Tinta Cão, Souzão, Alvarelhão and Tinta Amarela.

== Name Evidence ==
The name "Alta Mesa", (/æltə ˈmeɪsə/ AL-tuh-MAY-suh) means "high table" in Spanish, reflecting California's history under Spanish-controlled Mexico as "Alta California". The local ranchers, farmers, and winemakers refer to this region within the existing Lodi viticultural area as "Alta Mesa", and notes that the name is also used for places within the viticultural area. The Alta Mesa Farm Bureau Hall, which is listed on the National Register of Historic Places, is on Alta Mesa Road, while the Alta Mesa Fair is held annually in Elk Grove and the Alta Mesa Dairy is in Wilton both of which are within the area's boundary. The name "Alta Mesa" also appears four times on the USGS Sloughhouse map within the viticultural area's boundaries. The map shows the 138-foot-high (42 m) Alta Mesa benchmark. Alta Mesa Road runs along the northern and eastern boundaries of section 5, T6N, R7E, and continues onto the USGS Clay, California map. The road serves as part of the Alta Mesa viticultural area's eastern boundary.

== Terroir ==
=== Topography ===
Alta Mesa viticultural area "tabletop" or mesa-like landform is one of the area's most distinctive and unifying features where the American and Cosumnes Rivers built up intermediate elevation river terraces and alluvial fans forming these features. The elevation gently rises from approximately 35 feet (11 m) in the west to 138 feet (42 m) in the east at the Alta Mesa benchmark. Alta Mesa generally has a flat surface despite some depressions and mounds. To the east of the area, the Sierra Range foothills begin to rise within the Sloughhouse viticultural area. To the Alta Mesa's immediate west, the Cosumnes River viticultural area has lower elevations that almost dip to mean sea level. Deer Creek and the lower course of the Cosumnes River run parallel and southwest through the area.

=== Climate ===
The petition uses data from the Lodi, Sacramento, Folsom and Camp Pardee weather stations, which are located close to the Alta Mesa viticultural area. With a mean annual temperature of 60.5 °F (15.8 °C), the petition states that the Alta Mesa area is a transitional region that is warmer than most of the other viticultural areas within the existing Lodi viticultural area. Only the Clements Hills area, which has the same annual mean temperature as the Alta Mesa area, and the more inland Sloughhouse area, are warmer. The warm climate of the Alta Mesa viticultural area is seen in the area's heat accumulation as measured in degree days. The degree day total for the Alta Mesa area is more than 200 degree days higher than the totals of the Jahant and Mokelumne River viticultural areas to the south, which are closer to the cooling breezes of the Sacramento Delta. The degree day total for the Alta Mesa area is also more than 100 degree days higher than the totals of the Cosumnes River area to its west and the Borden Ranch and Clements Hills viticultural areas to its east and southeast. The sea breeze from the Pacific Ocean that funnels through the Carquinez Strait and the Sacramento Delta, the petition explains, cools the overall Lodi area. However, this natural air conditioning gradually decreases in intensity and disperses as it flows inland from west to east. As measured across the northern portion of the existing Lodi viticultural area from west to east, these marine winds are strongest in the Cosumnes River viticultural area, less intense in the proposed Alta Mesa area, and weakest in the Sloughhouse area.
Winter fog is also common in the Alta Mesa viticultural area due to seasonal standing water and cold-air drainage from the foothills to the east. This fog slightly decreases the Alta Mesa area's degree-day total, according to the petition, by limiting the springtime heating of the soil and vines. In addition, the petition notes, the Alta Mesa viticultural area's elevation provides a buffer between this fog from the west and the Sloughhouse viticultural area to the east. The average annual rain total in the Alta Mesa viticultural area is 18.5 in (470 mm). This amount is less than the 23 in (580 mm) annual average in Sloughhouse to the east and more than the rainfall averages found in the regions to Alta Mesa's immediate south. The USDA plant hardiness zone is 9b.

=== Soil ===
The San Joaquin soil series, which covers about 90 percent of the Alta Mesa region, is also a distinctive feature of the viticultural area. This soil series consists of dense, heavy clay that limits rooting depth and the need for irrigation. Classified as Abruptic Durixeralfs, the San Joaquin soils have high percentages of clay and gravel, and intensive reddening and cementation caused by silica, clay, and iron. This soil series has intermediate-age parent materials, 12,000 to 45,000 years old, from stage 2 of the late Pleistocene glacial age, making these some of the oldest soils within the established Lodi viticultural area, according to the petition. The Storie index places the Alta Mesa soils between 25 and 40 points of suitability. The San Joaquin soil series, the petition emphasizes, creates a distinctive and beneficial viticultural environment in the Alta Mesa viticultural area.
