= Madiran (disambiguation) =

Madiran may refer to:

- Madiran, a commune in the Hautes-Pyrénées department in south-western France
- Madiran wine, wine produced around the village of Madiran in Gascony
- Jean Madiran, or Jean Arfel (1920–2013), French nationalist and a traditionalist Catholic writer, worked under the pen name Jean Madiran
