= Bouchalès =

Varietal

Bouchalès or Grapput is a red French wine grape variety that is grown primarily in Bordeaux and Southwest France wine appellations. Plantings have declined in recent years as the vine has shown high sensitivity to downy mildew and black rot.

Old vine plantings of Bouchalès that more than a 100 years exist at Château de la Vieille-Chapelle in the Fronsac AOC located just northwest of the city of Libourne in the "Right Bank" region of Bordeaux. These vines are believed to be some of the oldest vines in Bordeaux (where only 27% of the vines average more than 30 years age), having likely survived the phylloxera epidemic of the late 19th century due to the ancient Libournais practice of flooding the vineyards in winter which would disrupt the nymph stage in the life cycle of phylloxera.

== History and origins ==
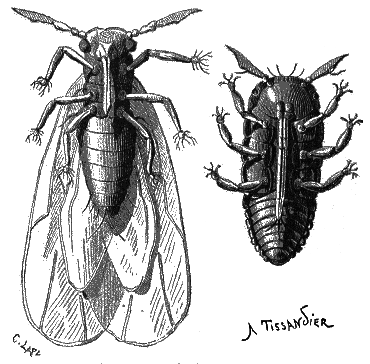
The ancient Libournais tradition of flooding the vineyards in winter may have helped century-plus old vines of Bouchalès survive the phylloxera epidemic, due to the flood waters disrupting the nymph stage (pictured right) in the life cycle of the phylloxera louse.

French ampelographer Guy Lavignac has theorized that the name Bouchalès comes from the Occitan word boish meaning "box tree" and could refer to the way that the Bouchalès vine in full foliage resembles a box shape. However, Master of Wine Jancis Robinson notes that many Vitis vinifera grapevines resemble boxes, and since Bouchalès is a common surname in the Lot-et-Garonne region, it is likely that the grape took on the name of one of its propagators.

In the Dordogne region, Bouchalès is also known as Bouissalet; this has led some ampelographers to believe that the grape could be a dark color mutation of the white wine grape Arrufiac which is known as Bouissalet in the Pacherenc du Vic-Bilh region, but DNA testing has ruled out a connection between the two varieties.

Documents from 1783-1784 described Bouchalès being widely planted throughout southwest France (the Sud-ouest), particularly in the Lot-et-Garonne, Gers, and Dordogne departments. Vineyards in Agen, Auch, Estillac, Saint-Barthélemy-de-Bellegarde, and Tonneins were particularly noted for Bouchalès growing well there and producing deeply colored "black wine" of good quality.

Like many Vitis vinifera varieties, plantings of Bouchalès were decimated during the phylloxera epidemic of the late 19th century. The fact that Bouchalès experienced difficulties in taking the grafting of American rootstock (like Vitis riparia and Vitis rupestris) also contributed to its decline. However, in 2009 a Libournais vineyard belonging to Château de la Vieille Chapelle was discovered to contain ungrafted Bouchalès vines over 100 years old. Wine expert Jancis Robinson and others have speculated that these vines survived the phylloxera epidemic due to the frequent winter flood irrigation of the vineyards that was a tradition of Libournais viticulture for many centuries. This flooding with waters from the nearby river Dordogne would disrupt the life cycle of the phylloxera louse by inhibiting its growth during its nymph stage.

== Viticulture ==
Bouchalès is a productive vine that can create full foliage and high yields if not severely pruned. It has a tendency to bud early and ripen mid-season. The main viticultural hazards for Bouchalès, beyond its difficulty to take to grafted rootstocks, is its susceptibility to black rot.

== Wine regions ==
Southwest France where the Bouchalès grape is found. Most of the plantings today are along the Garonne river.

Scattered plantings of Bouchalès can be found throughout southwest France with the majority found following the path of the Garonne river. In 1958 there were 12,355 acres (5,000 hectare) but by 2008 that figure had dipped to only 272 acres (110 hectares).

== Confusion with other grape varieties ==
Over the years Bouchalès has often been confused with other grapevines due to either similarity in appearance or synonyms. This includes the Mérille grape of the Garonne that is also grown in the Ariège department where historic plantings of Bouchalès once were. Also in the Garone it has been confused for Côt, the local name for the ancient Bordeaux variety Malbec.

== Synonyms ==
Over the years Bouchalès has been known under a variety of synonyms including: Aubet, Bouchalès Chedy, Bouchalets (in Lot-et-Garonne), Boucharès, Bouchedey, Boucherès (in Dordogne), Bouissalet (in Dordogne), Bouscalès, Bouscarès, Bouyssalet, Capbreton Rouge, Cayla, Crapput, Craput, Cujas, Esparbasque, Grappu, Grapput (in Gironde), Gros de Judith, Gros grappu, Gros Marthy, Gros Marty, Gros maure, Gros Mol, Jeanjean, Négrasse, Picardan, Picardan noir, Piquardan, Plant Touzau, Prolongeau, Prueras, Prueyras, Queuefort, Sensit Rouge, Toussan and Touzan.
