= Clements Hills AVA =

American Viticultural Area in San Joaquin County, California

Coordinates: 38°02′05″N 121°01′50″W

Clements Hills
- Wine region
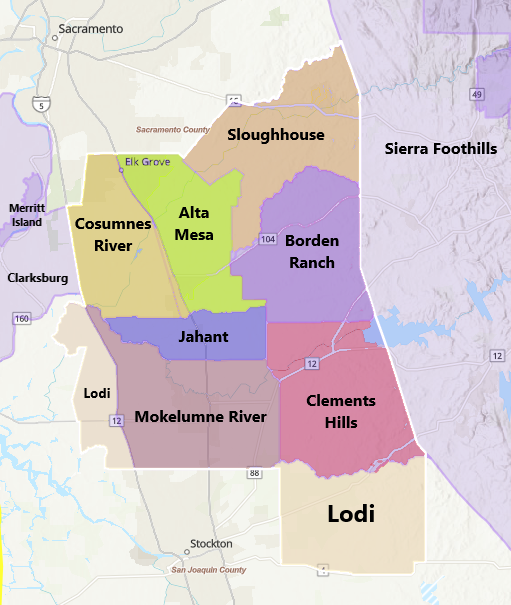
- Type: American Viticultural Area
- Year established: 2006
- Country: United States
- Part of: California, Central Valley, San Joaquin County, Lodi AVA
- Other regions in California, Central Valley, San Joaquin County, Lodi AVA: Borden Ranch AVA, Cosumnes River AVA, Jahant AVA, Mokelumne River AVA
- Growing season: 303 days
- Climate region: Region II-V
- Heat units: 2,620–4,211 GDD units
- Precipitation (annual average): 21–22 inches (530–560 mm)
- Soil conditions: Alluvial top soil composed of loams, clay loams, clays overlaying areas of granite and volcanic soils
- Total area: 85,400 acres (133 sq mi)
- Size of planted vineyards: 21,700 acres (8,782 ha)
- No. of vineyards: 2
- Grapes produced: Albariño, Barbera, Cabernet Sauvignon, Chardonnay, Dolcetto, Graciano, Grenache, Malbec, Merlot, Mourvedre, Petite Sirah, Sangiovese, Syrah/Shiraz, Tempranillo, Zinfandel
- No. of wineries: 7

Clements Hills is an American Viticultural Area (AVA) located in northern San Joaquin County, California within the southeastern portion of the vast Lodi appellation. Clements Hills, centered around the town of Clements, lies approximately 41 miles (66 km) southeast of Sacramento and 13 miles (21 km) east of the city of Lodi. It was established as the nation's 176th, the state's 100th and the county's fourth appellation on July 17, 2006 by the Alcohol and Tobacco Tax and Trade Bureau (TTB), Treasury after reviewing the petition submitted by the Lodi American Viticultural Areas (LAVA) Steering Committee proposing a viticultural area in San Joaquin County known as "Clements Hills."

The LAVA Steering Committee actually petitioned TTB in 2003 for seven new viticultural areas within the boundaries of the existing Lodi viticultural area in southern Sacramento and northern San Joaquin Counties. The seven LAVA Steering Committee petitions proposed the creation of the Alta Mesa, Borden Ranch, Clements Hills, Cosumnes River, Jahant, Mokelumne River, and Sloughhouse viticultural areas. The sixteen wine industry members that comprise the committee stated that their proposal subdivides the existing Lodi area into "seven smaller viticultural areas of distinction." The establishment of the seven viticultural areas did not in any way affect the 551,500-acre (862 sq mi) Lodi AVA which continues as a single American viticultural area within its current boundary. However, the TTB ruled that the seven proposed areas fall entirely within the 1986 original 458,000-acre (716 sq mi) boundaries and thus, as proposed, would not include any of the 93,500 acres (146 sq mi) added to Lodi AVA when it was expanded along its western and southern borders in 2002.

Clements Hills viticultural area encompasses 85,400 acres (133 sq mi) with approximately 21,700 acres (8,782 ha) under vine. Clements Hills is a hilly transitional region between the low, flat San Joaquin Valley floor to the west and the progressively higher Sierra Foothills to the east. The area's high elevation river terraces and rounded hilltops distinguish it from surrounding grape-growing regions. The Mokelumne River flows through the viticultural area composed of rolling hills with elevations between 90 and 400 feet (27–122 m). A variety of microclimates are within the hills of the region. The soils are composed of loams, clay loams, and clays with an alluvial top soil lying upon a bedrock base of granite and volcanic soils. The warm climate and poor-quality soils are well suited to the production of wines made from Spanish grape varieties such as Tempranillo, Grenache and Albariño. While these Spanish varieties thrive, there are also plantings of Zinfandel, Syrah and Viognier.

== Name Evidence ==
The small town of Clements is located in the northern portion of Clements Hills viticultural area and is shown on the USGS Clements map and on California highway maps. According to the petition, Thomas Clements, who had settled in the region in 1857, donated 25 acres (10 ha) of land in 1882 to develop the town as a stop on the San Joaquin and Sierra Nevada Railroad. Named for its benefactor, the town served as a shipping point for the region's grain, wool, hops, fruit, and other agricultural commodities. The "Clements Hills" viticultural area name combines the town's name with a reference to the area's hilly terrain. Local residents, realtors, and members of the wine industry, the petition states, commonly use the Clements Hills name to refer to the land within the area's boundaries. For example, realtor Tad Platt states that while marketing materials formerly referred to the "rolling hills of Clement," the area has become better known simply as "Clements Hills" in recent years. Farmer Wesley Breitchenbucher and businessman Jeff Myers, whose families have lived in the Clements area for generations, also indicate that the area is known as Clements Hills, according to the petition. The petition quotes Mr. Myers as stating that "the red, shallow soils of the Clements Hills" has attracted many vineyards and ranchette developments in the past decade. In addition, the petition notes the use of the Clements Hills name on the label of Vino Con Brio's 2001 Sangiovese wine.

== Terroir ==
=== Topography ===
Clements Hills viticultural area is located between the flat, low elevations of the San Joaquin Valley floor to its west and the higher Sierra Foothills elevations to its east, according to the petition. Elevations within the boundary area increase from a low of 90 feet (27 m) on its western, San Joaquin Valley side to greater than 400 feet (120 m) high at its eastern boundary line, according to the provided USGS maps. The petition also notes that the hilltops within the Clements Hills viticultural area are distinctively convex and rounded. The Clements Hills, the petition states, contrast with the flat valley terrain to the west, the flat hilltops of the Borden Ranch viticultural area to the north, and the more mountainous environment of the Sierras. Through time and weather, the petition adds, the bluffs and terraces of the Mokelumne River have become smooth topped, rolling hills that extend toward the Clements Hills area's southern boundary at the Calaveras River.

=== Climate ===
Using data from the Lodi, Sacramento, Folsom, Stockton and Camp Pardee weather stations, which are located close to the Clements Hills viticultural area, the petition states that the Clements Hills area is warmer and wetter than the regions to its west. As documented in the petition, the mean annual temperature of the Clements Hills is 60.5 °F (15.8 °C), which is the same as the Alta Mesa area's mean annual temperature. Also, only the Sloughhouse viticultural area, north of the Clements Hills region, experiences a warmer annual mean temperature in the Lodi area. The Clements Hills area annual degree day total is approximately 100 °F (38 °C) higher than those of the Mokelumne River and Jahant viticultural areas to the west. The petition notes that fog is less frequent in the Clements Hills viticultural area than in the lower elevation San Joaquin valley floor areas to its west and, therefore, the proposed area receives more hours of warming sunshine. Reduced winds also help warm the Clements Hills area, according the petition. Although the area receives consistent Sacramento Delta breezes, the hilly terrain of the Clements Hills area reduces the marine wind speed and movement across the proposed area. Air drainage from the higher slopes to the east reduces frost occurrences in the viticultural area as well.
Rainfall in the Clements Hills viticultural area averages 21 to 22 inches (530–560 mm) annually which is more than what the lower elevation Jahant and Mokelumne River areas to its west and the Borden Ranch area to its north receive. Clements Hills area's hilly topography and its location just west of the Sierra Mountains bring more rain to the area since these higher elevations cause moisture-laden Pacific air to rise, forcing the air's moisture to condense and fall to the ground. The plant hardiness zone is 9b.

=== Soils ===
The soils found within the Clements Hills viticultural area are old and primarily classified as Haploxerailfs, Durixeralfs, and Palexeralfs. These brown, red and yellow loams, clay loams, and clays principally belong to the Redding, Cometa, Yellowlark, and Montpellier soil series. Also, these low vigor soils have higher water holding capacities than the stony soils to the north in the Borden Ranch viticultural area, but less than the loamy soils to the west in the Mokelumne River area. The Storie Index rates the soils in the Clements Hills viticultural area at between 15 and 30.
