= Storie =

Storie may refer to

- Storie (surname)
- Storie index, a method of soil rating
- Tutte storie, an album by Italian singer Eros Ramazzotti
