= Jahant AVA =

American Viticultural Area in San Joaquin County, California

Coordinates: 37°42′17″N 121°24′15″W

Jahant
- Wine region
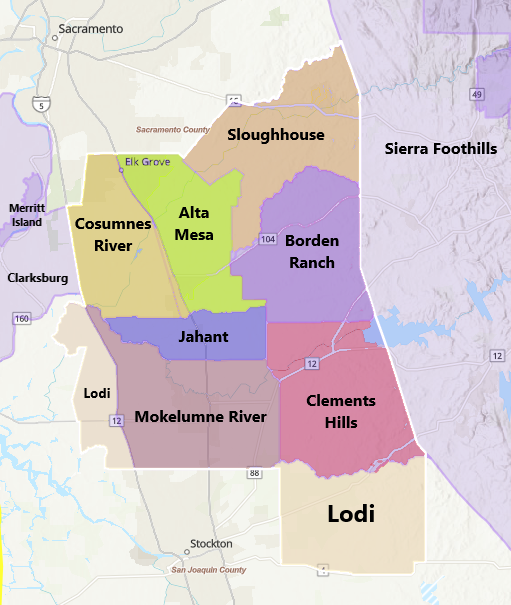
- Type: American Viticultural Area
- Year established: 2006
- Years of wine industry: 36
- Country: United States
- Part of: California, Central Valley, San Joaquin County. Sacramento County. Lodi AVA
- Other regions in California, Central Valley, San Joaquin County. Sacramento County. Lodi AVA: Alta Mesa AVA, Borden Ranch AVA, Clements Hills AVA, Cosumnes River AVA, Mokelumne River AVA, Sloughhouse AVA
- Growing season: 277 days
- Climate region: Region III-V
- Heat units: 3,125–4,481 GDD units
- Precipitation (annual average): 11 inches (280 mm)
- Soil conditions: Rocklin-Jahant sandy and sandy clay loams
- Total area: 28,000 acres (44 sq mi)
- Size of planted vineyards: 9,000 acres (3,642 ha)
- Grapes produced: Chardonnay, Petite Sirah, Tempranillo, Valdepenas, Zinfandel
- No. of wineries: 5

Jahant is an American Viticultural Area (AVA) located primarily in San Joaquin County, California with a minor portion in Sacramento County. It lies in the center of the existing Lodi viticultural area about 29 miles (47 km) south of the city of Sacramento and seven miles (11 km) north of the city of Lodi. It was established as the nation's 179th, the state's 102nd and San Joaquin County's fifth appellation on July 17, 2006 by the Alcohol and Tobacco Tax and Trade Bureau (TTB), Treasury after reviewing the petition submitted by Lodi American Viticultural Areas (LAVA) Steering Committee proposing a viticultural area in San Joaquin County known as "Jahant."

The Lodi American Viticultural Areas (LAVA) Steering Committee actually petitioned TTB in 2003 for seven new viticultural areas within the boundary of the existing Lodi viticultural in southern Sacramento and northern San Joaquin Counties. The seven LAVA Steering Committee petitions proposed the creation of the Alta Mesa, Borden Ranch, Clements Hills, Cosumnes River, Jahant, Mokelumne River, and Sloughhouse viticultural areas. The sixteen wine industry members that comprise the committee stated that their proposal subdivides the existing Lodi area into "seven smaller viticultural areas of distinction." The establishment of the seven viticultural areas did not in any way affect the 551,500-acre (862 sq mi) Lodi viticultural area. The Lodi area continues as a single American viticultural area within its current boundary, however, the TTB ruled that the seven proposed areas fall entirely within the 458,000 acres (716 sq mi) original 1986 boundary of the Lodi viticultural area and thus, as proposed, would not include any of the 93,500 acres (146 sq mi) added to the Lodi area when it was expanded along its western and southern borders in 2002.

The 28,000-acre (44 sq mi) "Jahant" is the smallest of the seven Lodi sub-appellations. The terrain is noted for its river terraces and old floodplain deposits. At the outset, approximately 8,000 acres (3,200 ha) were under vine. The low-lying topography is affected by the close proximity to the Mokelumne River and the Sacramento-San Joaquin River Delta which keeps the climate cool and dry. The climate is cooler, dryer, and windier than most of the other viticultural areas. Its delineated by the extent and reaches of the soil. The distinctive pink colored Rocklin-Jahant loam soil is its most distinguishing characteristic, according to the petition, giving the area a unique grape-growing environment.

== History ==
The name "Jahant" (/dʒɑːˈhɑːnt/ jah-HAHNT) is associated with the central portion of the established Lodi viticultural area in southern Sacramento and northern San Joaquin Counties. The name comes from Peter Jahant and several of his brothers, all 1850s settlers to the area. The Jahant family settled and successfully farmed in the Acampo area of the Lodi region, and, in 1912, Peter Jahant's son Charles planted 130 acres (53 ha) of grapes on the original family farm and on additional purchased land. Jahant Slough and Jahant Road, a light-duty, east–west road, are shown on the Lodi North and Lockeford USGS maps, in the approximate center of the viticultural area. Also, Jahant Road is shown in sections B–4, B–5, C–5, and C–6 of the Gold Country map, published in April 2002 by the California State Automobile Association. The Jahant Equestrian Center is on Jahant Road, and some area vineyards use Jahant in their names.

== Terroir ==
=== Topography ===
Elevations in the Jahant viticultural area vary from about 10 to 100 feet (3.0–30.5 m), according to USGS maps of the area. Also, these elevations rise from the west to the east, increasing toward the Sierra Range. The viticultural area is bounded by rivers on its north and west and is dotted with small lakes and sloughs. The larger Tracy Lake lies in the area's southwest, while a gas field lies in the area's southeast corner. The contours of the area, predominantly river terraces and old, eroded floodplain deposits, the petition continues, have developed from the actions of Dry Creek and the Mokelumne River.

=== Climate ===
The petition provides statistics and data from the Lodi, Sacramento, Folsom, Camp Pardee, and Stockton weather stations, which are close to the Cosumnes River viticultural area. The Jahant viticultural area, the petition comments, has cool climatic characteristics similar to those of the Mokelumne River viticultural area to the south. Both regions receive the Pacific marine breezes that funnel east from the San Francisco Golden Gate, through the Carquinez Strait, the Sacramento Delta, and into the Lodi area. There is also the cooling effect of persistent valley and coastal fog within the boundaries. The winds in the Jahant viticultural area are of high intensity and prolonged duration, similar to those of the Mokelumne River viticultural area to the south. In contrast, to the north and northeast of the Jahant area, the Alta Mesa and Sloughhouse viticultural areas have less wind intensity and warmer temperatures. The mean annual temperature of the Jahant viticultural area is 60.1 °F (15.6 °C), which is lower than that of the other viticultural areas except for the Cosumnes River and Mokelumne River areas, each of which has a slightly lower mean annual temperature of 60 °F (16 °C). Also, the degree day totals for the Jahant area are between 100 and 400 degree days lower than those of the other parts of the Lodi region, except for the Mokelumne River viticultural area to the immediate south. Finally, the Jahant area's annual rainfall is 18 in (457.2 mm), which is less than rainfall totals in the other areas of the Lodi region with the exception of Cosumnes River and Mokelumne River viticultural areas. The plant hardiness zones are 9a and 9b.

=== Soils ===
The Jahant viticultural area, located primarily between Dry Creek and the Mokelumne River, has distinctive pink Rocklin-Jahant soils that are principally sandy loams and sandy clay loams with massive structure, thickness, and hardened depth. The soils are classified as Mollic Pelexeralfs. These old soils have younger sandy surfaces and are generally different in structure, thickness, and depth from the San Joaquin deep reddish, gravelly clay loam soils found north of Jahant viticultural area. To the south, the light sandy loam Tokay and Acampo soils are young, deep and well drained, tend to be granular and crumbly, and of a fine texture without gravel, in contrast to the Jahant soils.
