= VCP =

VCP may refer to:

== Places ==
- Van Cortlandt Park, New York City
- Viracopos International Airport (IATA: VCP), near São Paulo, Brazil

== Organizations ==
- Communist Party of Vietnam, also known as Vietnamese Communist Party
- Verband Christlicher Pfadfinderinnen und Pfadfinder, a German Scouting association
- United Communist Party (Netherlands) (Verenigde Communistische Partij), a communist party in the Netherlands
- Victorian College of Pharmacy, at Monash University, Parkville, Victoria, Australia
- Victory for Change Party, a political party in Liberia
- Vienna Capital Partners, an independent corporate finance advisor and private equity investor
- Votorantim Celulose e Papel, a former Brazilian manufacturer of paper products

== Science and technology ==
- Valosin-containing protein, an ATPase enzyme
- Verville VCP, a 1920 prototype US Army Air Corps fighter plane
- Very Coarse Pottery, another name for briquetage
- Videocassette player, a device which can play but not record videocassettes
- Vitrified clay pipe, a pipe widely used in sewers
- Volume coverage pattern, a scan strategy for NEXRAD weather radar
- Viral citrullinated peptides, a target of anti–citrullinated protein antibody in rheumatoid arthritis
- virtual control panel (MCCS), monitor control protocol

== Other uses ==
- Veuve Clicquot Ponsardin, a French champagne producer
- Vinos de Calidad Preferente, wine classification system of Uruguay
