= Arrufiac =

Variety of grape

- Grape (Vitis)
- Color of berry skin: Blanc
- Species: Vitis vinifera
- Also called: See list of synonyms
- Origin: France
- Notable wines: Pacherenc du Vic-Bilh
- VIVC number: 651

Arrufiac (or Arrufiat) is a white French wine grape variety that is primarily planted in the Gascony region of South West France. It is a secondary grape in the wines from the Pacherenc du Vic-Bilh Appellation d'origine contrôlée (AOC). While the grape has had a long history being blended with Petit Courbu in Gascon wines, it has only recently experienced a resurgence of interest in the late 20th century following the release of white blends from Andrė Dubosc of Producteurs Plaimont, one of the region's largest co-operative wineries, in the 1980s.

== Wine regions ==
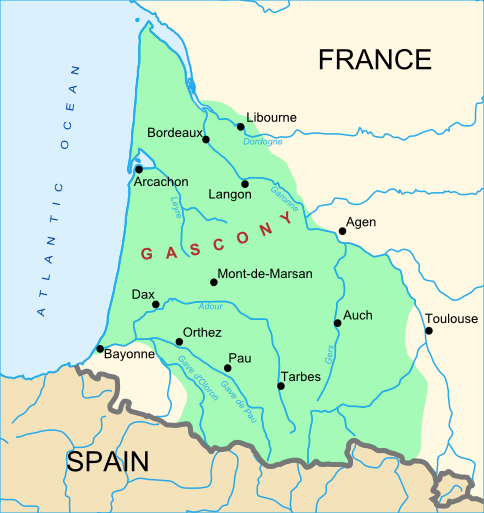
The Gascony region where Arrufiac has been historically grown.

Arrufiac has had a long history of use in the wines of Gascony, particularly those from the AOC region of Pacherenc du Vic-Bilh, covering the same area as Madiran, and those from the Béarn AOC in the Vic-Bilh hills. There, the grape was often blended with Petit Courbu which, along with Arrufiac's distinctive gunflint aroma, gave the wines of Pacherenc du Vic-Bilh a distinctive contrast to the white wines of nearby Jurançon. Additionally, winemakers in Gascony have blended Arrufiac with the other grapes of Jurançon, Petit Manseng and Gros Manseng.

== Wine styles ==
Arrufiac is used primarily as a blending wine with its medium body and relatively low alcohol levels for a wine grown in southern France. In blends, its main contribution is in the aroma and bouquet, with wines featuring Arrufiac often marked by a distinctive gunflint note.

== Synonyms ==
Arrufiac and its wines are known under a variety of synonyms including Ambre, Arafiat, Arrefiac, Arrefiat, Arrufiat, Arufiat, Raffiac, Raffiat, Refiat, Rouffiac Femelle, Ruffiac, Ruffiac Blanc, and Rufiat.
