= Mokelumne River AVA =

American Viticultural Area in San Joaquin County, California

Coordinates: 38°09′29″N 121°12′43″W

Mokelumne River
- Wine region
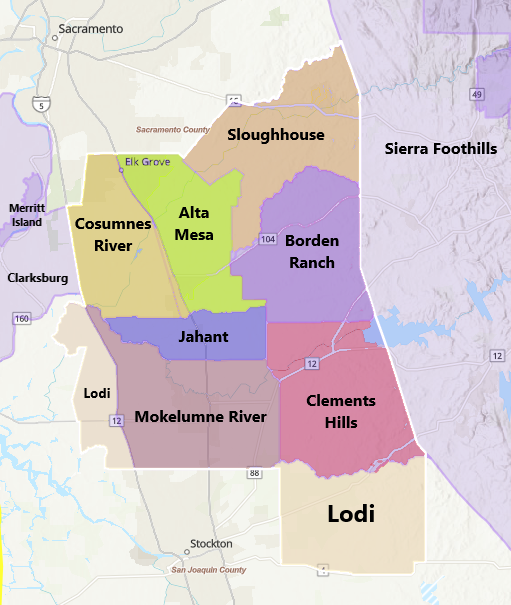
- Type: American Viticultural Area
- Year established: 2006
- Years of wine industry: 140
- Country: United States
- Part of: California, Central Valley, San Joaquin County, Lodi AVA
- Other regions in California, Central Valley, San Joaquin County, Lodi AVA: Borden Ranch AVA, Clements Hills AVA, Cosumnes River AVA, Jahant AVA
- Growing season: 279 days
- Climate region: Region Ib-III
- Heat units: 2,222–3,634 GDD units
- Precipitation (annual average): 17.57 inches (446 mm)
- Soil conditions: "classic, young" alluvial fan, sandy loam Tokay and Acampo soils
- Total area: 87,500 acres (137 sq mi)
- Size of planted vineyards: 42,000+ acres (16,997 ha)
- No. of vineyards: 10
- Grapes produced: Albarino, Alicante Bouschet, Cabernet Sauvignon, Carignan, Chardonnay, Flame Tokay, Graciano, Grenache, Grenache Blanc, Petite Sirah, Roussanne, Viognier, Zinfandel
- No. of wineries: 7

Mokelumne River is an American Viticultural Area (AVA) located in northern San Joaquin County, California within the southwestern portion of the vast Lodi AVA. The viticultural area's midpoint is approximately 38 miles (61 km) southeast of downtown Sacramento and 5.5 miles (9 km) east from downtown Lodi. The AVA encompasses the city of Lodi and the census-designated communities of Woodbridge, Acampo and Victor. It was established as the nation's 180th, the state's 103rd and the county's sixth appellation on July 17, 2006, by the Alcohol and Tobacco Tax and Trade Bureau (TTB), Treasury after reviewing the petition submitted by Lodi American Viticultural Areas (LAVA) Steering Committee proposing a viticultural area in San Joaquin County known as "'Mokelumne River."

The LAVA Steering Committee actually petitioned TTB in 2003 for seven new viticultural areas within the boundaries of the existing Lodi viticultural area in southern Sacramento and northern San Joaquin Counties. The seven LAVA Steering Committee petitions proposed the creation of the Alta Mesa, Borden Ranch, Clements Hills, Cosumnes River, Jahant, Mokelumne River, and Sloughhouse viticultural areas. The sixteen wine industry members that comprise the committee stated that their proposal subdivides the existing Lodi area into "seven smaller viticultural areas of distinction." The establishment of the seven viticultural areas did not in any way affect the 551,500-acre (861.7 sq mi) Lodi AVA which continues as a single American viticultural area within its current boundary. However, the TTB ruled that the seven proposed areas fall entirely within the 1986 original 458,000-acre (716 sq mi) boundaries and thus, as proposed, would not include any of the 93,500 acres (146.1 sq mi) added to Lodi AVA when it was expanded along its western and southern borders in 2002.

The AVA is named after the Mokelumne River, which drains out of the Sierra Nevada Mountains into the San Joaquin River and flows through the heart of the appellation. The wine region includes a portion of the lower Mokelumne River and its tributary, the Cosumnes River. Mokelumne River AVA encompasses 87,500 acres (137 sq mi) as Lodi's largest sub-appellation where more than 42,000 acres (16,997 ha) cultivate wine grapes. The soil is alluvial fan deposits of sand and loam. Ample rainfall and soil moisture retention allows most grape growers to farm without the use of irrigation.

Mokelumne River is the historic source of Lodi's oldest vine. The grape variety called Tokay, more properly known by its full name, Flame Tokay, which for about 100 years was the most widely planted grape in the Lodi region. Its own rooted, head-trained Zinfandel, Carignan, and Alicante Bouschet, including Lodi's oldest planting, the Bechthold Vineyard Cinsaut, planted in 1886 as "Black Malvoisie", alongside a larger proportion of recent, trellised, continuously replanted vineyards.

== Name Evidence ==
Historically, the name "Mokelumne" (/moʊˈkɛl.əm.ni/ moh-KEH-luhm-nee) was given by the Miwok Indians and translated as "the place of the fish net." Known earlier as the Rio Mokellemos, the present spelling of Mokelumne was set in 1848 by John C. Fremont, as documented in the California Place Names, by Erwin Gudde, published in 1969 by the University of California Press. The city of Lodi originally was "Mokelumne," becoming "Lodi" in 1874. The Mokelumne River, which flows west from the Sierras into the San Joaquin Valley, is shown on a number of USGS maps, including the Lockeford Lodi North, Bruceville, Thornton, Clements, and Wallace maps. Other maps also show the river, including the Gold Country map published by the California State Automobile Association in April 2002.

== Terroir ==
=== Topography ===
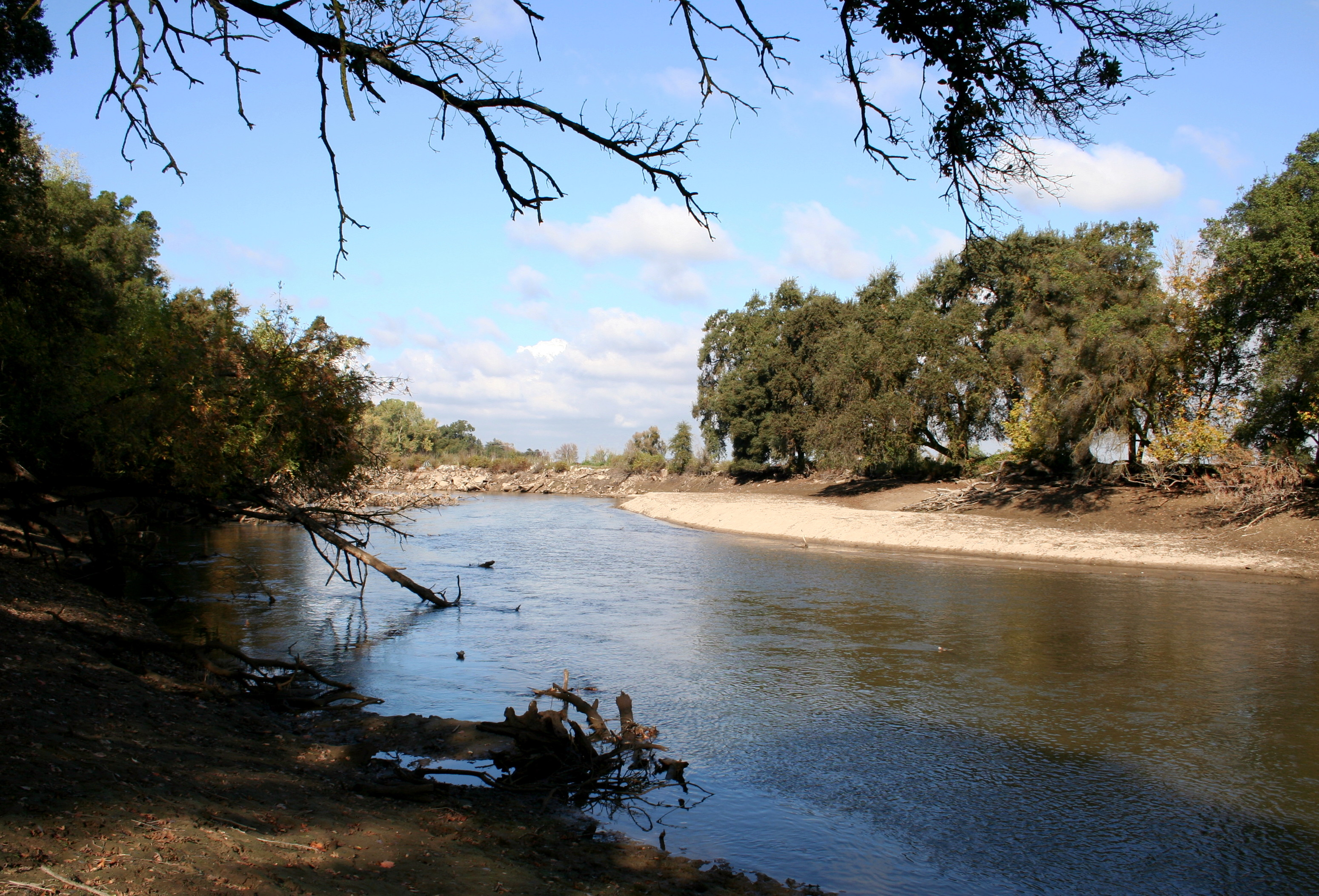
Mokelumne River in Lodi, California

The Mokelumne River meanders through the northern portion of the viticultural area, while creeks, sloughs, a canal, and an aqueduct run through its interior. Also, the city of Lodi is located on the south bank of the Mokelumne River in the approximate center of the viticultural area. The topography of the Mokelumne River viticultural area is dominated by a relatively young alluvial fan over an intermediate age fan. To the east, the fan joins with the older Mokelumne River terrace deposits along Jack Tone Road, which serves as part of the boundary line for the viticultural area. The Mokelumne River alluvial fan extends from the higher eastern elevations of the Clements region to the lower elevations along Interstate 5 and Eight Mile Road to the southwest, according to the provided USGS maps and the petition. The USGS maps of the Mokelumne River viticultural area show elevations sloping downward to the west from a high of 100 feet (30 m) at the northeast corner of the area to a low of 5 feet (1.5 m) at its southwest corner.

The petition explains that the "classic, young" alluvial fan of the Mokelumne River extends east-to-west through the Mokelumne River viticultural area. Given its distinctive geology and topography, the river's alluvial fan contrasts with the geology and topography of the other viticultural areas discussed in this document and the areas beyond. According to the petition, east of Jack Tone Road, beyond the Mokelumne River viticultural area boundary line, are the older terrace deposits of the Clements Hills viticultural area, while south of the boundary, toward Linden and Farmington, the coarse deposits of the Calaveras River alluvial fan contrast with the sandy loam of the Mokelumne River viticultural area. To the west of Interstate 5, and beyond the original Lodi viticultural area western boundary line, very young organic and inorganic soils dominate the Sacramento Delta region. To the north of the Mokelumne River area boundary line are the older river deposits that distinguish the Jahant region.

=== Climate ===
The petition uses climate statistics and data from the Lodi weather station, which is located near the Mokelumne River viticultural area. The climates of the Mokelumne River and Cosumnes River viticultural areas are the coolest within the existing Lodi viticultural area. However, as the petition notes, the Mokelumne River area has less heat accumulation than the Cosumnes River area due to the Mokelumne area's exposure to more intense cooling marine winds. The Mokelumne River viticultural area, the petition continues, is the closest of the seven Lodi viticultural areas to the Carquinez Strait that funnels cool Pacific Ocean breezes eastward from the Golden Gate, through the Sacramento Delta, to the Lodi area. The winds in the Mokelumne River viticultural area are of high intensity and prolonged duration, blowing more than 70 percent of the time. The winds lose little intensity as they cross the low elevations and flat terrain within the boundaries. The mean annual temperature within the Mokelumne viticultural area is 60.0 °F (15.6 °C), which is the same as the Cosumnes River area to the north but lower than that of each of the other viticultural areas discussed in this document, according to the petition. While the mean annual temperatures of the Mokelumne and Cosumnes areas are the same, the annual degree day total for the Mokelumne area is between 50 and 450 degree days lower than the totals for the other six viticultural areas. Rainfall within the Mokelumne River viticultural area is 17.57 inches (446 mm), which is the next-to-lowest of the seven viticultural areas. The USDA plant hardiness zones are 9a and 9b.

=== Soils ===
The petition explains that sandy loam Tokay and Acampo soils dominate the Mokelumne River viticultural area. These soils are young, deep and drain well, according to the petition. Also, the soils tend to be granular and crumbly, of a fine texture and without gravel. The sandy loams in the region are generally between 6 and 12 feet (1.8 and 3.7 m)in depth with low moisture holding capacity, especially in the western portion of the area.

== See also ==
- Mokelumne River
