= Manseng =

Manseng may refer to several wine grape varieties from South West France:

- Gros Manseng ("large manseng"), white grape
- Manseng Noir ("black manseng"), red grape
- Petit Manseng ("small manseng"), white grape
