= Mokelumne (disambiguation) =

The Mokelumne River is a river that flows from the Sierra Nevada mountains in northern California, USA.

Mokelumne may also refer to:

- The Mokelumne Wilderness, a federally designated wilderness area named after the river
- Mokelumne Hill, California, a town named after the river
- The Mokelumne Aqueduct, a water conveyance system that is supplied by the river
- The Mokelumne River AVA, an American Viticultural Area named after the river
