= Lodi AVA =

American Viticultural Area in California

Coordinates: 38°00′56″N 121°01′36″W

Lodi
- Wine region
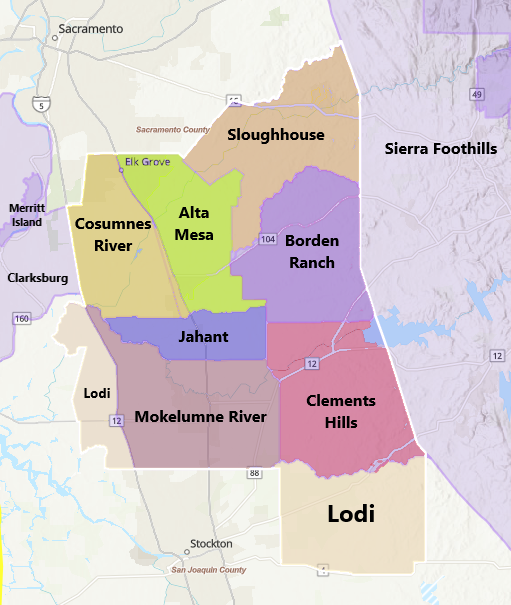
- Type: American Viticultural Area
- Year established: 1986; 2002 Expansion
- Years of wine industry: 140
- Country: United States
- Part of: California, Central Valley, Sacramento County, San Joaquin County
- Sub-regions: Alta Mesa AVA, Borden Ranch AVA, Clements Hills AVA, Cosumnes River AVA, Jahant AVA, Mokelumne River AVA, Sloughhouse AVA
- Growing season: 279 days
- Climate region: Region IV
- Heat units: 3,570 GDD units
- Precipitation (annual average): 18.26 to 24.03 inches (464–610 mm)
- Soil conditions: Hanford, Delhi, or Dinuba alluvial fans; or San Joaquin, Madera, Romona, or Redding in the terraces
- Total area: 458,000 acres (716 sq mi); 672,000 acres (1,050 sq mi)
- Size of planted vineyards: 39,000 acres (15,783 ha); 100,000 acres (40,469 ha)
- Grapes produced: Albarino, Alicante Bouschet, Alvarelhao, Barbera, Cabernet Franc, Cabernet Sauvignon, Carignane, Charbono, Chardonnay, Chenin blanc, Cinsault, Colombard, Dolcetto, Dornfelder, Flame Tokay, Gamay noir, Graciano, Grenache, Kerner, Lemberger, Malbec, Malvasia, Marsanne, Merlot, Mourvedre, Muscat Canelli, Petit Verdot, Petite Sirah, Pinot gris, Pinot noir, Pinotage, Riesling, Roussanne, Rubired, Ruby Cabernet, Sangiovese, Sauvignon blanc, Souzao, Symphony, Syrah, Tannat, Tempranillo, Tinta Cao, Touriga Nacional, Trousseau gris, Valdiguie, Verdelho, Viognier, Zinfandel
- No. of wineries: more than 85
- Comments: As of 2026

Lodi is an American Viticultural Area (AVA) located in the Central Valley of California, at the northern edge of the San Joaquin Valley, within portions of Sacramento and San Joaquin Counties, east of San Francisco Bay. It was established as the nation's 84^{th}, the state's 48^{th}, Sacramento County's second and San Joaquin County's initial wine appellation on February 13, 1986 by the Bureau of Alcohol, Tobacco and Firearms (ATF), Treasury after reviewing the petition submitted by the Lodi District Vintners Association proposing a viticultural area named "Lodi."
At the outset, the viticultural area encompassed 458,000 acres (716 sq mi) cultivating 39,000 acres (15,783 ha) of wine grapes. In 2002, the area was expanded to 159,500 acres (249 sq mi) with 10,840 acres (4,387 ha) under vine. In the western portion by 93,500 acres (146 sq mi) with 5,240 acres (2,120 ha) of vineyards and in the southern section by 66,000 acres (103 sq mi) with 5,600 acres (2,266 ha) added to the original boundaries within San Joaquin County. The appellation lies within southern Sacramento County and northern San Joaquin County. Its western border is outlined by Interstate Highway 5 and the eastern border is adjacent to El Dorado, Amador and Calaveras counties.

On July 17, 2006, the Alcohol and Tobacco Tax and Trade Bureau (TTB), Treasury established seven new viticultural appellations within the original 458,000-acre (716 sq mi) 1986 boundary of the Lodi viticultural area according to the petitions submitted by the Lodi American Viticultural Areas (LAVA) Steering Committee. The petitions proposed the creation of the Alta Mesa, Borden Ranch, Clements Hills, Cosumnes River, Jahant, Mokelumne River and Sloughhouse viticultural areas. The sixteen wine industry members that comprise the committee stated that their proposal subdivides the existing Lodi area into "seven smaller viticultural areas of distinction." Differences in topography, elevation, and soils distinguished the seven areas from one another. Also climate data such as temperature, precipitation, and wind patterns outlined their distinctive micro-climates. As of 2026, Lodi appellation contains more than 85 vineyards and wineries ranging from large family-owned estates to intimate boutique tasting rooms growing and processing over 135 grape varietals.

== History ==
The Lodi area has been a major viticulture region since the 1850s when wild grapes would grow down from trees along the edge of riverbanks. This led early trappers to call the Calaveras River, which runs through the southern portion of the area, "Wine Creek." Historically, the region was originally named "Mokelumne" (/moʊˈkɛl.əm.ni/ moh-KEH-luhm-nee) by the Miwok Indians which is translated as "the place of the fish net." Known earlier as the "Rio Mokellemos," the present spelling of Mokelumne was set in 1848 by John C. Fremont. The "Mokelumne" settlement was renamed "Lodi" in 1874.
The history of grapes and winemaking in the Lodi area goes back to the 1860's, but the first major plantings occurred in the period between 1880 and 1900. By 1921 the area was producing 127,692 tons of grapes. The principal grapes of this period were the Flame Tokay which created the first defined Lodi area in 1940 as a Tokay Marketing Agreement, a Federal Marketing Order. This first area was slightly larger than the proposed area as it included what are now urban areas in Sacramento County. The second time the area was defined was in 1956. At that time a definition was entered into the Congressional Record by Congressman Leroy Johnson and was approved by the Alcohol and Tobacco Tax Division for its use on wine labels. It has been used continuously since then. This second area is very close to the one proposed in the petition. At the outset, the name "Lodi" was currently being used by five of the wineries in the district. It has been recognized for at least seven decades as a distinct viticultural area producing 20% of the Californian wine.

== Terroir ==
=== Topography ===
The Lodi viticultural area is an inland area that is comprised mainly of alluvial fan, flood plain lands, and lower and higher terrace lands.

=== Climate ===
The moderating effect of breezes from San Francisco Bay makes this area distinctive. Any northern boundary for the Lodi viticultural area located significantly closer to Sacramento. and any other southern boundary located significantly closer to Stockton. would include land which experiences annual degree days more comparable to Sacramento and Stockton than to Lodi. To quote the United States Department of Agriculture (USDA) 1937 Soil Survey of the Area, "Owing to its location opposite the wind gap leading inland from the Golden Gate, the range in temperature is narrower than in more northerly and southerly parts of the great valley. Summer fogs are more common."
Temperature data covering the period 1973 through 1982 compiled by the University of California Agricultural Extension Station at Sacramento. and the United States Department of Interior, Stockton, show a mean of 3570 degree days for Lodi, 4185 for Sacramento, and 4366 for Stockton. The primary difference on the eastern boundary is the change into the Sierra Nevada foothills and the more upland soils. Also, an increase of rainfall is associated with an increase in elevation. The USDA 1937 Soil Survey notes, "Lodi, representative of valley plain, has 18.26 inches (464 mm) of annual rainfall; and Valley Springs, about eight miles east of the area, and more or less representative of the foothill country, has 24.03 inches (610 mm)." The USDA plant hardiness zones are 9a and 9b.

=== Soils ===
Although the land both north and south of the area has some similar soil structures, it is the combination of these soils with the moderating climate from San Francisco Bay that makes this area distinctive. The area west of Interstate Highway 5 and Franklin Boulevard is flood-prone, poorly drained, delta land consisting of Ryde soils and peat.The segment of Highway 5 that is part of the western boundary is primarily located on the first firm soil east of the Sacramento River system. Soils in the Lodi viticultural area are primarily Hanford, Delhi, or Dinuba in the alluvial fan soils; or San Joaquin, Madera, Romona, or Redding in the lower and upper terrace soils as shown in, Soils of San Joaquin County, California and Soils of Sacramento County, California, University of California, Berkeley, California, 1952 and 1954.

== Viticulture ==
Although Lodi is historically known for its Flame Tokay and old vine Zinfandel, Lodi also produces large quantities of Merlot, Chardonnay, Cabernet Sauvignon, Sauvignon blanc and specifically Albariño.

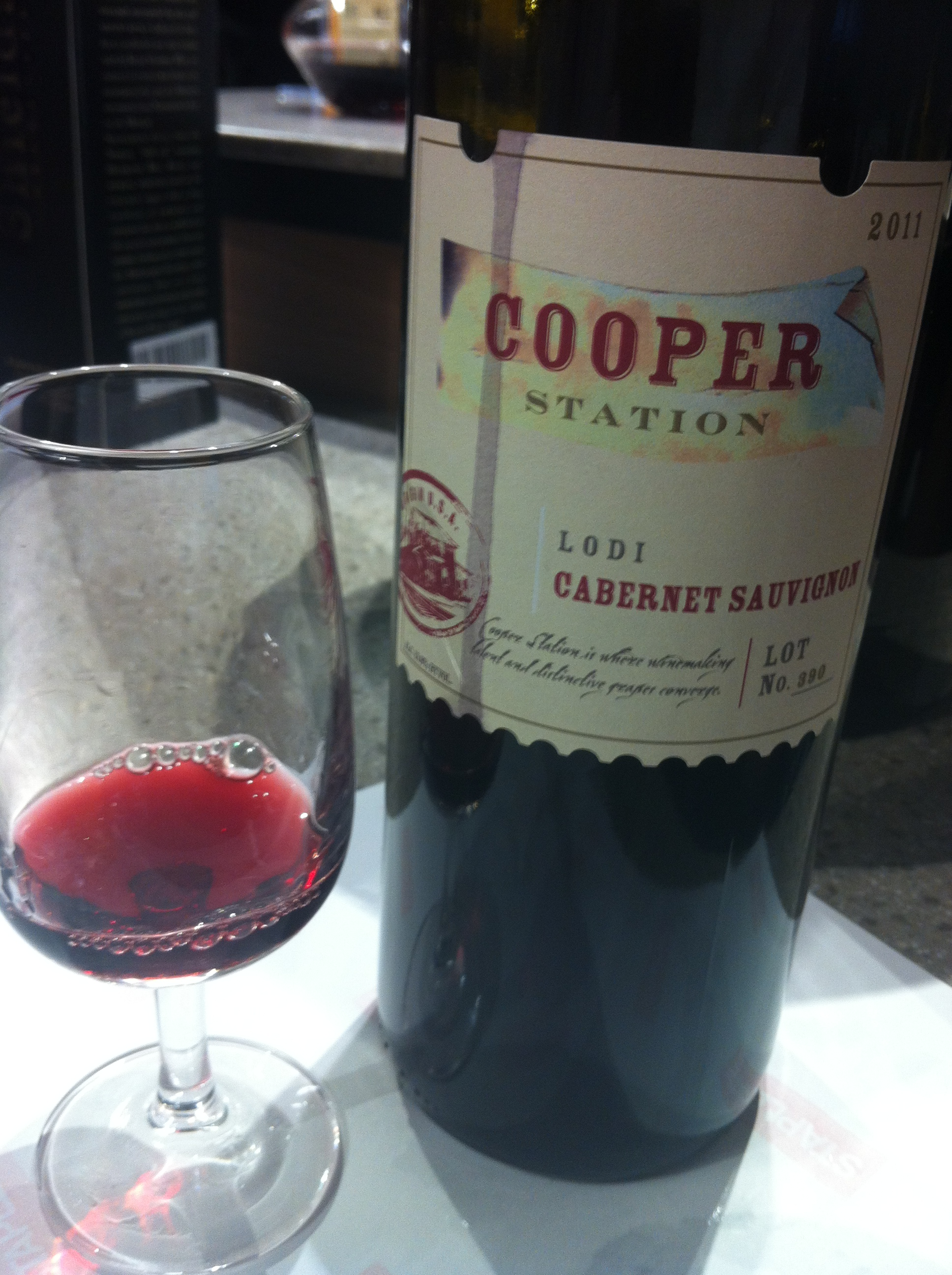
Cabernet Sauvignon

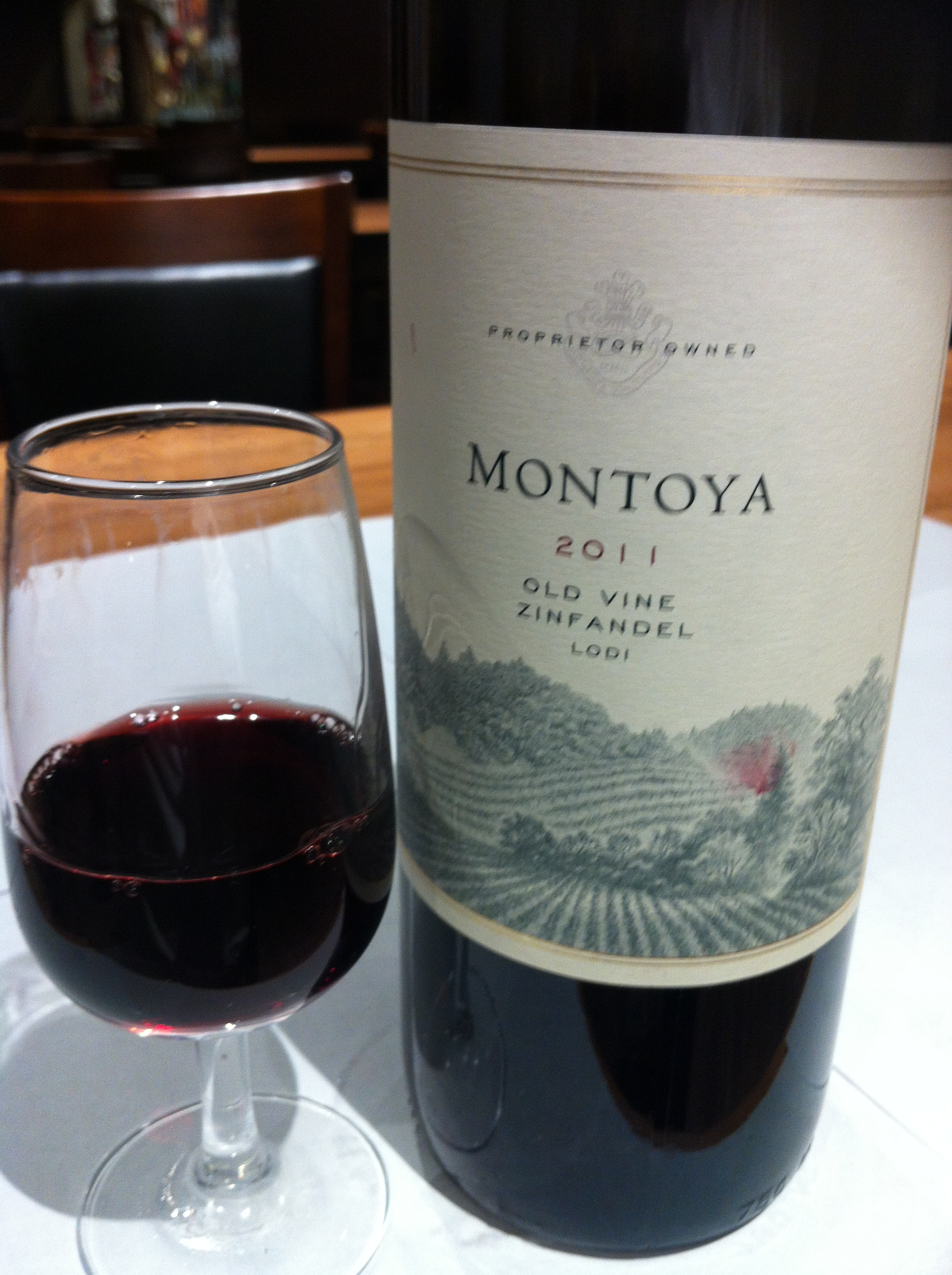
Old Vine Zinfandel
