= Borden Ranch AVA =

American Viticultural Area in Sacramento and San Joaquin Counties, California

Coordinates: 38°10′35″N 121°05′19″W

Borden Ranch
- Wine region
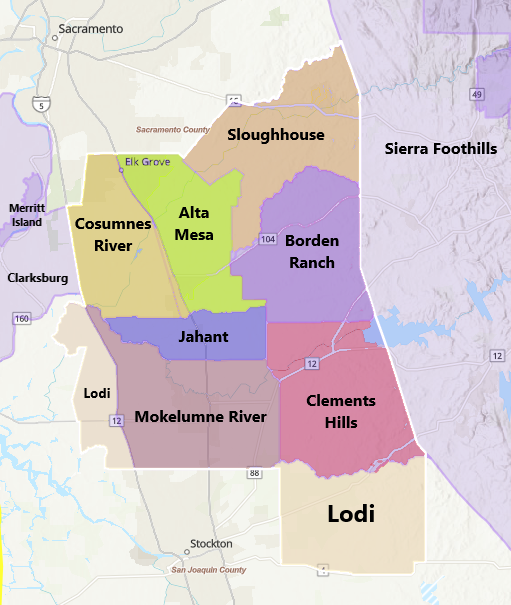
- Type: American Viticultural Area
- Year established: 2006
- Country: United States
- Part of: California, Central Valley, Sacramento County, San Joaquin County, Lodi AVA
- Other regions in California, Central Valley, Sacramento County, San Joaquin County, Lodi AVA: Alta Mesa AVA, Clements Hills AVA, Cosumnes River AVA, Jahant AVA, Mokelumne River AVA, Sloughhouse AVA
- Growing season: 303 days
- Climate region: Region II-V
- Heat units: 2,620–4,211 GDD units
- Precipitation (annual average): 20 inches (510 mm)
- Soil conditions: Alluvial with cobbles, clay pan, and clay loam
- Total area: 70,000 acres (109 sq mi)
- Size of planted vineyards: 11,000+ acres (4,500+ ha)
- No. of vineyards: 4
- Grapes produced: Albariño, Cabernet Sauvignon, Garnacha Blanca, Grenache Blanc, Verdelho, Zinfandel
- No. of wineries: 6

Borden Ranch is an American Viticultural Area (AVA) located in southern Sacramento and northern San Joaquin Counties in the east-central portion of the larger Lodi appellation. The area lies approximately 27 miles (43 km) southeast of the city of Sacramento, 13 miles (21 km) north of the city of Lodi and encompasses the census-designated place of Clay. It was established as the nation's 158^{th}, the state's 99^{th}, Sacramento's fourth and San Joaquin County's third AVA on July 17, 2006 by the Alcohol and Tobacco Tax and Trade Bureau (TTB), Treasury after reviewing the petition submitted by the Lodi American Viticultural Areas (LAVA) Steering Committee proposing a viticultural area in Sacramento County known as "Borden Ranch."

The Lodi American Viticultural Areas (LAVA) Steering Committee actually petitioned TTB to establish seven new viticultural areas within the boundaries of the existing Lodi viticultural area in southern Sacramento and northern San Joaquin Counties. The seven LAVA Steering Committee petitions proposed the creation of the Alta Mesa, Borden Ranch, Clements Hills, Cosumnes River, Jahant, Mokelumne River, and Sloughhouse viticultural areas. The sixteen wine industry members that comprise the committee stated that their proposal subdivides the existing Lodi area into "seven smaller viticultural areas of distinction." The establishment of the seven viticultural areas did not in any way affect the 551,500-acre (861.7 sq mi) Lodi AVA which continues as a single American viticultural area within its current boundary. However, the TTB ruled that the seven proposed areas fall entirely within the 1986 original 458,000-acre (716 sq mi) boundaries and thus, as proposed, would not include any of the 93,500 acres (146.1 sq mi) added to Lodi AVA when it was expanded along its western and southern borders in 2002.

The Borden Ranch viticultural area encompasses 70,000 acres (109 sq mi) with approximately 11,000+ acres (4,500+ ha) under vine. Its vineyards are located at altitudes between 73 and 520 feet (22–158 m) above sea level. The northern edge of the AVA is defined by Laguna Creek and the southern edge is defined by Dry Creek, both of which flow out of the foothills of the Sierra Nevada Mountains into the San Joaquin Valley. The soils in Borden Ranch is alluvial with cobbles, clay pan, and clay loam. Red wine grape varietals are the most commercially important grapes in the area. Situated between the Sierra Foothills to the east and the San Joaquin Valley to the west, the viticultural area has a distinctive terrain of old alluvial fans, river terraces and plains, and high elevations. The plant hardiness zone is 9b.

== Name Evidence ==
In 1864, Ivey Lewis Borden established the Borden Ranch in this area which became a well-known breeding ranch for thoroughbred racing horses and Hereford cattle, and local residents have used the name ever since, according to the petition. For example, the petition notes an August 16, 1929, Stockton Daily Evening Record article reporting on a barn fire on the Borden Ranch that killed a famous horse. More recently, the Borden Ranch name appeared in a court case and related news media stories involving a developer who sued the U.S. Army Corps of Engineers over wetlands issues, and the petition included a January 6, 2003, Sacramento Business Journal article on the case. The petition states that since the 1970s, when the Burton and DeDomenico families began the first major grape plantings within the area, local residents have also come to know Borden Ranch for its grape growing. Since that time, Sutter Home, Mondavi, and Delicato have also planted vineyards in the area. The petition also claims that between 1995 and 1996, the single largest vineyard expansion in California history occurred in this area. In addition, the petition includes articles from the April 8, 2003, Stockton Record and the April 18, 2003, Modesto Bee that discuss recent vineyard development around Clay Station. Named for a popular stagecoach stop from the California Gold Rush days and located on the historic Borden Ranch, Clay Station is noted for its rich reddish clay soils and large stones, which provide for well-drained soil for grape growing, according to Stockton Record article.
The petition also included statements from local residents regarding the use of the Borden Ranch name. For example, Jeff Sparrowk, a longtime Clements-area rancher, notes that the Borden Ranch is well known for its quality grazing land and vineyards. Robert Disch, a Borden Ranch-area farmer, states that Borden Ranch has become well known since vineyard development began there in the 1970s. He adds, "We are happy to see the notoriety of this region increasing and can declare that the Borden Ranch has a well-known history in our community." Wine industry publications have also taken notice of the Borden Ranch area, according to several articles supplied with the petition. An article titled "Lodi & the Sacramento Valley Vintage 2000" from the Wine Institute's "Harvest 2000" publication comments on the "enormous quality potential" of newer grape growing areas "such as Borden Ranch." The Spring, 2002 edition of the V&E Trellis Wire, a publication of the Department of Viticultural and Enology at the University of California, Davis, includes an article about a student field trip to the Lodi-Woodbridge wine region. The article describes the students' visit to the Borden Ranch, which it characterized as a 4,000-acre (1,600 ha) vineyard region.

== Terroir ==
=== Topography ===
The Borden Ranch viticultural area has distinctive terrain due to its location between the Laguna and Dry Creek streams and its location at the base of the Sierra Foothills. The river terraces and stream deposits left by the Laguna and Dry Creek throughout the Borden Ranch area are its distinguishing and unifying feature. The area's lower, western elevations also have prairie mounds and vernal pools along these river terraces. Hills and ridges, which are the eroded remnants of very old river deposits, are found near the Sierra Foothills in the area's higher eastern elevations. In addition, the petition states, the oldest alluvial fans in Sacramento and San Joaquin Counties are found in the eastern portion of the area close to the Sierras. The Borden Ranch viticultural area inclines upward toward the Sierra Range, from 73 feet (22 m) in elevation along its western boundary to 520 feet (160 m) along its eastern border, a rise of 447 feet (136 m). While these elevations and rise are similar to the Sloughhouse viticultural area to the north of the Borden Ranch area, the Alta Mesa and Jahant areas to the west of Borden Ranch have peak elevations of only 138 and 105 feet (42 and 32 m), respectively. The existing Lodi viticultural area's eastern boundary also marks the eastern limit of the Borden Ranch area—beyond which lies the higher elevations and more mountainous terrain of the Sierra Foothills.

=== Climate ===
The petition provides statistics and data from the Lodi, Sacramento, Folsom, Camp Pardee, and Stockton weather stations, which are located near the Borden Ranch viticultural area. The Borden Ranch area has a greater diversity of topographic-climatic vineyard sites than any of the other six areas within the existing Lodi viticultural area. Vineyards within Borden Ranch area are found on hilltops or slopes, and in flat valley floors, facing different compass directions. These topographic variables are responsible for differences of sun, temperature, soil, water, and windiness in the vineyards. Borden Ranch area is windier, warmer, and wetter, than the lowland regions to its west. The combination of cooling Sacramento Delta breezes from the west and cold air drainage from the Sierra Foothills to the east, the petition explains, generates high wind intensity and duration in the Borden Ranch area. The petition notes that this windswept environment, in conjunction with the area's hills and stony soils, creates high water evaporation conditions in the vineyards that lessen the vigor of the grapevine growth. While the Borden Ranch area's degree day total is similar to that of the other six viticultural areas discussed in this document, its annual mean temperature of 60.4 °F (15.8 °C) is slightly warmer than the proposed Cosumnes River, Jahant, and Mokelumne River areas to its west. The Borden Ranch area is cooler than the Sloughhouse area to its north. Annual rainfall in the Borden Ranch area is 20 inches (510 mm), which is less than the 23 inches (580 mm) of the Sloughhouse area to the north, the petition states, but higher than that of the areas to its west.

=== Soils ===
The terrain within the Borden Ranch viticultural area exceeds 700,000 years in age, and is distinctively older than the terrain found in the other six Lodi viticultural areas. In addition, the petition notes, the oldest valley soils in the Lodi region are found on the tops of the terraces above the streams in the Borden Ranch area. These old Durixeralfs soils, include the Redding, Hicksville, Corning, and Yellowlark soil series. In contrast, the petition states that the surface terrain in the Sloughhouse viticultural area to the north of the Borden Ranch area and in the Clements Hills viticultural area to its south is from 125,000 and 250,000 years old, respectively, to 700,000 years old. Additionally, the Borden Ranch viticultural area's soils contain a large percentage of surface and below ground rock cobble, or stones, a feature unique to this area.
