= Uruguayan wine =

Wine making in Uruguay

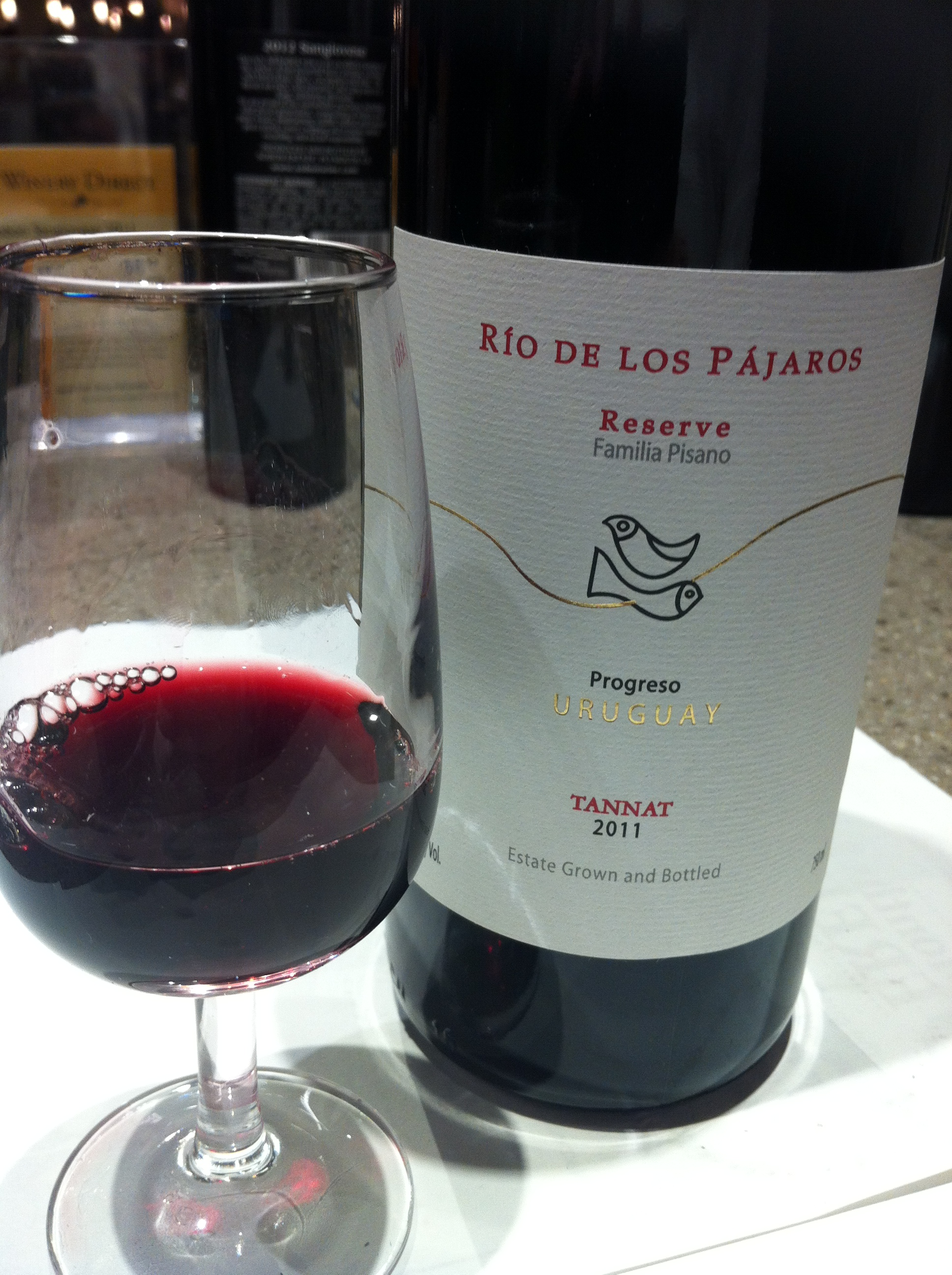
A Tannat wine from Uruguay.

Uruguayan wine was produced in the quantity of 102,964 tonnes from 9,023 hectares (22,300 acres) of vineyards in 2023, the fourth-greatest quantity in South America. Uruguay is most known for red wines produced from Tannat grapes, but white wines made from albariño are beginning to receive attention internationally.

== History ==
The modern wine industry in Uruguay dates back to 1870, when Tannat was introduced to the country by Don Pascual Harriague, a Basque. At the start, immigrants of mainly Basque and Italian origin were involved. In 1870,

Albariño was introduced to Uruguay in 1954 by immigrants from A Coruña, in the Galician region of Spain. When the Mercosur free trade association started to take shape in the late 1980s, Uruguay took steps to increase the quality of its wines and stepped up its marketing efforts, due to fear of being out-competed by Brazilian wines and Argentine wines, which had lower production costs.

== Classification system ==
There are two levels of classification for Uruguay wines:

- Vino de calidad preferente (VCP), a "quality wine" category. Wines must be made from Vitis vinifera varieties and are required to be sold in bottles of 75 cl or smaller.
- Vino común (VC), a "table wine" category. VC wines are often sold in demijohns and tetra paks, and much of it is rosé.

== Wine regions ==
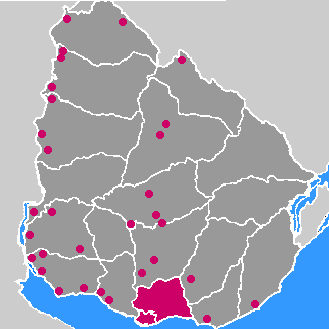
Former Wine Regions of Uruguay

Uruguay's wine regions correspond to its administrative regions. While the country's other forms of agriculture are grouped into cardinal-intercardinal-oriented zones, which are then further divided by departments, there has never been an official grouping of wine regions into the larger zones – based on publications released by the Ministry of Livestock, Agriculture, and Fish.

The majority of vineyards and wineries are located in the hills north of the capital Montevideo, particularly in the departments: Canelones, Montevideo, Colonia, and San José. With the disappearance of vineyards in Flores, Rio Negro, and Treinta y Tres, roughly from 1989 to 2007, there are currently vineyards in 15 out of 19 departments.

Uruguayan Vineyard Regions (2013 Statistics)
Department	Vineyard Surface area (ha)
Artigas	115
Canelones	5, / 046
Colonia	563
Durazno	89
Florida	49
Lavalleja	10
Maldonado	252
Montevideo	1, / 073
Paysandú	172
Rivera	47
Rocha	8
Salto	58
San José	502
Soriano	11
Tacuarembó	28

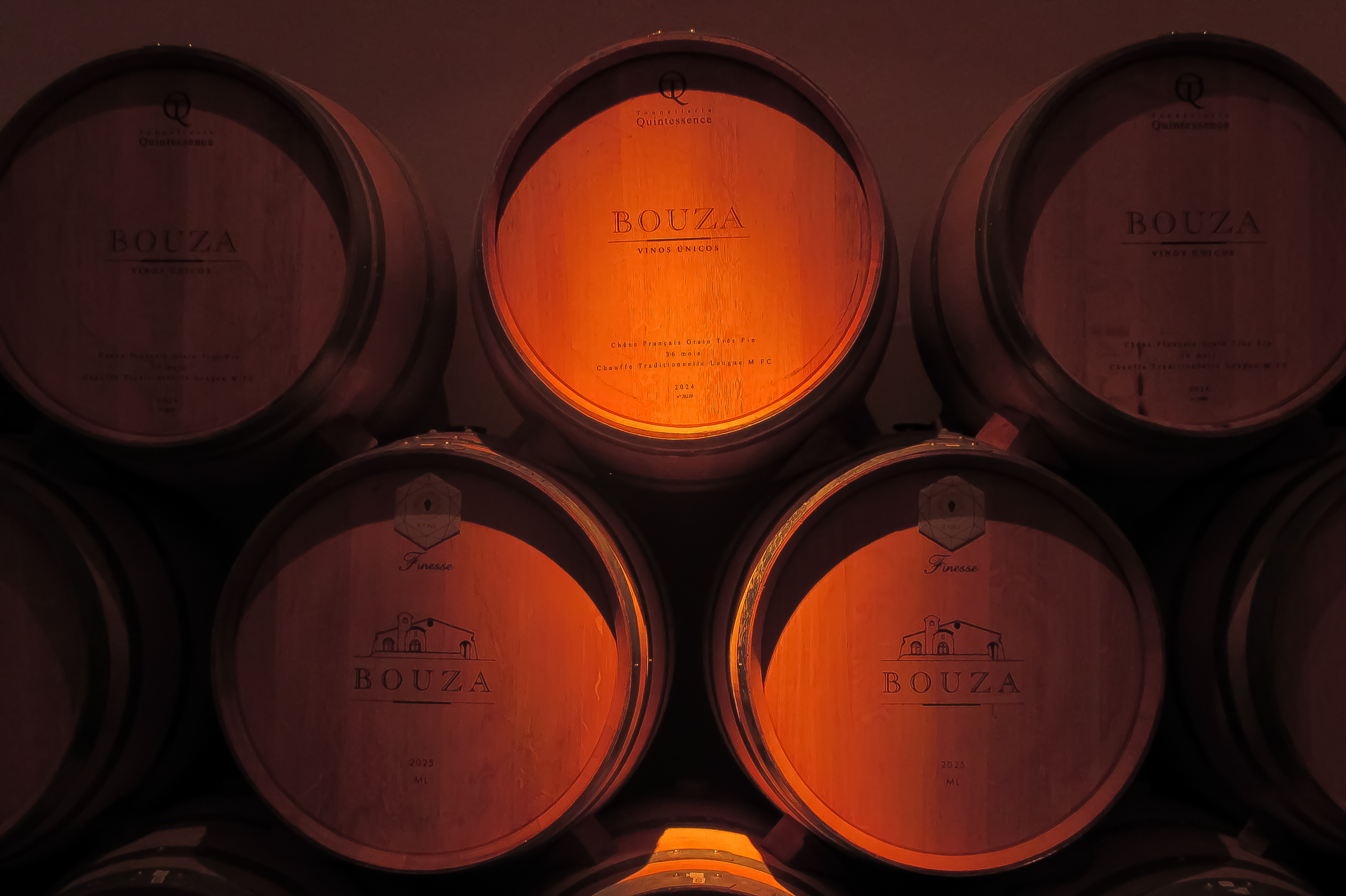
Bodega Bouza wine barrels from Montevideo, Uruguay.

== Grape varieties ==
Among the vinifera grapes, Tannat is the most common (36%). Other common varieties are Merlot (10%), Chardonnay (7%), Cabernet Sauvignon (6%), Sauvignon blanc (6%), and Cabernet Franc (4%). Muscat Hamburg is still a common variety for rosé table wines.

== See also ==
- Winemaking
- Agriculture in Uruguay
- Culture of Uruguay
