= Manseng noir =

Variety of grape

- Grape (Vitis)
- Color of berry skin: Noir
- Species: Vitis vinifera
- Also called: see list of synonyms
- Origin: France
- VIVC number: 7340

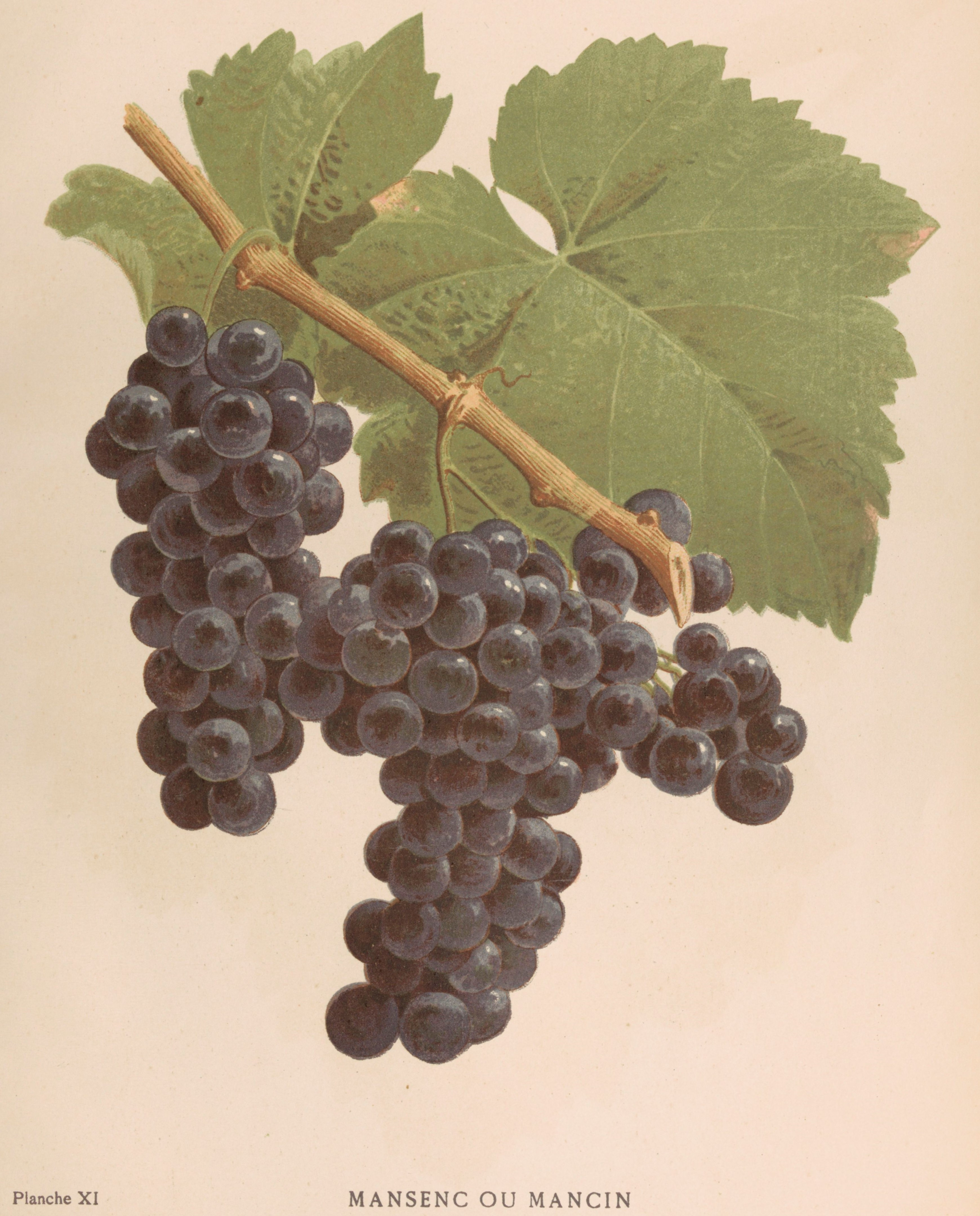
Lithograph of the Mansenc grape(1892)

Manseng noir (sometimes translated: Black Manseng) is a wine grape variety of Basque origins that is grown primarily in South West France. It is allowed into Béarn AOC wine but very little used. Manseng Noir is deep in colour and tannic.

Like Pinot noir and Muscat, the grape mutates easily and has spawn several additional grape varieties that are more commonly used in wine production, most notably Petit Manseng and Gros Manseng.

== Synonyms ==
Manseng noir is also known under the synonyms Arrouya, Courbu rouge, Gros Manzenc, Mancep, Mansenc Gros, Mansenc noir, Manseng rouge, Petit Mansenc, and Ferrón.

== See also ==
- Gros Manseng
- Petit Manseng
