= Microoxygenation =

Process used in winemaking

Micro-oxygenation is a process used in winemaking to introduce oxygen into wine in a controlled manner. Developed in 1991 by Patrick DuCournau, working with the exceptionally tannic grape Tannat in Madiran, the process gained usage in modern winemaking following the 1996 authorization by the European Commission. Today, the technique is widely employed in Bordeaux, as well as at least 11 countries, including the United States and Chile.

== Process ==
The process of micro-oxygenation involves a large two-chamber device with valves interconnected to a tank of oxygen. In the first chamber, the oxygen is calibrated to match the volume of the wine. In the second chamber, the oxygen is injected into the wine through a porous ceramic stone located at the bottom of the chamber. The dosage is controlled and can range anywhere from .75 to 3 cubic centimetres per liter of wine. The process normally occurs in multiple treatments that can last anywhere from one or two treatments during the early stages of fermentation (to help avoid stuck fermentation) to a more prolonged treatment during the maturation period that can last four to eight months.

Micro-oxygenation affects colour, aromatic bouquet, mouth-feel and phenolic content. Carboxypyranoanthocyanidins can be considered markers of microoxygenation techniques.

== Benefits ==
Exposure to oxygen during production may improve wine, but the exposure must be limited: too much oxygen can lead to oxidation while too little can lead to reduction, either one leading to its associated wine faults. In barrel aging, the natural properties of the wood allow for gentle aeration of the wine to occur over a prolonged period. This aids in polymerization of tannin into larger molecules, which could fall out of solution, not promoting protein precipitation in the mouth and thus improving mouth astringency. The process of micro-oxygenation aims to mimic the effects of slow barrel maturation in a shorter period or for lower cost. It also enables more control over the process.

During fermentation, the added oxygen can help maintain the viability of the yeast to minimize the risk of stuck fermentation and the production of undesirable sulfides. After fermentation it can aid in the clarification and stabilization of the wine without resorting to the use of fining agents.
