= Wine Institute =

The Wine Institute may refer to:

- Wine Institute (California), an association of wineries in California, United States
- Wine Institute (Greece), a governmental research organization in Greece
- Wine Institute of New Zealand, a former national industry body of New Zealand wineries, known since 2002 as New Zealand Winegrowers
- Australian Wine Research Institute, research body for Australian wine industry
- Institute of Masters of Wine, non-profit making industry association in Great Britain
