= Sloughhouse AVA =

American Viticultural Area in Sacramento County, California

Coordinates: 38°28′48″N 121°12′48″W

Sloughhouse
- Wine region
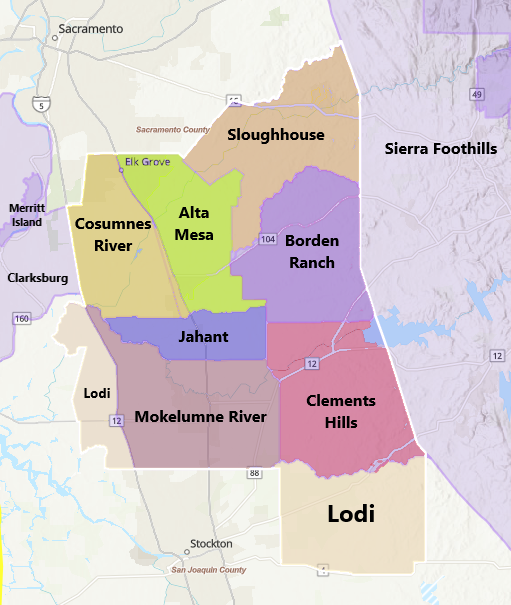
- Type: American Viticultural Area
- Year established: 2006
- Country: United States
- Part of: California, Central Valley, Sacramento County, Lodi AVA
- Other regions in California, Central Valley, Sacramento County, Lodi AVA: Alta Mesa AVA, Borden Ranch AVA, Cosumnes River AVA, Jahant AVA
- Growing season: 318 days
- Climate region: Region II-V
- Heat units: 2,784–4,412 GDD units
- Precipitation (annual average): 23 in (580 mm)
- Soil conditions: Older soils formed from sedimentary, metamorphic, and volcanic rock, including Sierra basement granite
- Total area: 78,800 acres (123 sq mi)
- Size of planted vineyards: 7,000 acres (2,800 ha)
- Grapes produced: Cabernet Sauvignon, Cabernet Franc, Chardonnay, Grenache, Merlot, Mourvèdre, Muscat, Petite Sirah, Petit Verdot, Primitivo, Sauvignon Blanc, Tannat, Teroldego

Sloughhouse is an American Viticultural Area (AVA} located solely in Sacramento County, California and occupies the northeast portion of the larger Lodi appellation. The area lies approximately 21 miles (34 km) southeast of the city of Sacramento, 22 miles (35 km) north of the city of Lodi and includes the unincorporated community of Sloughhouse on the northern broundary. This 78,800-acre (123 sq mi) wine appellation was established as the nation's 182^{nd}, the state's 105^{th} and the county's sixth AVA on July 17, 2006 by the Alcohol and Tobacco Tax and Trade Bureau (TTB), Treasury after reviewing the petition submitted by the Lodi American Viticultural Areas (LAVA) Steering Committee proposing a viticultural area in Sacramento County known as "Sloughhouse."

The LAVA Steering Committee actually petitioned TTB in 2003 for seven new viticultural areas within the boundaries of the existing Lodi viticultural area in southern Sacramento and northern San Joaquin Counties. The seven LAVA Steering Committee petitions proposed the creation of the Alta Mesa, Borden Ranch, Clements Hills, Cosumnes River, Jahant, Mokelumne River and Sloughhouse viticultural areas. The sixteen wine industry members that comprise the committee stated that their proposal subdivides the existing Lodi area into "seven smaller viticultural areas of distinction." The establishment of the seven viticultural areas did not in any way affect the 551,500-acre (862 sq mi) Lodi AVA which continues as a single American viticultural area within its current boundary. However, the TTB ruled that the seven proposed areas fall entirely within the 1986 original 458,000-acre (716 sq mi) boundaries and thus, as proposed, would not include any of the 93,500 acres (146 sq mi) added to Lodi AVA when it was expanded along its western and southern borders in 2002. In 2004 during the comment period, LAVA formally request a name change to the original petition for the proposed Deer Creek Hills AVA. They requested this name change because the name "Deer Creek" was too commonly employed throughout many areas of the United States, both inside and outside of the wine industry. The new name proposed was "Sloughhouse" because it was widely recognized within the boundaries of the region. It is referenced in the names of many local businesses and government organizations and was the name of the area where the greatest concentration of winegrapes are grown in the proposed AVA.

Sloughhouse AVA is distinguished by its warmer temperatures, more rain, elevations reaching 590 feet (180 m) above sea level reducing the influence of fog that cools lower elevation areas in Lodi, and older soils than the other viticultural areas. Sloughhouse is considered by some to be a transitional climate and terrain between the characteristics of the wine regions of the Central Valley and the adjacent established Sierra Foothills AVA.

On the area's 7,000 acres (2,800 ha) of vineyards are grown standard varietals such as Cabernet Sauvignon, Cabernet Franc, Merlot, Petit Verdot, Petite Sirah, Primitivo/Zinfandel, Grenache, Mourvèdre, Tannat, Teroldego, although there are extensive plantings of Chardonnay and Sauvignon Blanc, as well as Muscat varieties.

== Name Evidence ==
In 1850, Jared D. Sheldon built a roadhouse, hotel and stagecoach station along a slough on the Cosumnes River, hence the name "Slough House." The roadhouse was initially destroyed by a fire in 1890, but was rebuilt. Surviving numerous rebuilds after subsequent fires, it is now a registered California Historical Landmark. Today, the Slough House is a restaurant. Modern usage of the Sloughhouse name, according to petition evidence, is also seen in the names of the Sloughhouse Resource Conservation District, the Sloughhouse Fire Protection District, and the Sloughhouse Area Genealogical Society. The USGS Geographic Names Information System (GNIS) database lists "Sloughhouse" as a populated place in Sacramento County, California. The USGS Sloughhouse quadrangle map shows the hamlet of Sloughhouse along State Road 16 on the Township 7 and 8 North line, between Ranges 6 and 7 East. Sloughhouse Road, a secondary road, is shown on the USGS Elk Grove and Sloughhouse maps within the viticultural area boundary lines.

== History ==
William Daylor, one of John A. Sutter's cooks, who came upon the valley when out looking for some of his boss's livestock on a summer evening in 1840, according to a 1880 history of Sacramento County. The valley was and is a fertile floodplain for the Cosumnes River and Deer Creek. It looked good to Daylor, but was already populated by some of the area's Miwok Indians. "Daylor not being desirous of making any closer acquaintance at that time, did not descend into the valley," the Thompson and West history reports. Within a few years, William Daylor returned with a friend, Jared Dixon Sheldon, a naturalized Mexican citizen, who heard of the Cosumnes River Valley from Daylor. Sheldon, was given a Mexican land grant of nearly 20,000 acres (8,100 ha) by the government in Monterey, Mexico. The grant was known as the Ochumnes or Sheldon Grant. The area was populated by the indigenous Miwoks, who became workers for Sheldon. Sheldon soon planted the area around Deer Creek by seeds supplied by John Sutter. The first harvests were bountiful and Jared Sheldon and William Daylor quickly saw the need and built a gristmill. Unfortunately this also required a dam to be built. Gold miners, outraged at the fact a dam was to be built, wrote Sheldon letters and had several meetings with him to protest the building of the dam and telling him their diggings would be flooded. Sheldon, despite the protests, built the dam in 1851 and the miners diggings were flooded. To protect the dam, his mill and land, Sheldon built a fort. Miners soon captured the fort and attempted to blow up the dam unsuccessfully. Sheldon returned with his men and began a battle with the miners who were still trying to destroy the dam. Sheldon's men fired the first shots and soon two of Sheldon's men along with Sheldon, himself, were killed.

"Sloughhouse" began as a roadhouse/hotel and stagecoach station built by Jared Sheldon on Deer Creek in 1850. Today, the Sloughhouse is no a longer a hotel but the "Slough House Kitchen" restaurant. Pictures of Sheldon, William Daylor and Thomas Rhoades adorn the walls of the restaurant. Jared Sheldon married Catherine, a daughter of Thomas Rhoades and William Daylor was married to Rhoades' other daughter, Sarah.

== Terroir ==
=== Topography ===
The area surrounding Sloughhouse is often referred to as the "Cosumnes River Valley". The Cosumnes River runs right through the town of Sloughhouse. Sloughhouse viticultural area has the most diverse terrain of the seven proposed viticultural areas. A naturally woodland environment with gently rolling hills, flat creek and river valleys, plains, and an alluvial fan characterizes the area. The Sloughhouse viticultural area ranges in elevation from a low of 73 feet (22 m) in its southwest region to a high of 590 feet (180 m) in its northeast region, according to the USGS maps. The northeast region of Sloughhouse, which has the highest elevations in the area, slopes upward and becomes the bedrock-based foothills of the Sierra Range. These higher elevations are similar to Borden Ranch to the south, but contrast with the lower elevations of between 35 and 138 feet (11 and 42 m) of the Alta Mesa viticultural area to the west. Three significant waterways, the Cosumnes River and its Deer Creek and Laguna tributaries flow west from the Sierra Foothills through the Sloughhouse viticultural area. Deer Creek constitutes the northeastern boundary line of the viticultural area, as noted in the petition's boundary description. Deer Creek, according to USGS maps, then meanders southwesterly through the interior of the Sloughhouse area. The Cosumnes River runs roughly parallel to Deer Creek and through the approximate middle of the Sloughhouse viticultural area. Deer Creek eventually joins the Cosumnes River to the west of the viticultural area. The Laguna forms the south boundary line for the Sloughhouse viticultural area and joins the Cosumnes River and Deer Creek to the west of the area.

=== Climate ===
The petition used statistics and data from the Lodi, Sacramento and especially the Folsom weather stations, located close to the Sloughhouse viticultural area. The petition explains that the Sloughhouse viticultural area has a climate distinguishable from the surrounding viticultural areas due to its combination of warm growing season temperatures and heavy winter rains. The Sloughhouse area, at 61.6 °F (16.4 °C), is the warmest of the seven viticultural areas within the existing Lodi viticultural area. The average degree day total for the Sloughhouse area, according to the petition, is more than 200 degree days higher than that of the Alta Mesa area to the immediate west and more than 300 degree days higher than that of the cooler Borden Ranch and Clements Hills areas to the south. The Sloughhouse viticultural area, the petition claims, experiences little marine sea breeze influence as compared to the other viticultural areas to the west, which are closer to the Sacramento Delta. Also, the Alta Mesa "table-top" landform, to the immediate west, acts as a buffer between the west-to-east marine breezes and the Sloughhouse area. The Sloughhouse viticultural area receives more rain, 23 inches (580 mm) annually according to petition documentation, than the other viticultural areas. The petition states that to the west of the Sloughhouse area, the Alta Mesa viticultural area averages 18.5 inches (470 mm) annual rainfall, and, to the south, the Borden Ranch viticultural area averages 20 inches (510 mm) annual rainfall. Also, other viticultural areas discussed in this document average as low as 17.4 inches (440 mm) of annual rainfall. In addition, fog is less frequent in the Sloughhouse viticultural area than in the adjacent lower elevation and cooler Alta Mesa viticultural area to the west, the petition states. The upland environment, with less cooling marine influence and warmer temperatures, discourages the formation of fog. The USDA plant hardiness zone is 9b.

=== Soils ===
The predominant soils in the western portion of the Sloughhouse viticultural area are found on an older alluvial fan. Classified as Durixeralfs and Haploxeralfs, the soils series found there include a complex of Redding, Corning, Pentz, and Hadlesville soils, which are generally of low vigor. Older soils, including patches of significantly older soils, are found in the higher eastern elevations of the viticultural area. These older soils formed from sedimentary, metamorphic, and volcanic rock, including Sierra basement granite. Also, the Cosumnes River, Deer Creek, and the Laguna have left older river deposits within the Sloughhouse viticultural area.
