= Petit Manseng =

Variety of grape

- Grape (Vitis)
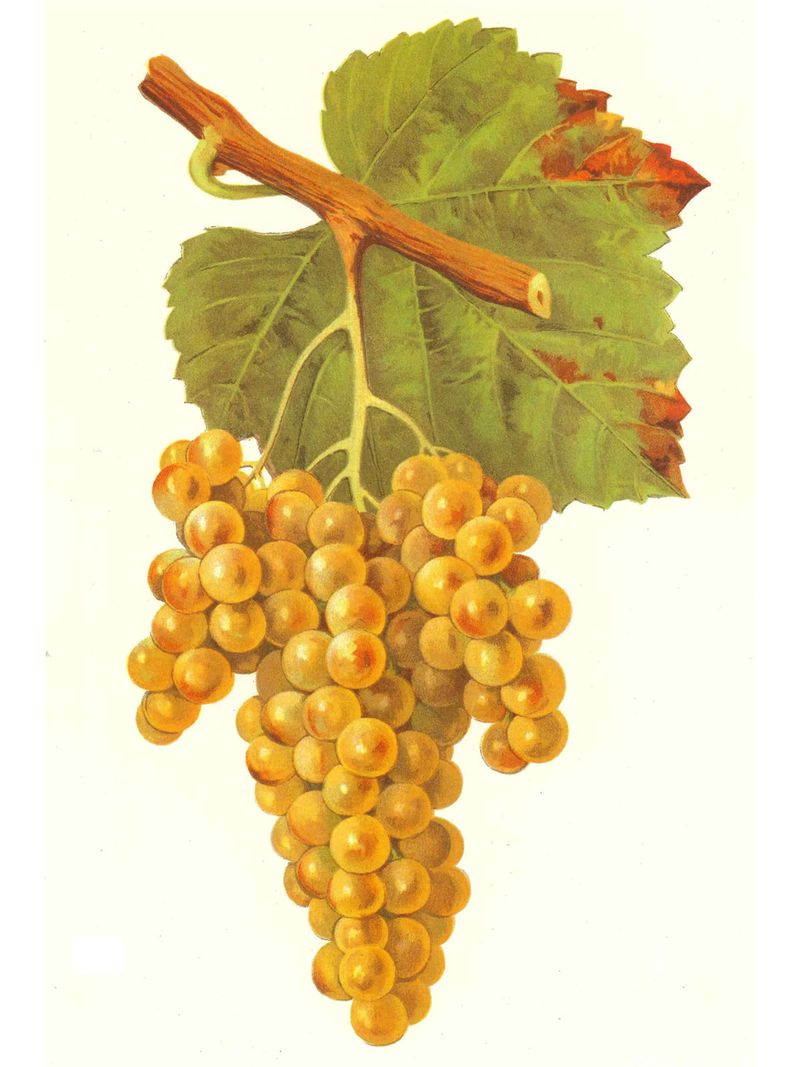
- Petit Manseng in Viala & Vermorel
- Color of berry skin: Blanc
- Species: Vitis vinifera
- Also called: see list of synonyms
- Origin: France
- Notable regions: South-West France, Languedoc
- Notable wines: Jurançon, Pacherenc du Vic-Bilh
- VIVC number: 7339

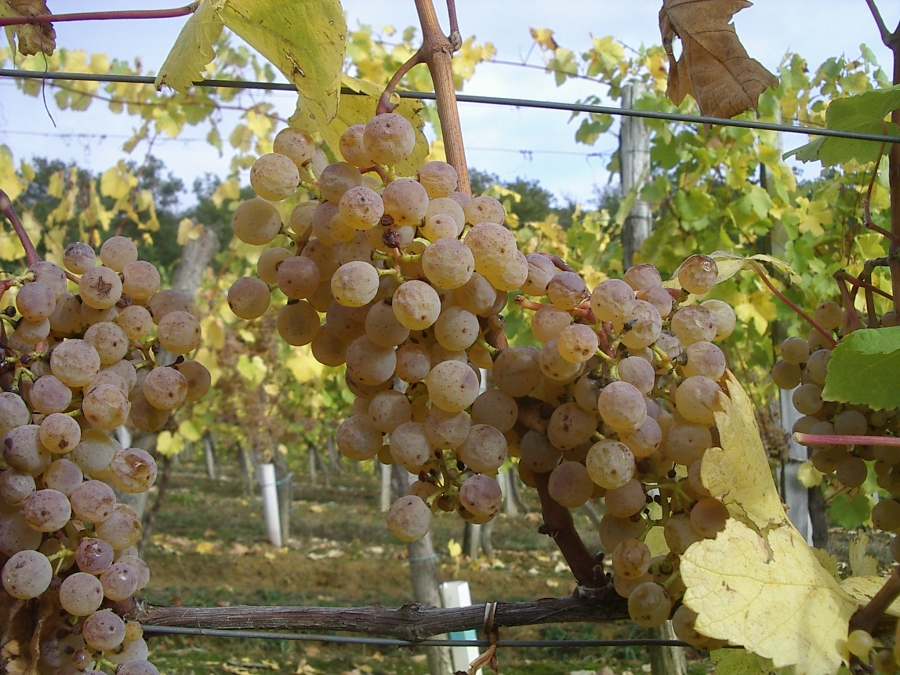
Late harvest Petit Manseng, drying to near raisins.

Petit Manseng (sometimes translated: Small Manseng, rarely "Little Manseng") is a white wine grape variety that is grown primarily in South West France. It produces the highest quality wine of any grape in the Manseng family. The name is derived from its small, thick skin berries. Coupled with the small yields of the grapevine, most Petit Manseng farmers produce around 15 hl of wine per hectare. The grape is often left on the vine till December to produce a late harvest dessert wine. It can develop high sugar level while maintaining acidity, so it is usually incorporated into sweet wines of Jurançon and Pacherenc du Vic-Bilh. The grape is grown primarily in Gascony, Jurançon and around Madiran (for Pacherenc du Vic-Bilh) but has recently drawn interest in New World wine regions like California, North Georgia and Ohio. In Virginia, it is reported to be the second-most planted white wine in the state with Michael Shaps and Early Mountain Vineyards producing award-winning examples for many years. In May 2020, CSIRO scientists discovered through DNA analysis that Australia's plantings of Petit Manseng, first imported in 1979, are in fact Gros Manseng. The reason is that it is expected to follow Viognier's path to popularity among white wine drinkers. It was already present in Uruguay, when Basque settlers brought "Manseng" and Tannat vines with them to their new home. Despite being easily recognizable as a white grape while true Manseng is a black grape, wine that is Petit Manseng is still normally labeled as just "Manseng". The grape is often left on the vine to produce a late harvest wine made from its nearly raisin like grapes.

== Synonyms ==
Petit Manseng is also known under the synonyms Escriberou, Ichiriota Zuria Tipia (in Spain), Mansein, Mansein Blanc, Manseing, Mansenc Blanc, Mansenc Grisroux, Manseng Blanc, Manseng Petit Blanc, Mansengou, Mansic, Mansin, Mausec, Mausenc Blanc, Miot, Petit Mansenc, and Petit Manseng Blanc.

== See also ==
- Gros Manseng
