= Storie (surname) =

Storie is the surname of the following people:

- Ava Storie, a ring name of Brandi Lauren Pawalek (born 1996), an American model and professional wrestler
- Craig Storie (born 1996), Scottish football player
- Frank Storie, Australian rugby league footballer
- Howie Storie (1911–1968), American backup catcher in Major League Baseball
- Jerry Storie (born 1950), Canadian politician
- Katy Storie (born 1979), English rugby union player
