= Madiran =

- Commune
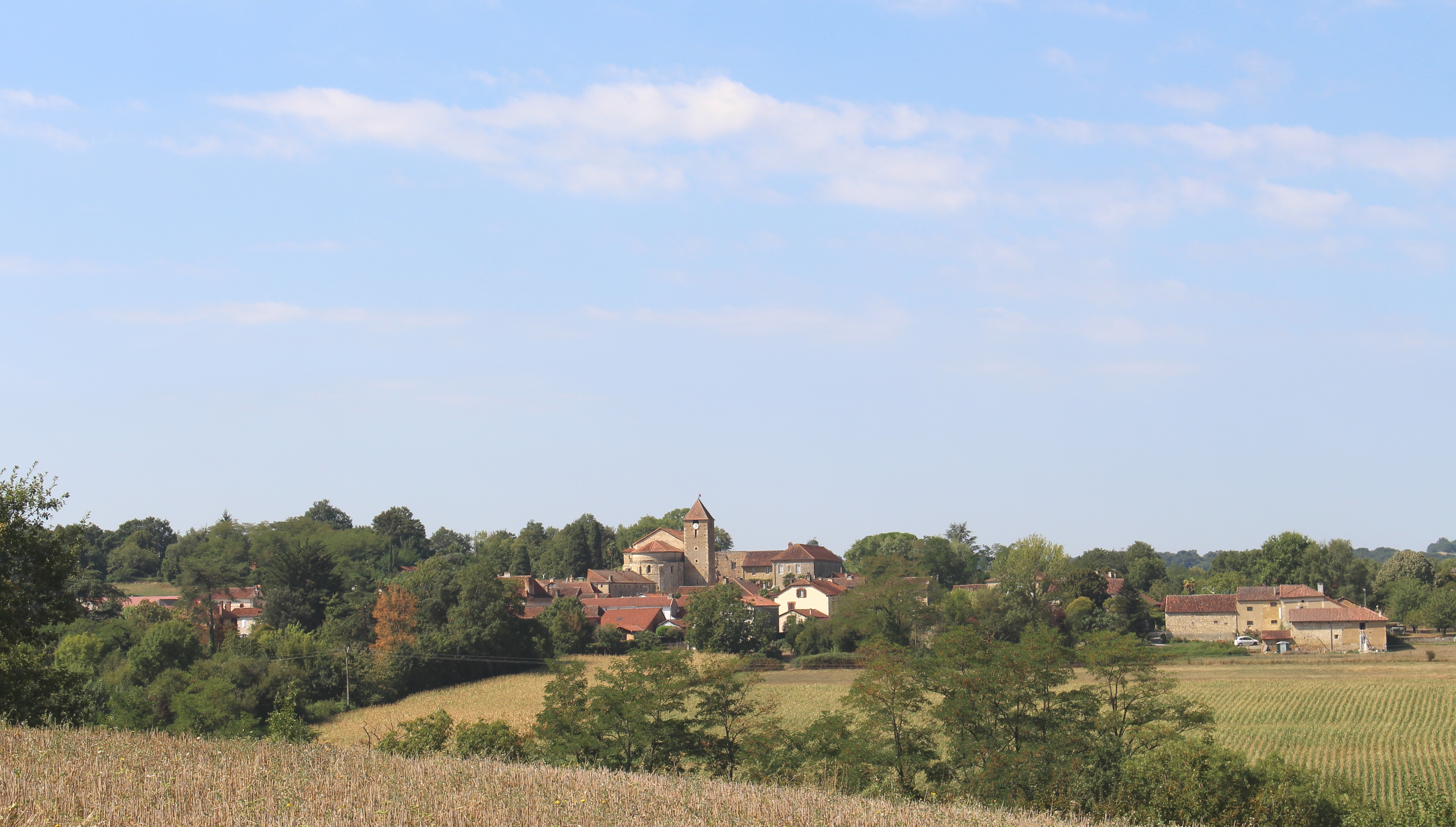

- Coat of arms
- Location of Madiran
- Location within France Location within Occitanie
- Coordinates: 43°32′58″N 0°03′28″W
- Country: France
- Region: Occitania
- Department: Hautes-Pyrénées
- Arrondissement: Tarbes
- Canton: Val d'Adour-Rustan-Madiranais

Government
  - Mayor (2020–2026): Fabrice Latapi
- Area^{1}: 15.02 km^{2} (5.80 sq mi)
- Elevation: 128 m (420 ft)
- Highest elevation: 262 m (860 ft)
- Lowest elevation: 133 m (436 ft)
- Population (2023): 424
  - Density: 28.2/km^{2} (73.1/sq mi)
- Time zone: UTC+01:00 (CET)
  - Summer (DST): UTC+02:00 (CEST)
- INSEE/Postal code: 65296 /65700
- ^{1} French Land Register data, which excludes lakes, ponds, glaciers > 1 km^{2} (0.386 sq mi or 247 acres) and river estuaries.

Madiran (French pronunciation: [madiʁɑ̃]) is a commune in the Hautes-Pyrénées department in south-western France.

It is the centre of a wine-producing area.

== Madiran wine ==
Wine is produced around Madiran under three Appellations d'Origine Contrôlées (AOCs): Madiran for powerful red wines primarily from the grape variety Tannat, Pacherenc du Vic-Bilh for sweet white wines and Pacherenc du Vic-Bilh Sec for dry white wines primarily from the grape varieties Courbu and Petit Manseng. The production area for Madiran wine, which consists of 1,300 hectares (3,200 acres) of vineyards, is spread over three departments of France—Gers, Hautes-Pyrénées, and Pyrénées-Atlantiques—and is a part of the South West France wine region.

== See also ==
- French wine
- Communes of the Hautes-Pyrénées department
