= Vinos de Calidad Preferente =

Vinos de Calidad Preferente is a wine classification system for Uruguayan wine. It was established by the Uruguayan government in 1993 by the 283/993 decree. VCP wines are made from vitis vinifera grapes, fermented to 8.6% to 15% ABV. VCP wines must be sold in glass wine bottles in the quantity 750 ml or smaller.
