= Cosumnes River AVA =

American Viticultural Area in Sacramento and San Joaquin Counties, California

Coordinates: 38°21′12″N 121°22′16″W

Cosumnes River
- Wine region
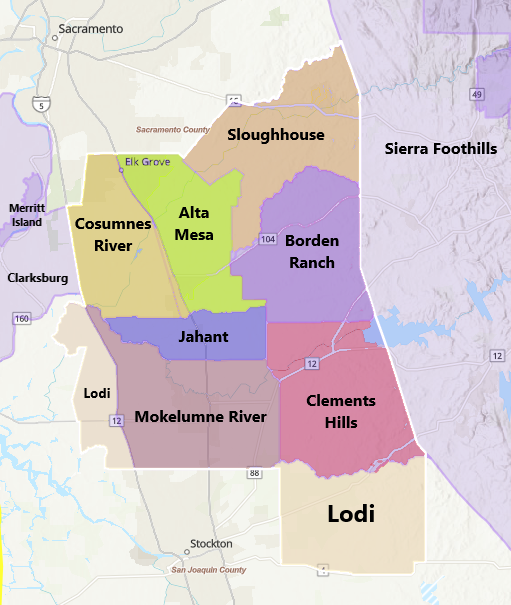
- Type: American Viticultural Area
- Year established: 2006
- Country: United States
- Part of: California, Central Valley, Sacramento County, Lodi AVA
- Other regions in California, Central Valley, Sacramento County, Lodi AVA: Alta Mesa AVA, Borden Ranch AVA, Sloughhouse AVA
- Growing season: 318 days
- Climate region: Region II-V
- Heat units: 2,784–4,444.5 GDD units
- Precipitation (annual average): 17.4 inches (442 mm)
- Soil conditions: San Joaquin series, gravelly clay loam with silty, alluvial soils in lower areas
- Total area: 54,700 acres (85 sq mi)
- Size of planted vineyards: 3,500 acres (1,400 ha)
- Grapes produced: Cabernet Sauvignon, Carignane, Chardonnay, Merlot, Pinot Grigio, Pinot Gris, Sauvignon Blanc, Syrah, Vermentino
- No. of wineries: 2

Cosumnes River is an American Viticultural Area (AVA) located in Sacramento County, California within the northwestern portion of the vast Lodi appellation encompassing the lower Cosumnes River. It lies approximately 20 miles (32 km) south of Sacramento and 14 miles (23 km) north of the city of Lodi while bordering the west side of the town of Galt. It was established as the nation's 177th, the state's 101st and the county's fifth appellation by the Alcohol and Tobacco Tax and Trade Bureau (TTB), Treasury on July 17, 2006, after reviewing the petition submitted by Lodi American Viticultural Areas (LAVA) Steering Committee proposing a viticultural area in Sacramento County known as "Cosumnes River."

The LAVA Steering Committee actually petitioned TTB in 2003 for seven new viticultural areas within the boundaries of the existing Lodi viticultural area in southern Sacramento and northern San Joaquin Counties. The seven LAVA Steering Committee petitions proposed the creation of the Alta Mesa, Borden Ranch, Clements Hills, Cosumnes River, Jahant, Mokelumne River, and Sloughhouse viticultural areas. The sixteen wine industry members that comprise the committee stated that their proposal subdivides the existing Lodi area into "seven smaller viticultural areas of distinction." The establishment of the seven viticultural areas did not in any way affect the 551,500-acre (861.7 sq mi) Lodi AVA which continues as a single American viticultural area within its current boundary. However, the TTB ruled that the seven proposed areas fall entirely within the 1986 original 458,000-acre (716 sq mi) boundaries and thus, as proposed, would not include any of the 93,500 acres (146.1 sq mi) added to Lodi AVA when it was expanded along its western and southern borders in 2002.

Cosumnes River AVA encompasses 54,700 acres (85 sq mi) where 3,500 acres (1,416 ha) are under vine. Its elevations range from about 5 to 48 feet (2–15 m) above sea level which allows frequent fog keep the Cosumnes River area cooler than other Lodi sub-appellations. The cooler Delta influences are beneficial to white wine varieties, Chardonnay, Sauvignon Blanc, Pinot Grigio and Vermentino, as well as reds, Cabernet Sauvignon, Merlot and Syrah.

== History ==
The name "Cosumnes" (/ˈkɒzəmɪnz/ koh-SOOM-nez) is derived from the indigeous Miwok term for "salmon people." An alternative translation is "the place of the koso berry." John A. Sutter, an early settler, provides an 1841 written reference to the term "Cosumnes River," and 1845 and 1848 maps by John C. Frémont label this waterway as the "Cosumnes River." The March 1, 1851, edition of the Stockton Times, in describing the region, states: "Some of the earlier settlements made in this country were along the Cosumnes."

== Terroir ==
=== Topography ===
The petition explains that the Cosumnes River viticultural area topography includes wetlands, natural and artificial levees, sloughs, streams, and the Cosumnes River. In addition, the Mokelumne River marks a portion of the area's southern boundary. A large alluvial fan crosses the Cosumnes River viticultural area and slopes towards its southwest corner. The low elevations found in the Cosumnes River viticultural area distinguish it from the surrounding, higher-elevation areas, the petition states. At its southwestern corner, where the Cosumnes River joins the Mokelumne River, the elevation of the Cosumnes River viticultural area dips to almost sea level. Elevations within the area gradually rise to a high point of 48 feet (15 m) at its southeast corner, according to the provided USGS maps. In contrast, the petition notes, the Alta Mesa viticultural area, to the east of the Cosumnes River viticultural area, has elevations to 138 feet (42 m). To the south, the Jahant viticultural area rises to 80 feet (24 m) in elevation, and the Mokelumne River viticultural area rises to 85 feet (26 m), according to the petition.

=== Climate ===
The petition provides statistics and data from the Lodi, Sacramento, and Folsom weather stations, which are close to the Cosumnes River viticultural area. Overall, according to the petition, the Cosumnes River viticultural area has a cool and breezy climate. With mean annual temperatures of 60 °F (16 °C), the Cosumnes River and Mokelumne River viticultural areas are the coolest of the viticultural areas in Lodi. The petition adds that the Cosumnes River viticultural area sustains intermediate level winds. The surrounding areas to the north and east are warmer and have less wind than Cosumnes River area. Also, to the south, the Jahant and Mokelumne River viticultural areas have similar cool and strong marine winds. The petition notes that the Pacific Ocean's cooling breezes funnel eastward through San Francisco's Golden Gate, the Carquinez Strait, and the Sacramento Delta to reach the Lodi area. These marine breezes cool the Lodi area's lower elevations, including the Cosumnes River floodplain and the areas to the river's south. The intensity and effect of these cooling winds, according to the petition, dissipate as they continue eastward over the Cosumnes River viticultural area to the Alta Mesa and Sloughhouse viticultural areas. The petition states that maritime and inland fog is persistent in the low elevations of the Cosumnes River viticultural area. This fog cools the viticultural area more than the surrounding areas, which are less influenced by the maritime winds. The annual precipitation within the Cosumnes area is 17.4 inches (440 mm), according to the petition, which is more than the low elevation areas to its immediate south, but less than the high elevation regions to the north and east of the viticultural area's boundaries. The plant hardiness zone is 9b.

=== Soils ===
The Cosumnes River viticultural area is dominated by young, alluvial soils that distinguish it from the surrounding areas. The petition notes that 60 percent of the agricultural land within the area is covered by a series of younger alluvial and organic soils, Xerothents and Histosols. These younger soils, the petition continues, predominate in the lower areas, including the floodplains, sloughs, and wetlands, and around the Cosumnes River and its tributaries along the western side of the proposed viticultural area. The intermediate-age, deep reddish, gravelly clay loam soils of the San Joaquin series cover the remaining 40 percent of the agricultural land within the Cosumnes River viticultural area. These soils, classified as Abruptic Durixeralfs, have good water-holding capacity and moderate fertility. To the east of the Cosumnes River viticultural area, the Alta Mesa viticultural area soils are of intermediate age, and about 90 percent of its soils are from the San Joaquin series. To the south, the Jahant and Mokelumne River viticultural areas have a combination of young and intermediate in age soils. According to the petition, the Storie index places the Cosumnes River soils at between 24 and 40 points for suitability.

== See also ==
- Cosumnes River
