= Gros Manseng =

Variety of grape

- Grape (Vitis)
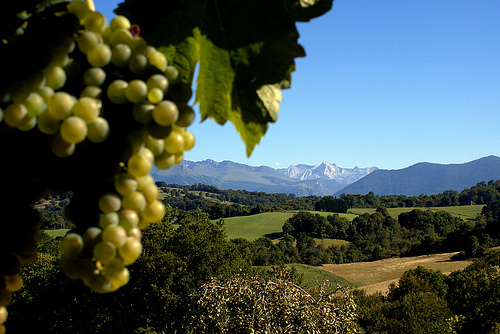
- A bunch of Gros Manseng grapes with Jurançon in the backdrop.
- Color of berry skin: Blanc
- Species: Vitis vinifera
- Also called: see list of synonyms
- Origin: France
- Notable regions: South-West France
- Notable wines: Pacherenc du Vic-Bilh
- VIVC number: 7338

Gros Manseng (sometimes translated: Large Manseng, rarely "Big Manseng") is a white wine grape variety that is grown primarily in South West France, and is part of the Manseng family. It produces dry wines in the Jurançon and Béarn regions of Southwest France. In Gascony it is permitted in the Pacherenc du Vic-Bilh Appellation d'origine contrôlée (AOC), in the Côtes de Gascogne and in the Floc de Gascogne.

== Comparison to Petit Manseng ==
While the grape vines of Gros Manseng and Petit Manseng look very similar to each other, there are distinct differences. Gros Manseng's berries are larger and less susceptible to coulure. The vine also produces much higher yields but the resulting wine is less elegant and rich than wine made from Petit Manseng.

== Wine styles ==
On its own, Gros Manseng has the potential to produce intensely flavored wines with high acidity, apricot and quince fruit along with spicy and floral notes. The time of harvest will play a large role in the type of wine that the grape will produce. When it is picked at a potential alcohol level of 11.5-12%, the resulting wine will have more characteristics of fresh fruit and flowers. If picked later at a potential alcohol content of 12.5-13.5, the flavors will be much more intense and powerful. Despite its thick skin, the grape does need gentle handling in the winemaking process. Unlike many wine grapes, the juice of the Gros Manseng is grey in color which means that it is already prone to produce deeply, golden colored wines with minimal skin contact. If the grapes are pressed too roughly or the grapes are left in extended contact with the skins, the resulting wine will be very coarse with excessive levels of tannins and polyphenols. Some winemakers are experimenting with making botrytized wine aged in oak that have drawn favorable comparisons to similarly made wine from Sémillon. That style wine is prized for its food matching ability, particularly with foie gras. In May 2020, CSIRO scientists discovered through DNA analysis that Australia's plantings of Petit Manseng are in fact Gros Manseng.
