= Storie index =

The Storie index is a method of soil rating based on soil characteristics that govern the land's potential use and productivity capacity. Developed by R. Earl Storie at University of California, Berkeley in the 1930s as a method of land valuation, it is independent of other physical or economic factors that might determine the desirability of growing certain plants in a given location.

- The evaluation is easy to be realized, being this an advantage of this method.
- A variety of categories are comprised in few categories.

Four or five parameters are evaluated:

- A: Soil depth and texture;
- B: Soil permeability;
- C: Soil chemical characteristics;
- D: Drainage, Surface runoff;
- E: Climate (only if it is not homogeneous, if so than it should not be included in the formula);

The index is calculated from the multiplication of these parameters, that is: Sindex = A x B x C x D x E

The disadvantage of this method is that if we have a value of zero in any category, then the result will be zero and won't be suitable for using. Another disadvantage is that the ratings are subjective. This methodology was updated in again in 2008 by O'Geen et al. to correct for some of the subjectivity. https://anrcatalog.ucanr.edu/pdf/8335.pdf
