= List of VDQS wines =

The following is a list of French wines that were entitled to use the designation Vin Délimité de Qualité Supérieure (VDQS) on their label, which was the second highest category out of four.

The VDQS category was abolished by December 31, 2011, when the number of categories for French wine were reduced four to three as part of a general overhaul of the European Union-wide classification of wine. Then-existing VDQS wines were either promoted to AOC/AOP status or demoted to Vin de pays/IGP status.

== VDQS Wines Prior to Abolishment ==
VDQS	Wine region	Comments
Châteaumeillant	Loire	VDQS in 1965
Coteaux d'Ancenis	Loire	VDQS in 1973
Coteaux du Quercy	South West France	VDQS in 1999
Côtes d'Auvergne	Loire	VDQS in 1977
Côtes de Millau	South West France	VDQS in 1994
Côtes du Brulhois	South West France	VDQS in 1984, also known under the name Brulhois
Fiefs vendéens	Loire	VDQS in 1984
Gros Plant du Pays nantais	Loire	VDQS in 1954, previously also written only as Gros Plant.
Haut Poitou	Loire	VDQS in 1970
Moselle	Lorraine	VDQS in 1951
Saint-Mont	South West France	VDQS in 1981, could previously also be called Côtes de Saint-Mont, but Saint-Mont is the only name since 2007.
Saint-Sardos	South West France	VDQS in 2005, aims for AOC status
Tursan	South West France	VDQS in 1958, promoted to AOC in 2011
Vins du Thouarsais	Loire	VDQS in 1966
Vins d'Entraygues et du Fel	South West France	VDQS in 1965, also known under the name Entraygues et Le Fel
Vins d'Estaing	South West France	VDQS in 1965, also known under the name Estaing
Vins de Lavilledieu	South West France	VDQS in 1954, also known under the name Lavilledieu

== Former VDQS wines elevated to full AOC status ==
VDQS	Wine region	Comments
Béarn	South West France	VDQS in 1951, AOC in 1975
Bugey	Bugey	VDQS in 1958, AOC in 2009
Cabardès or Côtes du Cabardès et de l'Orbiel	Languedoc	AOC in 1999 under the sole name Cabardès
Cheverny	Loire	VDQS in 1973, AOC in 1993
Costières du Gard	Languedoc	AOC in 1986, renamed to Costières de Nîmes in 1989, and in 2004 reassigned to the Rhône region
Coteaux d'Ajaccio	Corsica	VDQS in 1971, AOC in 1976 as part of Corse or Vin du Corse, separate AOC in 1984
Coteaux du Giennois	Loire	VDQS 1954, AOC in 1998
Coteaux du Lyonnais	Lyonnais	VDQS in 1952 (could also be called Vins du Lyonnais), AOC in 1984
Coteaux du Vendômois	Loire	VDQS in 1968, AOC in 2001
Côtes de Buzet	South West France	VDQS in 1953, AOC in 1973, renamed to Buzet in 1986
Côtes du Forez	Burgundy	AOC in 2000
Côtes du Marmandais	South West France	VDQS in 1975, AOC in 1990
Côtes de la Malepère	Languedoc	VDQS in 1983, AOC in 2007
Côtes de Toul	Lorraine	AOC in 1998
Côtes du Vivarais	Rhône	VDQS in 1962, AOC in 1999
Orléans	Loire	Renamed from Vins de l'Orléanais to Orléans in 2002, AOC in 2006
Orléans-Cléry	Loire	Created in 2002, AOC in 2006
Patrimonio	Corsica	VDQS in 1968, AOC in 1976 as part of Corse or Vin du Corse, separate AOC in 1984
Roussette du Bugey	Bugey	VDQS in 1958, AOC in 2009
Saint-Pourçain	Loire	VDQS in 1951 under the name Vins de Saint-Pourçain sur Sioule, renamed to Saint-Pourçain in 1982, AOC in 2009
Sartène	Corsica	VDQS in 1968, could also be called Vin du Sartenais, AOC in 1976 as part of Corse or Vin du Corse
Sauvignon de Saint-Bris	Burgundy	AOC in 2003 under the name Saint-Bris
Valençay	Loire	VDQS in 1970, AOC in 2004
Vin de Marcillac	South West France	VDQS in 1965, AOC in 1990 under the name Marcillac

== See also ==
- French wine
- Vin Délimité de Qualité Supérieure
- List of Appellation d'Origine Contrôlée wines
