= Béquignol =

Béquignol is the name of several French wine grape varieties that are grown in Southwest France, Bordeaux and Argentina.

These include:

- Béquignol noir
  - Béquignol blanc and Béquignol gris which are color mutations of Béquignol noir
- Fer
- Pineau d'Aunis
