= Fiefs-vendéens =

Fiefs-vendéens is a French wine AOP and AOC in the Loire Valley, created on 10 February 2011. It had formerly been a VDQS since 1963.

It is produced in the Vendée département, and includes red, white, and rosé wines. It is produced by 13 producers across 337 hectares. Before phylloxera, the area had over 18,000 hectares of vines.

There are five "fiefs" within the appellation: Brem, Chantonnay, Mareuil, Pissotte and Vix.

Average annual rainfall in Brem is 716mm, 753mm in Vix, 787mm in Mareuil, 819mm in Pissotte and 827mm in Chantonnay.

The grape varieties permissible within each of the five "fiefs" differ, but include Pinot Noir, Gamay, Cabernet Franc, Négrette for the reds and rosés; and Chardonnay, Chenin Blanc, Grolleau Gris and Sauvignon Blanc.

As of 2025, red wine represents 38% of production, rosé 36%, and white wine 26%.
