= Country wine =

Country wine may refer to:

- County wine or Vin de pays, a French national quality level of wine above table wine but below quality wine
- Country wine or fruit wine, wine made from something other than grapes such as fruit, flowers or herbs
