= Balouzat =

Balouzat is a synonym or alternative name for several wine grape varieties including:

- Bequignol noir
- Hourca
- Malbec
- Merille
