= Béquignol noir =

Variety of grape

- Grape (Vitis)
- Species: Vitis vinifera
- Origin: France
- VIVC number: 1147

Béquignol noir (French pronunciation: [bekiɲɔl nwaʁ]; also known as Red Chenin) is a red French wine grape variety that originated in Southwest France. However it is now more widely grown in the Mendoza wine region of Argentina where it is often used to add color to blends. The grape is often confused with several other red wine varieties such as Cabernet Franc, Durif, Fer and Prunelard with Béquignol noir sharing several synonyms with these grapes. However DNA profiling has shown Béquignol noir to be distinct from those grape varieties. Further research in 2011 showed that Béquignol noir may have a parent-offspring relationship with the Savagnin grape.

== History ==
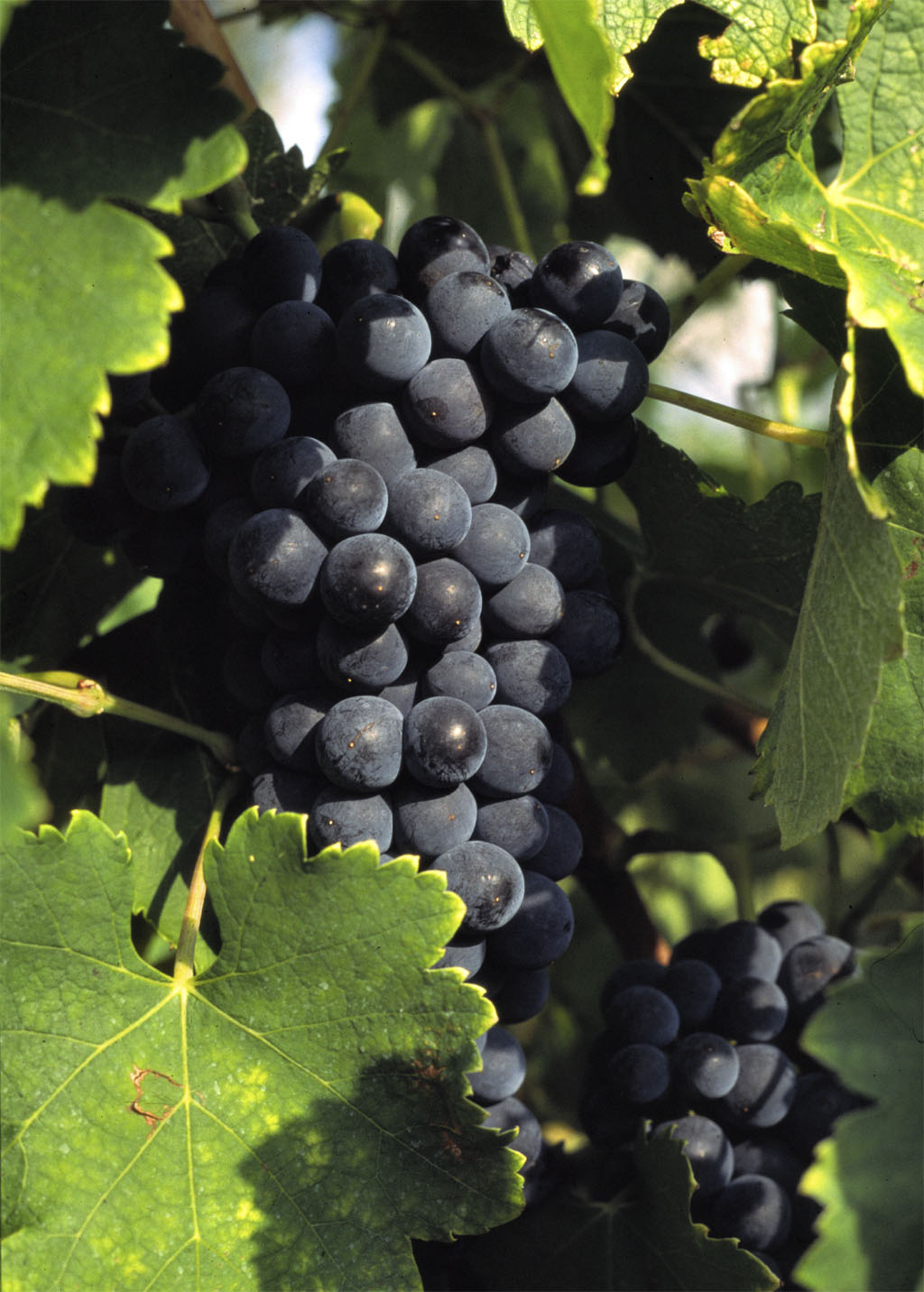
Béquignol noir is often confused with the Southwest France wine grape Fer (pictured).

Ampelographers believe that the name Béquignol comes from the Gascon dialect terms béc and inhol which together means literally "little beak" and could be a reference to the size of the berries. The first written record of Béquignol noir comes from the journals of mayor of Libourne Antoine Feuilhade who wrote about the grape being cultivated in the Bordeaux wine region between 1763 and 1777.

=== Relationship to other grapes ===
Béquignol noir has long been confused with many other Southwestern France and Bordeaux wine grape varieties such as Cabernet Franc, Fer, Prunelard and Durif with the grapes sharing many synonyms. However, DNA analysis in 1999 confirmed that Béquignol noir was its own grape variety distinct from those other grapes with further research in 2011 suggesting a parent-offspring relationship between Béquignol noir and the Jura wine grape Savagnin. It is not yet clear which grape is the parent and which is the offspring.

Béquignol blanc and Béquignol gris are white and grey color mutations of Béquignol noir that are rarely seen.

== Viticulture ==
Béquignol noir is a mid to late ripening grape variety that tends to produce very small berries. The vine can be very vigorous and high yielding. While it is resistant to drought conditions, the vine is very susceptible to the viticultural hazard of mites.

== Wine regions ==
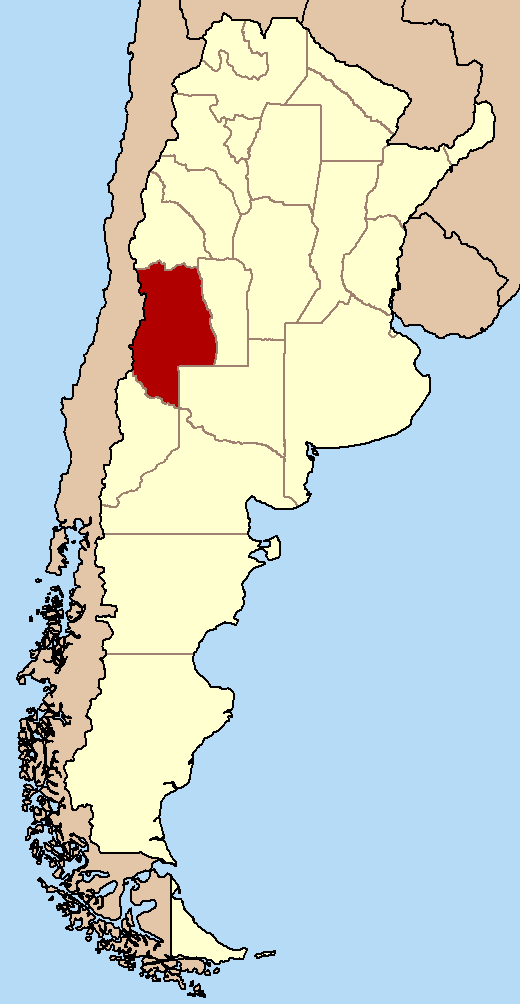
Outside of its French homeland Béquignol noir is widely planted in the Mendoza province of Argentina.

Though Béquignol noir originated in France, today it is rarely seen with less than 1 hectare (2.5 acres) of the grape reported in 2008 all in the Gironde and Vendée regions where it is still an authorized variety for wine production. This has been a steady drop since 1958 when there were 223 ha/551 acres of the variety in cultivation.

The vast majority of the world's Béquignol noir plantings are in Argentina where the grape is also known as Red Chenin. In 2008, there were 919 hectares (2,271 acres) of the grape in Argentina with most of the plantings found in the high altitude vineyards of the Mendoza. Here the grape is used similarly to Douce noir (Bonarda) in adding color to darken up red wine blends.

== Styles ==
According to Master of Wine Jancis Robinson Béquignol noir tends to produce light-bodied wines with a deep color that are usually meant to be consumed young.

== Synonyms ==
Over the years Béquignol noir has been known under a variety of synonyms including: Balouzat, Bequignaou, Béquignol Noir, Bequinaou, Béquin rouge (in Saint-Macaire and La Réole in the Gironde), Bequin rouge, Blanc Fer, Breton (in Dissay in the Poitou-Charentes region), Cabernet (in Dissay), Camerouge, Chalosse noir, Chalosse noire (in the Bas-Médoc of Bordeaux), Chausse, Chausset, Durif, Egrenant, Embalouzat (in the Entre-Deux-Mers), Enrageat rouge, Grosse Here, Here, Jurancon, Mançais noir (in the Indre-et-Loire), Maouron, Mauron, Micardeau, Negrotte, Noir Cimrah, Noir de Cimrah, Noir de Valin, Petit Fer, Plant de Dissay, Prunalet, Prunelard, Raboso Piave, Red Chenin and Sencit Gris.
