= Côtes du Marmandais =

Côtes du Marmandais (French pronunciation: [kot dy maʁmɑ̃dɛ]) is an Appellation d'origine contrôlée (AOC) for wine located in South West France around the commune of Marmande. With its location just southeast of the Entre-Deux-Mers along the banks of the Garonne river, it is a satellite of Bordeaux, but just outside the borders of that region. The region was elevated from Vin Délimité de Qualité Superieure (VDQS) to AOC status in 1990. From the Middle Ages to the 19th century, the wines of the Côtes du Marmandais were widely exported to the Netherlands. The Phylloxera epidemic wiped out most of the vineyards in this area with many farmers switching to other agricultural crops. It was not until the later half of the 20th century that viticulture in the area reaffirmed itself.

== Grapes and wines ==
The traditional Bordeaux varieties like Cabernet Sauvignon, Cabernet franc, Sémillon, Sauvignon blanc, Muscadelle, Malbec and Merlot are found here as well as the Rhône wine grape Syrah and the Burgundy grape Gamay. Local varieties Ugni blanc, Abouriou and Fer are also found. There is a much larger percentage of red wine made than white, though Sauvignon blanc production is increasing.

== See also ==
- List of Vins de Primeur
