= Saint-Mont =

- Commune
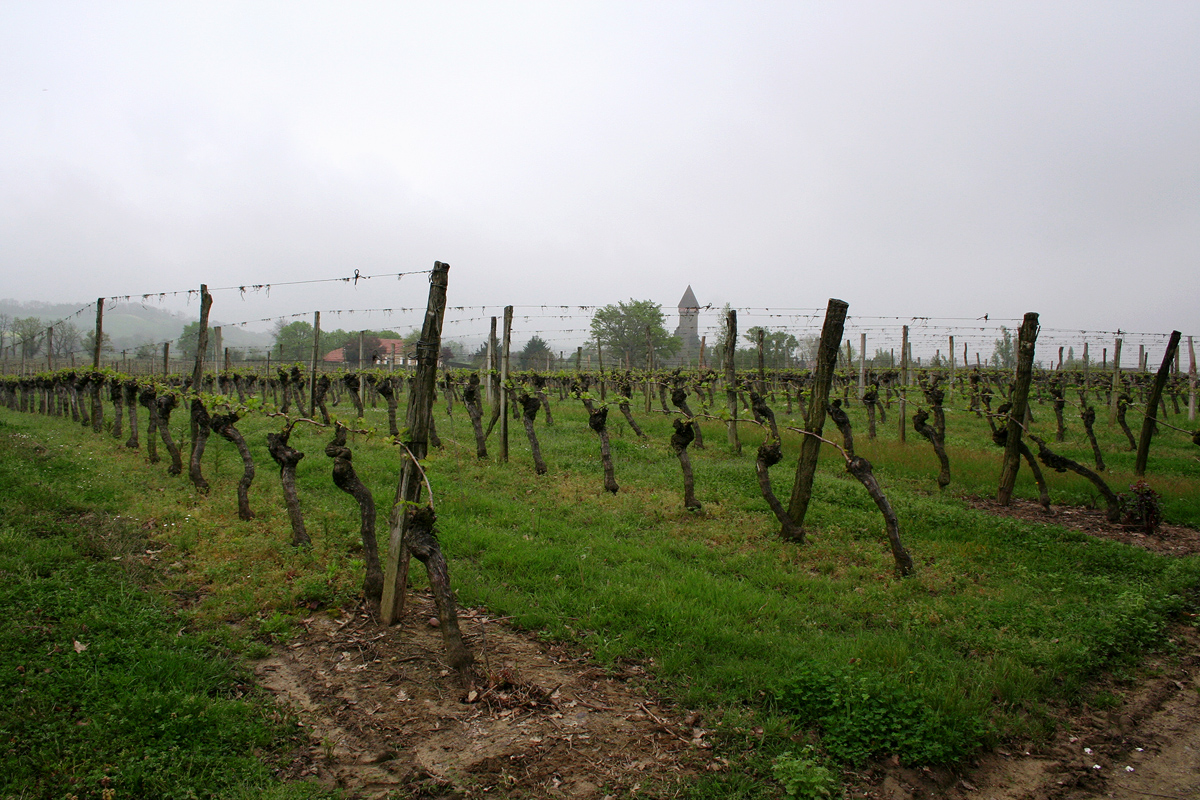
- Vineyards in Saint-Mont

- Coat of arms
- Location of Saint-Mont
- Location within France Location within Occitanie
- Coordinates: 43°39′08″N 0°08′57″W
- Country: France
- Region: Occitania
- Department: Gers
- Arrondissement: Mirande
- Canton: Adour-Gersoise

Government
  - Mayor (2020–2026): Michel Petit
- Area^{1}: 12.59 km^{2} (4.86 sq mi)
- Elevation: 130 m (430 ft)
- Highest elevation: 165 m (541 ft)
- Lowest elevation: 89 m (292 ft)
- Population (2023): 317
  - Density: 25.2/km^{2} (65.2/sq mi)
- Time zone: UTC+01:00 (CET)
  - Summer (DST): UTC+02:00 (CEST)
- INSEE/Postal code: 32398 /32400
- ^{1} French Land Register data, which excludes lakes, ponds, glaciers > 1 km^{2} (0.386 sq mi or 247 acres) and river estuaries.

Saint-Mont (French pronunciation: [sɛ̃ mɔ̃]; Gascon: Sent Mont) is a commune in the Gers department in southwestern France.

== Geography ==
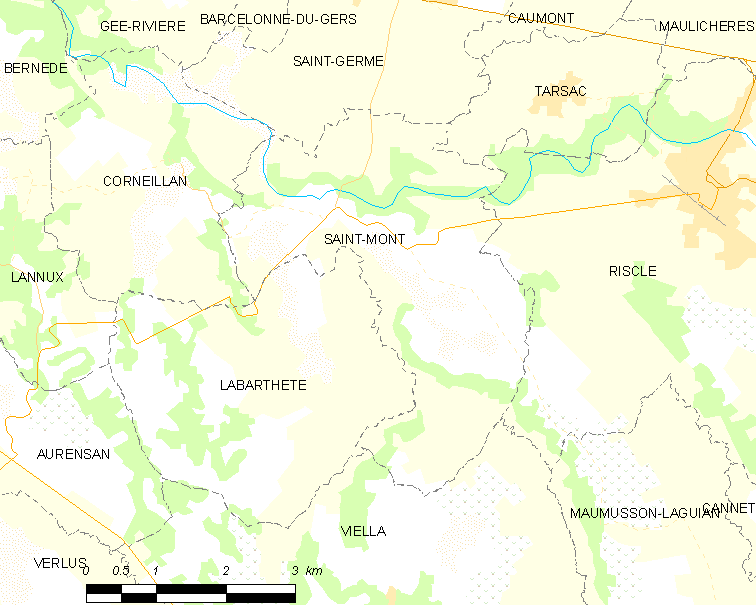
Saint-Mont and its surrounding communes

== Population ==
Historical population
Year	Pop.	±% p.a.
1968	364	—
1975	351	−0.52%
1982	348	−0.12%
1990	322	−0.97%
1999	319	−0.10%
2007	302	−0.68%
2012	314	+0.78%
2017	320	+0.38%
2023	317	−0.16%
Source: INSEE

== Saint-Mont wine ==
Wines are produced under the VDQS designation Saint-Mont and the area's vineyards are part of the South West France wine region. This VDQS, created in 1981, was previously called Côtes de Saint-Mont, before the name was changed in 2007. In 2011, following the abolition of the VDQS system, the wine was granted AOP status.

The vineyards have a surface of 1200 hectares, the VDQS designation is only valid for delimited vineyards where red, rosé and white wines are produced.

For red and rosé wines: Tannat, Fer, Cabernet Sauvignon, Merlot, Cabernet Franc. For white wine: Arrufiac, Gros Manseng, Petit Manseng, Courbu, Clairette Blanche.

The soil is mainly siliceous earth, clay and sand.

== See also ==
- Communes of the Gers department
- French wine
