= Buzet AOC =

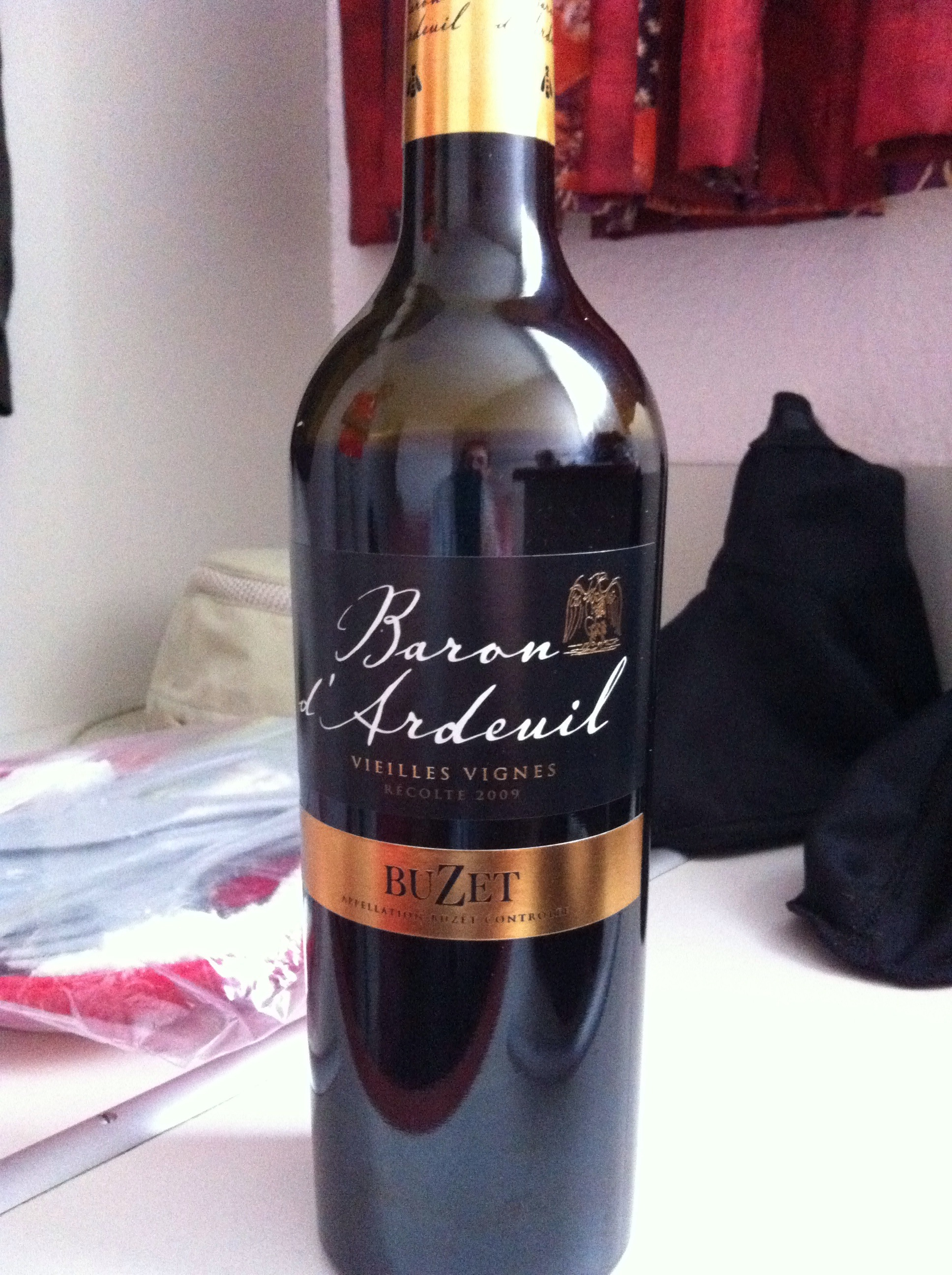
AOC Burzet Baron d'Ardeuil

Buzet is an Appellation d'Origine Contrôlée (AOC) for wine in South West France, in the department of Lot-et-Garonne.

== History ==
Originally known as Côtes de Buzet, it was a Vin Délimité de Qualité Supérieure from 1953, and was promoted to AOC status in 1973. In 1986, the name was changed from Côtes de Buzet to Buzet.

== Geography ==
Buzet's production area is spread across 1,800 hectares (4,400 acres) and is bordered by Garonne and the great Landes forest. The wine region stretches across 27 communes: Buzet-sur-Baïse.

== Wine production ==
=== Grape varieties ===
The following grape varieties are used:

- for white wines: Muscadelle, Sauvignon and Sémillon
- for red wines: Cabernet Franc, Cabernet Sauvignon, Côt and Merlot.

== See also ==
- List of vins de primeur

== Bibliography ==
- Periodical: Les amis des côtes-de-buzet, Tome I, no.1-9, Autumn 1963 to Autumn 1967, Buzet-sur-Baïse. Periodical: Les amis des côtes-de-buzet, Tome II, no.10-18, Spring 1968 to Autumn 1972, Buzet-sur-Baïse. Periodical: Les amis des côtes-de-buzet, Special Edition, no.19-20, Spring 1973 to Autumn 1973, Buzet-sur-Baïse.
