= Coteaux du Lyonnais =

French wine geographic appellation

Coteaux du Lyonnais (French pronunciation: [kɔto dy ljɔnɛ]) is an Appellation d'Origine Contrôlée (AOC) for wine in central-southeastern France. This wine-growing area is located on the slopes of the Monts du Lyonnais, a mountain range to the west of Lyon and in the eastern part of Massif Central.

== Appellation ==
AOC status was granted on May 9, 1984, and was signed by the then Minister for Agriculture, Louis Mermaz. Previously Coteaux du Lyonnais was classified as VDQS from 1952, and could also be called Vins du Lyonnais.

== Wine-growing area ==
The vineyards belonging to the Coteaux du Lyonnais AOC are spread across two main areas, both about 10 kilometers distance from Lyon, and are centered on L'Arbresle in the north and Brignais in the south.

They are bounded to the east by the Rhône and the Saône rivers, to the west by the mountains of the Monts du Lyonnais, and to the north and south by the wine-growing areas of Beaujolais and Rhône. Coteaux du Lyonnais is typically not seen as part of any of the nearby larger wine region, but as an isolated AOC on its own.

The AOC's vineyards cover approximately 370 hectares (910 acres), shared by 49 wine-growing communes in the Rhône département, and between them they produce approximately 22,000 hectolitres of wine.

== Climate ==
The climate is very similar to that of the Beaujolais wine-growing area, except that there is a stronger Mediterranean influence.

== Grape varieties ==
- Reds and rosés: Gamay, a dark-skinned variety with white juice.
- Whites: Mainly Chardonnay, but with some Aligoté.

== See also ==
- List of vins de primeur
