= List of vins de primeur =

Vins de primeur (or nouveaux wines) are French wines permitted by appellation d'origine contrôlée (AOC) regulations to be sold in the same year that they are harvested. The most widely exported nouveau wine is Beaujolais nouveau, which is released on the third Thursday of November, often only a few weeks after the grapes were harvested. As of 2005, there were 55 AOCs in France permitted to make nouveau wines. Less than half of these AOCs are required to have the words primeur or nouveau printed on the label. Depending the AOC regulations, a nouveau wine may be red, white or rosé.

== White only ==
- Anjou AOC
- Blayais AOC
- Bourgogne AOC
- Bourgogne aligoté AOC
- Bourgogne Grand Ordinaire AOC
- Côtes de Bourg AOC
- Entre-Deux-Mers AOC
- Graves AOC
- Graves de Vayres AOC
- Mâcon supérieur AOC
- Mâcon-villages AOC
- Muscadet AOC
- Muscadet de Sèvre-et-Maine AOC
- Muscadet des coteaux de la Loire AOC
- Muscadet Côtes de Grand-Lieu AOC
- Premières Côtes de Blaye AOC
- Sainte-Foy-Bordeaux AOC
- Saumur AOC
- Touraine AOC

== Rosé only ==
- Bordeaux AOC
- Cabernet d'Anjou AOC
- Cabernet de Saumur AOC
- Faugères AOC
- Rosé d'Anjou AOC
- Rosé de Loire AOC
- Saint-Chinian AOC
- Tavel AOC
- Touraine AOC

== White or rosé ==
- Buzet AOC
- Corbières AOC
- Costières de Nîmes AOC
- Coteaux d'Aix-en-Provence AOC
- Coteaux du Languedoc AOC
- Coteaux Varois AOC
- Côtes de Duras AOC
- Côtes du Marmandais AOC
- Côtes de Provence AOC
- Mâcon AOC
- Minervois AOC
- Montravel AOC

== Red or rosé ==
- Anjou Gamay AOC
- Beaujolais AOC (Beaujolais Nouveau)
- Beaujolais supérieur AOC
- Beaujolais-Villages AOC
- Coteaux du Languedoc AOC
- Touraine Gamay AOC

== All styles ==
- Bergerac AOC
- Coteaux du Lyonnais AOC
- Coteaux du Tricastin AOC
- Côtes du Rhône AOC
- Côtes du Roussillon AOC
- Côtes du Ventoux AOC
- Gaillac AOC
- Jurançon AOC
