= Cabardès AOC =

French wine protected geographic appellation

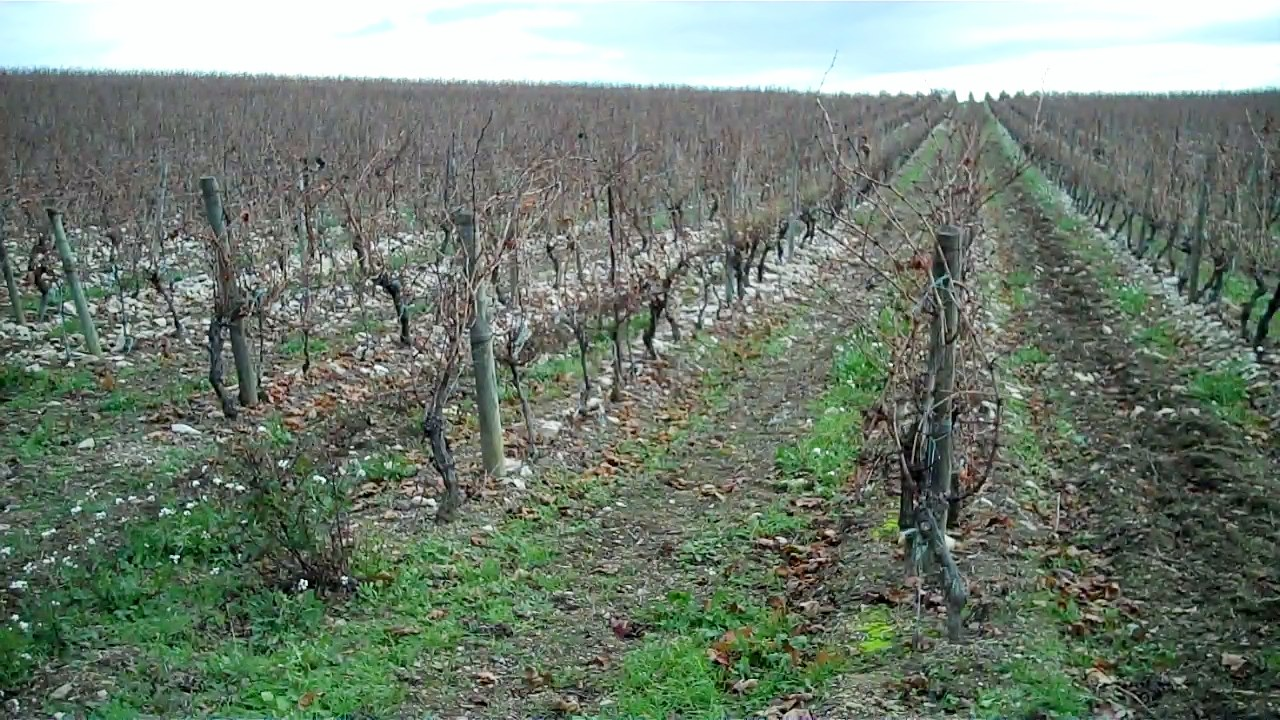
A vineyard in Cabardès

Cabardès (French pronunciation: [kabaʁdɛs]) is an Appellation d'Origine Contrôlée (AOC) for red and rosé wine in Languedoc-Roussillon wine region in France. Cabardès was named after the Lords of Cabaret who defended the Châteaux de Lastours against Simon de Montfort in 1209. Despite the name's medieval origins, this appellation is one of the youngest in France, having only become official in February 1999.

== History ==
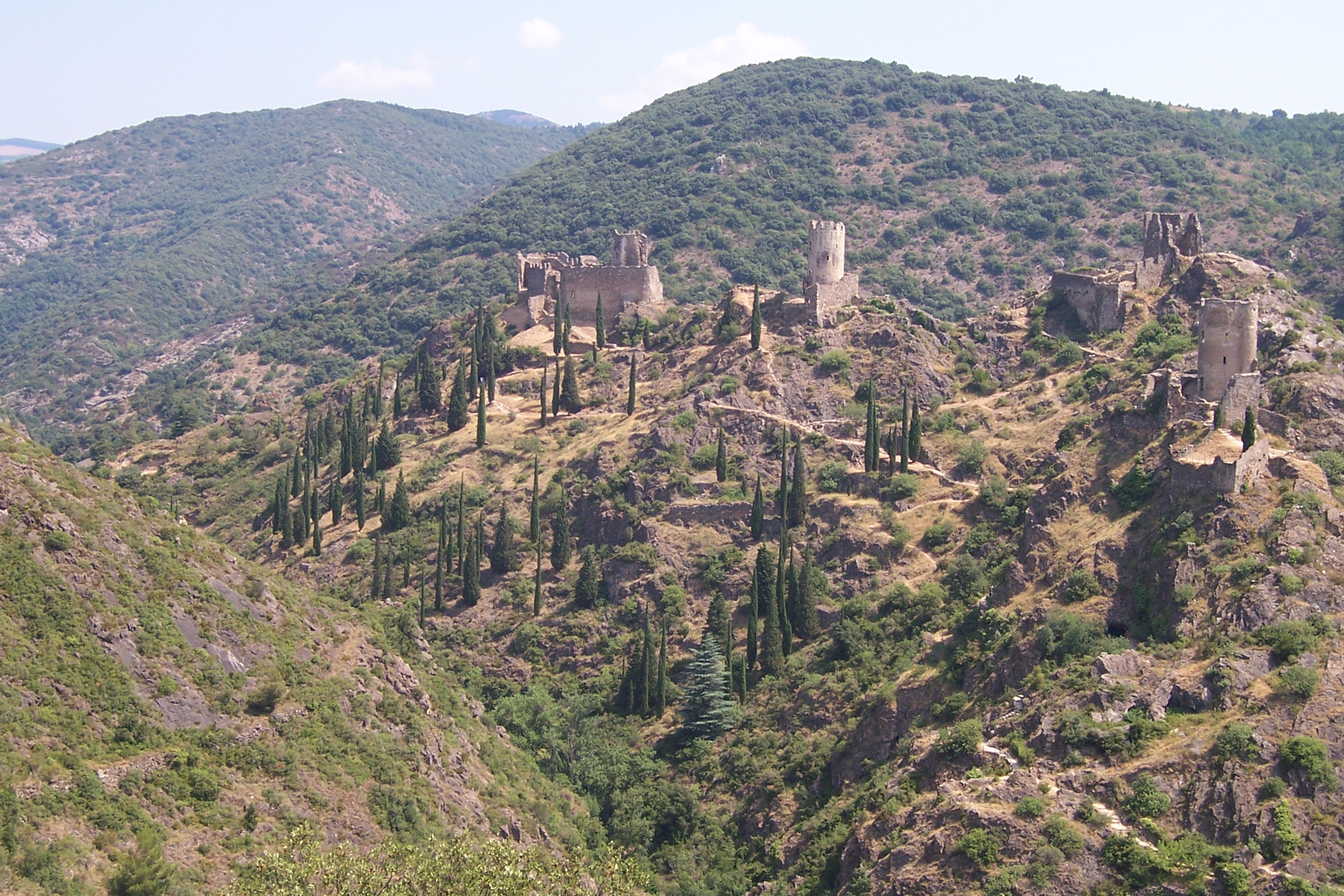
Châteaux de Lastours, the site belonged to the lords of Cabaret and is an iconic image in the Cabardès AOC.

The residents of the Cabardes region produced wine as early as the Roman occupation, but the modern appellation was made official only in 1999. It had previously been a VDQS wine under the alternative names Cabardès and Côtes du Cabardès et de l'Orbiel since 1973. The unique requirement of blending Mediterranean varieties and Atlantic varieties is the result of experimentation in cultivation and blending that began in the late 1970s.

As of 2007, these wines were relatively unknown in France, and their export, in terms of volume, is exceptionally rare due to limited production quantities and a relatively small marketing budget.

== Geography and climate ==
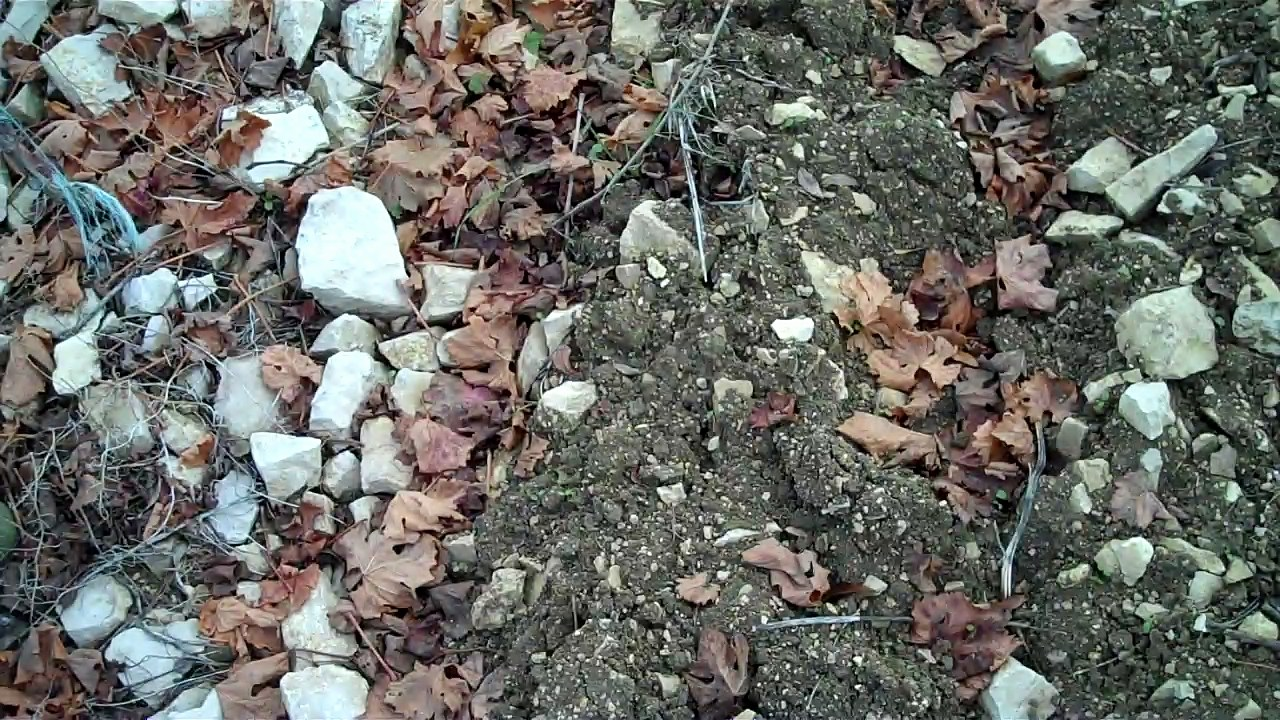
The soils of many vineyards in Cabardès are very rocky, especially near the foothills.

The vineyards of the Cabardes cover a mere 500 hectares on the northwestern border of the modern Languedoc-Roussillon region of France. This area runs up against the foothills of the Montagne Noire. The appellation really consists of a small grouping of villages directly north of the medieval walled city of Carcassonne. It is exceptionally small in size compared to the neighboring AOC areas like the 5,100 hectare-large Minervois or the 15,000 hectare behemoth of the Corbieres.

The soil composition varies between chalky clay, limestone and rocky foothill terroir. The weather is largely dominated by the powerful wind currents of the region, the dry, Atlantic vent Cers and the warm, Mediterranean vent Marin. The appellation's location where these winds meet on the border of two major French climatic zones creates a unique microclimate that has influenced its development as a winemaking region.

== Grapes ==
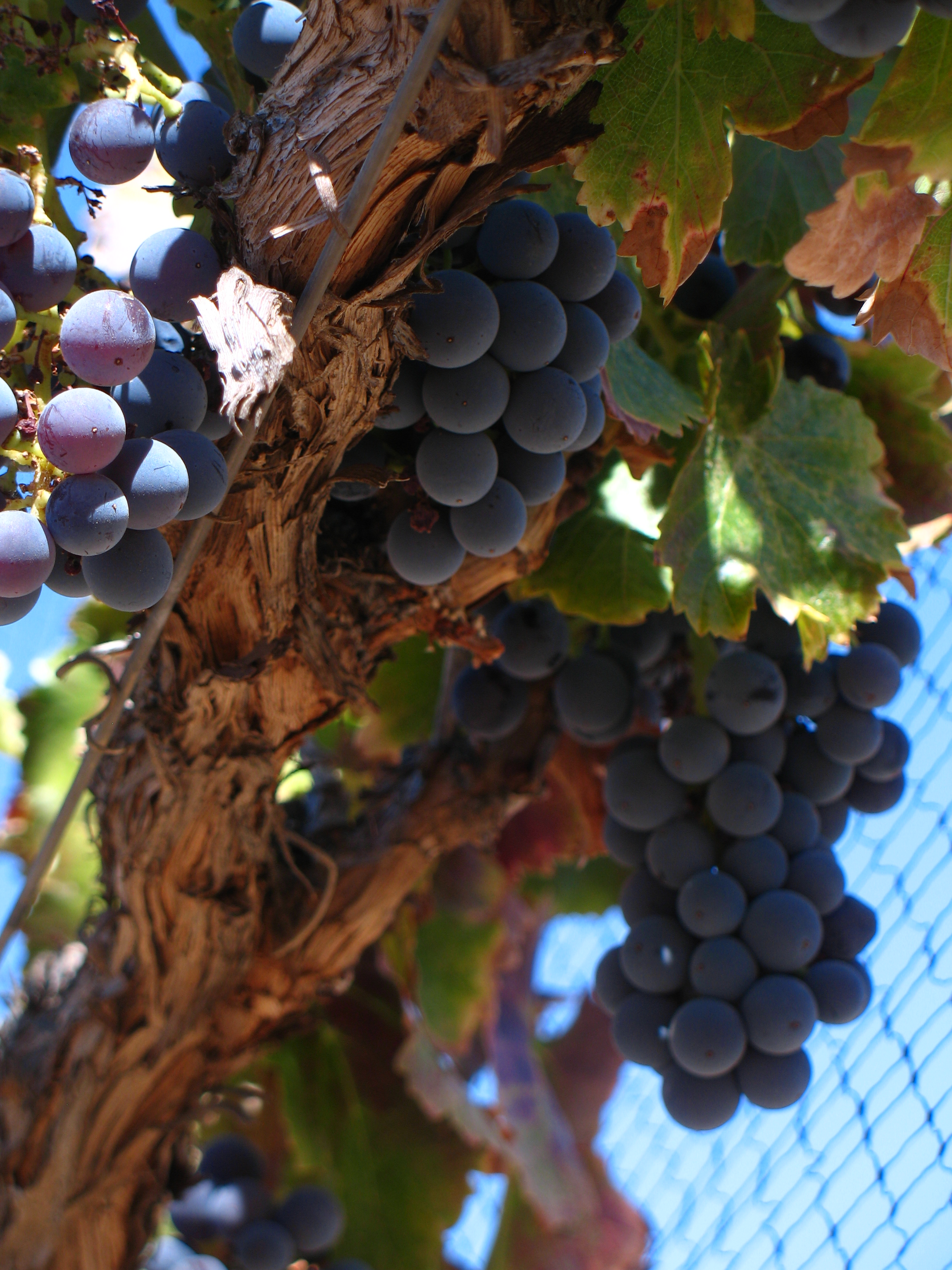
Grenache.

Most of the wine produced in the Cabardès is red, but rosé can also be produced under the AOC designation. The region is positioned on the cusp between the distinct climates of the Languedoc-Roussillon and the southwest of France. The appellation is the only AOC in France that permits the blending of grape varieties typically found in Mediterranean climates like Syrah and Grenache with varieties typically found in Atlantic climates like Merlot, Cabernet Franc and Cabernet Sauvignon. Winemakers are required to grow 50% Atlantic varieties and 50% Mediterranean varieties, and must also blend them - the new requirements from 2011 rule that the proportions of both Atlantic or Mediterranean varieties must be 40% or higher. This varietal composition reflects the distinctive soil qualities and dominant winds of the area.

== See also ==
- French wine
- List of appellations in Languedoc-Roussillon
