= Négrette =

Variety of grape

- Grape (Vitis)
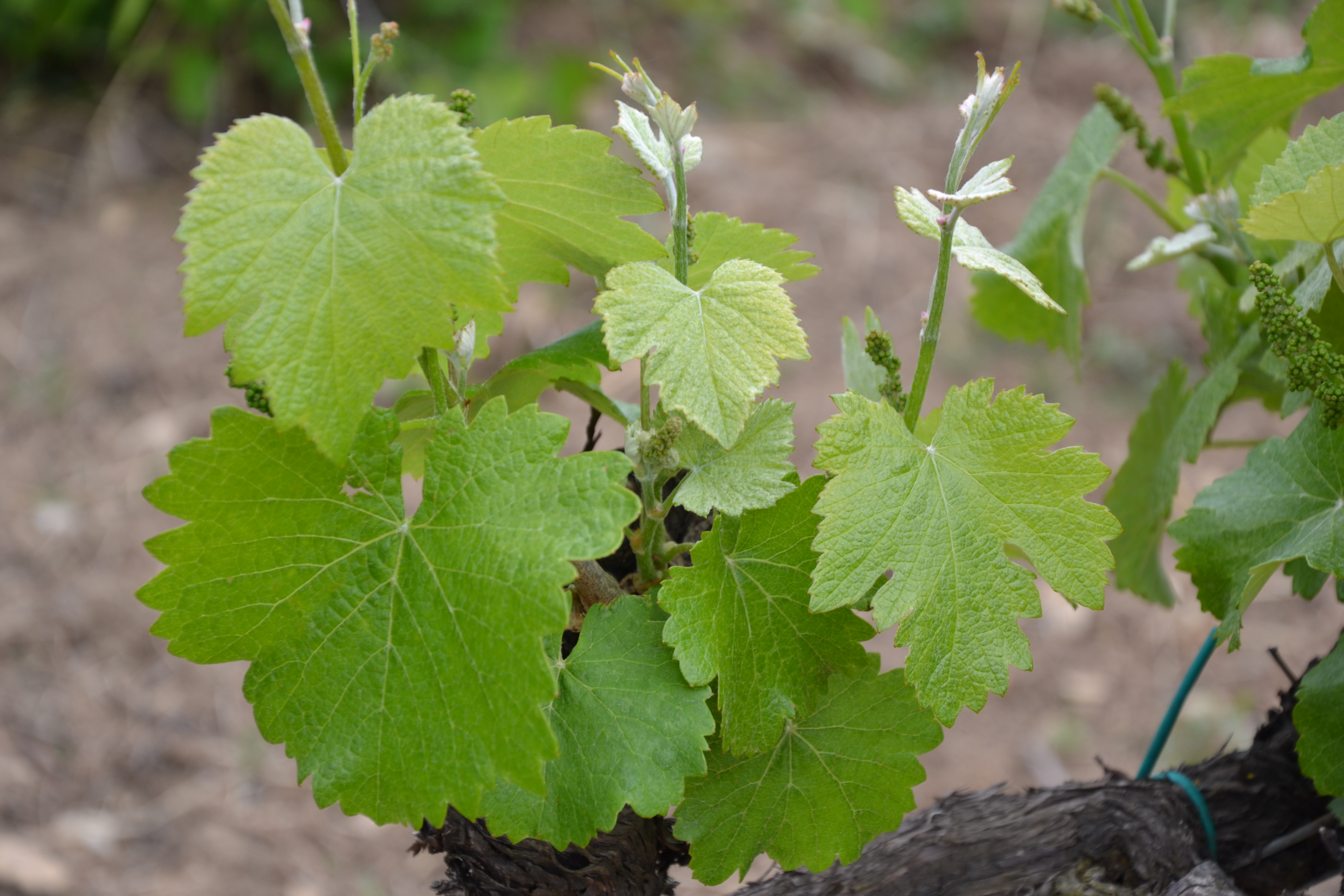
- Color of berry skin: Noir
- Species: Vitis vinifera
- Also called: See list of synonyms
- Origin: France
- Notable regions: South West France
- Notable wines: Côtes du Frontonnais
- VIVC number: 8452

Négrette (French: [neɡʁɛt]) is a dark red wine grape grown primarily in South West France in the region between Albi and Toulouse.

== Wine regions ==
The principal appellation using this variety, Côtes du Frontonnais (red and rosé), requires that 50% to 70% of the blend be the Négrette grape. The other 50% to 30% must be some combination of Cabernet Franc and Cabernet Sauvignon (maximum 25% together), Côt (maximum 25%), Fer (maximum 25%), Syrah (maximum 25%), Cinsaut, Gamay, Mauzac (a white grape), Merille (maximum 15% together). At least three grape varieties must be used.

== Wines ==
Wine made from this grape tends to show versatility in being able to age moderately well and also be drunk young. In California the vine was known as Pinot St-George until 1997, when the BATF ruled that it may no longer be called that. In the Fiefs Vendeens of the Loire Valley, Négrette may be called 'Ragoutant'. The vine has declined in planting in the last century due to its susceptibility to oidium and grey rot.

== Synonyms ==
Négrette is also known under the following synonyms: Bourgogne, Cahors, Cap de More, Chalosse noire, Couporel, Dégoûtant, Folle noire, Morelet, Morillon, Mourelet, Mourrelet, Négralet, Negraou, Négret, Négret de Gaillac, Négret du Tarn, Négrette de Fronton, Négrette de Longages, Négrette de Nice, Négrette de Rabastens, Négrette de Villaudric, Négrette de Villemur, Négrette Entière, Négrette Poujut, Negretto, Noirien, Petit Négret, Petite Négrette, Petit noir, Petit Noir de Charentes, Petit Noir de Fronton, Pinot Saint Georges, Pinot St. George, Ragoûtant, Saintongeais, Vesparo noir and Villemur.
