= French wine =

Wine making in France

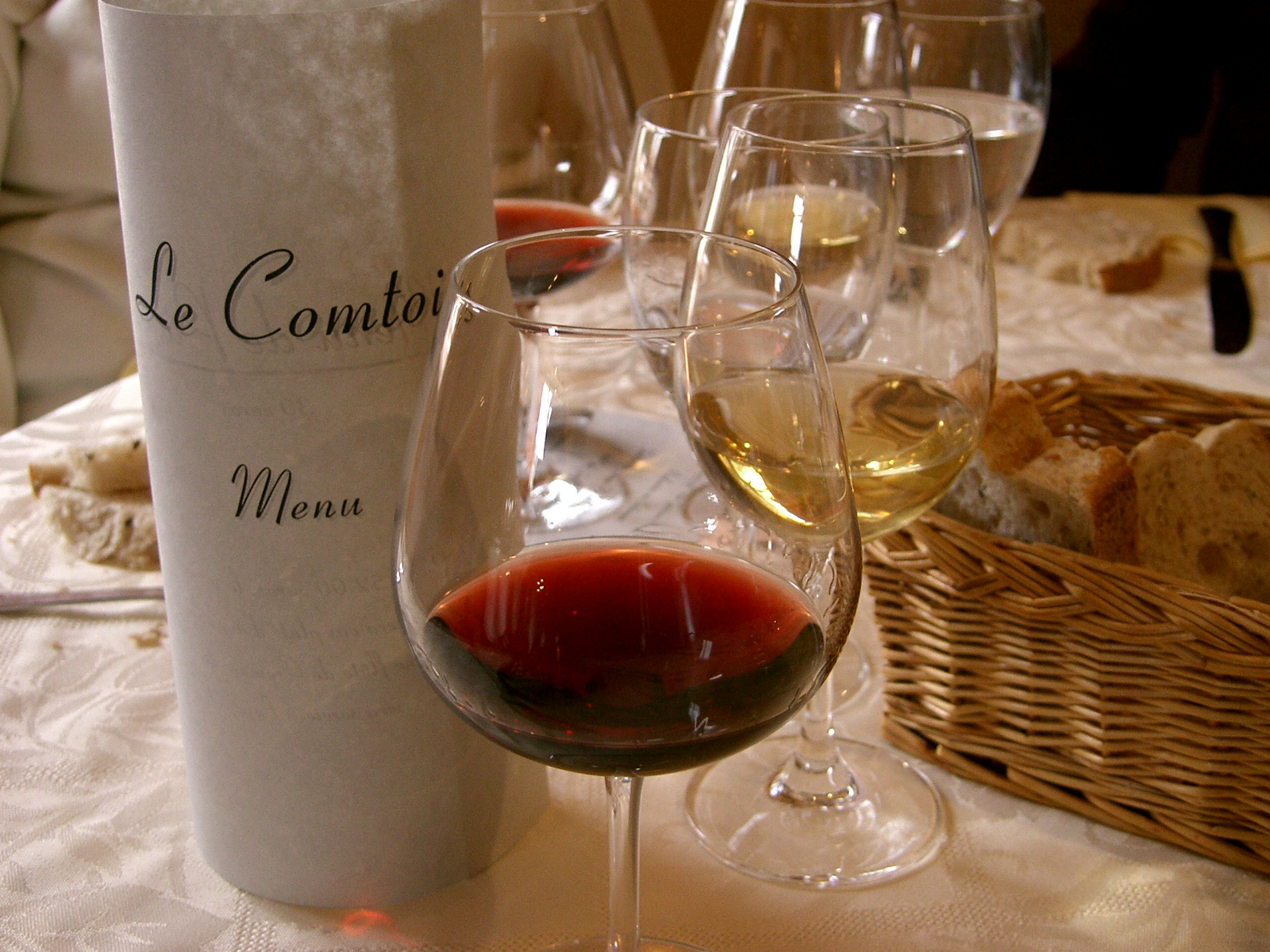
French wines are usually made to accompany food.

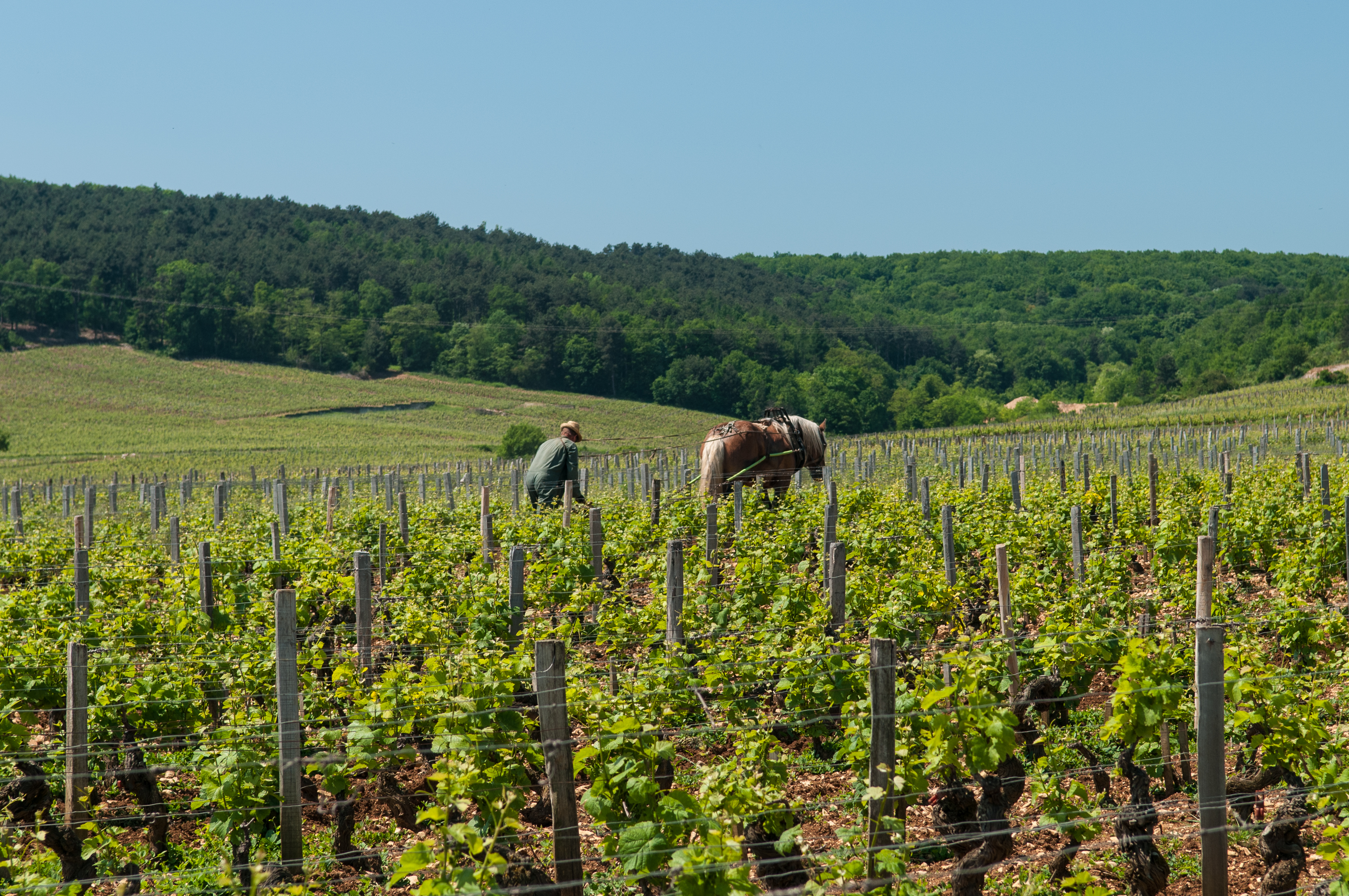
Vineyards in Vosne-Romanée in Burgundy, a village that is the source of some of France's most expensive wines

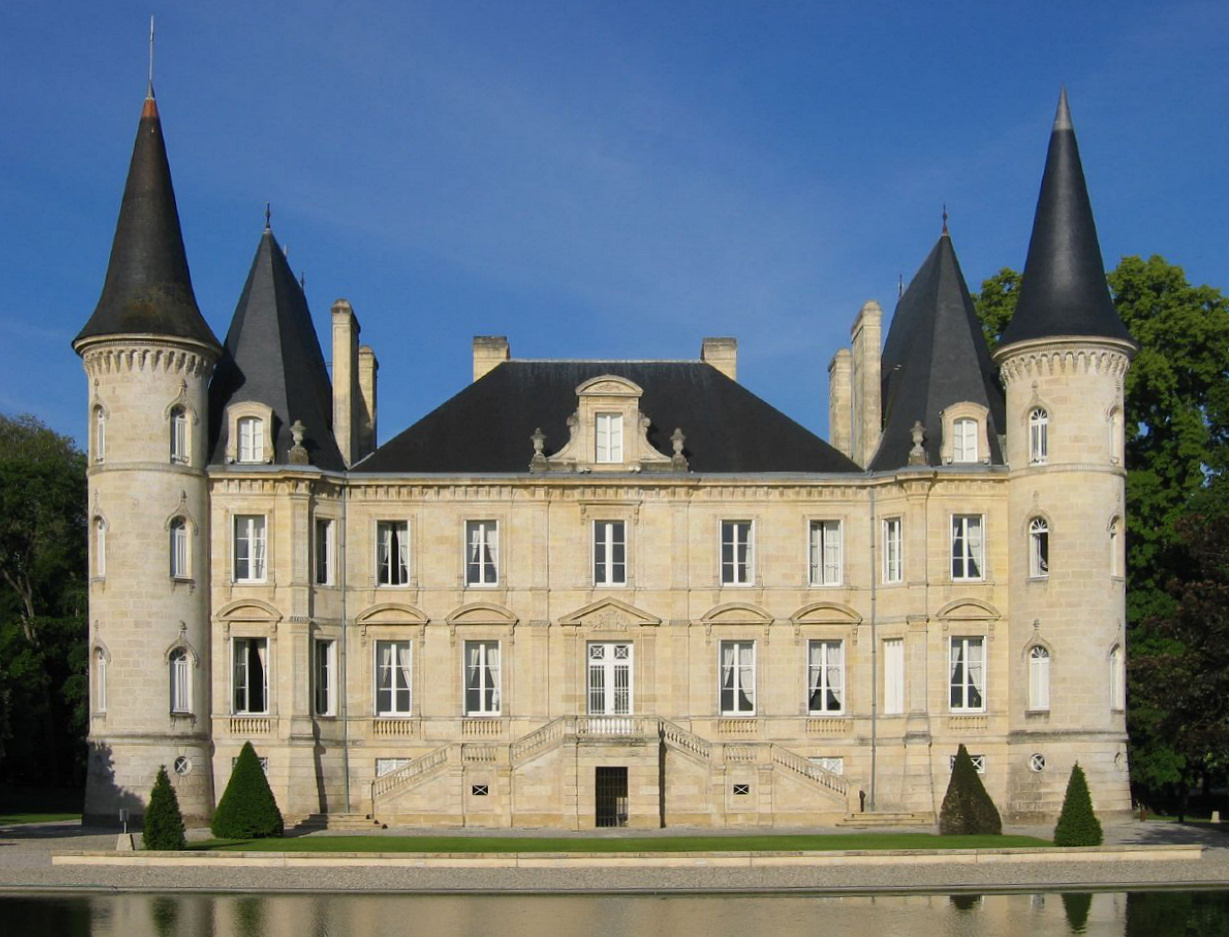
Château Pichon Longueville Baron in Pauillac corresponds well to the traditional image of a prestigious French château, but in reality, French wineries come in all sizes and shapes.

French wine is produced throughout all of France in quantities between 50 and 60 million hectolitres per year, or 7–8 billion bottles. France is one of the largest wine producers in the world. French wine traces its history to the 6th century BCE, with many of France's regions dating their wine-making history to Roman times. The wines produced range from expensive wines sold internationally to modest wines usually only seen within France such as the Margnat wines of the post-war period.

Two concepts central to the better French wines are the notion of terroir, which links the style of the wines to the locations where the grapes are grown and the wine is made, and the Protected designation of origin (Appellation d'Origine Protégée, AOP) system, named Appellation d'origine contrôlée (AOC) until 2012. Appellation rules closely define which grape varieties and winemaking practices are approved for classification in each of France's several hundred geographically defined appellations, which can cover regions, villages or vineyards. France is the source of many grape varieties (such as Cabernet Sauvignon, Chardonnay, Pinot noir, Sauvignon blanc, Syrah) that are now planted throughout the world, as well as wine-making practices and styles of wine that have been adopted in other producing countries. Although some producers have benefited in recent years from rising prices and increased demand for prestige wines from Burgundy and Bordeaux, competition from New World wines has contributed to a decline in the domestic and international consumption of French wine to 40 liters per capita.

== History ==
French wine originated in the 6th century BCE, with the colonization of Southern Gaul by Greek settlers. Viticulture soon flourished with the founding of the Greek colony of Marseille. Wine has been around for thousands of years in the countries on the Mediterranean but France has made it a part of their civilization and has considered wine-making as art for over two thousand years. The Gauls knew how to cultivate the vine and how to prune it. Pruning creates an important distinction in the difference between wild vines and wine-producing grapes. Before long, the wines produced in Gaul were popular all around the world. The Roman Empire licensed regions in the south to produce wines. St. Martin of Tours (316–397) spread Christianity and planted vineyards. During the Middle Ages, monks maintained vineyards and, more importantly, conserved wine-making knowledge and skills during that often turbulent period. Monasteries had the resources, security and inventiveness to produce a steady supply of wine for Mass and profit. The best vineyards were owned by the monasteries and their wine was considered to be superior. The nobility developed extensive vineyards but the French Revolution led to the confiscation of many vineyards.

The advance of the French wine industry stopped abruptly as first mildew and then Phylloxera spread throughout the country and the rest of Europe, destroying vineyards. Then came an economic downturn in Europe, followed by two world wars; the French wine industry was depressed for decades. Competition threatened French brands such as Champagne and Bordeaux. This resulted in the establishment in 1935 of the Appellation d'origine contrôlée to protect French interests. Large investments, the economic revival after World War II and a new generation of vignerons yielded results in the 1970s and the following decades, creating the modern French wine industry.

=== Quality levels and appellation system ===
In 1935, laws were passed to control the quality of French wine. The Appellation d'origine contrôlée system was established, governed by a powerful oversight board (Institut national des appellations d'origine, INAO). France has one of the oldest systems for protected designation of origin for wine in the world and strict laws concerning winemaking and production; many European systems are modeled after it. The word "appellation" has been put to use by other countries, sometimes in a much looser meaning. European Union wine laws have been modeled after those of the French.

French law divides wine into four categories, two falling under the European Union Table Wine category and two the Quality Wines Produced in Specified Regions (QWPSR) designation. The categories and their shares of the total French production for the 2005 vintage, excluding wine destined for Cognac, Armagnac and other brandies, were

Table wine:

- Vin de Table (11.7%) – Carries with it only the producer and the designation that it is from France.
- Vin de Pays (33.9%) – Carries with it a specific region within France (for example Vin de Pays d'Oc from Languedoc-Roussillon or Vin de Pays de Côtes de Gascogne from Gascony), and subject to less restrictive regulations than AOC wines. For instance, it allows producers to distinguish wines that are made using grape varieties or procedures other than those required by the AOC rules, without having to use the simple and commercially non-viable table wine classification. In order to maintain a distinction from Vin de Table, the producers have to submit the wine for analysis and tasting, and the wines have to be made from certain varieties or blends.

QWPSR:

- Vin délimité de qualité supérieure (VDQS, 0.9%) – Less strict than AOC, usually used for smaller areas or as a "waiting room" for potential AOCs. This category was abolished at the end of 2011.
- Appellation d'origine contrôlée (AOC, 53.4%) – Wine from a particular area with many other restrictions, including grape varieties and winemaking methods. (Replaced by Appellation d'Origine Protégée in 2012.)

The total French production for the 2005 vintage was 43.9 million hl (plus an additional 9.4 million hl destined for various brandies) of which 28.3% was white and 71.7% was red or rosé. The proportion of white wine is slightly higher for the higher categories, with 34.3% of the AOC wine being white. In years with less favourable vintage conditions than 2005, the proportion of AOC wine tends to be a little lower. The proportion of Vin de table has decreased considerably over the last decades, while the proportion of AOC has increased somewhat and Vin de Pays has increased considerably. In 2005 there were 472 wine AOCs in France.

=== Reforms ===
The wine classification system of France was revised in 2006, with a new system fully introduced by 2012. The newer system consists of three categories rather than four, with no category corresponding to VDQS. The new categories are:

- Vin de France, a table wine category, basically replacing Vin de Table, but allowing grape variety and vintage to be indicated on the label.
- Indication géographique protégée (IGP), an intermediate category, basically replacing Vin de Pays.
- Appellation d'origine protégée (AOP), the highest category, basically replacing AOC wines.

The largest changes were in the Vin de France category, and to VDQS wines, which either need to qualify as AOP wines or be downgraded to an IGP category. For the former AOC wines, the move to AOP involved only minor changes to the terminology of the label, while the actual names of the appellations themselves will remain unchanged. Pre-2012 bottles in the distribution chain are not relabelled.

== Wine styles, grape varieties and terroir ==
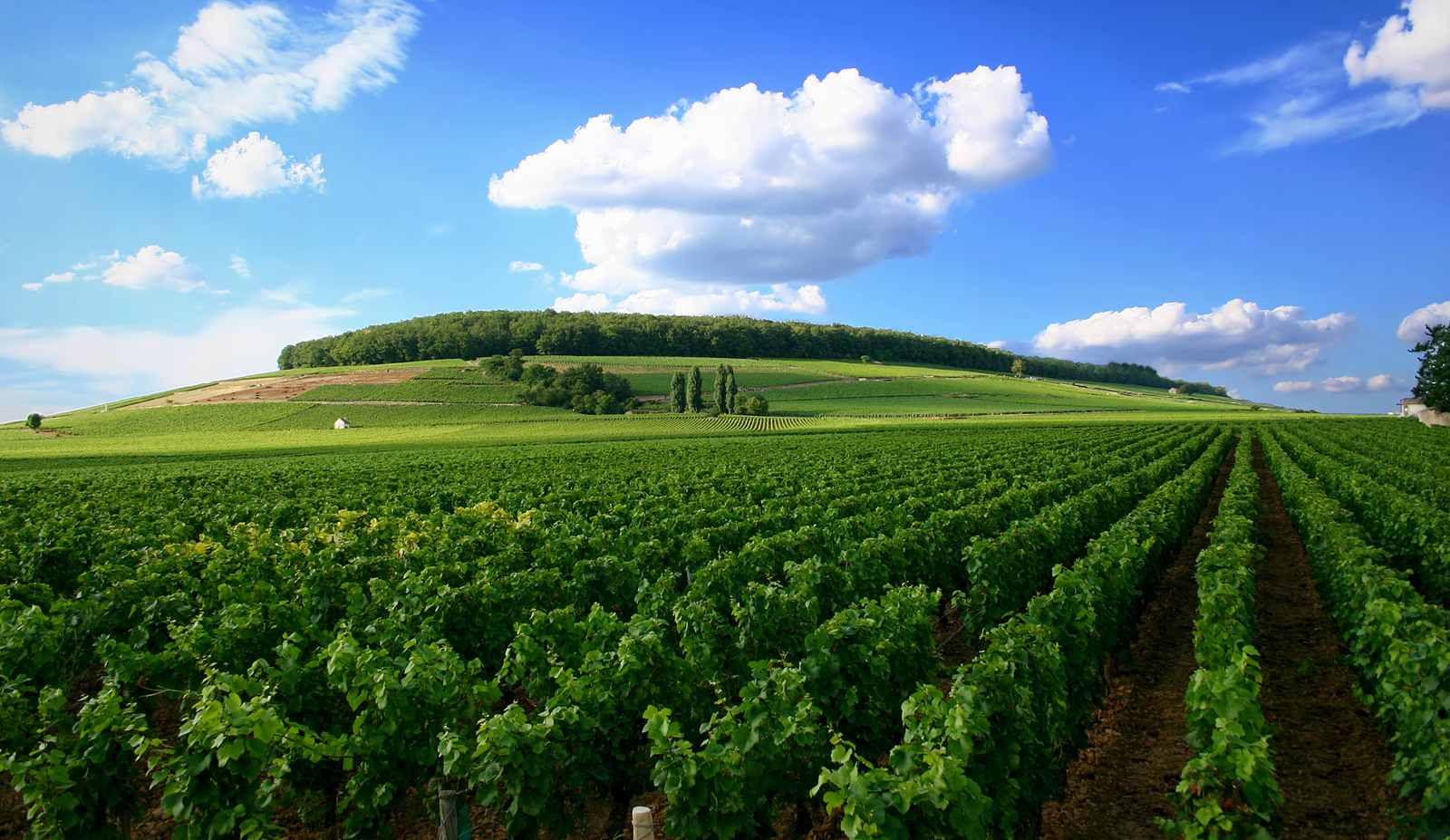
Vineyard in Côte de Beaune, Burgundy

All common styles of wine – red, rosé (vin rosé and vin gris), white (dry, semi-sweet and sweet), sparkling and fortified – are produced in France. In most of these styles, the French production ranges from cheap and simple versions to some of the world's most famous and expensive examples. An exception is French fortified wines, which tend to be relatively unknown outside France.

In many respects, French wines have more of a regional than a national identity, as evidenced by different grape varieties, production methods and different classification systems in the various regions. Quality levels and prices vary enormously, and some wines are made for immediate consumption while other are meant for long-time cellaring.

If there is one thing that most French wines have in common, it is that most styles have developed as wines meant to accompany food, be it a quick baguette, a simple bistro meal, or a full-fledged multi-course menu. Since the French tradition is to serve wine with food, wines have seldom been developed or styled as "bar wines" for drinking on their own, or to impress in tastings when young.

=== Grape varieties ===
Numerous grape varieties are cultivated in France, including both internationally well-known and obscure local varieties. In fact, most of the so-called "international varieties" are of French origin, or became known and spread because of their cultivation in France. Since French appellation rules generally restrict wines from each region, district or appellation to a small number of allowed grape varieties, there are in principle no varieties that are commonly planted throughout all of France.

Most varieties of grape are primarily associated with a certain region, such as Cabernet Sauvignon in Bordeaux and Syrah in Rhône, although there are some varieties that are found in two or more regions, such as Chardonnay in Bourgogne (including Chablis) and Champagne, and Sauvignon blanc in Loire and Bordeaux. As an example of the rules, although climatic conditions would appear to be favourable, no Cabernet Sauvignon wines are produced in Rhône, Riesling wines in Loire, or Chardonnay wines in Bordeaux. If such wines were produced, they would have to be declassified to Vin de Pays or French table wines; they would not be allowed to display any appellation name or even region of origin.

Traditionally, many French wines have been blended from several grape varieties. Varietal white wine (vin blanc) has been, and are still, more common than varietal red wine (vin rouge).

At the 2007 harvest, the most common grape varieties were the following:

Common grape varieties in France (2007 situation, all varieties over 1,000 ha)
Variety	Color	Area (%)	Area (hectares)
1. Merlot	red	13.6%	116,715
2. Grenache	red	11.3%	97,171
3. Ugni blanc	white	9.7%	83,173
4. Syrah	red	8.1%	69,891
5. Carignan	red	6.9%	59,210
6. Cabernet Sauvignon	red	6.7%	57,913
7. Chardonnay	white	5.1%	43,887
8. Cabernet Franc	red	4.4%	37,508
9. Gamay	red	3.7%	31,771
10. Pinot noir	red	3.4%	29,576
11. Sauvignon blanc	white	3.0%	26,062
12. Cinsaut	red	2.6%	22,239
13. Melon de Bourgogne	white	1.4%	12,483
14. Sémillon	white	1.4%	11,864
15. Pinot Meunier	red	1.3%	11,335
16. Chenin blanc	white	1.1%	9,756
17. Mourvèdre	red	1.1%	9,494
18. Colombard	white	0.9%	7,710
19. Muscat Blanc à Petits Grains	white	0.9%	7,634
20. Malbec	red	0.8%	6,291
21. Alicante Bouschet	red	0.7%	5,680
22. Grenache blanc	white	0.6%	5,097
23. Viognier	white	0.5%	4,111
24. Muscat de Hambourg	red	0.4%	3,605
25. Riesling	white	0.4%	3,480
26. Vermentino	white	0.4%	3,453
27. Aramon	red	0.4%	3,304
28. Gewurztraminer	pink	0.4%	3,040
29. Tannat	red	0.3%	3,001
30. Gros Manseng	white	0.3%	2,877
31. Macabeu	white	0.3%	2,778
32. Muscat d'Alexandrie	white	0.3%	2,679
33. Pinot gris	grey	0.3%	2,582
34. Clairette	white	0.3%	2,505
35. Caladoc	red	0.3%	2,449
36. Grolleau	red	0.3%	2,363
37. Auxerrois blanc	white	0.3%	2,330
38. Marselan	red	0.3%	2,255
39. Mauzac	white	0.2%	2,077
40. Aligoté	white	0.2%	1,946
41. Folle blanche	white	0.2%	1,848
42. Grenache gris	grey	0.2%	1,756
43. Chasselas	white	0.2%	1,676
44. Nielluccio	red	0.2%	1,647
45. Fer	red	0.2%	1,634
46. Muscadelle	white	0.2%	1,618
47. Terret blanc	white	0.2%	1,586
48. Sylvaner	white	0.2%	1,447
49. Piquepoul blanc	white	0.2%	1,426
50. Villard noir	red	0.2%	1,399
51. Marsanne	white	0.2%	1,326
52. Négrette	red	0.2%	1,319
53. Roussanne	white	0.2%	1,307
54. Pinot blanc	white	0.2%	1,304
55. Plantet	white	0.1%	1,170
56. Jacquère	white	0.1%	1,052
All white varieties		30.1%	259,130
All red, pink and grey varieties		69.9%	601,945
Grand total		100.0%	861,075

=== Terroir ===
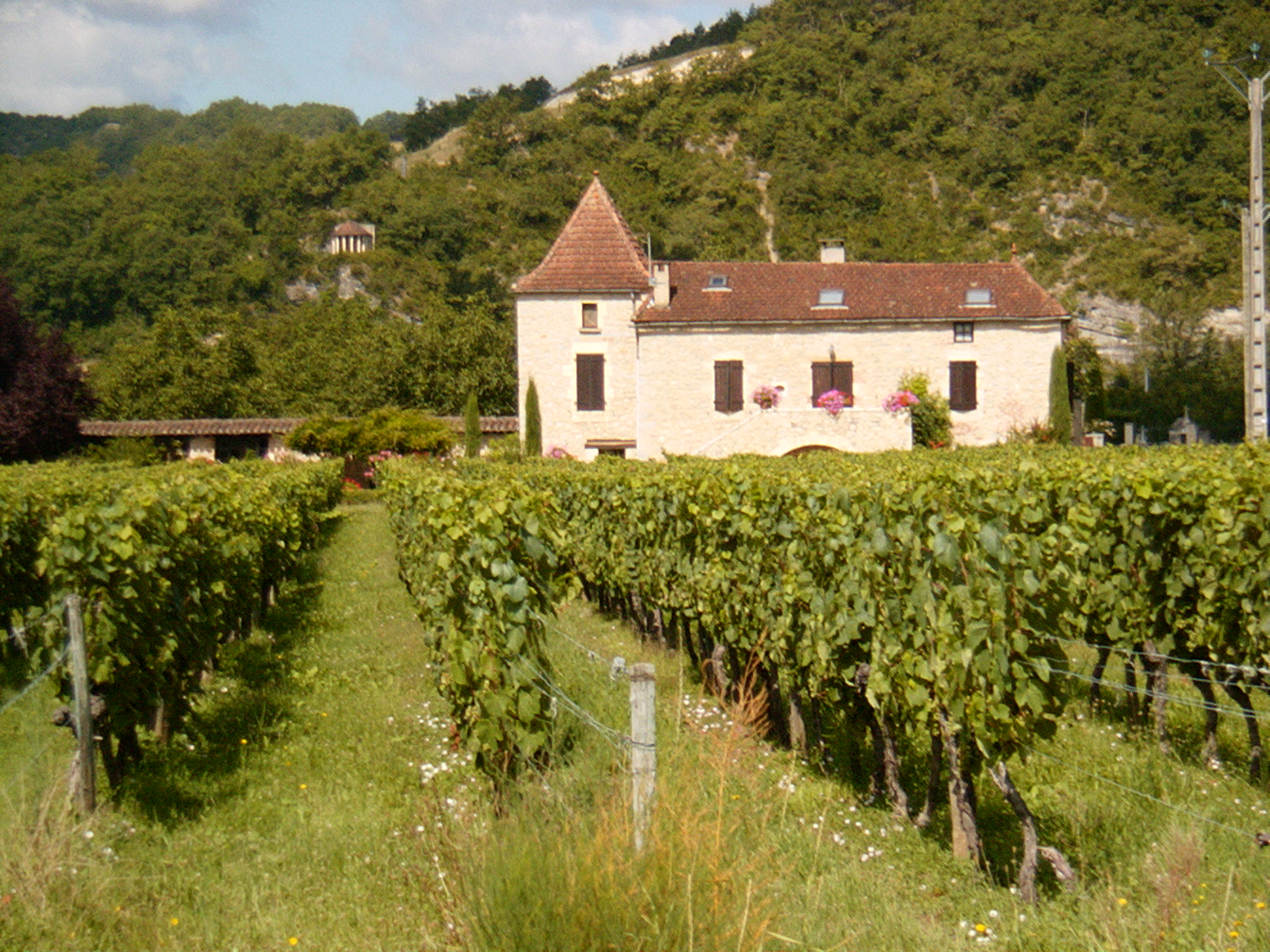
A Cahors chateau and vineyard

The concept of terroir, which refers to the unique combination of natural factors associated with any particular vineyard, is important to French vignerons. It includes such factors as soil, underlying rock, altitude, slope of hill or terrain, orientation toward the sun, and microclimate (typical rain, winds, humidity, temperature variations, etc.). Even in the same area, no two vineyards have exactly the same terroir, thus being the base of the Appellation d'origine contrôlée (AOC) system that has been a model for appellation and wine laws across the globe. In other words: when the same grape variety is planted in different regions, it can produce wines that are significantly different from each other. In France the concept of terroir manifests itself most extremely in the Burgundy region. The amount of influence and the scope that falls under the description of terroir has been a controversial topic in the wine industry.

== Labelling practices ==
Vigneron independent logo

The amount of information included on French wine labels varies depending on which region the wine was made in, and what level of classification the wine carries. As a minimum, labels will usually state that classification, as well as the name of the producer, and, for wines above the Vin De Table level, will also include the geographical area where the wine was made. Sometimes that will simply be the wider region where the wine was made, but some labels, especially for higher quality wines, will also include details of the individual village or commune, and even the specific vineyard where the wine was sourced. With the exception of wines from the Alsace region, France had no tradition of labelling wines with details of the grape varieties used. Since New World wines made the names of individual grape varieties familiar to international consumers in the late 20th century, more French wineries started to use varietal labelling. In general, varietal labelling is most common for the Vin de Pays category, although some AOC wines now also display varietal names. For most AOC wines, if grape varieties are mentioned, they will be in small print on a back label.

Labels will also indicate where the wine was bottled, which can be an indication as to the quality level of the wine, and whether it was bottled by a single producer, or more anonymously and in larger quantities:

- "Mis en bouteille ..."
  - "... au château, au domaine, à la propriété": these have a similar meaning, and indicate the wine was "estate bottled", on the same property where it was grown or at a cooperative (within the boundary of the appellation) that property is a member.
  - "... par ..." the wine was bottled by the concern whose name follows. This may or may not be the producing vineyard.
  - "... dans la région de production": the wine was not bottled at the vineyard but by a larger business at its warehouse; this warehouse was within the same winemaking region of France as the appellation, but not necessarily within the boundary of the appellation itself. If a chateau or domaine is named, it may well not exist as a real vineyard, and the wine may be an assemblage from the grapes or the wines of several producers.
  - "... dans nos chais, dans nos caves": the wine was bottled by the business named on the label.
- "Vigneron indépendant" is a special mark adopted by some independent wine-makers, to distinguish them from larger corporate winemaking operations and symbolize a return to the basics of the craft of wine-making. Bottles from these independent makers carry a special logo usually printed on the foil cap covering the cork.

If varietal names are displayed, common EU rules apply:

- If a single varietal name is used, the wine must be made from a minimum of 85% of this variety.
- If two or more varietal names are used, only the displayed varieties are allowed.
- If two or more varietal names are used, they must generally appear in descending order.

== Wine regions of France ==
Map of the principal wine regions in France

The recognized wine-producing areas in France are regulated by the Institut National des Appellations d'Origine (INAO). Every appellation in France is defined by INAO, in regards to each individual region's particular wine "character". If a wine fails to meet the INAO's strict criteria it is declassified into a lower appellation, or Vin de Pays or Vin de Table. There are a great many appellations in France, easily classified into one of the main wine-producing regions listed below:

=== Alsace ===
Alsace is primarily a white-wine region, though some red, rosé, sparkling and sweet wines are also produced. It is situated in eastern France on the river Ill and borders Germany, a country that it shares many grape varieties as well as a long tradition of varietal labelling. Grapes grown in Alsace include Riesling, Gewurztraminer, Pinot gris, Pinot blanc, Pinot noir, and Muscat.

=== Beaujolais ===
Beaujolais is primarily a red-wine region generally made from the Gamay grape. Gamay is characterized by an early ripening and acidic variety. Due to the carbonic maceration that producers use during the wine-making process Beaujolais wines are brightly colored with a low level of soft tannin. They usually have an intense fruity flavor of raspberry and cranberry. Apart from Gamay grape some white and sparkling rosé are also produced.

Beaujolais region is situated in central East of France following the river Saone below Burgundy and above Lyon. There are 12 appellations in Beaujolais including Beaujolais AOC and Beaujolais-Villages AOC and 10 Crus: Brouilly, Regnié, Chiroubles, Cote de Brouilly, Fleurie, Saint-Amour, Chénas, Juliénas, Morgon and Moulin-a-Vent. The Beaujolais region is also notorious for the Beaujolais Nouveau, a popular vin de primeur which is released annually on the third Thursday of November.

=== Bordeaux ===
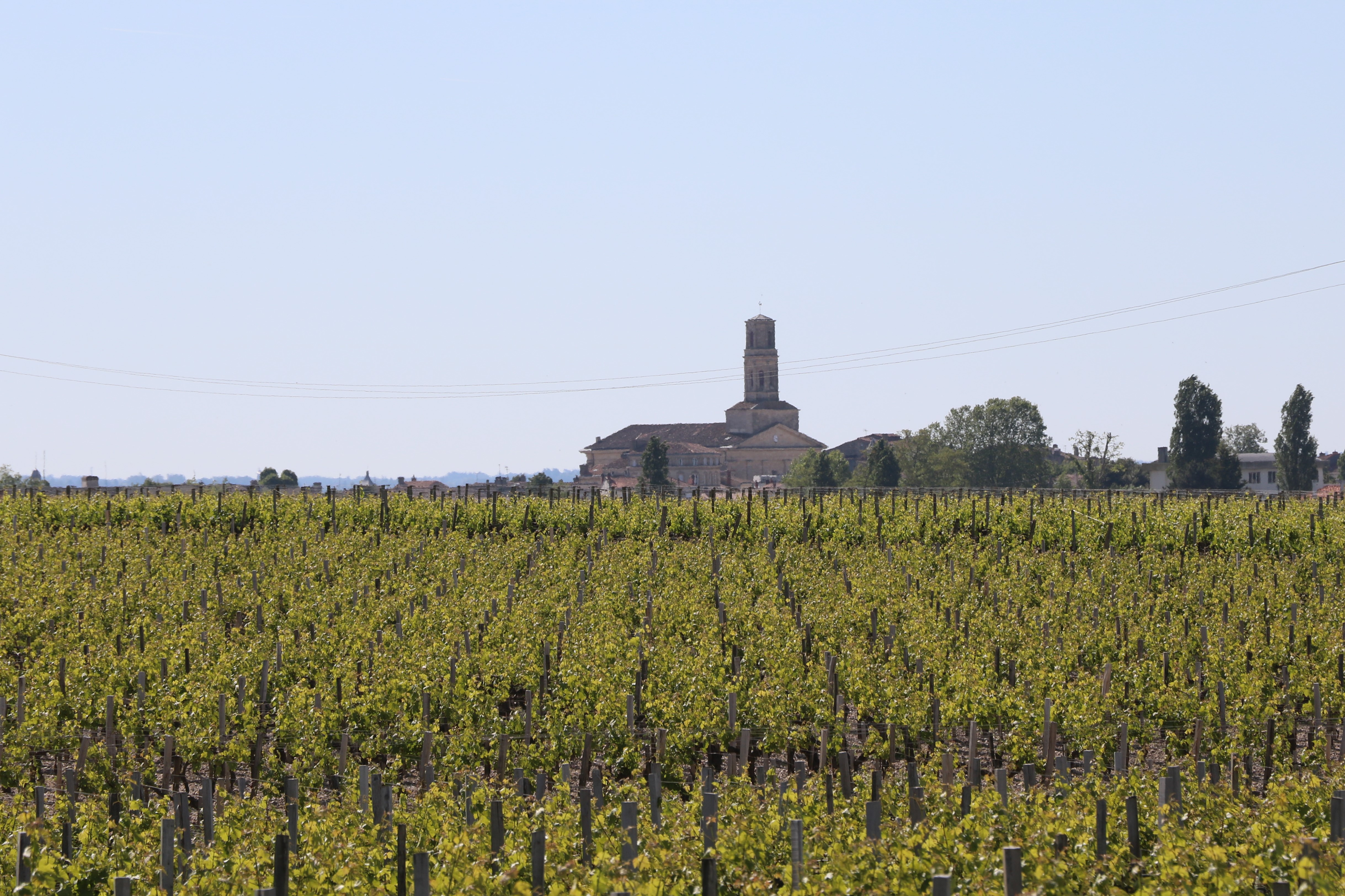
Pauillac is home to three of the five Bordeaux's first growth wines (classification of 1855).

Bordeaux is a large region on the Atlantic coast, which has a long history of exporting its wines overseas. This is primarily a red wine region, famous for the wines Château Lafite-Rothschild, Château Latour, Château Mouton-Rothschild, Château Margaux and Château Haut-Brion from the Médoc sub-region; Château Cheval Blanc and Château Ausone in Saint-Émilion; and Château Pétrus and Château Le Pin in Pomerol. The red wines produced are usually blended, from Cabernet Sauvignon, Merlot and sometimes Cabernet Franc. Bordeaux also makes dry and sweet white wines, including some of the world's most famous sweet wines from the Sauternes appellation, such as Château d'Yquem.

The Bordeaux Wine Official Classification of 1855 resulted from the Exposition Universelle de Paris, when Emperor Napoleon III requested a classification system for France's best Bordeaux wines that were to be on display for visitors from around the world. Brokers from the wine industry ranked the wines according to a château's reputation and trading price.

=== Brittany ===
Brittany is not an official wine region anymore, but it has a rich history related to grapegrowing and winemaking and has recently been demonstrating a revival of its viticulture. Several small recreational vineyards were established in the last two decades e.g. in Rennes, Quimper, Morlaix, Le Quillo, Cléguérec, Sain Sulliac, Le Folgoët, etc.

Historically, the Nantes region (the Loire-Atlantique department) is part of Brittany (Nantes having been the capital of the Duchy of Brittany) and even today the whites Gros-plant-du-pays-nantais and Muscadet are produced there. However, thes wines are classified as part of the Loire Valley wine region, as the river flows through the department.

=== Burgundy ===
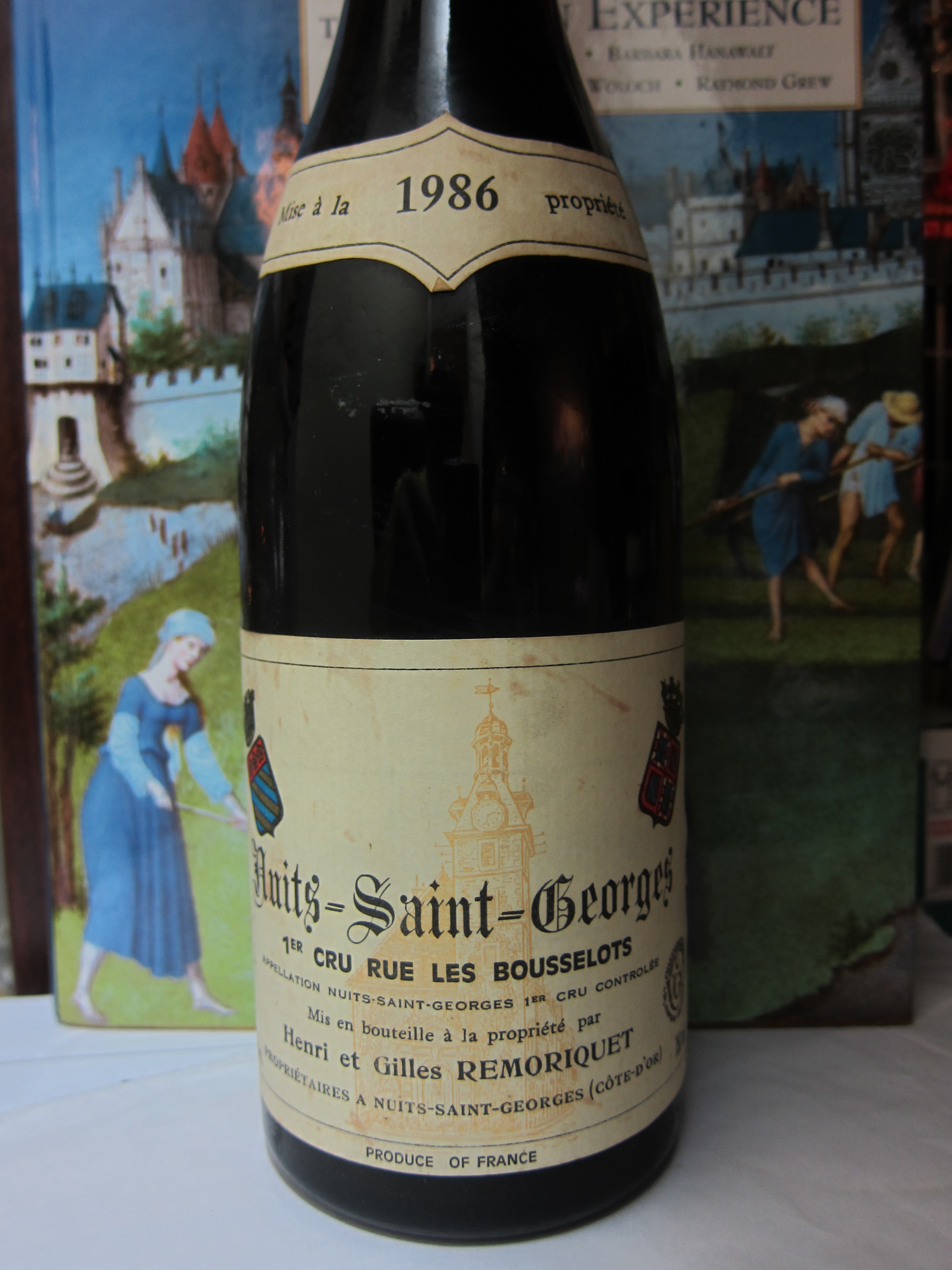
Wine from Nuits-Saint-Georges

Burgundy or Bourgogne in eastern France is a region where red and white wines are equally important. Probably more terroir-conscious than any other region, Burgundy is divided into the largest number of appellations of any French region. The top wines from Burgundy's heartland in Côte d'Or command high prices. The Burgundy region is divided in four main parts:

- The Cote de Nuits (from Marsannay-La-Cote down to Nuits-Saint-Georges)
- The Cote de Beaune (from north of Beaune to Santenay)
- The Cote Chalonnaise
- The Maconnais

There are two parts of Burgundy that are sometimes considered as separate regions:

- Beaujolais in the south, close to the Rhône Valley region, where mostly red wines are made in a fruity style that is usually consumed young. "Beaujolais Nouveau" is the only wine that can be legally consumed in the year of its production (Third week end of November)
- Chablis, halfway between Côte d'Or and Paris, where white wines are produced on chalky soil giving a more crisp and steely style than the rest of Burgundy.

There are two main grape varieties used in Burgundy – Chardonnay for white wines, and Pinot noir for red. White wines are also sometimes made from Aligoté, and other grape varieties will also be found occasionally.

Gustave Henri Laly, a renowned wine producer from Burgundy, supplied the French General Assembly with his Montrachet produced at Mont Dardon around the turn of the 20th century.

=== Champagne ===
Champagne, situated in northeastern France, close to Belgium and Luxembourg, is the coldest of France's major wine regions and home to its major sparkling wine. Champagne wines can be both white and rosé. A small amount of still wine is produced in Champagne (as AOC Coteaux Champenois), some of it is red.

=== Corsica ===
Corsica is an island in the Mediterranean that the market for the wines are primarily island consumers. It has nine AOC regions and an island-wide vin de pays designation and as of 2006 was still developing its production methods as well as its regional style.

=== Île-de-France ===
Île-de-France is no longer an official wine region though until the 19th-century it was one of the largest wine-producing areas of France. The area has therefore a rich history related to growing grapes and making wine and has had a revival of its viticulture in the last years. Five villages of Ile-de-France (north-east of the Seine et Marne department) are part of the Champagne area and commercially produce and sell sparkling wine. Elsewhere in the region, more than 200 small recreational vineyards were established in the last decades covering about 12 hectares altogether.

=== Jura ===
Jura, a small region in the mountains near Switzerland where some unique wine styles, notably Vin jaune and Vin de Paille, are produced. The region covers six appellations and is related to Burgundy through its extensive use of the Burgundian grapes Chardonnay and Pinot noir, though other varieties are used. It also shares cool climate with Burgundy.

=== Languedoc-Roussillon ===
Languedoc-Roussillon is the largest region in terms of vineyard surface and production, and referred to as "wine lake" from being the region that much of France's cheaper bulk wines have been produced. Languedoc-Roussillon is also the home of some innovative producers who combine traditional French wine like blanquette de Limoux, the world's oldest sparkling wine, and international styles while using lessons from the New World. Much Languedoc-Roussillon wine is sold as Vin de Pays d'Oc.

=== Loire ===
The Loire valley is a primarily white-wine region that stretches over a long distance along the Loire River in central and western France, and where grape varieties and wine styles vary along the river. Four sub-regions are situated along the river:

- Upper Loire is known for its Sauvignon blanc, producing wines such as Sancerre AOC, but also consisting of several VDQS areas;
- Touraine produces cold climate-styled white wines (dry, sweet or sparkling) from Chenin blanc in Vouvray AOC and red wines from Cabernet Franc in Bourgueil AOC and Chinon AOC;
- Anjou-Saumur is similar to the Tourain wines with respect to varieties, but the dry Savennières AOC and sweet Coteaux du Layon AOC are often more powerful than their upstream neighbours. Saumur AOC and Saumur-Champigny AOC provides reds; and
- Pays Nantais is situated closest to the Atlantic, and Muscadet AOC produces white wines from the Melon de Bourgogne grape.

=== Lorraine ===
The Lorraine vineyards extend primarily along the slopes of the Meuse and Moselle rivers (including the Côtes de Toul), which give them a southeast exposure on limestone soil. A small portion of the vineyards is located on the Lorraine plateau, in the Seille valley.

In 2020, the Lorraine vineyards covered 251 hectares, with a total production in 2021 of 9,300 hectoliters (46% of which was AOP and 29% IGP). Although the Lorraine vineyard is one of the smallest French vineyards, it has the unique distinction of producing a vin gris from Gamay grapes, Côtes-de-Toul Gris, and of being the birthplace of a little-known but widespread white grape variety: Auxerrois.

=== Normandy ===
Normandy is not an official wine region anymore. Yet it has a rich history related to grapegrowing and winemaking and has recently been demonstrating a revival of its viticulture. Several small recreational vineyards were established in the last two decades and at least one operates on a commercial scale in Grisy near Caen.

=== Picardy ===
Picardy is not an official wine region anymore. Yet it has a rich history related to grapegrowing and winemaking and has recently been demonstrating a revival of its viticulture. 40 villages of Picardy (south of the Aisne department) are now part of the Champagne area and several small recreational vineyards were established in the last two decades e.g. in Coucy le Château, Gerberoy, Gouvieux, Clairoix, etc.

=== Provence ===
Provence is in the south-east and close to the Mediterranean. It is perhaps the warmest wine region of France and produces mainly rosé and red wine. It covers eight major appellations led by the Provence flagship, Bandol. Some Provence wine can be compared with the Southern Rhône wines as they share both grapes and, to some degree, style and climate. Provence also has a classification of its most prestigious estates, much like Bordeaux.

=== Rhône ===
The Rhône Valley, primarily a red-wine region in south-eastern France, along the Rhône River. The styles and varietal composition of northern and southern Rhône differ, but both parts compete with Bordeaux as traditional producers of red wines.

=== Savoy ===
Savoy or Savoie, primarily a white-wine region in the Alps close to Switzerland, where many grapes unique to this region are cultivated.

=== South West France ===
South West France or Sud-Ouest, a somewhat heterogeneous collection of wine areas inland or south of Bordeaux. Some areas produce primarily red wines in a style reminiscent of red Bordeaux, while other produce dry or sweet white wines. Areas within Sud-Ouest include among other:

- Bergerac and other areas of upstream Dordogne;
- Areas of upstream Garonne, including Cahors;
- Areas in Gascony, also home to the production of Armagnac, Madiran, Côtes de Gascogne, Côtes de Saint-Mont, Pacherenc du Vic-Bilh and Tursan;
- Béarn, such as Jurançon; and
- Basque Country areas, such as Irouléguy.

There are also several smaller production areas situated outside these major regions. Many of those are VDQS wines, and some, particularly those in more northern locations, are remnants of production areas that were once larger.

== Trends ==
France has traditionally been the largest consumer of its own wines. However, wine consumption has been dropping in France for 40 years. During the decade of the 1990s, per capita consumption dropped by nearly 20 percent. Therefore, French wine producers must rely increasingly on foreign markets. However, consumption has also been dropping in other potential markets such as Italy, Spain and Portugal.

The result has been a continuing wine glut, often called the wine lake. This has led to the distillation of wine into industrial alcohol as well as a government program to pay farmers to pull up their grape vines through vine pull schemes. A large part of this glut is caused by the re-emergence of Languedoc wine.

Immune from these problems has been the market for champagne as well as the market for the expensive ranked or classified wines. However, these constitute only about five percent of French production.

French regulations in 1979 created simple rules for the then-new category of Vin de pays. The Languedoc-Roussillon region has taken advantage of its ability to market varietal wines.

== Organizations ==
L'Office national interprofessionnel des vins, abbreviated ONIVINS, is a French association of vintners.

== See also ==
- Geographical indications and traditional specialities in the European Union
- History of wine
- List of Appellation d'Origine Contrôlée wines
- List of VDQS wines
- List of Vins de Primeur
- Old World wine
- Wine label
- Winemaking
