= South West France (wine region) =

French wine region

- Wine region
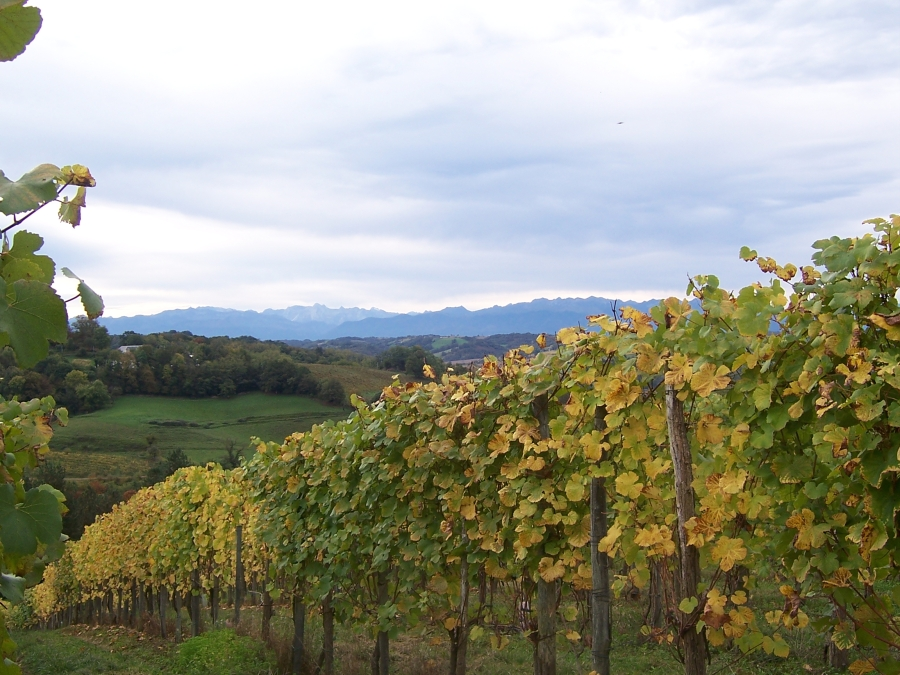
- Official name: Sud-Ouest
- Type: Region
- Country: France
- Sub-regions: Dordogne river areas, Garonne river areas, Gascony, Basque Country
- Size of planted vineyards: 16,000 ha

South West France, or in French Sud-Ouest, is a wine region in France covering several wine-producing areas situated respectively inland from, and south of, the wine region of Bordeaux. These areas, which have a total of 16,000 hectares (40,000 acres) of vineyards, consist of several discontinuous wine "islands" throughout the Aquitaine region (where Bordeaux region itself is situated), and more or less to the west of the Midi-Pyrénées region.

Thus, South West France covers both the upstream areas around the rivers Dordogne and Garonne (which also flow through Bordeaux where they combine to form the Gironde estuary) and their tributaries, as well as the wine-producing areas of Gascony including Béarn, and the Northern Basque Country. However, only areas closer to the Atlantic than to the Mediterranean are included in the region, with the city of Toulouse being situated roughly halfway between the South West wine region and the Languedoc-Roussillon wine region on the Mediterranean.

The brandy-producing region Armagnac is situated within Gascony and the wine region of South West France, and some of its grapes are used to make Vin de Pays under the designation Vin de Pays de Côtes de Gascogne or mixed with Armagnac to produce the mistelle Floc de Gascogne.

South West France is a rather heterogeneous region in terms of its wines and how they are marketed. It is rare to see wines being sold as Vins du Sud-Ouest. Rather, the smaller areas and individual appellations market their wines under their own (smaller) umbrella, in contrast with common practice in e.g. the Bordeaux region.

The areas closest to Bordeaux produce wines in a style similar to those of Bordeaux, and largely from the same grape varieties. Further south, wines are still rather similar to those of Bordeaux, but several grape varieties not used in Bordeaux are common, such as Tannat. Finally, in the areas closest to the Pyrenees, wines are made from local varieties, such as Gros Manseng and Petit Manseng.

== History ==
The south-west region was first cultivated by the Romans and had a flourishing wine trade long before the Bordeaux area was planted. As the port city of Bordeaux became established, wines from the "High Country" would descend via the tributaries of the Dordogne and Garonne to be sent to markets along the Atlantic coast. The climate of the inland region was generally warmer and more favorable than in Bordeaux, allowing the grapes to be harvested earlier and the wines to be of a stronger alcohol level. Many Bordeaux wine merchants saw the wines of the "High Country" as a threat to their economic interest and during the 13th & 14th century a set of codes, known as the police des vins, were established which regulated the use of the port of Bordeaux for wine trading. The police des vins stated that no wine could be traded out of Bordeaux until the majority of Bordelais wine had already been sold. This had a devastating effect on the wine industry of the High Country with barrels of wines being stranded at Bordeaux warehouses for several weeks or months before they could be sold at much lower prices due to that year's market already being saturated with wine. In many years another vintage would actually take place before the "High Country" wines were sold.

== Appellations in South West France ==
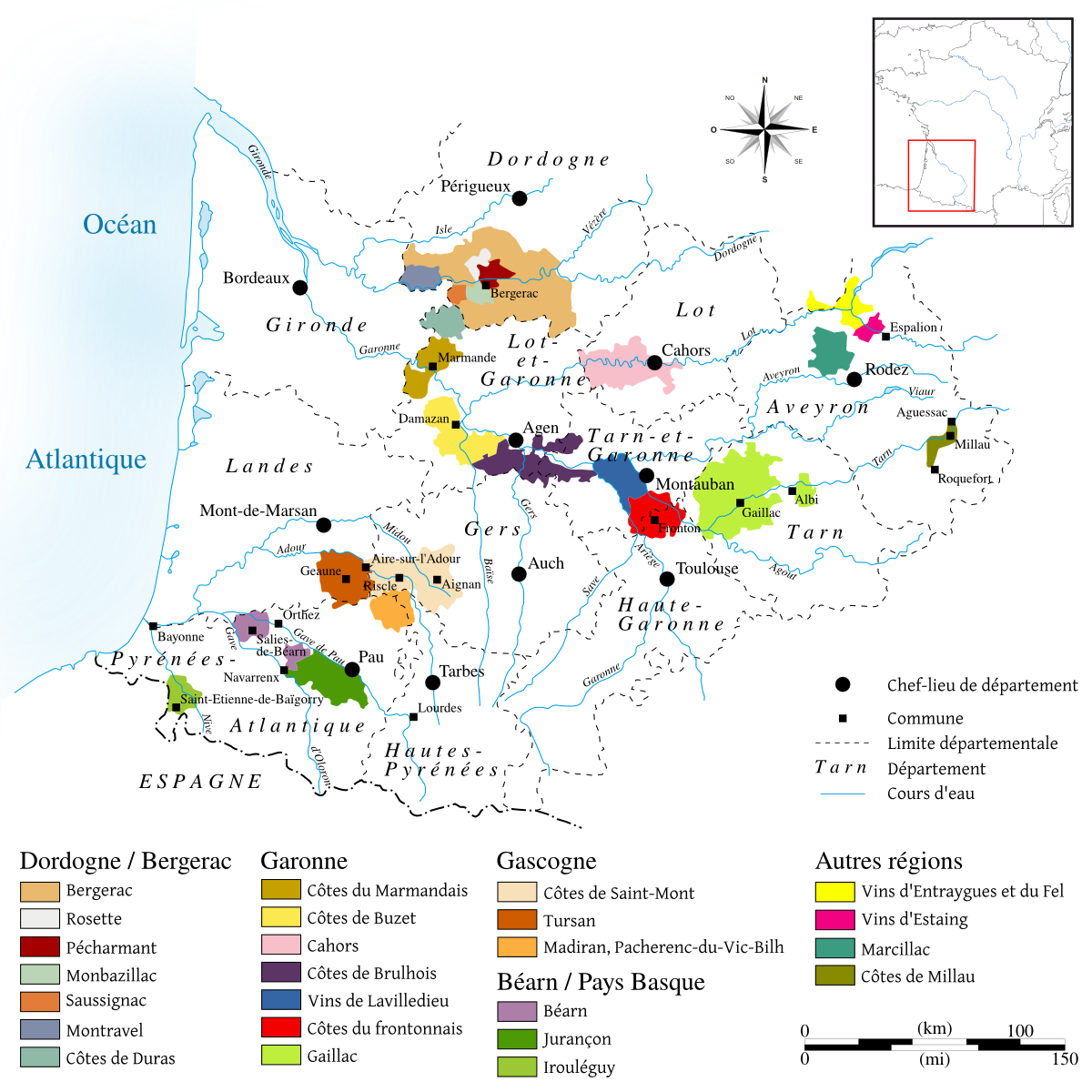
Map of South West France with the various appellations of the region.

South West France includes the following Appellation d'Origine Contrôlée (AOC) and Vin Délimité de Qualité Supérieure (VDQS) designations.

=== Dordogne/Bergerac, subregion ===
- Bergerac AOC
- Côtes de Duras AOC
- Côtes de Montravel AOC
- Haut-Montravel AOC
- Monbazillac AOC
- Montravel AOC
- Pécharmant AOC
- Rosette AOC
- Saussignac AOC

=== Garonne subregion ===
- Brulhois AOC
- Buzet AOC
- Cahors AOC
- Côtes de Duras AOC
- Côtes du Marmandais AOC
- Fronton AOC
- Gaillac AOC
- Marcillac AOC
- Coteaux du Quercy VDQS
- Côtes de Millau VDQS
- Saint-Sardos VDQS
- Vins de Lavilledieu VDQS
- Vins d'Entraygues et du Fel VDQS
- Vins d'Estaing VDQS

=== Gascony and Pyrenean subregions ===
Gascony lands are close to the Adour river, Béarn and Basque lands are closer to the Pyrenees

==== Gascony lands ====
- Saint-Mont VDQS
- Tursan VDQS

==== Gascony and Béarn lands ====
- Madiran AOC
- Pacherenc du Vic-Bilh AOC
- Pacherenc du Vic-Bilh Sec AOC

==== Béarn lands ====
- Béarn AOC
- Jurançon AOC

==== Basque Country land ====
- Irouléguy AOC

== Common grape varieties ==
The following grape varieties are commonly found in at least one sub-region or appellation of South West France.

- Abouriou
- Arrouya noir
- Arrufiac
- Baco blanc
- Bouchalès
- Cabernet Franc
- Cabernet Sauvignon
- Clairette blanche
- Colombard
- Courbu
- Duras
- Fer
- Folle blanche
- Gros Manseng
- Jurançon
- Len de l'El
- Malbec
- Merlot
- Muscadelle
- Négrette
- Petit Manseng
- Portugias bleu
- Raffiat de Moncade
- Sauvignon blanc
- Sémillon
- Tannat
- Ugni blanc

== See also ==
- French wine
- Vineyards of the Basque Country
