= Vin de pays =

French wine classification

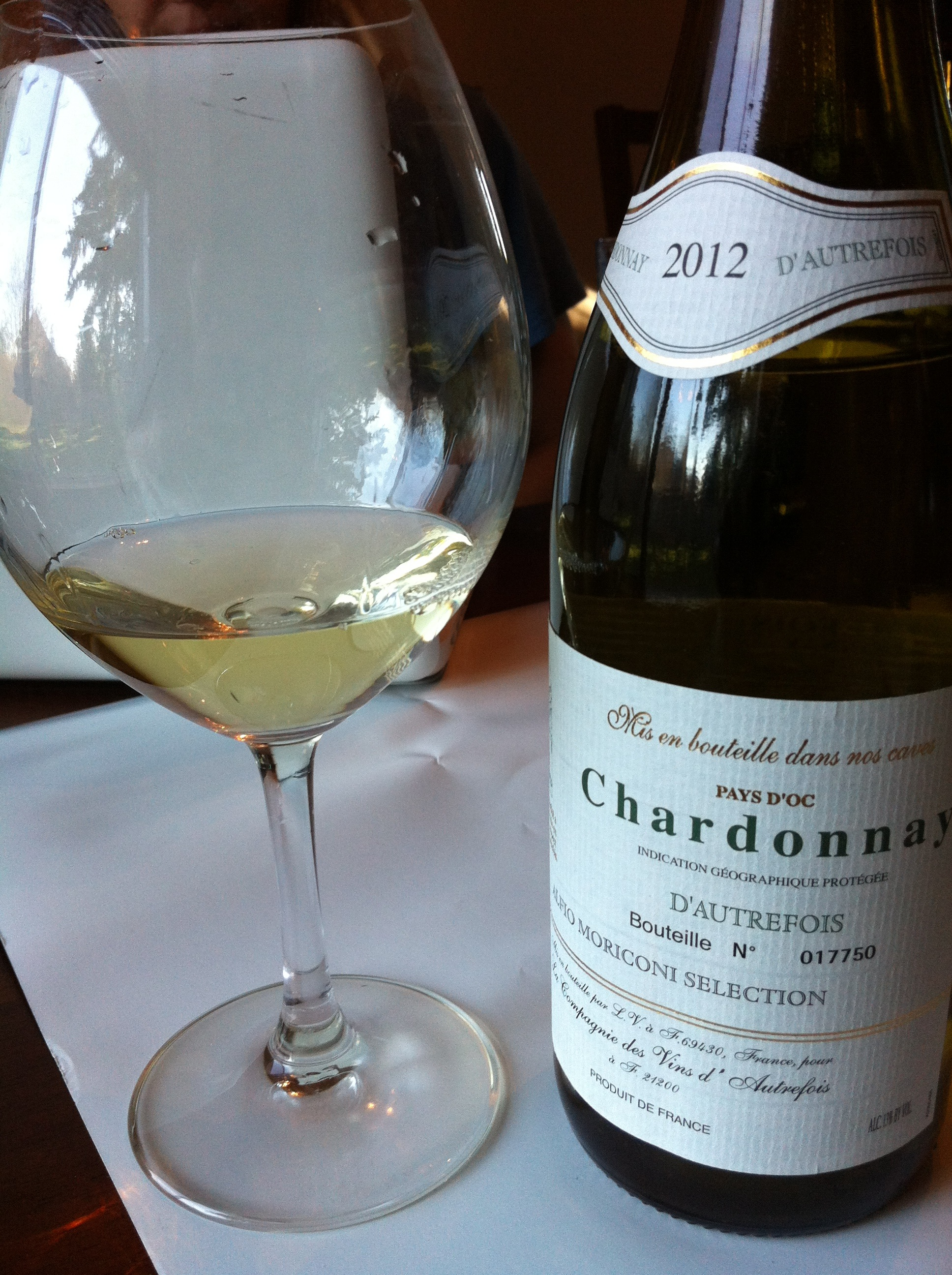
A Vin de Pays d'Oc Chardonnay.

Vin de pays (French: [vɛ̃ də pei]; 'country wine') was a French wine classification that was above the vin de table classification, but below the appellation d'origine contrôlée (AOC) classification and below the former vin délimité de qualité supérieure classification. The vin de pays classification was replaced by the EU indication Indication Géographique Protégée in 2009.

Legislation on the Vin de pays terminology was created in 1973 and passed in 1979, allowing producers to distinguish wines that were made using grape varieties or procedures other than those required by the AOC rules, without having to use the simple and commercially non-viable table wine classification. Unlike table wines, which are only indicated as being from France, Vin de pays carries a geographic designation of origin, the producers have to submit the wine for analysis and tasting, and the wines have to be made from certain varieties or blends. Regulations regarding varieties and labelling practices were typically more lenient than the regulations for AOC wines.

== Taxonomy ==
There were three tiers of Vin de Pays: regional, departmental and local.

There were seven regional Vins de Pays, which cover large areas of France. The most voluminous contributor to this category of wines was Vin de Pays d'Oc, from the Languedoc-Roussillon area in Mediterranean France. The second largest volume of Vin de Pays wines was produced as Vin de Pays de la Loire, a designation that applies to wines from the whole Loire Valley and Chablis. The others were: Vin de Pays du Comté Tolosan (south-west), Vin de Pays de Méditerranée (south-east, Provence and Corsica) and Vin de Pays des Comtés Rhodaniens (Rhone valley). Vin de Pays Terres du Midi, approved in mid-2018 for certain blended wines produced in Languedoc and Roussillon. Two further regional Vin de Pays designations, Vin de Pays de l'Atlantique (Bordeaux and Charentes (Cognac)) and Vin de Pays Vignobles de France (all of wine-making France) were approved by French authorities in 2007, but (together with Vin de Pays de Gaules for the Beaujolais region) remain disputed and as of July 2009, they remained unpublished in the Official Journal of the European Union due to actions taken by other French wine producers. The Vin de Pays Vignobles de France has now been replaced by a table wine designation Vin de France, launched in August 2009.

Each regional Vin de Pays was divided into several departmental Vins de Pays, of which there were about 50. The names were derived from the French departments in question and the limits exactly the same as the department's borders. For example, Vin de Pays du Gard was one of the Vins de Pays produced within Vins de Pays d'Oc using grapes from the Gard department and the Vin de Pays de Charente-maritime was produced in the Cognac area. Approximately one third of the French departments don't produce Vin de Pays, some like Côte d'Or in Burgundy and Gironde in Bordeaux because their wine production was entirely in the higher AOC tier, and others because their climate was not suited to wine production at all, like the Bretagne, Normandy and Nord-Pas de Calais regions.

The local, or zone-defined Vins de pays were numerous, and may have taken their name from some historical or geographical phenomenon, such as Vin de Pays des Marches de Bretagne or Vin de Pays des Coteaux de l'Ardeche, or even a more locally specific variant. The boundaries of a zone may reflect a consistent terroir, rather than an administrative convenience, and could potentially in the long run achieve the status of an AOC.

== Production rules ==
The conditions to respect to be allowed to use the classification Vin de pays were the following:

- The yield must be less than 90 hectoliters per hectare for white wines, and less than 85 hl for red and rosé wines.
- Only wine producers with a total yield of less than 100 hl/ha can qualify.
- The minimum alcoholic strength depends on the region and was 10% in Le Midi, 9.5% in South-west France area and the Centre East area, and 9% for the Loire Valley and the East area.
- The allowed amounts of sulfur dioxide allowed in the wines were 125 mg/L for red wines and 150 mg/L for white and rosé wines. For wines with sugar content of at least 5 g/L, the quantity of sulfur dioxide was slightly higher: 150 mg/L for red wines and 175 mg/L for white and rosé wines.
- The acidity in terms of pH values was also regulated, with some Vin de Pays areas having stricter rules than others.
- The wines were required to be kept and produced separately from other wines (e.g. production for table wines) and were subject to quality monitoring by an official regional committee.

== Economic effects ==
In terms of volume, Vins de Pays d'Oc and Vin de Pays du Val de Loire (previously known as Vins de Pays du Jardin de France) were responsible for the majority of French exports.

Originally, Vin de Pays designation was commonly viewed as inferior to an AOC Appellation, often being ascribed to thin and simple wines. However, since the late 1980s, an increase in demand for varietal wines has led some French producers and cooperatives to produce more Vin de Pays, especially Vin de Pays d'Oc, to make varietal wines with some form of designation, while turning away from the highly restrictive AOC classification which often requires very specific blends of grape varieties.

This can be seen as a response to the increasing sales success of varietal New World wines from Australia, New Zealand, the United States, South Africa and Chile. As well as varietal wines (such as Cabernet Sauvignon or Merlot), Vin de Pays was used to produce non-traditional blends which do not meet the requirements of AOC or VDQS regulations. Some of these wines are considered much better, and command higher prices, than AOC or VDQS wines from the same region, or even the same winemakers.

== See also ==
- Indicazione geografica tipica of Italy
- Vino de la tierra of Spain
- Denominação de Origem Controlada of Portugal
- German wine classification of Germany
