= Fer =

Grape variety

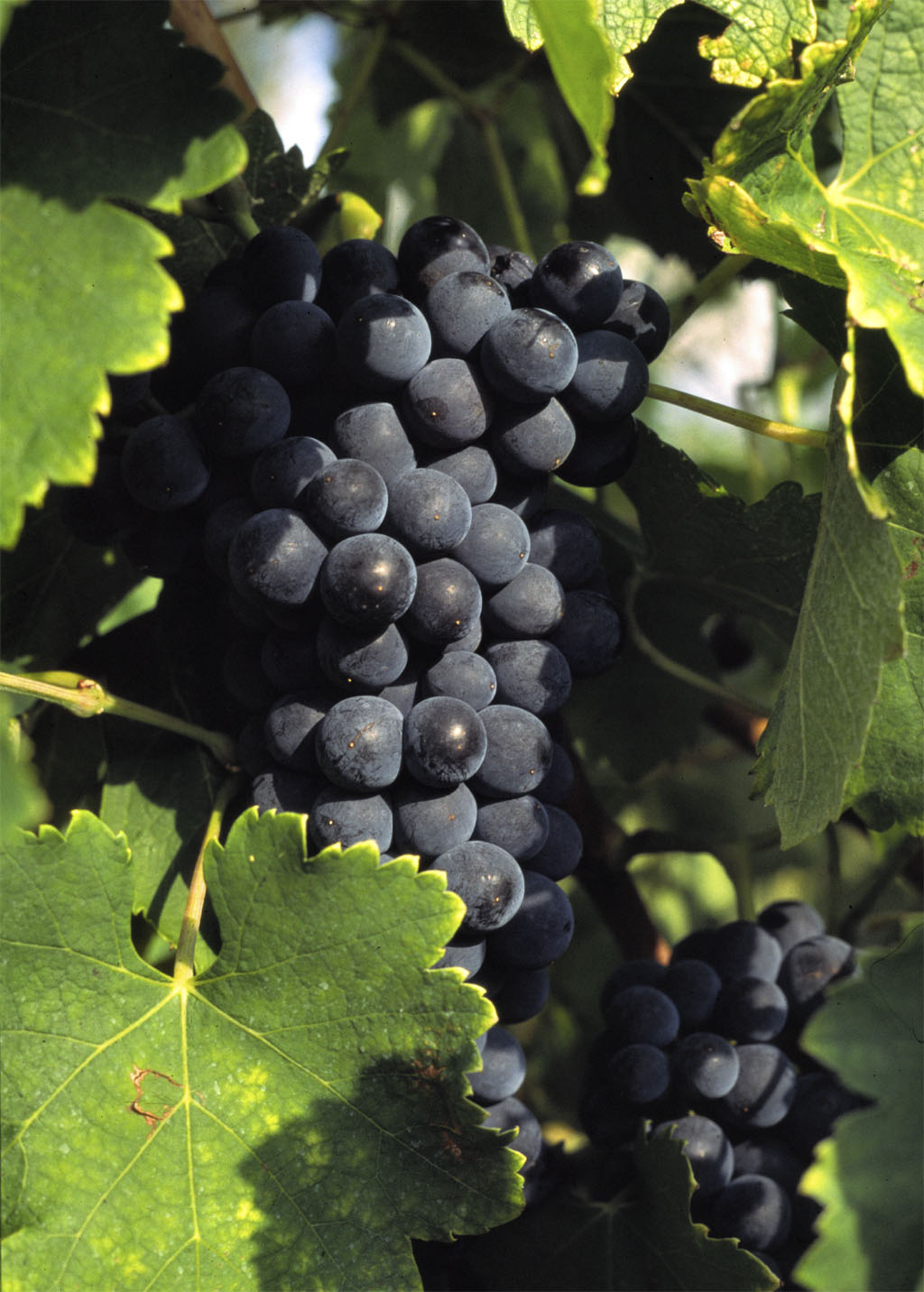
Fer Servadou

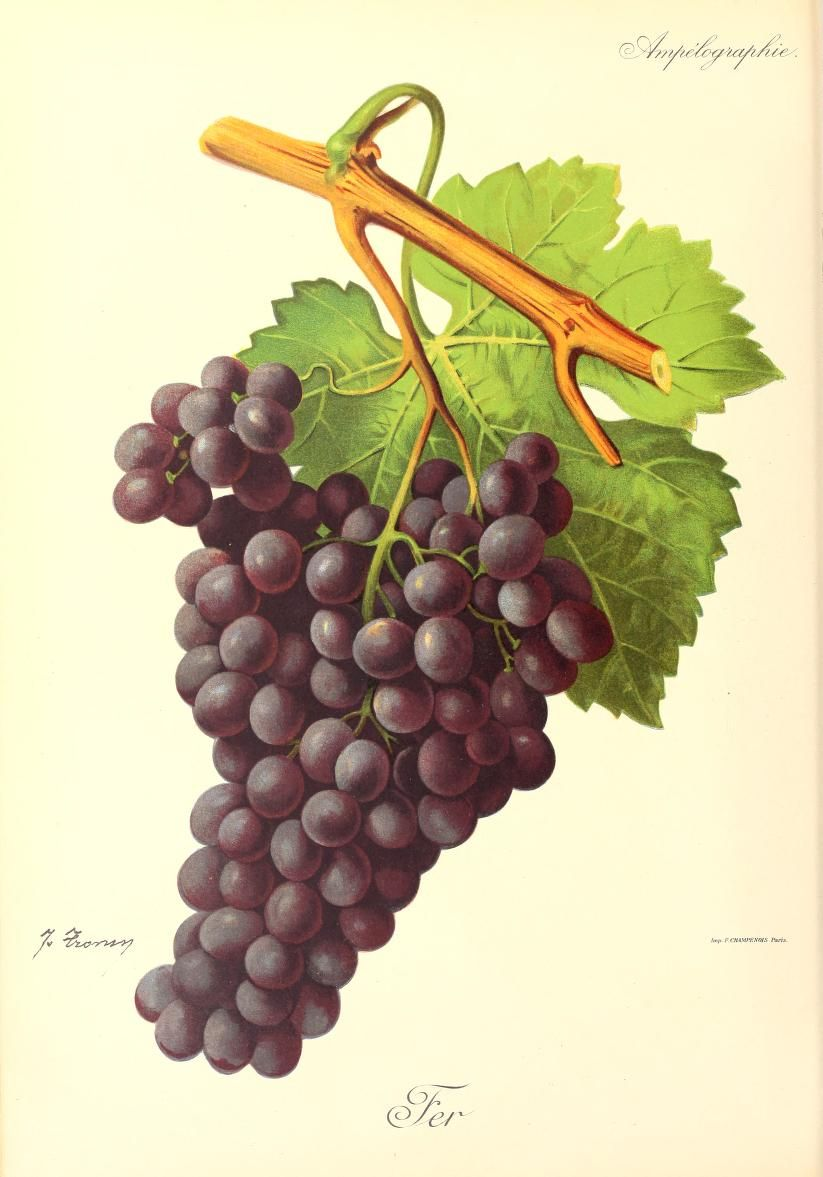
Fer Servadou in Viala & Vermorel

Fer (also known as Fer Servadou, Pinenc, Mansois and several other synonyms) is a red French wine grape variety that is grown primarily in South West France and is most notable for its role in the Appellation d'Origine Contrôlée (AOC) wines of Gaillac, Marcillac and Béarn but can also be found as minor component in the wines of Madiran, Cabardès and Bergerac. The grape is also featured in red blends from several vin de pays regions in the south west with significant plantings coming from the Aveyron department.

According to wine expert Oz Clarke, wine made from Fer is often characterized by its perfumed aromas of currants and red fruit, soft tannins, and concentration in fruit. The grape is not related to the clone of Malbec known as Fer that is widely planted throughout Argentina.

The name Fer is French for iron (Latin Ferrum), a reference to the very hard and "iron-like" wood of the vine's above ground canopy. Because of this very hard wood stock, the vine can be difficult to prune and trellis.

== History ==
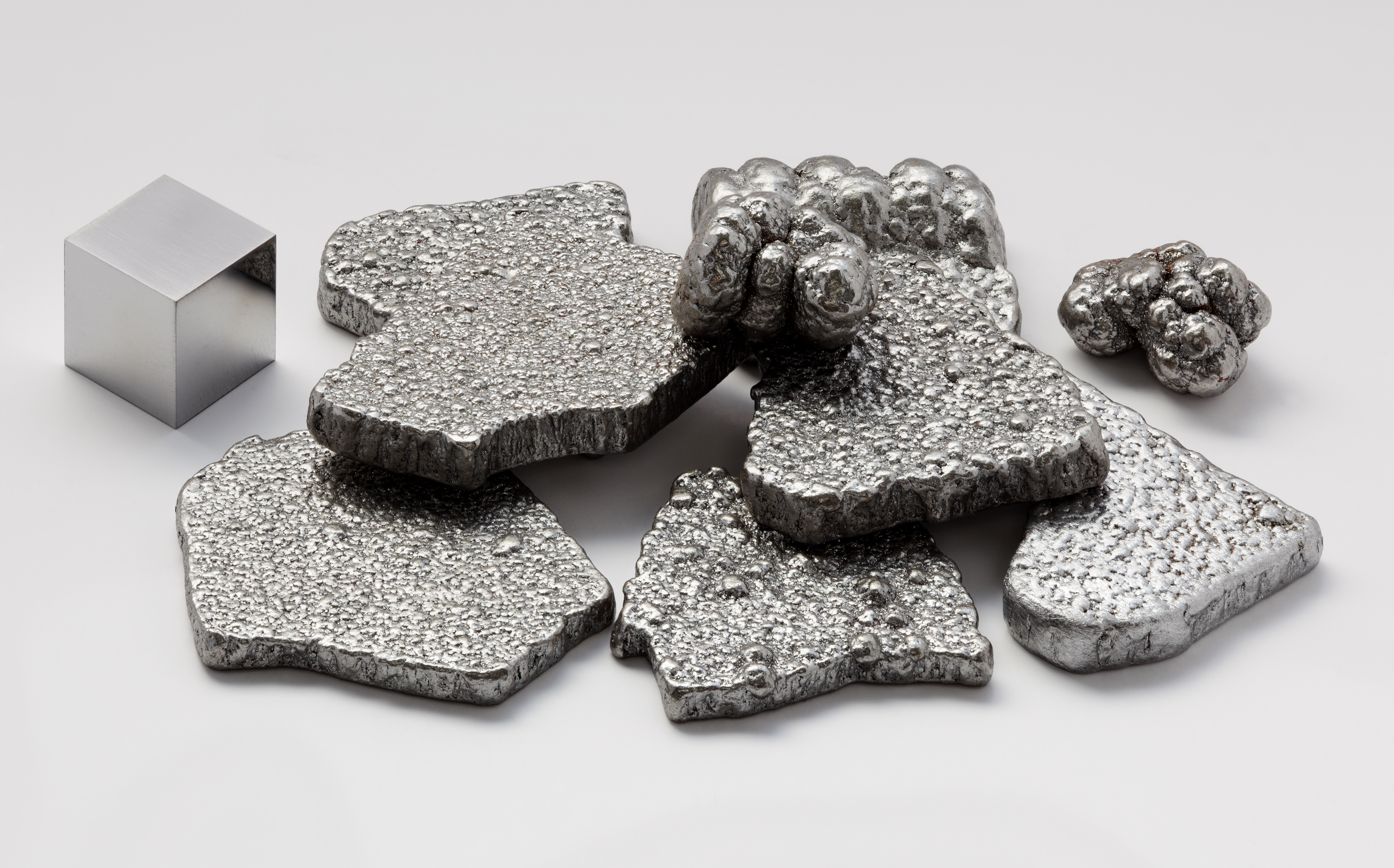
The very hard wood stock of the Fer's grapevine gave rise to the grape's name from the French and Latin names for iron.

Fer has a long tradition in the southwestern wine regions of France and is possibly indigenous to the area. For centuries many of the full-bodied red wines of the many wine-producing communes often included some percentage of Fer in the blend. The grape was prized for the color and concentration it added even though viticulture and cultivation could be difficult due to its extremely hard wood stock. Though the grape developed numerous synonyms throughout the region, the "iron-like" hardness of the vine's wood gave rise to its primary name, Fer, which is also the French word for iron.

== Wine regions ==
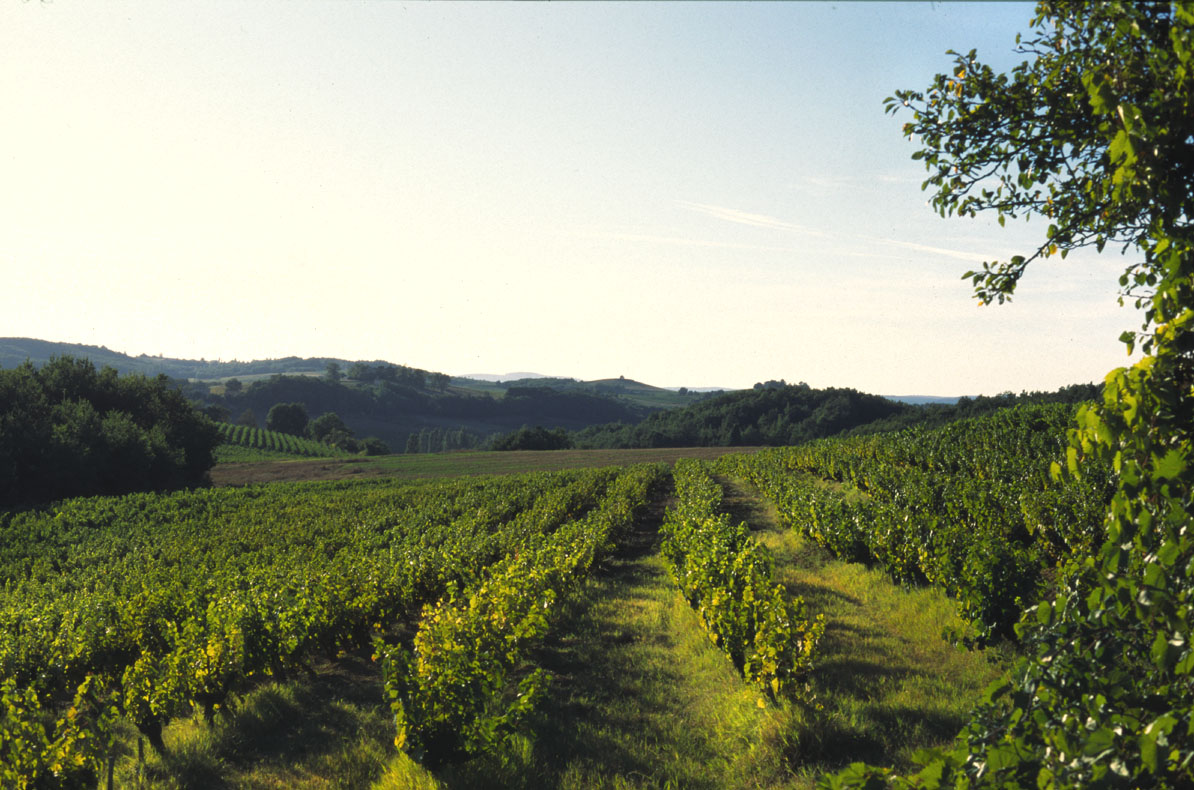
In the Gaillac wine region (pictured) of the Tarn department, Fer is also known as Brocol and Braucol

While plantings of Fer can be found through southwest France, the grape is most widely planted in the Aveyron department where it is featured in the wines of Marcillac, Entraygues and Estaing where the grape is also known as Mansois. In Madiran and Béarn, Fer is also known as Pinenc and while once more prominently utilized, now is usually only a complementary player to Tannat, Cabernet Sauvignon and Cabernet Franc. In the Tarn department, it can be found in the AOC wines of Gaillac where it's known under the old synonyms of Brocol and Braucol. Other AOC wines that include Fer among their permitted varieties is Cabardès in the Languedoc-Roussillon wine region and Bergerac in the Dordogne which is essentially the northernmost reach of the grape.

Outside France growers in Argentina thought that they had plantings of Fer under cultivation but in the late 20th century it was discovered that the 3,700 acres (1,700 hectares) of the vine was actually a clone of Malbec which, though a French grape itself, has no known relation to Fer.

== Wine styles ==
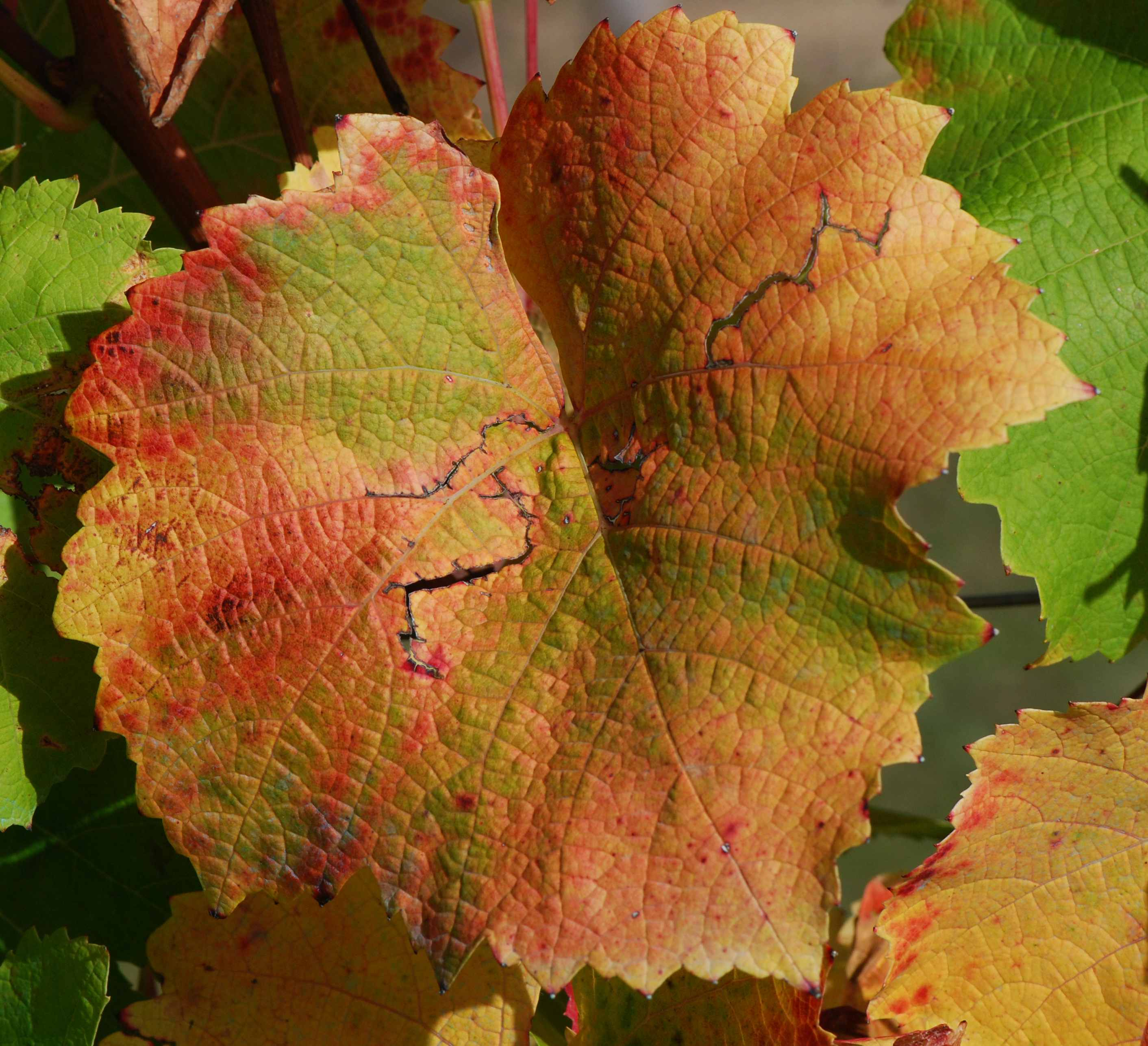
Grape leaf of the Fer vine in autumn.

Wine expert Jancis Robinson describes the wines made from Fer as "interestingly perfumed" with a rhubarb aroma note. Typically the wines are often full-bodied with dark ruby colors and concentrated fruit flavors. Robinson notes that the predominantly Fer composed wines of Marcillac can be tannic and rustic with smokey aromas.

== Synonyms ==
Over the years Fer and its wines have been known under various synonyms including Arech, Arrouya, Bequignaou, Béquignol, Bois droit, Braucol, Brocol, Caillaba, Camarouge, Camirouch, Chalamoncet, Chalosse noir, Chausset, Couahort, Cruchenit, Estronc, Estrong, Fer bequignaou, Fer Noir, Ferre, Folle Rouge, Here, Herrant, Herre, Mances, Mansoi, Mansois, Mauran, Moura, Mourach, Noir brun, Panereuil, Petit Fer, Petit here, Petit Mourastel, Petite here, Piec, Piek, Pienc, Pinenc, Plant de fer, Queufort, Salebourg, Saoubade, Saumances, Saumansois, Saumences, Scarcit, Veron and Verron.
