= Vin délimité de qualité supérieure =

Category of French wine

Vin délimité de qualité supérieure (French pronunciation: [vɛ̃ delimite də kalite sypeʁjœʁ], "delimited wine of superior quality"), usually abbreviated as VDQS, was the second highest category of French wine, below appellation d'origine contrôlée (AOC) in rank, but above vin de pays (country wine). VDQS was sometimes written as AOVDQS, with AO standing for appellation d'origine. VDQS wines were subject to restrictions on yield and vine variety, among others.

There were relatively few VDQS as they typically moved on to AOC status after a number of years. VDQS therefore represented a small part of overall French wine production. In 2005, VDQS wines made up 0.9% of volume amounting from 409,472 hectoliters of production. 42.3% of the VDQS wines produced in that year were white, with the remaining 57.7% being either red or rosé.

The VDQS category was eliminated altogether in 2011, with remaining VDQS wines either moving to AOC status or to the EU-governed protected geographical indication (French: indication géographique protégée) status.

== History ==
The VDQS category was created in 1949 to fill the gap between the categories Vin de pays (VdP) and AOC, the most prestigious with correspondingly demanding requirements. Typically, VDQS was a stepping stone to full AOC status, and unlike VdP covered local rather than regional areas.

When Algeria was still a French colony, a number of Algerian crus were granted VDQS status. At the time of Algerian independence in 1962, they numbered 12.

The frequency with which new VDQS were created varied over the years. Between 1984 and 1994 not a single new VDQS was added.

As a result of an ongoing crisis in the French wine industry, Bernard Pomel was tasked with making proposals on how to remedy the situation. The so-called Pomel report, which was presented to the French minister of agriculture on March 23, 2006, among other things proposed a simplification of the French wine classification system. This included eliminating the VDQS category. After political deliberations that somewhat delayed the initial timelines for the reform, the French parliament made the proposal into law in December 2007. The final wines labelled VDQS were those of the 2010 vintage, and by December 31, 2011, VDQS was removed entirely from the classification system. Existing VDQS areas had until then to either qualify for full AOC status or to become vins de pays. The latter was itself replaced by the protected geographical indication (PGI) classification (in France generally in its French form: indication géographique protégée). Almost all VDQS areas opted to achieve AOC status, initiating relevant procedures from 2008 to 2009.

== See also ==
- List of VDQS wines
- Geographical indications and traditional specialities in the European Union
- Quality wines produced in specified regions
