= Vesparo =

Vesparo is a synonym or alternative name for several wine grape varieties including:

- Malbec
- Merille
- Muscadelle
- Negrette
