= Bergerac wine =

Wine growing region of France

Bergerac
- Wine region
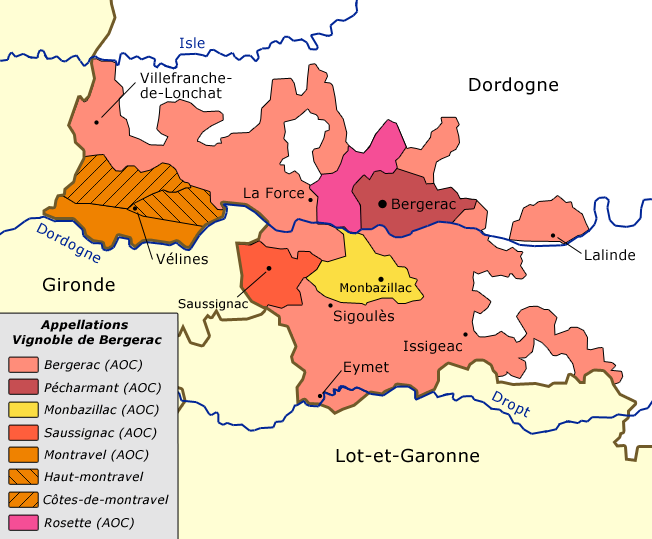
- Type: wine region, subregion of South West France
- Year established: first appellations created in 1936
- Country: France
- Size of planted vineyards: 12,000 hectares (30,000 acres)
- Grapes produced: Red: Cabernet Sauvignon, Cabernet Franc, Côt, Fer, Mérille and Merlot. White: Chenin blanc, Ondenc, Muscadelle, Sauvignon, Sémillon and Ugni blanc.
- Varietals produced: red

The Bergerac (French pronunciation: [bɛʁʒəʁak]) wine-growing region, a subregion of South West France around the town of Bergerac in the Dordogne department, comprises 93 communes. Its boundaries correspond more or less with those of the Arrondissement of Bergerac, immediately east of the Bordeaux wine region. 1,200 wine-growers cultivate an area of 12,000 hectares (30,000 acres). The Bergerac area contains 13 Appellations d'origine contrôlées (AOCs) for red, white (dry, medium-sweet and sweet) and rosé wines.

The vineyards extend across the southern part of the Dordogne department, the Arrondissement of Bergerac. Bergerac soil also features excellent drainage as a result of its proximity to the river Dordogne.

Approximately fifteen per cent of Bergerac AOC wine is sold outside France mainly to Great Britain, Belgium, Germany and the Netherlands.

== Name and etymology ==
Bergerac means "high fort" or "stronghold" in Occitan, the historical language of the region. The name likely derives from the Latin "burgus" (fort) and "acutus" (sharp, high, or pointed), reflecting its strategic location on a hill overlooking the Dordogne River.https://www.wisdomlib.org/cities/bergerac-19003

== History ==
As in the neighbouring wine-growing area of Bordeaux, the cultivation of vines began in this recently created country district of Bergeracois with the arrival of the Romans. Vines occupied a rapidly expanding place in the local economy, the river Dordogne helped to promote the wine trade along its navigable sections. The fall of the Roman Empire had few adverse effects on wine-growing, since the Visigoths, who became the country's new masters, were great wine drinkers.

The arrival of the Saracens and the subsequent Viking raids dealt a severe blow to wine-growing. The Muslims ordered the uprooting of all vines and this, combined with the threat of danger from the northern invaders, caused communities to withdraw into themselves and killed off all trade.

The Bergerac area has produced wines since the thirteenth century and has exported wines since 1254, when it began shipping its vintages to England based on special privileges granted by Henry III of England. These dispensations gave the Bergerac community the right to assembly, special tax exemptions and the right to ship their wines to Bordeaux unhindered. By the fourteenth century, Bergerac had strictly defined quality standards for its wine growing areas. Despite Bergerac's special privileges, during this period, Bordeaux was known to use its position, downriver and near the mouth of the Garonne river, to give its own wines priority over barrels of Bergerac wines being transported on freight carrying "gabarres" (river barges). However, the Parlement of Guyenne granted Bergerac a charter to transport freely its wines to the Atlantic in 1511. By that time, the Protestant-dominated Bergerac was also trading with Holland and Scandinavia via an overland route.

=== Renaissance to modern day ===
The south-western province of La Guyenne was an area in which Calvinism prospered. When the Wars of Religion broke out, many Protestants emigrated, in particular to Holland. Their attachment to their own regional produce meant that the popularity of Bergerac wines soared. The wine-growers decided to change their strategy and concentrate on producing dry white and sweet dessert wines, which were sought by this market.

In the 20th century, when the boundaries of the Bordeaux wine-growing area were being drawn up, it was decided they should match those of the Gironde department. Bergerac wines, which had long been sold under the generic name, Bordeaux, had to forge a new and separate identity overnight. The Libourne merchants who had traditionally sold these wines, now gave priority to wines with a Bordeaux label before even attempting to find a market for their other wines.

== Soil composition and geology ==
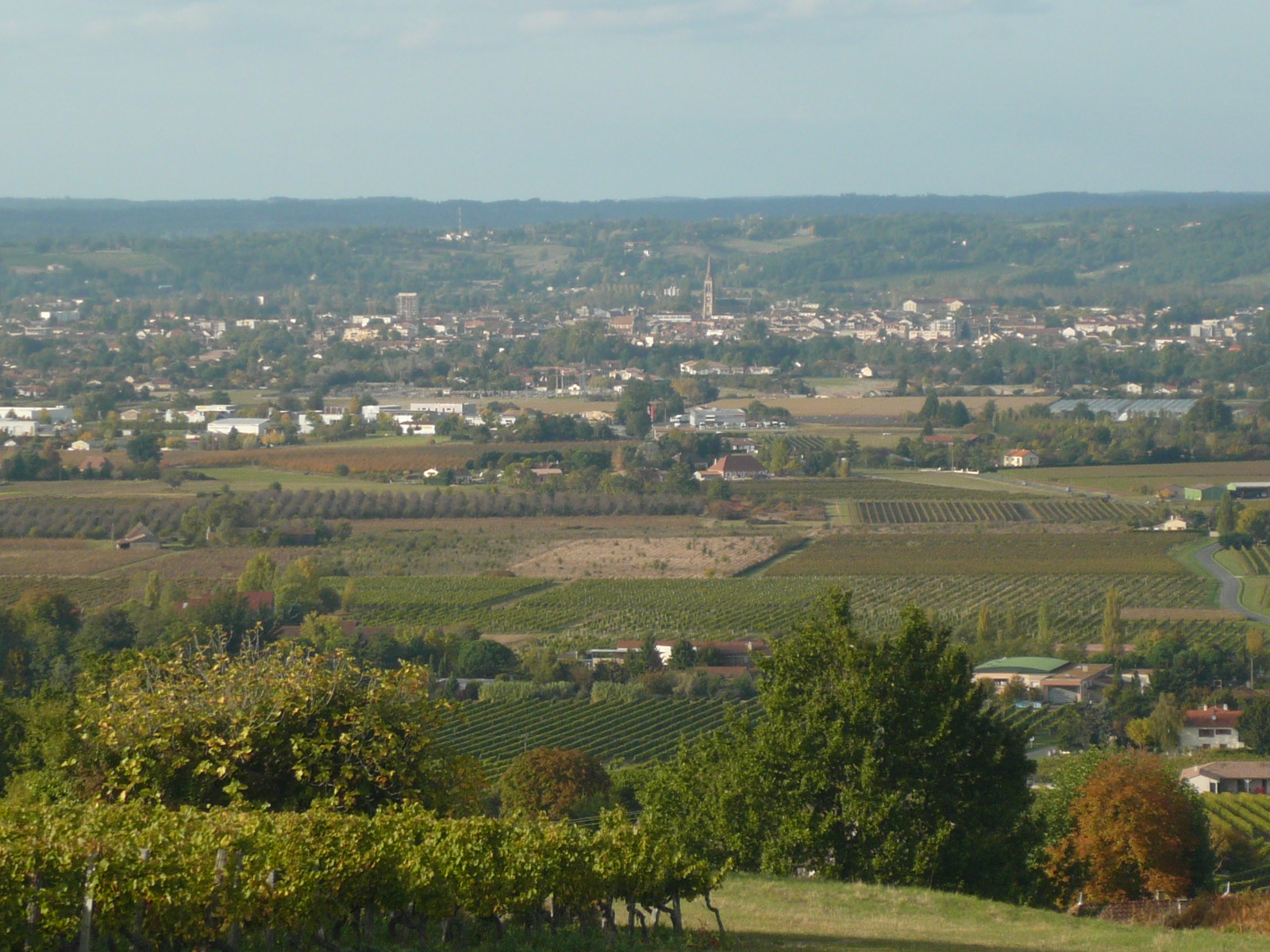
View of the vineyards from the Château of Monbazillac, with Bergerac in the background.

The nature of the soils mirrors the extent of the wine-growing area.

The lacustrian calcareous source rock of the south-eastern area produces brown soil containing calcareous pebbles. The soil varies in thickness.

To the north of the River Dordogne, the source rock contains sands and clays mixed with gravel; the latter produce acid soils with a faded brown colour, while an accumulation of minerals deep below the surface create an impermeable sub-stratum known as "tran".

In the south-east, boulbènes formed from sands and washed out silts result in a crusting soil that is poor in nutrients.

To the west, calcareous source rock that was once marine, produces brown soil containing calcareous pebbles. These are the same soils as those found in the wine-growing areas of the east Gironde, such as Saint-Émilion, Côtes de Castillon, Côtes de Franc.

During the Quaternary period, the River Dordogne deposited terraces of gravel alluvia on both banks. These soils are acidic and not particularly fertile, but they offer good drainage.

== Climate ==
Climate data for Côtes de Bergerac
Month	Jan	Feb	Mar	Apr	May	Jun	Jul	Aug	Sep	Oct	Nov	Dec	Year
Mean daily maximum °F	48.7	52.3	57.7	62.1	69.4	75.4	80.8	80.8	74.8	65.8	55.0	50.2	64.6
Mean daily minimum °F	34.3	35.2	37	41.2	48.4	53.8	57.4	56.5	51.4	46.6	39	36.0	44.8
Average precipitation inches	2.0	2.5	1.7	3.1	2.7	2.9	2.1	2.6	3.1	2.8	3.1	3.2	31.82
Mean daily maximum °C	9.3	11.3	14.3	16.7	20.8	24.1	27.1	27.1	23.8	18.8	12.8	10.1	18.1
Mean daily minimum °C	1.3	1.8	3	5.1	9.1	12.1	14.1	13.6	10.8	8.1	4	2.2	7.1
Average precipitation mm	52	63	42	80	68	73	53	66	79	71	80	82	808.2
Mean monthly sunshine hours	95	112	181	176	218	218	243	249	183	127	88	76	1,964
Source: france.meteofrance.com

The number of days with rainfall is 116, while fine weather days number 196, of which 123 enjoy small amounts of sunshine and 73 strong sunshine.

The Bergerac climate is temperate oceanic. Precipitation is evenly spread throughout the period when the vines are producing new growth. April is humid, which boosts vine growth and helps to prevent disastrous spring frosts. The summers are warm and relatively dry, ideal conditions for the ripening of grape clusters. Over four consecutive months, from May to August, the area enjoys more than 200 hours of sunshine a month. It is this sunshine which supplies the necessary energy for photosynthesis. September and October are critical months in determining the production of great vintage wines. Dry weather in September concentrates the grape aromas, while moderate humidity in October promotes the development of noble rot, vital for the creation of great dessert wines. The November and December rains replenish the soil's water reserves.

=== Grape varieties ===
The red wines are a blend of Cabernet Sauvignon, Cabernet Franc and Merlot, sometimes supplemented by Côt or, less commonly, by Fer Servadou or Mérille. They are often dark in color, with full-bodied flavours.

The white wines are mainly a blend of Sémillon with Sauvignon blanc, Sauvignon gris and Muscadelle, to which Ugni blanc, Ondenc and Chenin blanc are sometimes added. These combinations lead to the creation of fruity, dry white wines that can be powerful, and of medium-sweet or sweet wines that are aromatic and powerful.

== Appellations ==
- Bergerac AOC: dry white wines, rosé wines and red wines. These are wines that can be enjoyed young (from two years old).
- Côtes de Bergerac AOC: mellow, soft red wines that can be stored. They only reach their prime after several years' storage in the wine cellar.
- Montravel AOC: dry white wines and red wines.
- Haut-Montravel AOC: sweet white wines.
- Côtes de Montravel AOC: sweet white wines.
- Monbazillac AOC: white dessert wines that can be stored for a long time.
- Pécharmant AOC: red wines. These are wines suitable for medium-term storage.
- Rosette AOC: sweet white wines. This appellation, which is the smallest within the wine-growing area, produces little-known wines that are medium-sweet to sweet.
- Saussignac AOC: white dessert wines that can be stored medium to long-term.

== See also ==
- List of Vins de Primeur
