= Château de Monbazillac =

Castle in France

Coordinates: 44°47′41″N 0°29′35″E

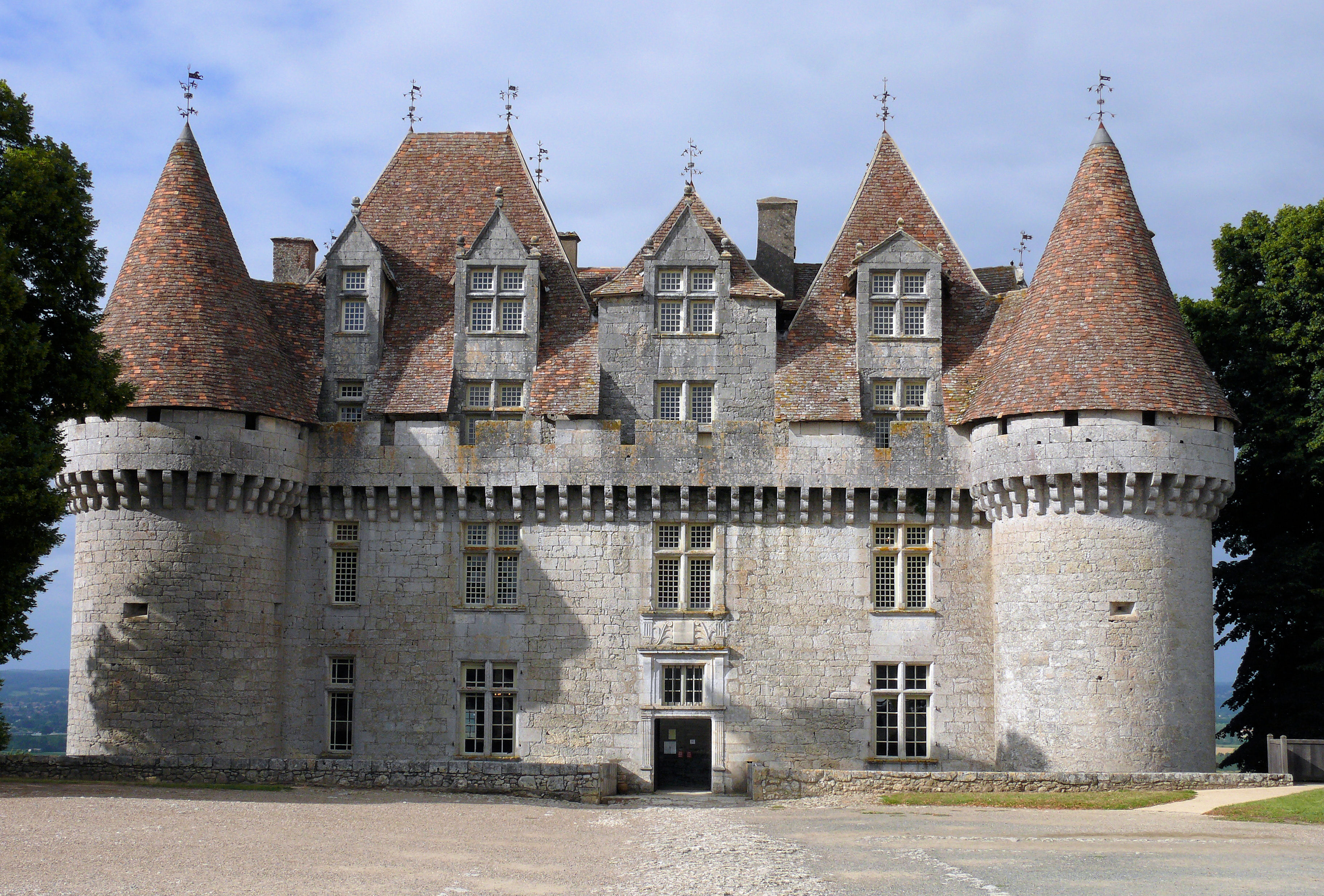
Entrance of the Château de Monbazillac

The Château de Monbazillac is a château in Monbazillac, Dordogne, Nouvelle-Aquitaine, France. The château is known for its production of sweet tasting wine. The wine's sweetness is assisted by a purposely cultivated fungus known as 'noble rot'.

== History ==
The château was built from 1550 to 1582 by Charles d'Aydie de Ribérac (1527-1584). In 1607, Louis de Bouchard d'Aubeterre, a Huguenot, bought the château. Pierre Barraud then owned the castle from 1666. In 1777, François Hilaire de Bacalan (1728-1804) purchased the château.

The château has been listed as an historic monument since 1936. The château has been the property of the 'Cave Coopérative de Monbazillac' company since 1960. Today, the castle is a museum where visitors can learn about wine production and local history.
