= Arlette Vassy =

French geophysicist (1913–2000)

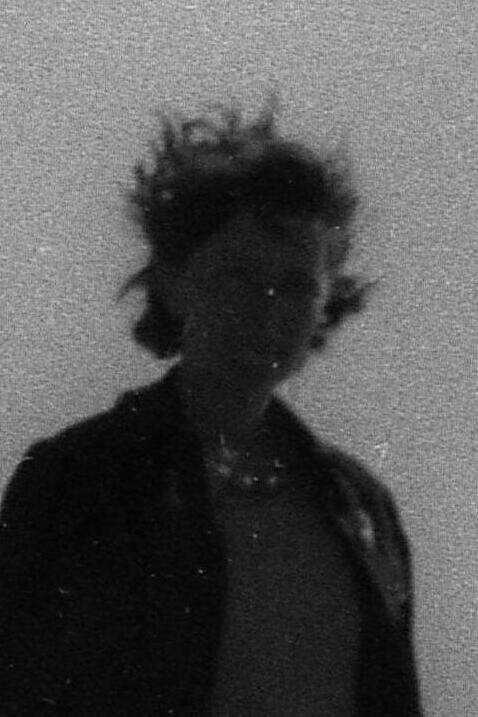
- Arlette Vassy observing in 1943
- Born: Arlette Jeanne Tournaire; 28 January 1913; Saint-Nexans, France
- Died: April 30, 2000 (aged 87); Paris, France
- Education: University of Paris
- Spouse: Étienne Vassy
- Scientific career
- Fields: Geophysics
- Workplaces: CNRS

Arlette Jeanne Vassy (née Tournaire, 28 January 1913 – 30 April 2000) was a French geophysicist. At the Centre national de la recherche scientifique (CNRS), she became a senior researcher in 1954 and a specialist in atmospheric ozone. She organised ozone observations in France during the International Geophysical Year 1957–1958. She was appointed head of the Ozone Commission of the French National Committee as a consequence of this work. Vassy identified a hole in the ozone layer in 1961. In 1968, she became director of the Laboratoire de Physique de l'Atmosphère at the CNRS.

== Biography ==
=== Early life and education ===
Arlette Jeanne Tournaire was born on 28 January 1913 at Saint-Nexans, daughter of Jeanne (née Vitrac) and Pierre Tournaire. Her father was a highly qualified physics teacher. She studied physics at the Université de Paris where she graduated in 1935.

On 30 July 1936, she married physicist Étienne Vassy, taking his surname and the couple worked together for many years. In 1937, she and Étienne spent five months studying light absorption in the atmosphere at the newly created geophysical station in Ifrane, Morocco. Between 1937 and 1947, she and her husband studied the upper atmosphere at the Pic du Midi observatory. During World War II, in 1941 she defended her doctoral thesis at the Sorbonne, exploring the absorption of light by the atmosphere. Her work was based on measurements taken at the Trappes and Mont Ventoux observatories.

=== Career ===
Arlette Vassy was appointed research fellow at the Centre national de la recherche scientifique in 1942.

After the Liberation of France, Vassy was expelled from the CNRS by the épuration légale. Her husband was also expelled from the Sorbonne. In 1943 she, Étienne and Paul Abadie was working with a photomultiplier to observe the sky at the Pic du Midi Observatory.

Working in conjunction with her husband, she determined the spectral range of the Chappuis bands in 1948. A year later, Arlette Vassy published Physique de l'atmosphère (Physics of the Atmosphere) in the Journal de Physique et du radium, in which she proposed using V-2 rockets to explore the upper atmosphere.

At the CNRS, she became a senior researcher in 1954 and a specialist in atmospheric ozone. She organised ozone observations in France during the International Geophysical Year 1957–1958. She was appointed head of the Ozone Commission of the French National Committee as a consequence of this work.

From 1949, Vassy was scientific advisor for forty rocket launches from 1949. She witnessed and participated in the first scientific experiments using sounding rockets (such as the Véronique) to study the atmosphere. Étienne Vassy's 1955 report on the benefits of using artificial satellites to study the atmosphere echoed some of the ideas already put forward by his wife. Many historians, including Philippe Varnoteaux, believe that this report triggered the government's decision to embark on a space programme. From 1963 to 1967, she headed the French high-altitude ballistic rocket programme.

In 1959, Vassy succeeded her husband as France's representative to the International Ozone Commission.

Vassy identified a hole in the ozone layer in 1961 using measurements made in Antarctica and the Kerguelen Islands. Her work was foundational in the understanding of the ozone layer.

Vassy chaired the quadrennial Ozone Symposium held in Monaco in September 1968, where Dutch climatologist Paul Crutzen presented his first work on ozone destruction in dry and wet environments.

In 1968, Vassy took over as director of the CNRS Atmospheric Physics Laboratory.

Arlette Vassy died on 30 April 2000 in the 16th arrondissement of Paris.

== Awards and recognition ==
In 1959, Vassy was awarded the grade of Officier in the Ordre des Palmes Académiques.

In 2026, Vassy was announced as one of 72 historical women in STEM whose names have been proposed to be added to the 72 men already celebrated on the Eiffel Tower. The plan was announced by the Mayor of Paris, Anne Hidalgo following the recommendations of a committee led by Isabelle Vauglin of Femmes et Sciences and Jean-François Martins, representing the operating company which runs the Eiffel Tower.

== Selected publications ==
- "Sur l'atmosphère d'absorption dans l'ultraviolet". Annales de Physique. 11 (16): 145–203. 1941. doi:10.1051/anphys/194111160145.
- Fondements des théories de la photographie. Masson & Cie. 1953.
- Appareil pour la mesure de l'épaisseur d'eau condensable de l'atmosphère. Paris: Blondel La Rougery; Gauthier-Villars. 1941.
- Éditions de l'Effet Herschel. Paris: Maison de la Chimie. 1946.
- "Ozone atmosphérique". Advances in Geophysics. 11: 115–173. 1965. doi:10.1016/S0065-2687(08)60496-3.
- —— (1953). Fondements théoriques de la photographie. Éditions de la Revue d'Optique.
- ——; Vassy, Étienne (1976). La luminescence nocturne. Springer.
