= Bergerac, Dordogne =

Bergerac Brageirac (Occitan)
- Subprefecture and commune
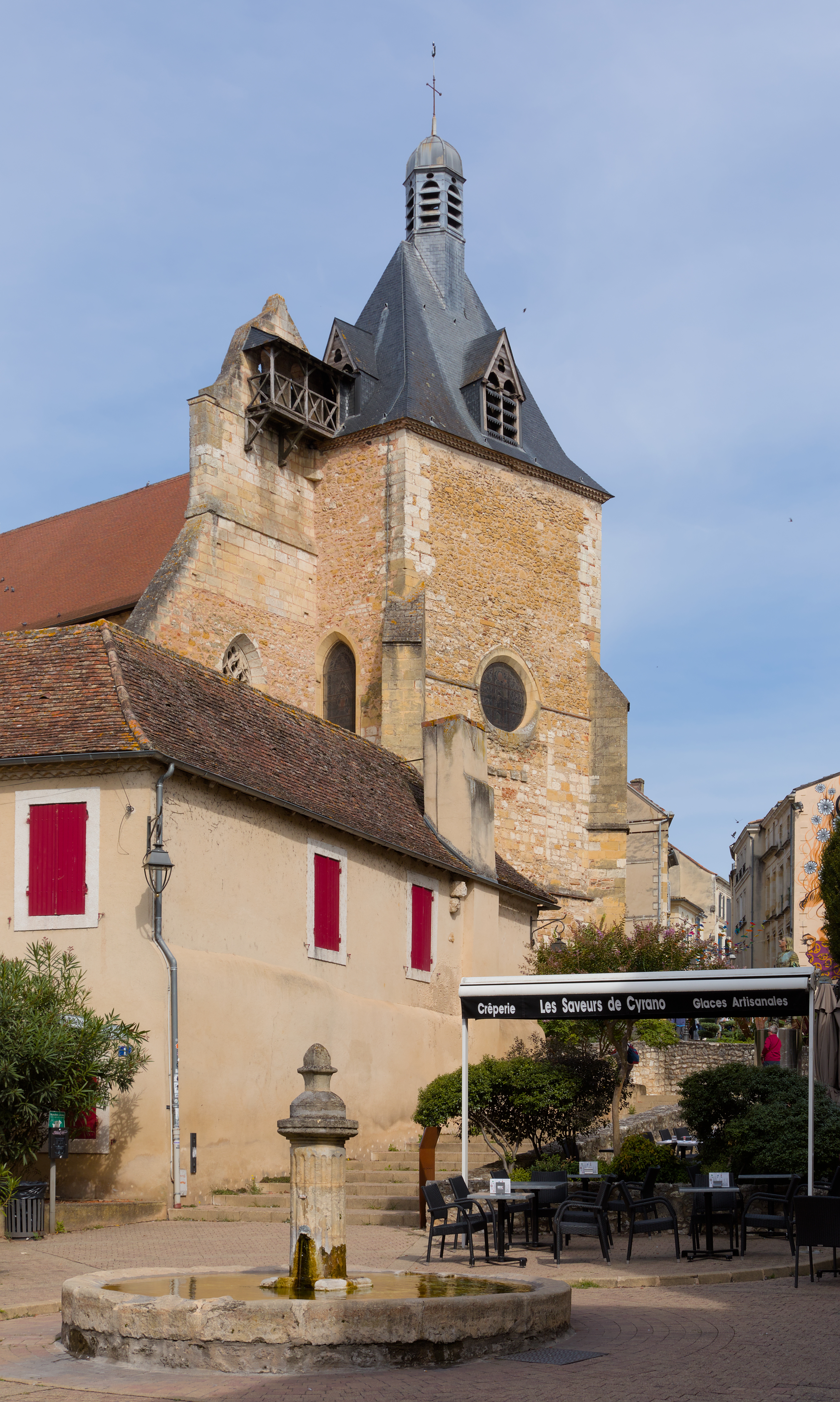
- Place Pélissière and Église Saint-Jacques in the town centre of Bergerac

- Coat of arms
- Location of Bergerac
- Location within France Location within Nouvelle-Aquitaine
- Coordinates: 44°51′13″N 0°29′15″E
- Country: France
- Region: Nouvelle-Aquitaine
- Department: Dordogne
- Arrondissement: Bergerac
- Canton: Bergerac-1 and 2
- Intercommunality: CA Bergeracoise

Government
  - Mayor (2020–2026): Jonathan Prioleaud (LR)
- Area^{1}: 56.10 km^{2} (21.66 sq mi)
- Elevation: 29 m (95 ft)
- Highest elevation: 146 m (479 ft)
- Lowest elevation: 12 m (39 ft)
- Population (2023): 27,110
  - Density: 483.2/km^{2} (1,252/sq mi)
- Time zone: UTC+01:00 (CET)
  - Summer (DST): UTC+02:00 (CEST)
- INSEE/Postal code: 24037 /24100
- ^{1} French Land Register data, which excludes lakes, ponds, glaciers > 1 km^{2} (0.386 sq mi or 247 acres) and river estuaries.

Bergerac (French pronunciation: [bɛʁʒəʁak]; Occitan: Brageirac [braˈzɛjra]) is a subprefecture of the Dordogne department, in the region of Nouvelle-Aquitaine, Southwestern France. With a population of 27,110 (2023), it is the department's second-most populated commune after the prefecture Périgueux. Located on the banks of the river Dordogne, Bergerac was designated a Town of Art and History by the Ministry of Culture in 2013.

== History ==
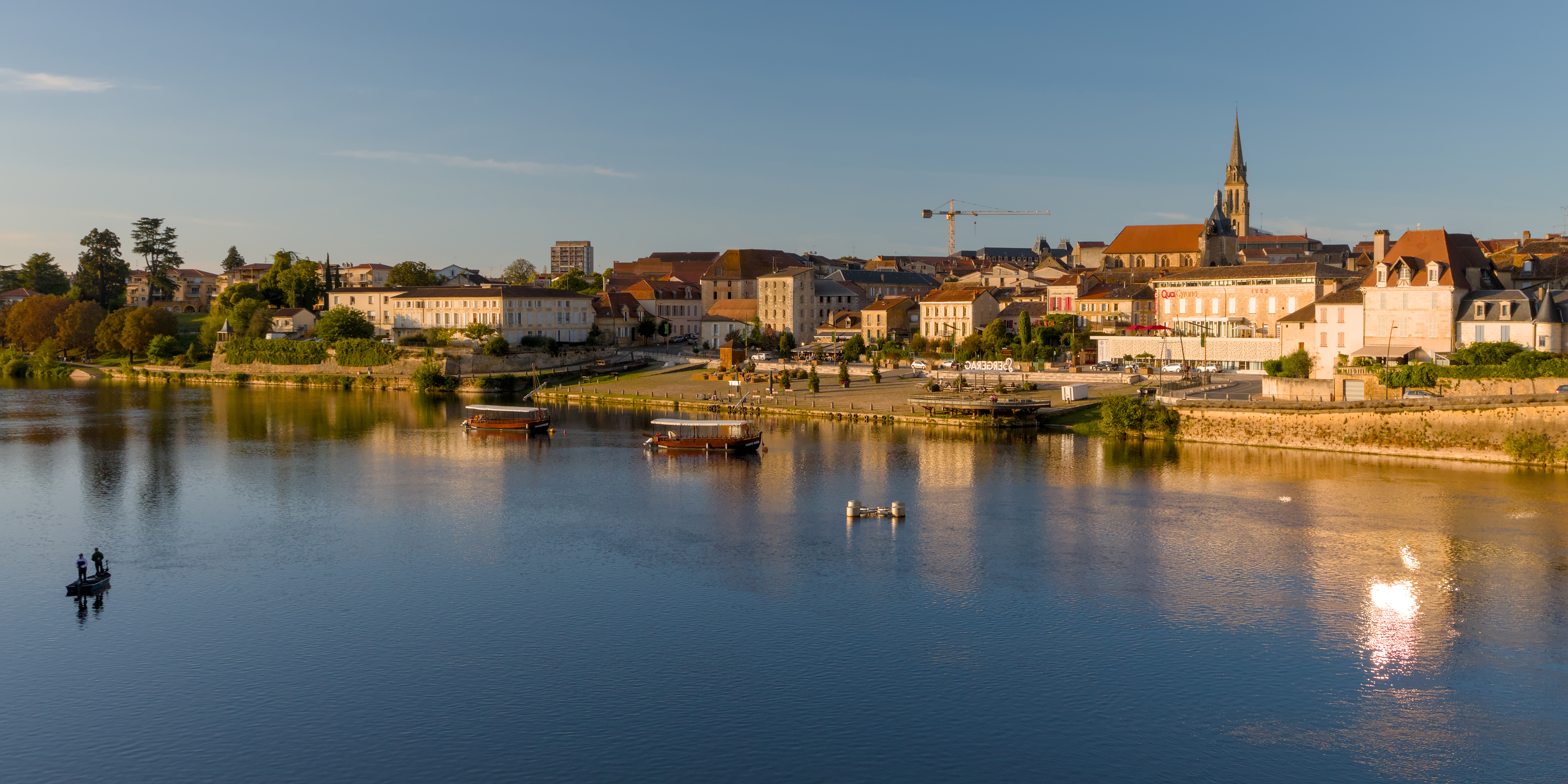
View of the town in late afternoon

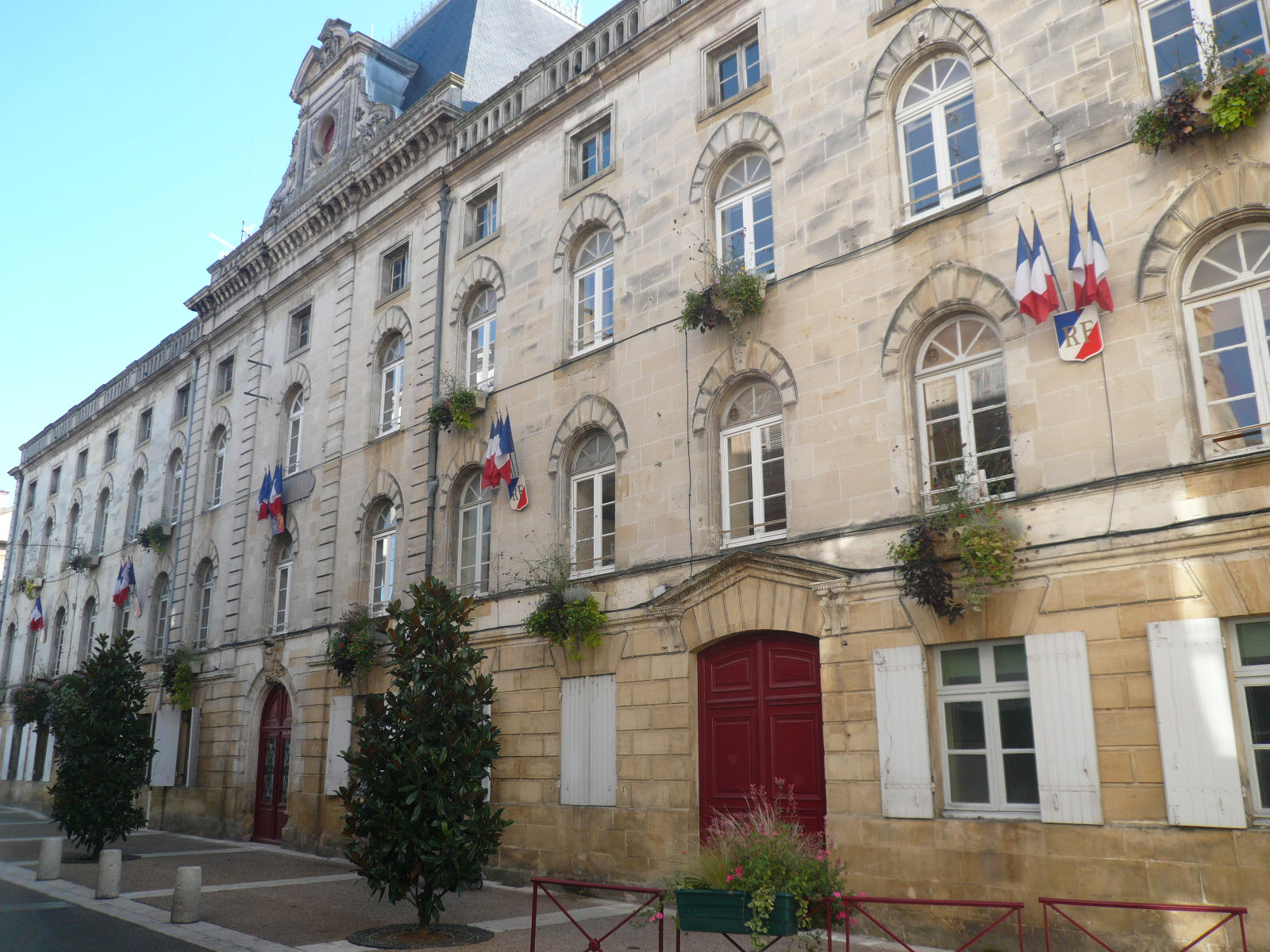
The Hôtel de Ville

In 1565, Charles IX of France visited Bergerac during his grand tour.

On 17 September 1577, amidst the French Wars of Religion, the Treaty of Bergerac, also known as the Peace of Bergerac (French: Paix de Bergerac), was signed between Henri III of France and Protestants to put a temporary end to the conflict. The treaty was negotiated by important figures on each side of the conflict, namely Nicolas de Neufville, seigneur de Villeroy and Armand de Gontaut, baron de Biron on the King's side and François de la Noue and François, Duke of Montpensier on the Protestant side.

The Hôtel de Ville was completed around 1795.

Bergerac, a site where members of the French Resistance in Dordogne were incarcerated and interrogated during World War II, was freed from German occupation on 21 August 1944.

== Demographics ==
Historical population

Year	Pop.	±% p.a.
1793	11,720	—
1800	8,544	−4.41%
1806	8,665	+0.23%
1821	8,044	−0.49%
1831	8,557	+0.62%
1836	9,285	+1.65%
1841	10,102	+1.70%
1846	9,873	−0.46%
1851	10,402	+1.05%
1856	10,875	+0.89%
1861	12,116	+2.18%
1866	12,123	+0.01%
1872	11,699	−0.59%
1876	13,120	+2.91%
1881	15,042	+2.77%
1886	14,353	−0.93%
1891	14,735	+0.53%
1896	15,642	+1.20%
1901	15,936	+0.37%

Year	Pop.	±% p.a.
1906	15,623	−0.40%
1911	16,162	+0.68%
1921	17,041	+0.53%
1926	16,593	−0.53%
1931	17,520	+1.09%
1936	18,902	+1.53%
1946	22,525	+1.77%
1954	23,622	+0.60%
1962	25,185	+0.80%
1968	27,165	+1.27%
1975	27,764	+0.31%
1982	26,832	−0.49%
1990	26,899	+0.03%
1999	26,053	−0.35%
2007	27,601	+0.72%
2012	27,972	+0.27%
2017	26,833	−0.83%
2023	27,110	+0.17%

Source: EHESS and INSEE (1968–2023)

== Climate ==
With climate change, Bergerac's climate has varied. A study carried out in 2014 by the Directorate General for Energy and Climate predicts that the average temperature should increase and the average rainfall decrease.

Climate data for Bergerac (1991–2020 normals, extremes 1988–present)
Month	Jan	Feb	Mar	Apr	May	Jun	Jul	Aug	Sep	Oct	Nov	Dec	Year
Record high °C (°F)	19.1 (66.4)	25.9 (78.6)	26.6 (79.9)	29.7 (85.5)	36.0 (96.8)	41.8 (107.2)	41.5 (106.7)	42.1 (107.8)	37.5 (99.5)	32.7 (90.9)	24.8 (76.6)	20.0 (68.0)	42.1 (107.8)
Mean daily maximum °C (°F)	9.9 (49.8)	11.7 (53.1)	15.7 (60.3)	18.2 (64.8)	22.0 (71.6)	25.5 (77.9)	27.7 (81.9)	27.9 (82.2)	24.4 (75.9)	19.8 (67.6)	13.7 (56.7)	10.4 (50.7)	18.9 (66.0)
Daily mean °C (°F)	5.9 (42.6)	6.5 (43.7)	9.7 (49.5)	12.1 (53.8)	15.8 (60.4)	19.3 (66.7)	21.1 (70.0)	21.1 (70.0)	17.6 (63.7)	14.2 (57.6)	9.2 (48.6)	6.3 (43.3)	13.2 (55.8)
Mean daily minimum °C (°F)	2.0 (35.6)	1.3 (34.3)	3.7 (38.7)	6.0 (42.8)	9.6 (49.3)	13.1 (55.6)	14.6 (58.3)	14.3 (57.7)	10.8 (51.4)	8.6 (47.5)	4.7 (40.5)	2.2 (36.0)	7.6 (45.7)
Record low °C (°F)	−10.5 (13.1)	−17.1 (1.2)	−12.0 (10.4)	−5.1 (22.8)	−1.5 (29.3)	2.9 (37.2)	6.4 (43.5)	4.8 (40.6)	1.2 (34.2)	−5.5 (22.1)	−9.8 (14.4)	−12.4 (9.7)	−17.1 (1.2)
Average precipitation mm (inches)	67.0 (2.64)	53.2 (2.09)	53.7 (2.11)	76.1 (3.00)	77.4 (3.05)	63.2 (2.49)	57.0 (2.24)	61.5 (2.42)	66.2 (2.61)	65.2 (2.57)	76.2 (3.00)	76.2 (3.00)	792.9 (31.22)
Average precipitation days (≥ 1.0 mm)	11.4	8.9	10.1	11.2	9.8	8.4	7.0	7.5	8.4	9.3	11.0	11.1	114.2
Mean monthly sunshine hours	82.8	113.6	167.9	183.2	211.2	235.7	256.2	247.1	204.2	144.0	93.4	82.1	2,021.3
Source: Meteociel

== Economy ==
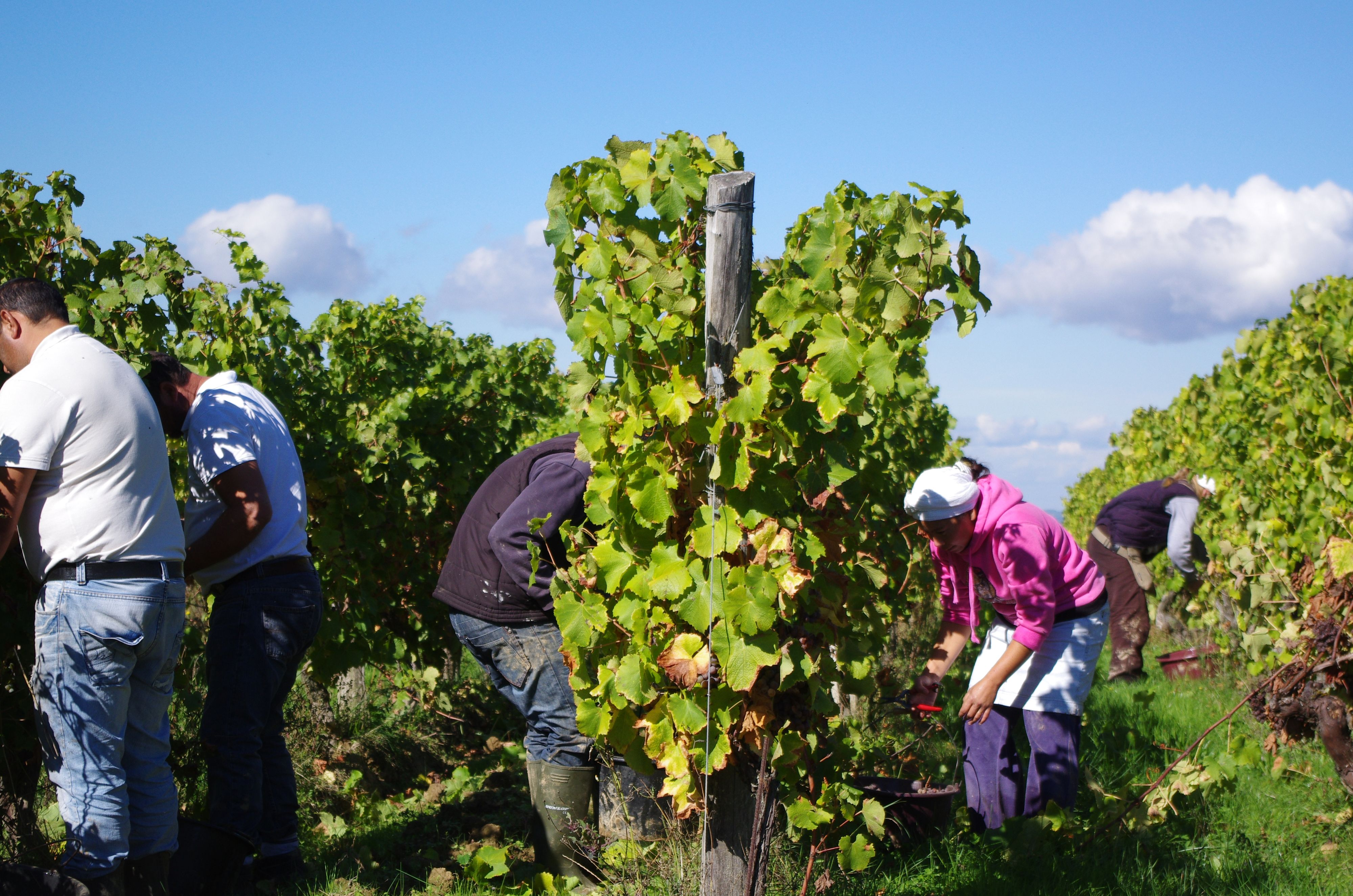
Côtes-de-Bergerac grape harvesting

The region is primarily known for wine and tobacco. It has twelve recognised wine AOCs (appellations d'origine contrôlée):

- Bergerac
- Bergerac Rosé
- Bergerac Sec (dry)
- Côtes-de-Bergerac
- Côtes de Bergerac Blanc
- Côtes de Montravel
- Montravel (red and white)
- Haut-Montravel
- Saussignac
- Monbazillac
- Pécharmant
- Rosette

== Immigration ==
Bergerac is home to a population of immigrant British. This trend is not unique to Bergerac and is evident throughout the Dordogne. In part, this is driven by house prices which are very affordable when compared with either the French or British national averages. The increasing British presence has led to some integration initiatives such as the non-profit Université du Temps Libre which offers French language classes and a programme of cultural activities; mainly to increase assimilation.

== Tourism ==
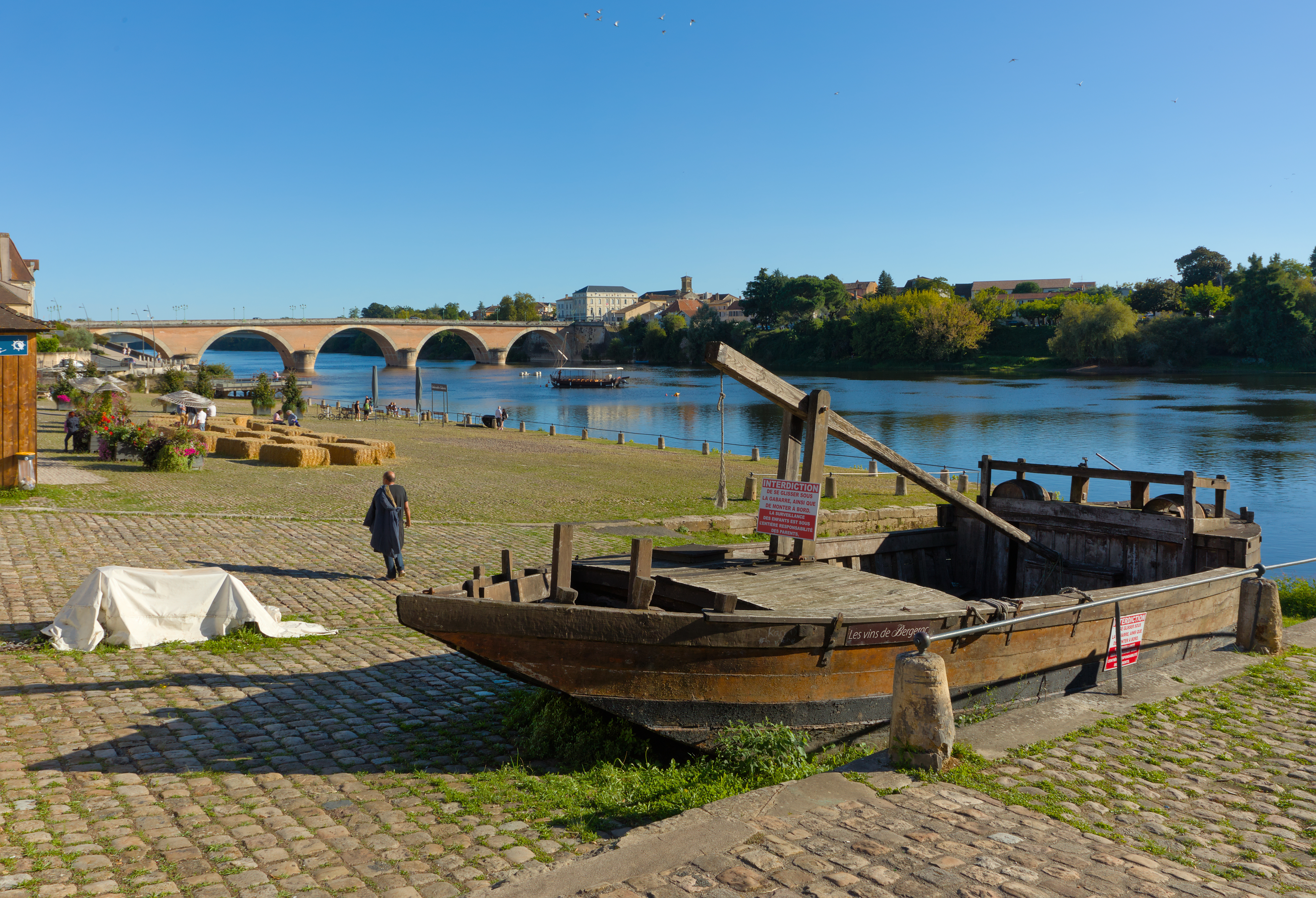
The town's former harbour, on the Dordogne river.

The town has a growing tourism industry. The region's association with wines is also a key motivating factor for much tourism with wine tours, chateau visits and a wine house by the river which features an exhibition on the history of wine growing. Nearby sites for tourists include the Arboretum de Podestat, Château de Monbazillac, the town museum, statue museum, and tobacco museum. The church of Notre Dame is located in the town centre. The Dordogne River is also a significant tourist attraction for river boat tours and kayak rental.

== Cyrano de Bergerac ==
Old statue of Cyrano de Bergerac

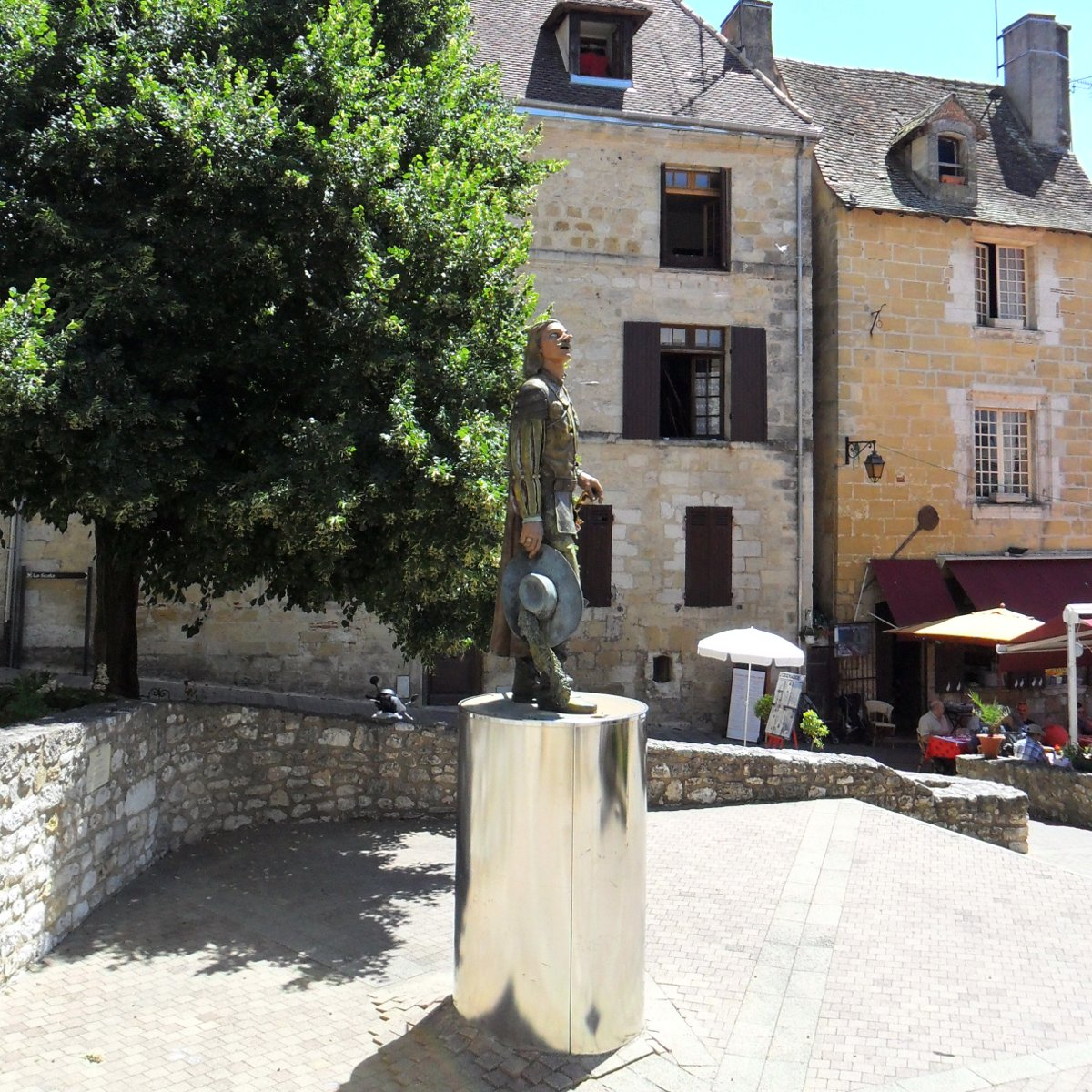
Newer statue of Cyrano de Bergerac

The town contains two statues of Cyrano de Bergerac, subject of a famous eponymous play by Edmond Rostand. An old stone statue stands on Place de la Myrpe, facing Place du Docteur Cayla. A newer statue, painted in colour and standing on a stainless steel pedestal, has been erected on Place Pélissière.

== Transport ==
Bergerac is served by Bergerac-Roumanière Airport (code EGC), which has internal flights, as well as routes to UK airports including Southampton, Bristol, Manchester, East Midlands, London Luton, Edinburgh, Exeter, Liverpool, Birmingham, Leeds Bradford and London Stansted Airport. Transavia also flies to Bergerac from Amsterdam and Rotterdam.

Bergerac has an SNCF station with regular services to Bordeaux and Sarlat-la-Canéda. A weekday bus service operates between Bergerac and Périgueux, mainly serving student commuters.

== Education ==
Bergerac is located within the Bordeaux Académie, which covers the entire former Aquitaine region. The main high school is Lycée Maine de Biran. Other high schools in the town include the private school Institution Sainte-Marthe Saint-Front, Lycée Jean Capelle and Lycée Professionnel de l'Alba.

== International relations ==
Bergerac, Dordogne is twinned with:

- Repentigny, Canada, since 1997
- Faenza, Italy, since 1998
- Kenitra, Morocco, since 2016
- Ostrów Wielkopolski, Poland, since 2017
- Hohen Neuendorf, Germany, since 2018
- (United Kingdom) Dursley, England, since 2025

== See also ==
- Communes of the Dordogne department
- Elias Bruneti of Bergerac
