= Mouleydier =

- Commune
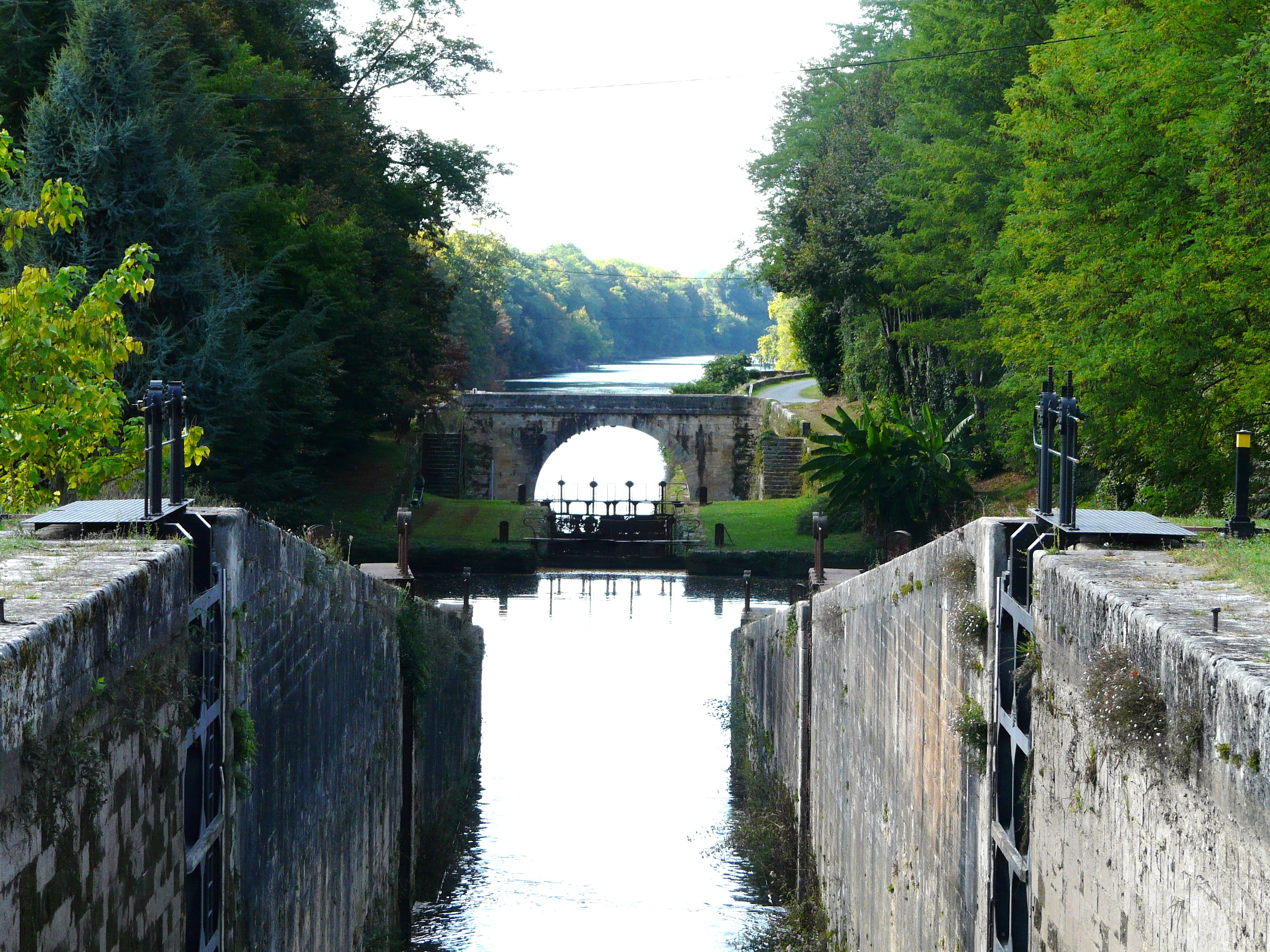
- Locks on the Canal de Lalinde

- Coat of arms
- Location of Mouleydier
- Location within France Location within Nouvelle-Aquitaine
- Coordinates: 44°51′23″N 0°35′48″E
- Country: France
- Region: Nouvelle-Aquitaine
- Department: Dordogne
- Arrondissement: Bergerac
- Canton: Bergerac-2
- Intercommunality: CA Bergeracoise

Government
  - Mayor (2020–2026): Michel Delfieux
- Area^{1}: 8.49 km^{2} (3.28 sq mi)
- Elevation: 36 m (118 ft)
- Highest elevation: 132 m (433 ft)
- Lowest elevation: 17 m (56 ft)
- Population (2023): 1,152
  - Density: 136/km^{2} (351/sq mi)
- Time zone: UTC+01:00 (CET)
  - Summer (DST): UTC+02:00 (CEST)
- INSEE/Postal code: 24296 /24520
- ^{1} French Land Register data, which excludes lakes, ponds, glaciers > 1 km^{2} (0.386 sq mi or 247 acres) and river estuaries.

Mouleydier (French pronunciation: [muledje]; Occitan: Montleidièr) is a commune in the Dordogne department in Nouvelle-Aquitaine in southwestern France.

Mouleydier is the site of a bridge over the river Dordogne.

== History ==
On 21 June 1944 the SS pillaged and burned Mouleydier and shot to death 22 members of the Resistance.

== Population ==
Historical population
Year	Pop.	±% p.a.
1968	989	—
1975	983	−0.09%
1982	966	−0.25%
1990	1,049	+1.04%
1999	1,059	+0.11%
2007	1,008	−0.62%
2012	1,167	+2.97%
2017	1,132	−0.61%
2023	1,152	+0.29%
Source: INSEE

== Gallery ==
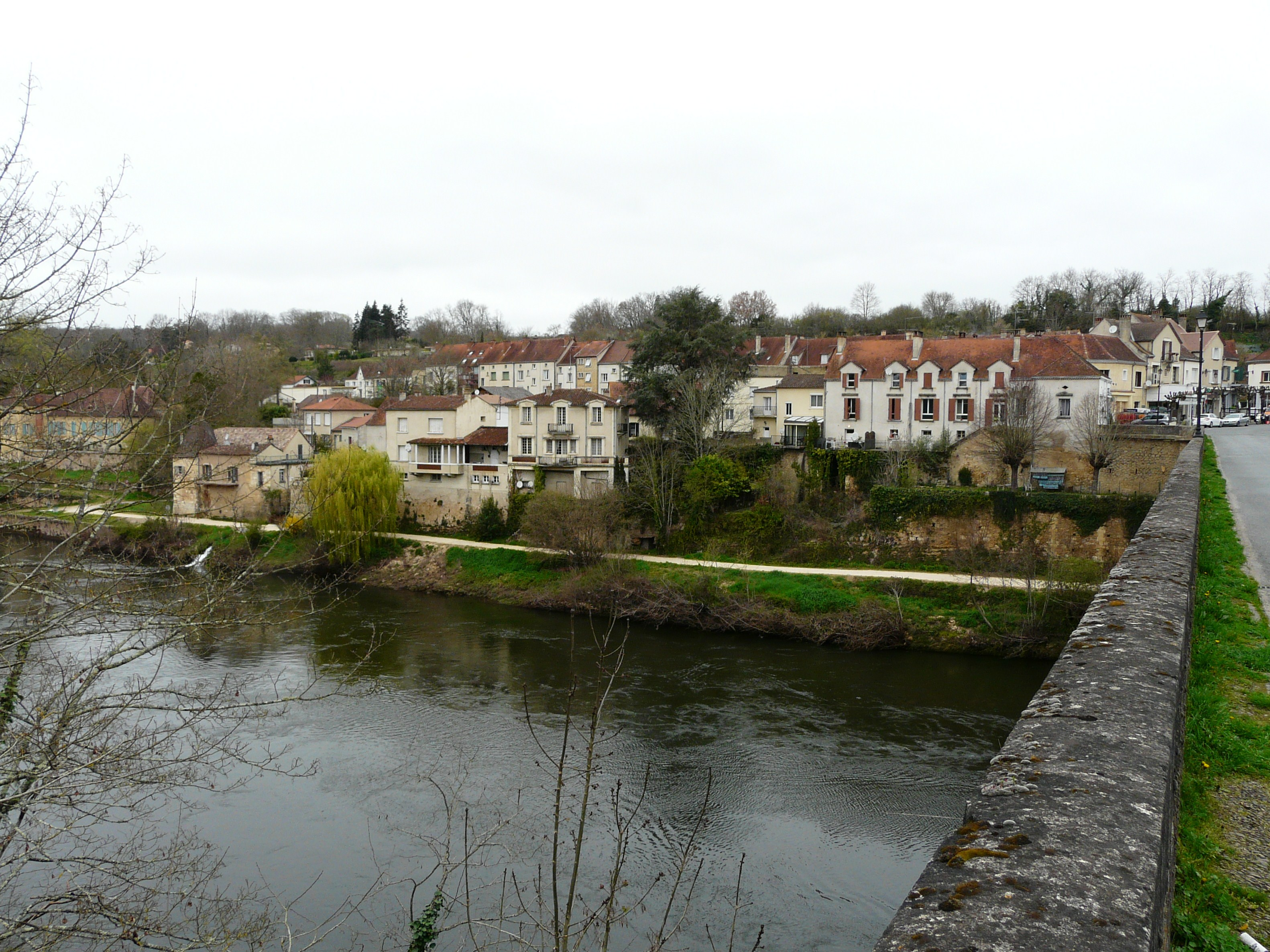
The village of Mouleydier on the banks of the Dordogne.

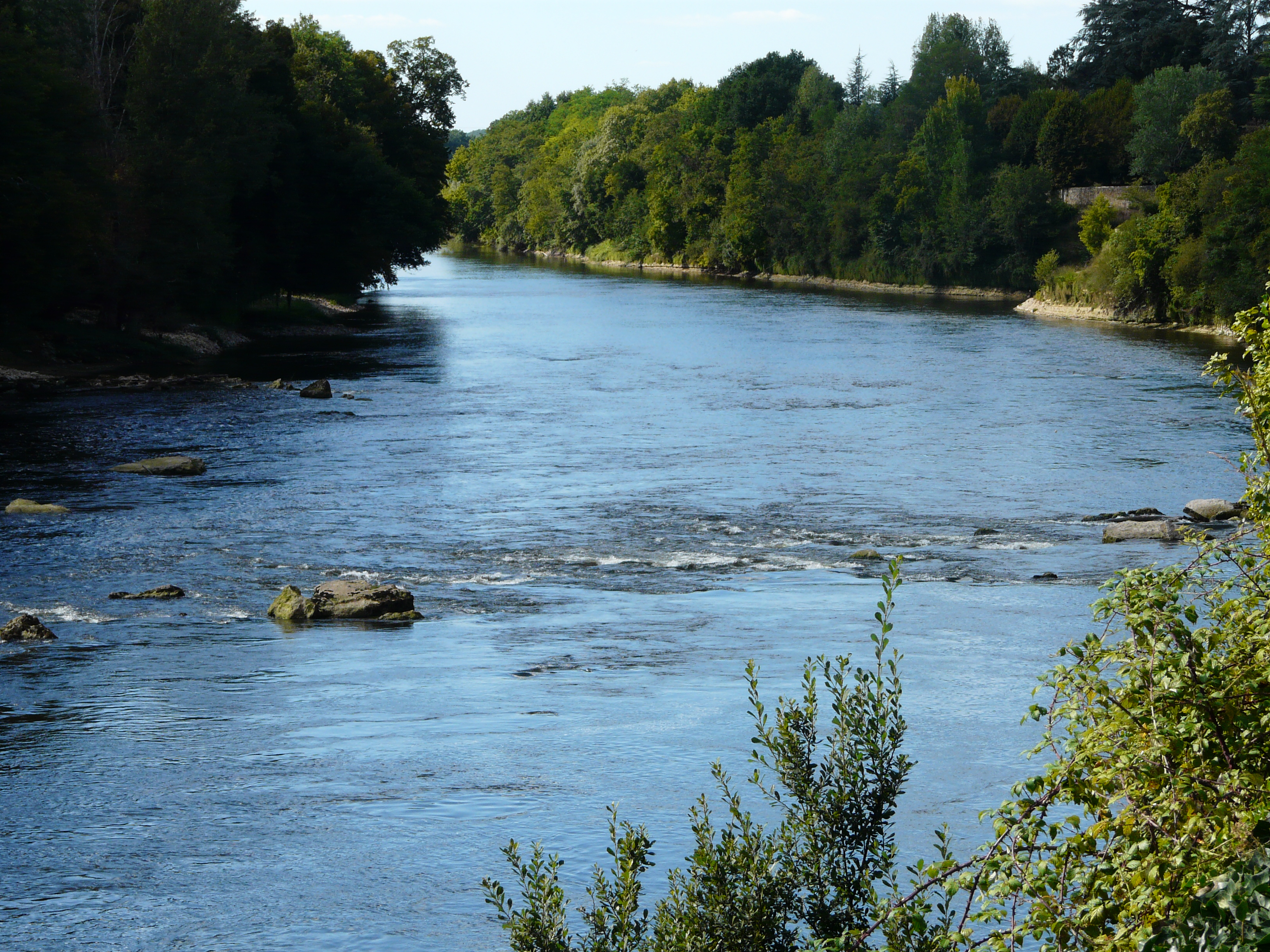
The Dordogne just downstream of the Tuilières dam, between Saint-Agne (left) and Mouleydier.

== See also ==
- Communes of the Dordogne department
