= Lamonzie-Montastruc =

- Commune
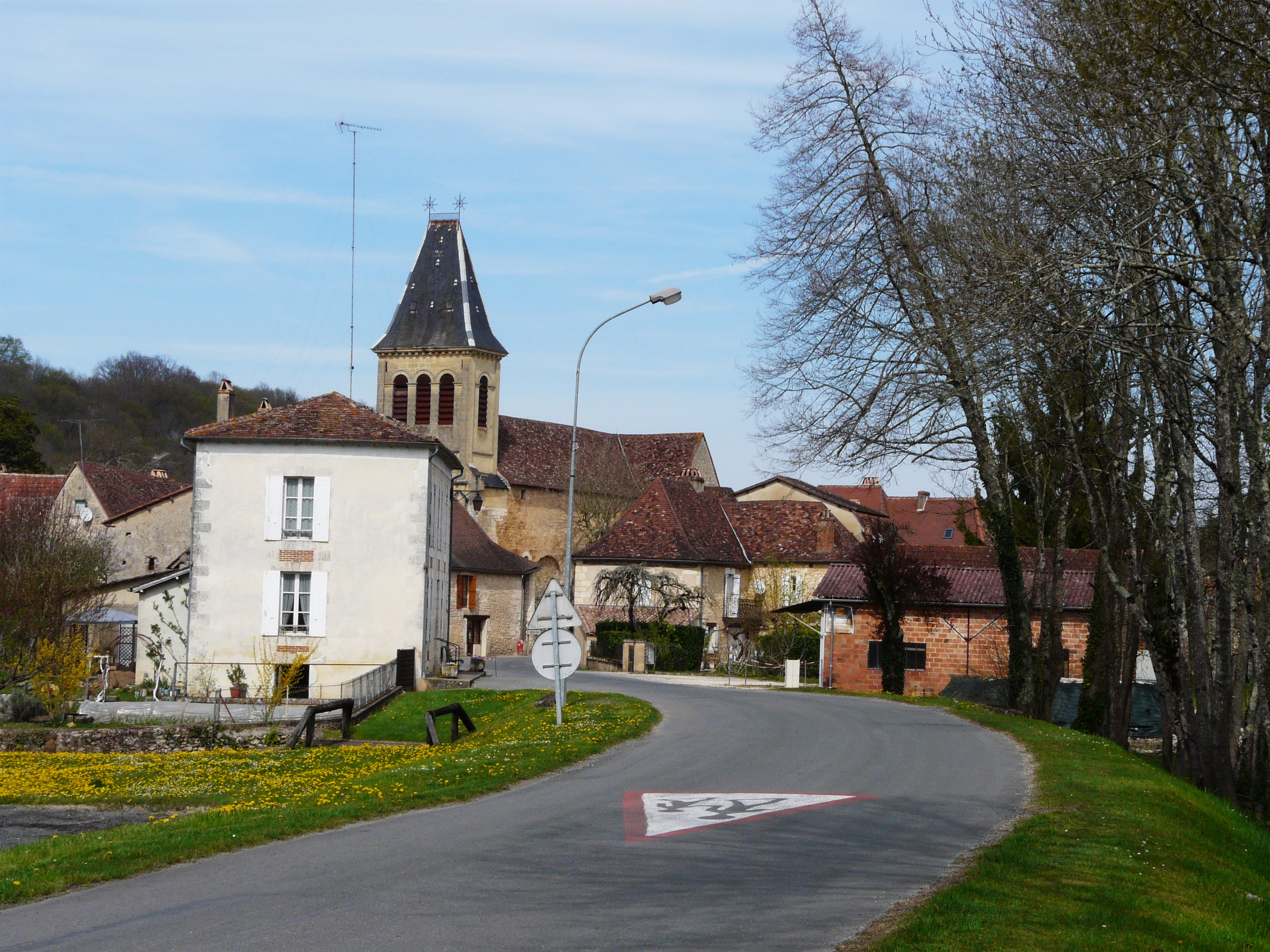
- The church and surroundings in Lamonzie-Montastruc

- Coat of arms
- Location of Lamonzie-Montastruc
- Location within France Location within Nouvelle-Aquitaine
- Coordinates: 44°53′47″N 0°35′40″E
- Country: France
- Region: Nouvelle-Aquitaine
- Department: Dordogne
- Arrondissement: Bergerac
- Canton: Bergerac-2
- Intercommunality: CA Bergeracoise

Government
  - Mayor (2020–2026): Jean-Michel Dreuil
- Area^{1}: 20.66 km^{2} (7.98 sq mi)
- Elevation: 65 m (213 ft)
- Highest elevation: 162 m (531 ft)
- Lowest elevation: 48 m (157 ft)
- Population (2023): 708
  - Density: 34.3/km^{2} (88.8/sq mi)
- Time zone: UTC+01:00 (CET)
  - Summer (DST): UTC+02:00 (CEST)
- INSEE/Postal code: 24224 /24520
- ^{1} French Land Register data, which excludes lakes, ponds, glaciers > 1 km^{2} (0.386 sq mi or 247 acres) and river estuaries.

Lamonzie-Montastruc (French pronunciation: [lamɔ̃zi mɔ̃tastʁyk]; Occitan: La Móngia de Montastruc) is a commune in the Dordogne department in Nouvelle-Aquitaine in southwestern France. It has two primary chateaux: Le Château de Montastruc, an antique troglodytic site, then a fortress, arranged progressively through its 1500 years of history, and listed as a French Historical Monument; and Le Château de Bellegarde, originating from the 14th Century, although the interiors are of the 20th century.

== Population ==
Historical population
Year	Pop.	±% p.a.
1968	351	—
1975	377	+1.03%
1982	407	+1.10%
1990	539	+3.57%
1999	531	−0.17%
2007	586	+1.24%
2012	681	+3.05%
2017	709	+0.81%
2023	708	−0.02%
Source: INSEE

== See also ==
- Communes of the Dordogne department
- Château de Bellegarde (Lamonzie-Montastruc)
