= Creysse, Dordogne =

Creysse
- Commune
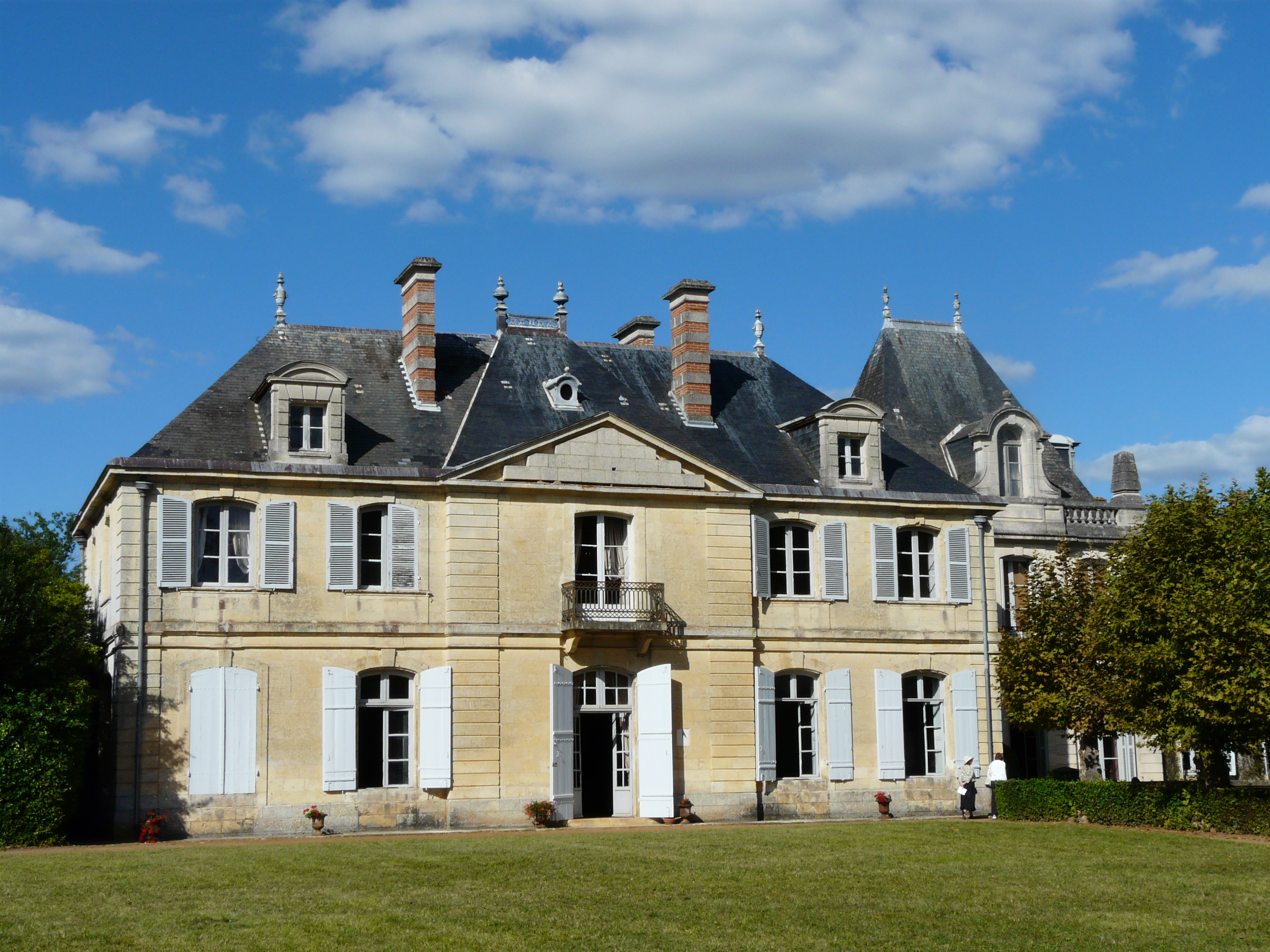
- Chateau of Tiregand
- Location of Creysse
- Location within France Location within Nouvelle-Aquitaine
- Coordinates: 44°51′24″N 0°34′00″E
- Country: France
- Region: Nouvelle-Aquitaine
- Department: Dordogne
- Arrondissement: Bergerac
- Canton: Bergerac-2
- Intercommunality: CA Bergeracoise

Government
  - Mayor (2020–2026): Frédéric Delmarès
- Area^{1}: 11.02 km^{2} (4.25 sq mi)
- Elevation: 40 m (130 ft)
- Highest elevation: 126 m (413 ft)
- Lowest elevation: 17 m (56 ft)
- Population (2023): 1,743
  - Density: 158.2/km^{2} (409.7/sq mi)
- Time zone: UTC+01:00 (CET)
  - Summer (DST): UTC+02:00 (CEST)
- INSEE/Postal code: 24145 /24100
- ^{1} French Land Register data, which excludes lakes, ponds, glaciers > 1 km^{2} (0.386 sq mi or 247 acres) and river estuaries.

Creysse (French pronunciation: [kʁɛs]; Occitan: Creissa) is a commune in the Dordogne department in Nouvelle-Aquitaine in southwestern France.

== Population ==
Historical population
Year	Pop.	±% p.a.
1968	2,171	—
1975	1,797	−2.66%
1982	1,897	+0.78%
1990	2,336	+2.64%
1999	2,260	−0.37%
2007	1,841	−2.53%
2012	1,802	−0.43%
2017	1,740	−0.70%
2023	1,743	+0.03%
Source: INSEE

== See also ==
- Communes of the Dordogne department
