= Queyssac =

- Commune
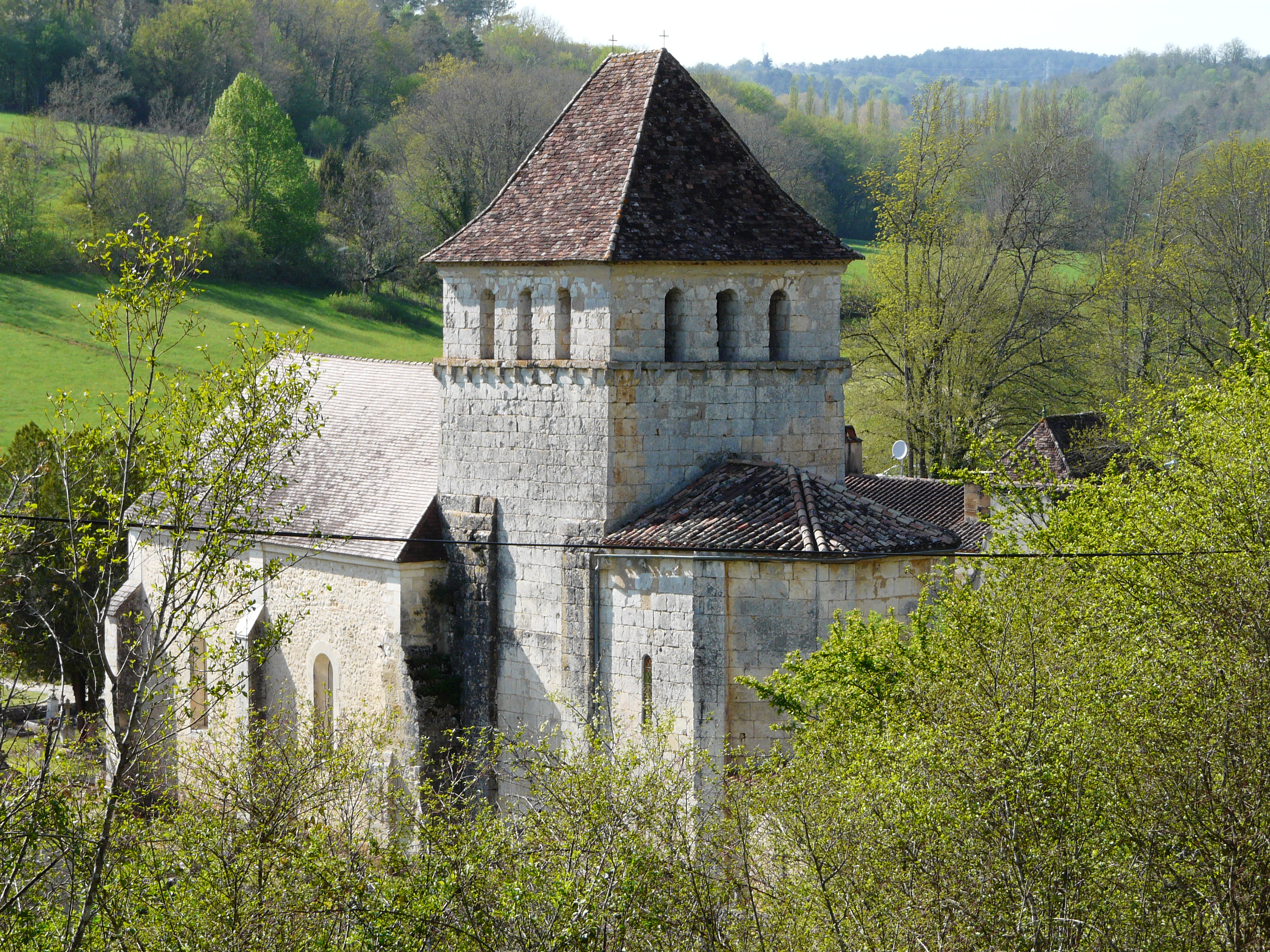
- The church in Queyssac
- Location of Queyssac
- Location within France Location within Nouvelle-Aquitaine
- Coordinates: 44°54′23″N 0°33′03″E
- Country: France
- Region: Nouvelle-Aquitaine
- Department: Dordogne
- Arrondissement: Bergerac
- Canton: Bergerac-2
- Intercommunality: CA Bergeracoise

Government
  - Mayor (2023–2026): Maryse Roche
- Area^{1}: 12.35 km^{2} (4.77 sq mi)
- Elevation: 130 m (430 ft)
- Highest elevation: 173 m (568 ft)
- Lowest elevation: 50 m (160 ft)
- Population (2023): 533
  - Density: 43.2/km^{2} (112/sq mi)
- Time zone: UTC+01:00 (CET)
  - Summer (DST): UTC+02:00 (CEST)
- INSEE/Postal code: 24345 /24140
- ^{1} French Land Register data, which excludes lakes, ponds, glaciers > 1 km^{2} (0.386 sq mi or 247 acres) and river estuaries.

Queyssac (French pronunciation: [kesak]; Occitan: Caissac) is a commune in the Dordogne department in Nouvelle-Aquitaine in southwestern France.

== Population ==
Historical population
Year	Pop.	±% p.a.
1968	256	—
1975	289	+1.75%
1982	363	+3.31%
1990	439	+2.40%
1999	462	+0.57%
2007	463	+0.03%
2012	466	+0.13%
2017	466	+0.00%
2023	533	+2.26%
Source: INSEE

== See also ==
- Communes of the Dordogne department
