= Saint-Sauveur, Dordogne =

Saint-Sauveur
- Commune
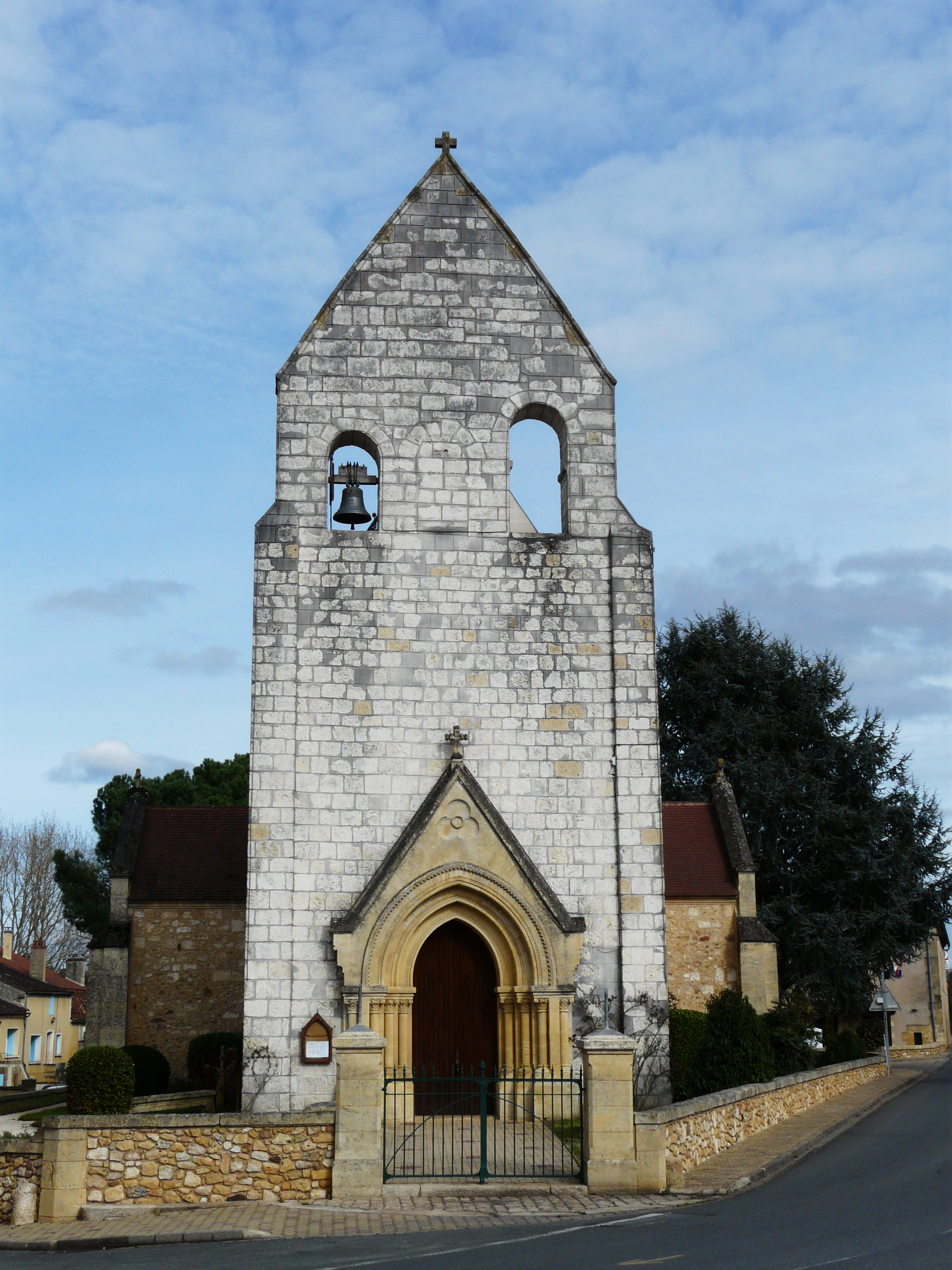
- The church in Saint-Sauveur

- Coat of arms
- Location of Saint-Sauveur
- Location within France Location within Nouvelle-Aquitaine
- Coordinates: 44°52′07″N 0°35′11″E
- Country: France
- Region: Nouvelle-Aquitaine
- Department: Dordogne
- Arrondissement: Bergerac
- Canton: Bergerac-2
- Intercommunality: CA Bergeracoise

Government
  - Mayor (2020–2026): Roland Fray
- Area^{1}: 9.31 km^{2} (3.59 sq mi)
- Elevation: 106 m (348 ft)
- Highest elevation: 141 m (463 ft)
- Lowest elevation: 50 m (160 ft)
- Population (2023): 849
  - Density: 91.2/km^{2} (236/sq mi)
- Time zone: UTC+01:00 (CET)
  - Summer (DST): UTC+02:00 (CEST)
- INSEE/Postal code: 24499 /24520
- ^{1} French Land Register data, which excludes lakes, ponds, glaciers > 1 km^{2} (0.386 sq mi or 247 acres) and river estuaries.

Saint-Sauveur (French pronunciation: [sɛ̃ sovœʁ]; Occitan: Sent Salvador) is a commune in the Dordogne department in Nouvelle-Aquitaine in southwestern France.

== Population ==
Historical population
Year	Pop.	±% p.a.
1968	334	—
1975	420	+3.33%
1982	529	+3.35%
1990	605	+1.69%
1999	606	+0.02%
2007	751	+2.72%
2012	802	+1.32%
2017	847	+1.10%
2023	849	+0.04%
Source: INSEE

== See also ==
- Communes of the Dordogne department
