= Pécharmant =

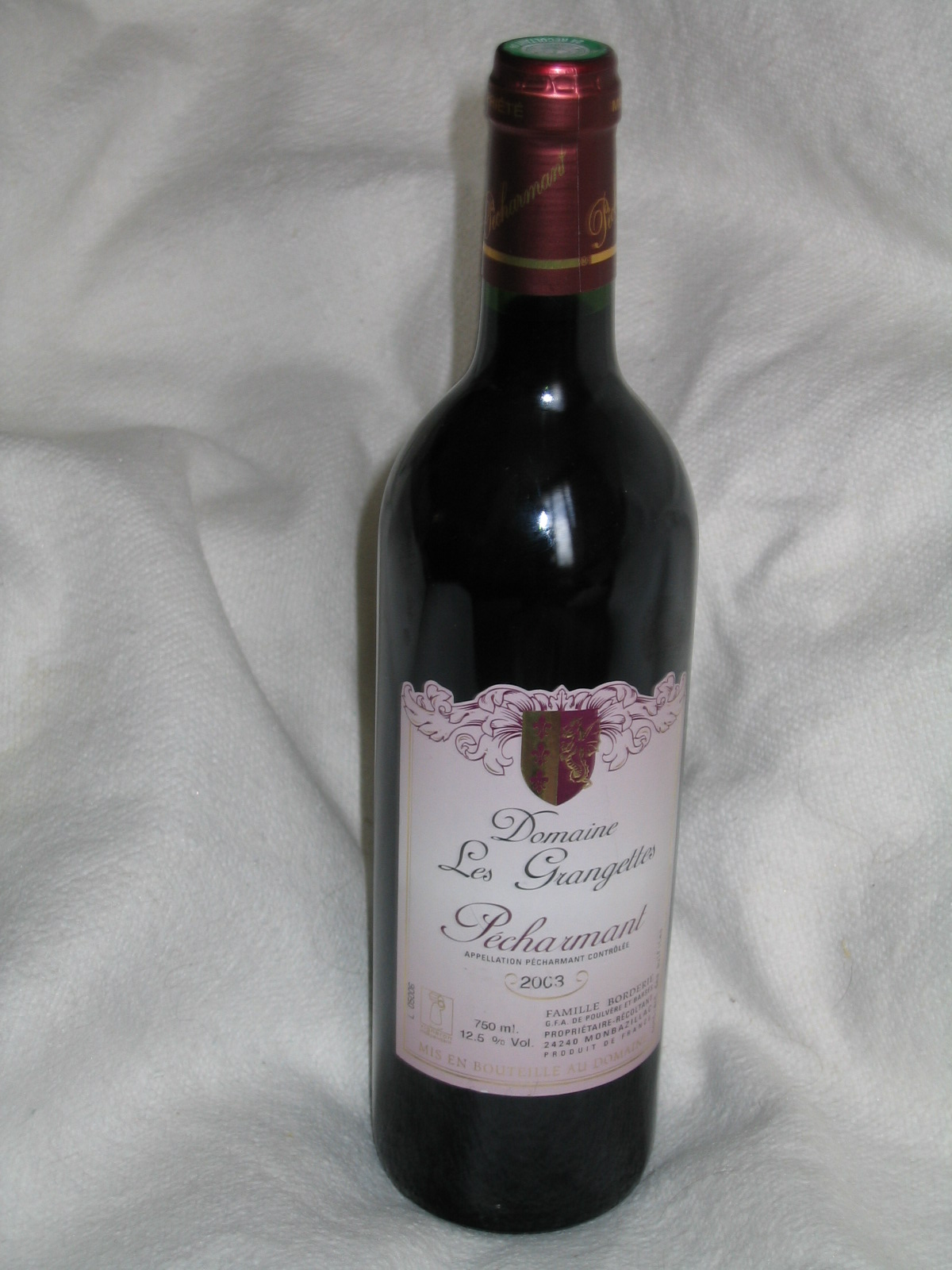
A bottle of Pécharmant

Pécharmant (French pronunciation: [peʃaʁmɑ̃]) is a wine appellation (Appellation d'origine contrôlée, AOC) for certain wines produced in the hills to the North-East of the market town of Bergerac, France. With a surface area of 400 hectares, the communes of Bergerac, Creysse, and Lembras produce nearly 15 000 hectolitres of red wine. Pécharmant is the best known of the Dordogne region wines and has been classified AOC since 1936. The identification "Pécharmant" dates from 1946 and the new AOC on 13 March 1992.

== History ==
First produced in the eleventh century, Pécharmant is the oldest collective of vineyards in the region of Bergerac. "Pécharmant" comes from the words "Pech" ( "Hill") and "Charmant" (Charming), thus meaning "the charming hill." Pécharmant vineyards are well exposed to the sun and the soil consists of sand and gravel from the Périgord, and contains a deep layer of ferruginous clay called "Tran."

== Grapes and wine style ==
Pécharmant is a blend of four grape varieties, Merlot, Cabernet Sauvignon, Cabernet Franc and Malbec. These varieties produce a wine suitable for holding from four to ten years, typically tannic and full-bodied, ruby colored with fruity aromas, that can be served with game, Périgord charcuterie, confits, duck, red meats and strong cheeses. The land used for growing Pécharmant was previously used to grow grapes for producing Rosette, a delicate white wine produced in the Bergerac region.

== List of Wineries in Pécharmant Region ==
- Chateau Beauportail
- Chateau de Tiregand
- Château Pécharmant Corbiac
