= Lycée Polyvalent Mixte Maine de Biran =

French high school

Coordinates: 44.856°N 0.473°E

Lycée Maine de Biran

Lycée Polyvalent Mixte Maine de Biran is a lycée or high school in the town of Bergerac in the Aquitaine region of France. As a polyvalent lycée, the school offers students the possibility of studying for either a général or téchnologique baccalauréat. The school campus is located on Rue Valette in the west of the town, and is spread over more than 11 acres and includes 2 teaching buildings, 2 dormitory buildings, a building housing two canteens, a gymnasium and an administration building. It is the biggest only polyvalent lycée in the south west Dordogne, excluding the nearby private school, Institution Sainte Marthe - Saint Front on Avenue Pasteur in the north of the town. There are several other smaller lycées in Bergerac and the surrounding towns. The estimated student body is 1700.
