= Arboretum de Podestat =

Arboretum in Dordogne, Aquitaine, France

Coordinates: 44.85°N 0.483°E

The Arboretum de Podestat (4 hectares) is a private arboretum located in Podestat, on the northern outskirts of Bergerac, Dordogne, Aquitaine, France. It is open by appointment; admission is free.

The arboretum was established circa 2000, and now contains a nationally recognized collection of miscanthus, as well as oaks, hornbeams, and various plants from Asia.

== See also ==
- List of botanical gardens in France
