= Hôtel de Ville, Bergerac =

Town hall in Bergerac, France

Hôtel de Ville
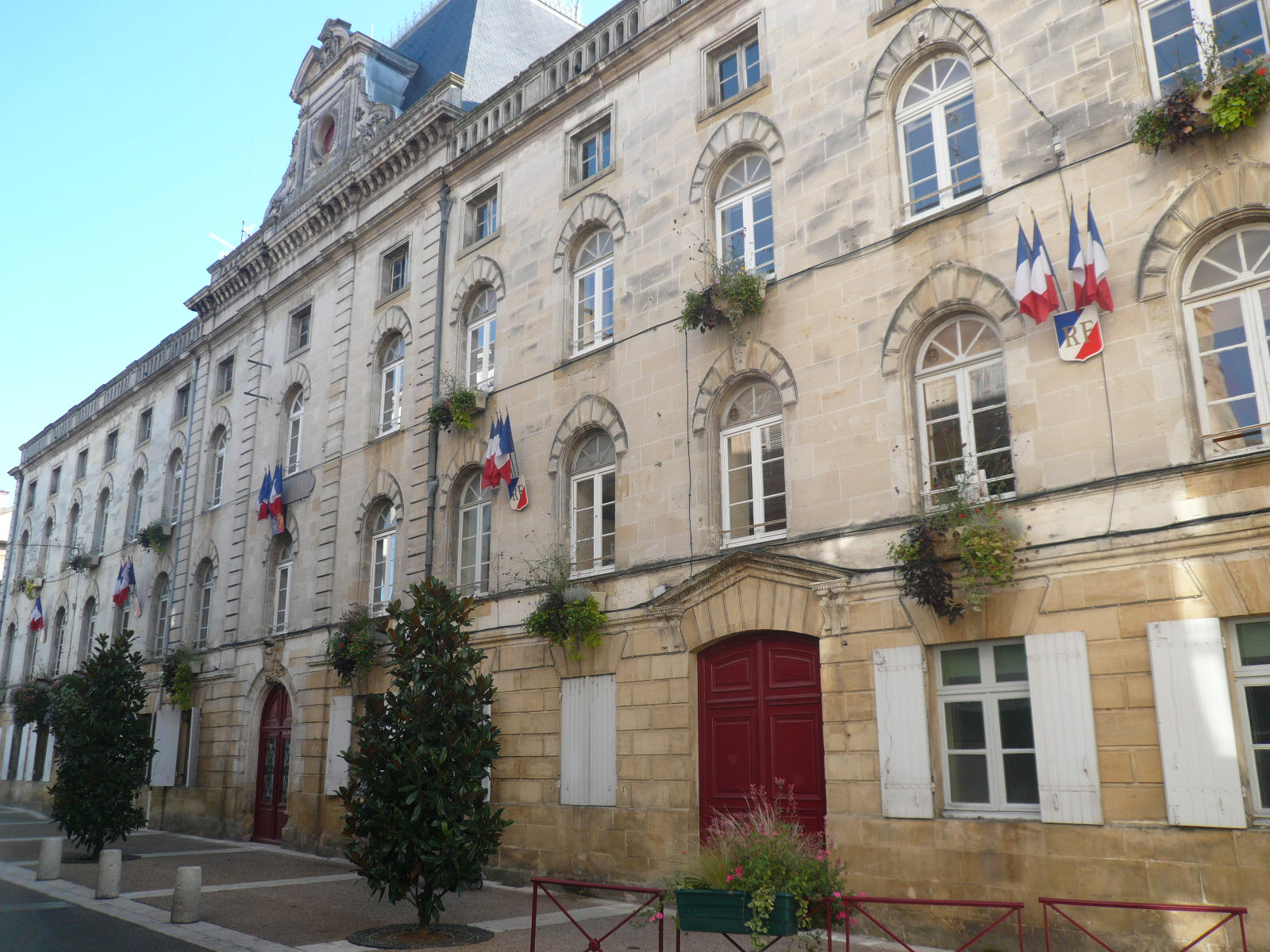
- The main frontage of the Hôtel de Ville in October 2008
- Interactive map of the Hôtel de Ville area

General information
- Type: City hall
- Architectural style: Neoclassical style
- Location: Bergerac, France
- Coordinates: 44.8501°N 0.4847°E
- Completed: 1795

The Hôtel de Ville (French pronunciation: [otɛl də vil], City Hall) is a municipal building in Bergerac, Dordogne, in southwestern France, standing on Rue Neuve d'Argenson.

== History ==
The consuls established their first town hall, under the ancien régime, in the Hostal du Consulat (the consuls' house) in Place de la Halle (now Place Malbec). It continued to be used until the early 20th century, when it ceased to be suitable for municipal use and was demolished.

In the early 20th century, following significant population growth, the town council decided to acquire a more substantial building. The building they selected was a former hospital on the east side of Rue Neuve d'Argenson. The site had originally accommodated the Maison des Dames de la Foi, an old convent established in 1678. Following the French Revolution, the convent was seized by the state and the nuns were driven out. Then, in 1794, the National Convention sent the politician, Joseph Lakanal, to the town to re-organise the hospital services. Lakanal ordered the demolition of the convent and commissioned a new hospital on the site.

The hospital was designed in the neoclassical style, built in ashlar stone and was completed in around 1795. The design involved a symmetrical main frontage of 15 bays facing onto Rue Neuve d'Argenson. The central section of three bays featured a round headed doorway with an archivolt and a keystone. The doorway was flanked by casement windows with voussoirs. The first and second floors were fenestrated by round headed windows with voussoirs and keystones, while the third floor was fenestrated by small square-shaped windows. The central section was surmounted by an entablature, a parapet and a central pediment supported by scrolls and containing an oculus. After the hospital authorities relocated to a new building on what is now Boulevard du Professeur Albert Calmette in 1895, the council acquired the old hospital building and converted it for municipal use in 1904.

During the First world War, after the building used by Collège Henri IV on Rue Lakanal was requisitioned for use as a military hospital, the mayor, Joseph Passerieux, invited the college authorities to occupy part of the town hall.

In May 2006, the town hall was the venue for an important speech by the Prime Minister of France, Dominique de Villepin, in which he launched the government's health plan, entitled "Solidarité grand âge" (solidarity for the elderly), and announced proposals for a large number of new hospital places throughout the country. Following the demolition of an adjacent property, the Maison Leydier, a landscaped garden, referred to as the garden of the Hôtel de Ville, was opened to the public in May 2024.
