= Canton of Bergerac-1 =

Coordinates: 44.86°N 0.48°E

The canton of Bergerac-1 is an administrative division of the Dordogne department, southwestern France. Its borders were modified at the French canton reorganization which came into effect in March 2015. Its seat is in Bergerac.

It consists of the following communes:

1. Bergerac (partly)
