= Saint-Germain-et-Mons =

- Commune
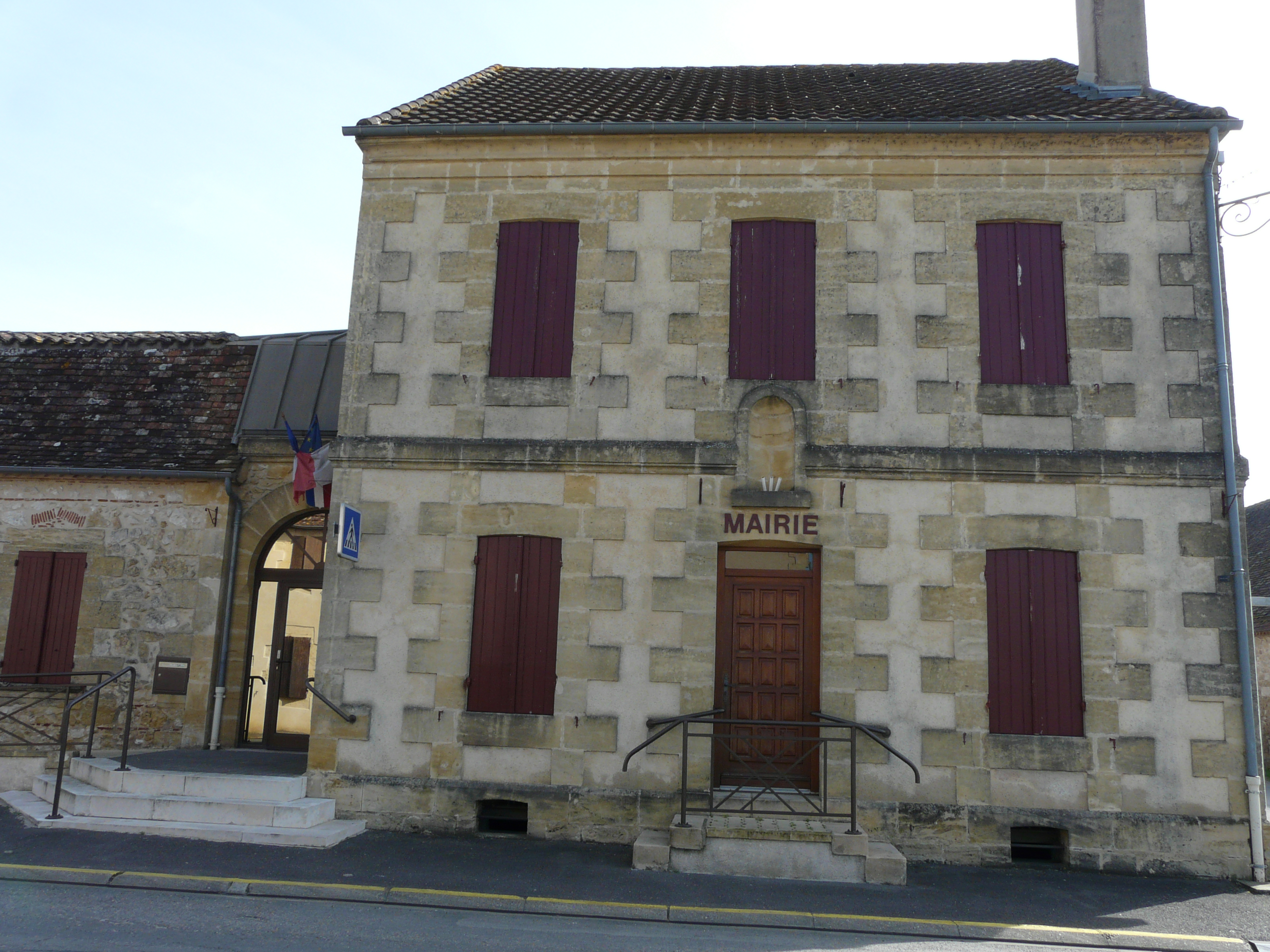
- The town hall in Saint-Germain-et-Mons

- Coat of arms
- Location of Saint-Germain-et-Mons
- Location within France Location within Nouvelle-Aquitaine
- Coordinates: 44°50′43″N 0°35′42″E
- Country: France
- Region: Nouvelle-Aquitaine
- Department: Dordogne
- Arrondissement: Bergerac
- Canton: Bergerac-2
- Intercommunality: CA Bergeracoise

Government
  - Mayor (2020–2026): Michelle Dorange
- Area^{1}: 14.13 km^{2} (5.46 sq mi)
- Elevation: 45 m (148 ft)
- Highest elevation: 133 m (436 ft)
- Lowest elevation: 17 m (56 ft)
- Population (2023): 908
  - Density: 64.3/km^{2} (166/sq mi)
- Time zone: UTC+01:00 (CET)
  - Summer (DST): UTC+02:00 (CEST)
- INSEE/Postal code: 24419 /24520
- ^{1} French Land Register data, which excludes lakes, ponds, glaciers > 1 km^{2} (0.386 sq mi or 247 acres) and river estuaries.

Saint-Germain-et-Mons (French pronunciation: [sɛ̃ ʒɛʁmɛ̃ e mɔ̃s]; Occitan: Sent Germa e Monts) is a commune in the Dordogne department in Nouvelle-Aquitaine in southwestern France.

== Population ==
Historical population
| Year | Pop. | ±% p.a. |
|---|---|---|
| 1968 | 464 | — |
| 1975 | 455 | −0.28% |
| 1982 | 486 | +0.95% |
| 1990 | 523 | +0.92% |
| 1999 | 606 | +1.65% |
| 2007 | 713 | +2.05% |
| 2012 | 777 | +1.73% |
| 2017 | 829 | +1.30% |
| 2023 | 908 | +1.53% |
Source: INSEE

== See also ==
- Communes of the Dordogne department
