= Château de Bellegarde (Lamonzie-Montastruc) =

Castle in France

Coordinates: 44.8922°N 0.5919°E

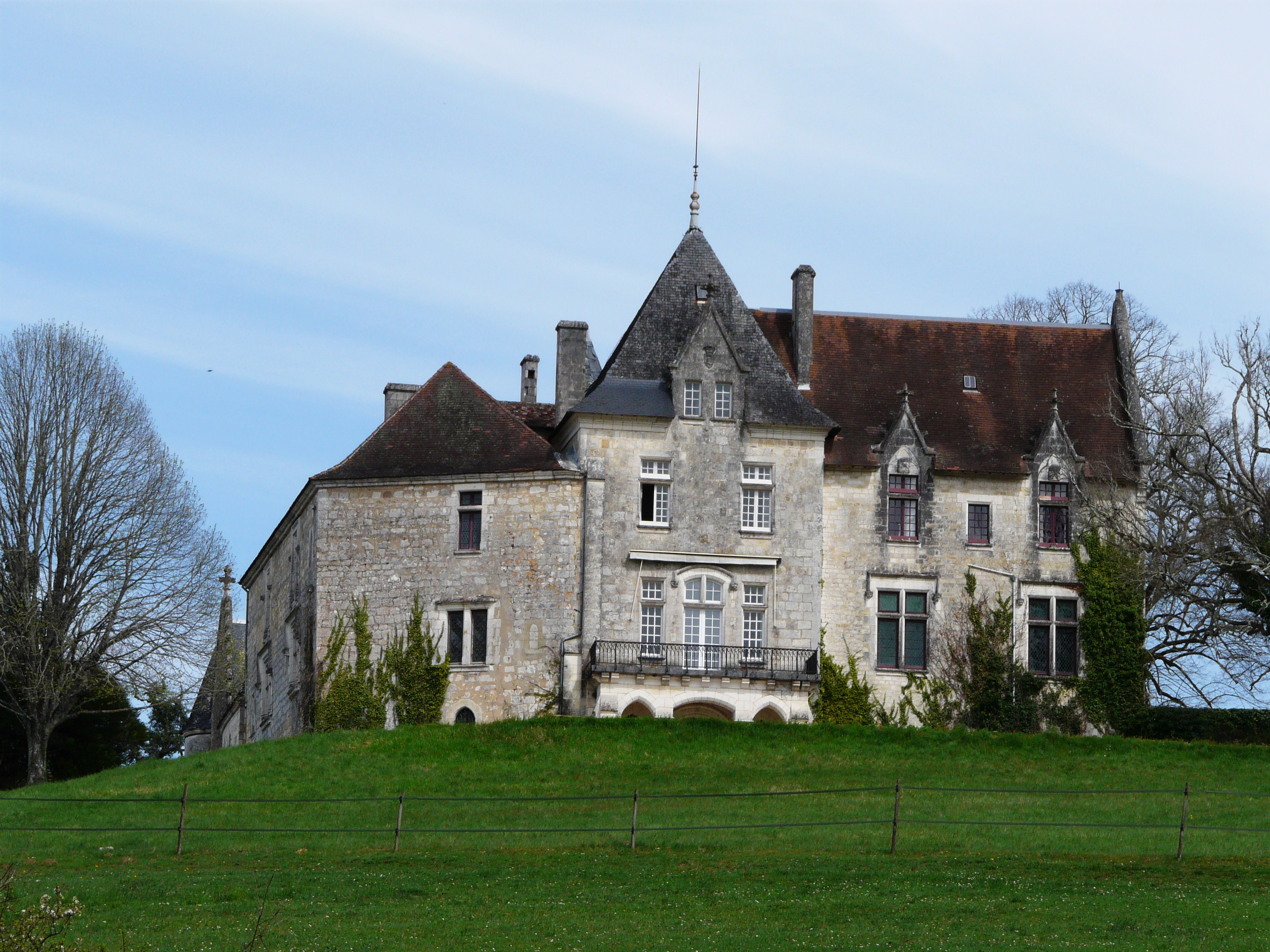

The Château de Bellegarde is a château in Lamonzie-Montastruc, Dordogne, Nouvelle-Aquitaine, France. The structure originates in the 14th century although the interiors are of the 20th century. It has been a listed historical monument since 2006.
