= Cours-de-Pile =

- Commune
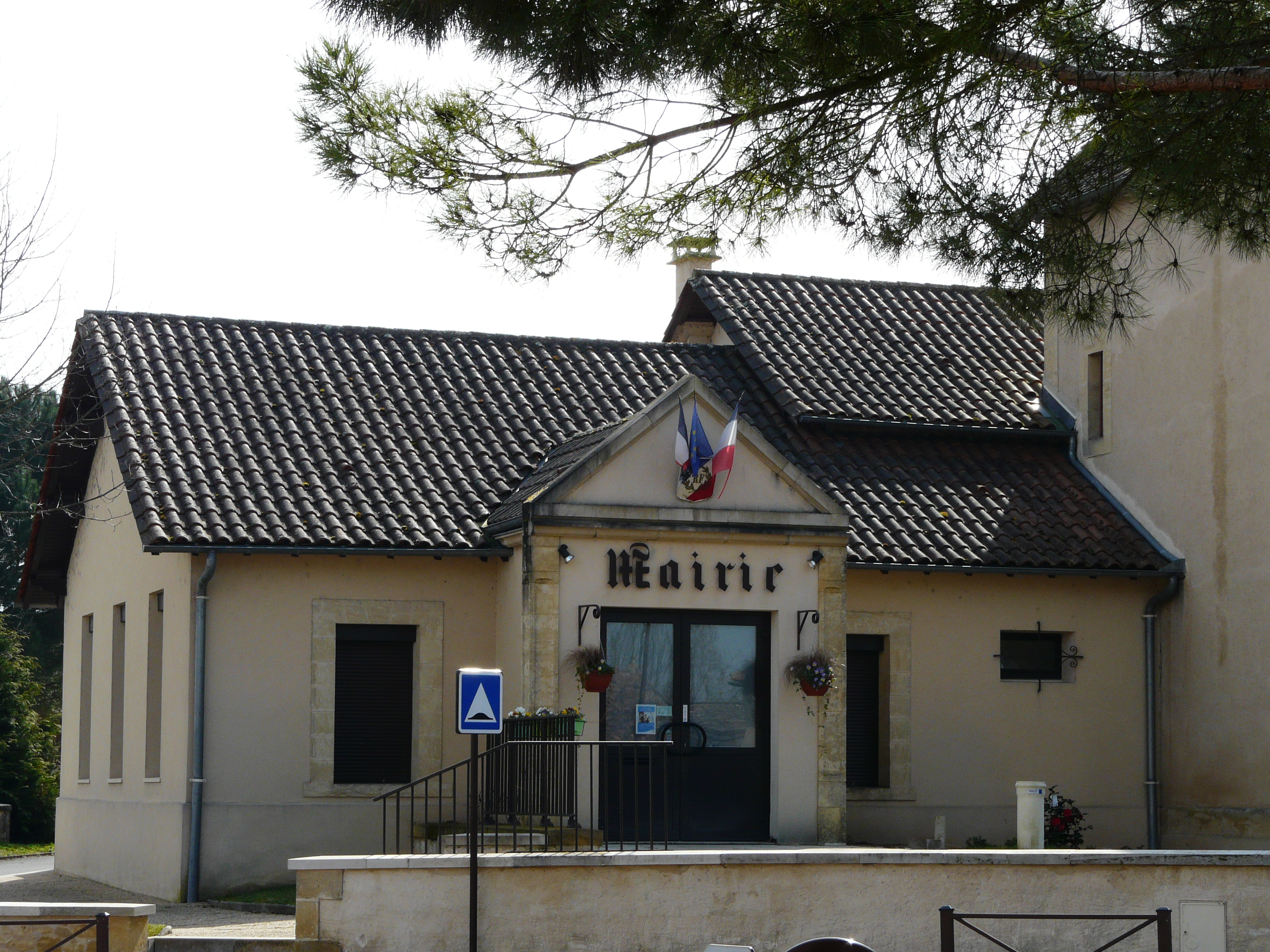
- The town hall in Cours-de-Pile

- Coat of arms
- Location of Cours-de-Pile
- Location within France Location within Nouvelle-Aquitaine
- Coordinates: 44°50′32″N 0°32′49″E
- Country: France
- Region: Nouvelle-Aquitaine
- Department: Dordogne
- Arrondissement: Bergerac
- Canton: Bergerac-2
- Intercommunality: CA Bergeracoise

Government
  - Mayor (2020–2026): Didier Capuron
- Area^{1}: 10.81 km^{2} (4.17 sq mi)
- Elevation: 44 m (144 ft)
- Highest elevation: 101 m (331 ft)
- Lowest elevation: 17 m (56 ft)
- Population (2023): 1,585
  - Density: 146.6/km^{2} (379.8/sq mi)
- Time zone: UTC+01:00 (CET)
  - Summer (DST): UTC+02:00 (CEST)
- INSEE/Postal code: 24140 /24520
- ^{1} French Land Register data, which excludes lakes, ponds, glaciers > 1 km^{2} (0.386 sq mi or 247 acres) and river estuaries.

Cours-de-Pile (French pronunciation: [kuʁ də pil]; Occitan: Cors de Pilas) is a commune in the Dordogne department in Nouvelle-Aquitaine in southwestern France.

== Population ==
Historical population
Year	Pop.	±% p.a.
1968	628	—
1975	868	+4.73%
1982	1,203	+4.77%
1990	1,329	+1.25%
1999	1,300	−0.24%
2007	1,431	+1.21%
2012	1,531	+1.36%
2017	1,578	+0.61%
2023	1,585	+0.07%
Source: INSEE

== See also ==
- Communes of the Dordogne department
