= Monbazillac =

- Commune
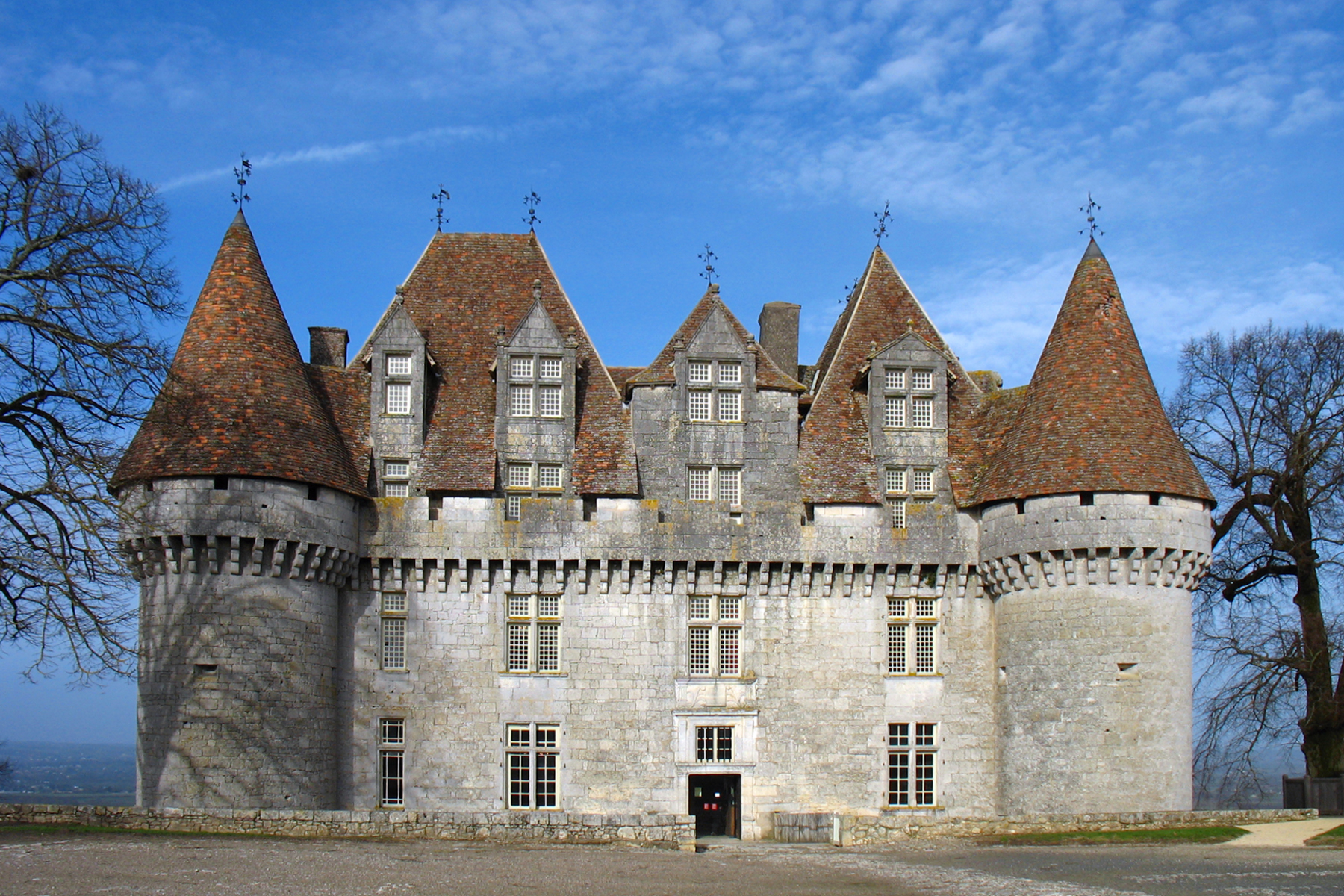
- Château de Monbazillac

- Coat of arms
- Location of Monbazillac
- Location within France Location within Nouvelle-Aquitaine
- Coordinates: 44°47′42″N 0°29′33″E
- Country: France
- Region: Nouvelle-Aquitaine
- Department: Dordogne
- Arrondissement: Bergerac
- Canton: Sud-Bergeracois
- Intercommunality: CA Bergeracoise

Government
  - Mayor (2020–2026): Pascal Prevot
- Area^{1}: 19.58 km^{2} (7.56 sq mi)
- Elevation: 160 m (520 ft)
- Highest elevation: 188 m (617 ft)
- Lowest elevation: 46 m (151 ft)
- Population (2023): 829
  - Density: 42.3/km^{2} (110/sq mi)
- Time zone: UTC+01:00 (CET)
  - Summer (DST): UTC+02:00 (CEST)
- INSEE/Postal code: 24274 /24240
- ^{1} French Land Register data, which excludes lakes, ponds, glaciers > 1 km^{2} (0.386 sq mi or 247 acres) and river estuaries.

Monbazillac (French pronunciation: [mɔ̃bazijak]; Occitan: Montbasalhac) is a commune in the Dordogne department in Nouvelle-Aquitaine in southwestern France.

== Population ==
Historical population
Year	Pop.	±% p.a.
1968	846	—
1975	789	−0.99%
1982	831	+0.74%
1990	902	+1.03%
1999	899	−0.04%
2007	957	+0.78%
2012	909	−1.02%
2017	829	−1.83%
2023	829	+0.00%
Source: INSEE

== See also ==
- Monbazillac AOC
- Communes of the Dordogne department
