= Monbazillac AOC =

French wine

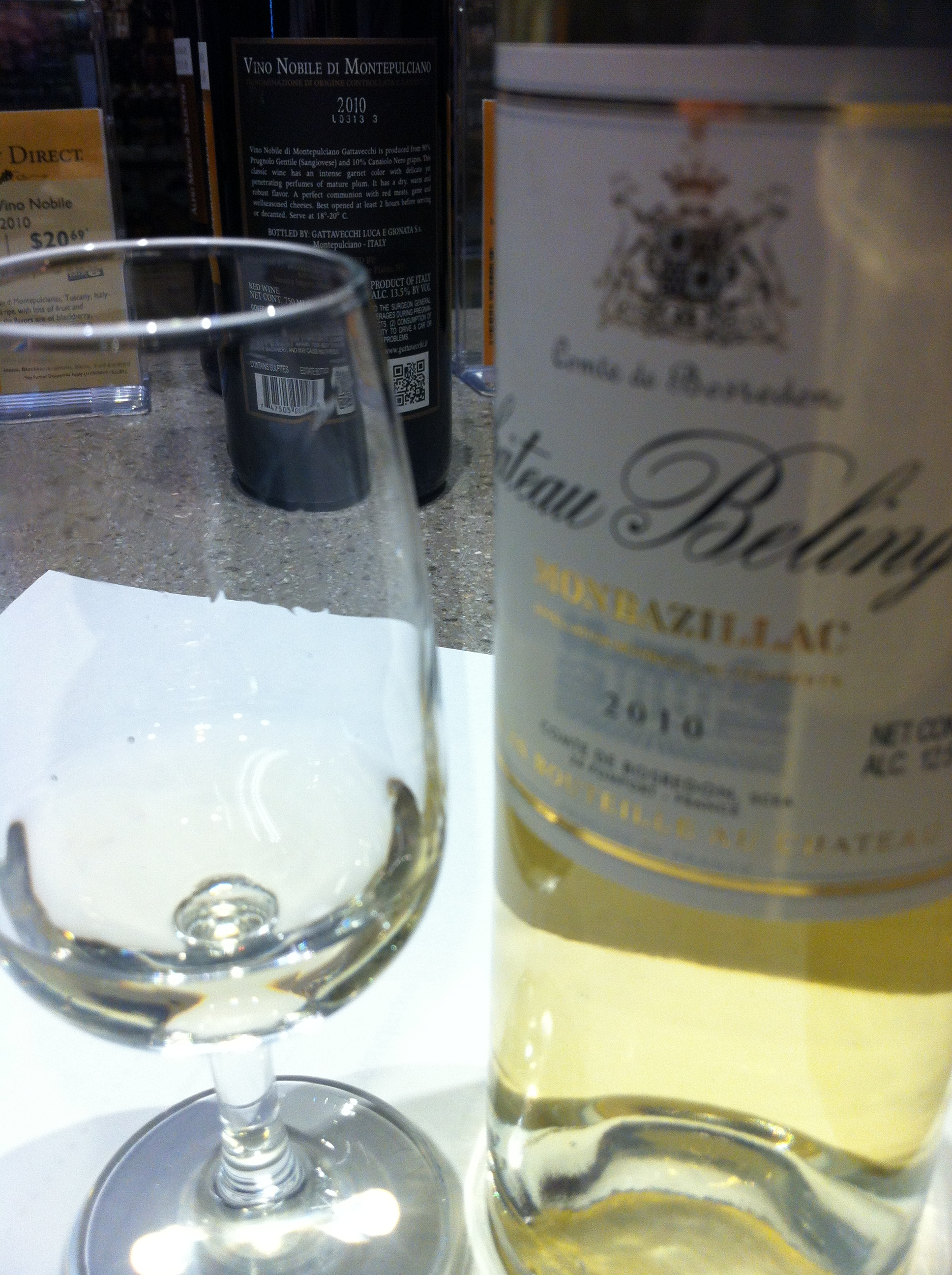
A dessert wine from the Monbazillac region

Monbazillac (French pronunciation: [mɔ̃bazijak]) is an Appellation d'Origine Contrôlée (AOC) for sweet white wine produced in the village of Monbazillac on the left bank of the Dordogne just across from the town of Bergerac in South West France. The appellation covers almost 2,000 hectares (4,900 acres) of vineyards.

== AOC zone ==
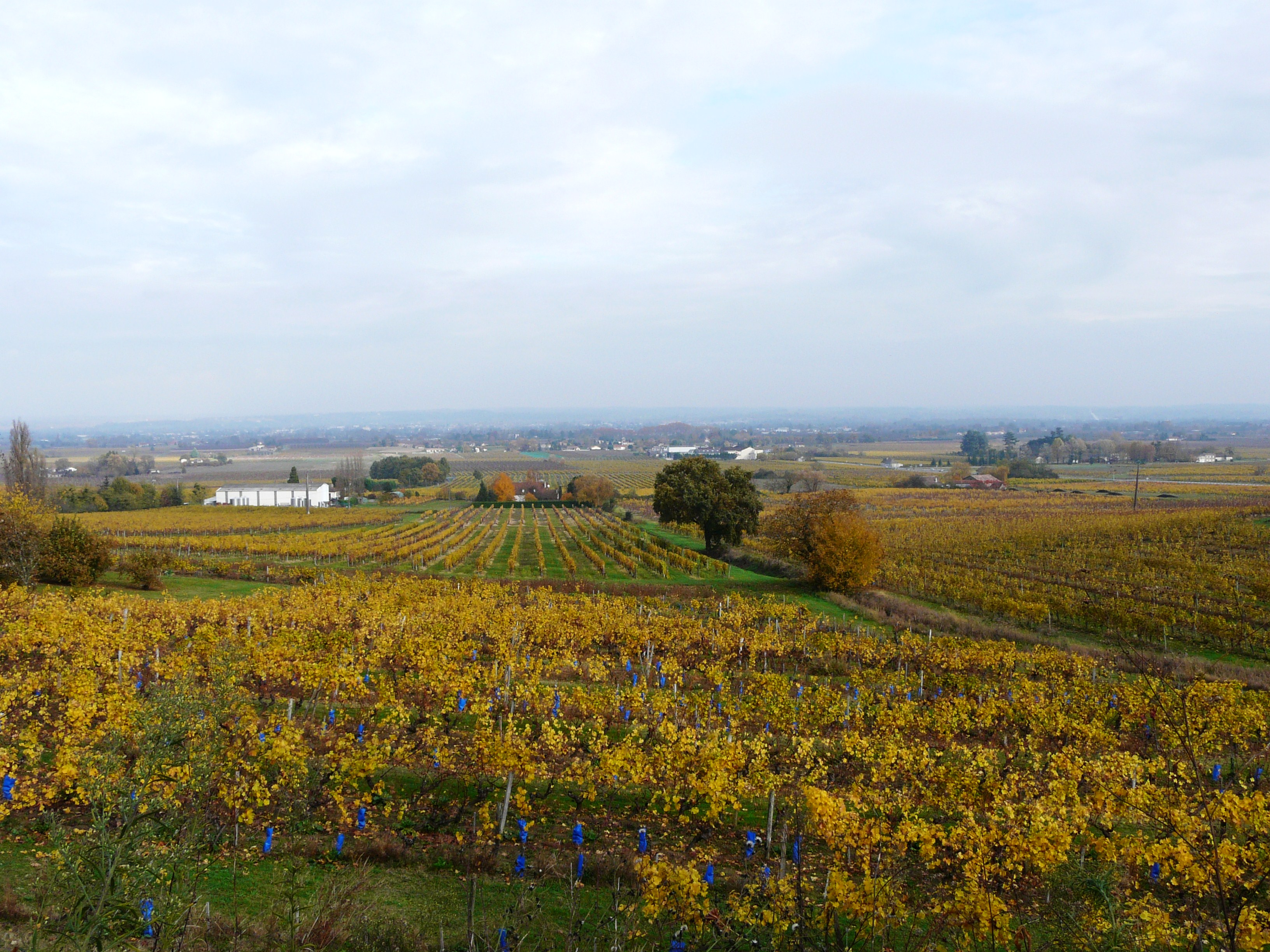
Monbazillac vineyards in the autumn

The AOC of Monbazillac was first established in 1936, but the area has a long history of sweet wine production. Only wine made from grapes grown in Monbazillac that are affected by the "noble rot" (Botrytis cinerea) can be sold under the Monbazillac designation. (Dry white wines from the same area are sold as Bergerac sec.) The grape varieties Sémillon, Sauvignon blanc and Muscadelle are used for Monbazillac, and the permitted base yield is 40 hectoliter per hectare, although actual yields are lower for many producers.

== Wines ==
Monbazillac wines are broadly similar to Sauternes, but a difference is that Monbazillac often has a significantly higher proportion of Muscadelle in the blend, which can lead to slightly different aromas. While Monbazillac in former times could be a simpler semi-sweet wine, the style in more recent years has been that of a fully botrytized wine, since 1993 no mechanical harvesting is allowed and harvesting in several tries is required.

Some wines with exceptionally high residual sugar may be designated Sélection de Grains Nobles; in these, chaptalization (the addition of sugar to be fermented) is not allowed.
