= Saint-Nexans =

- Commune
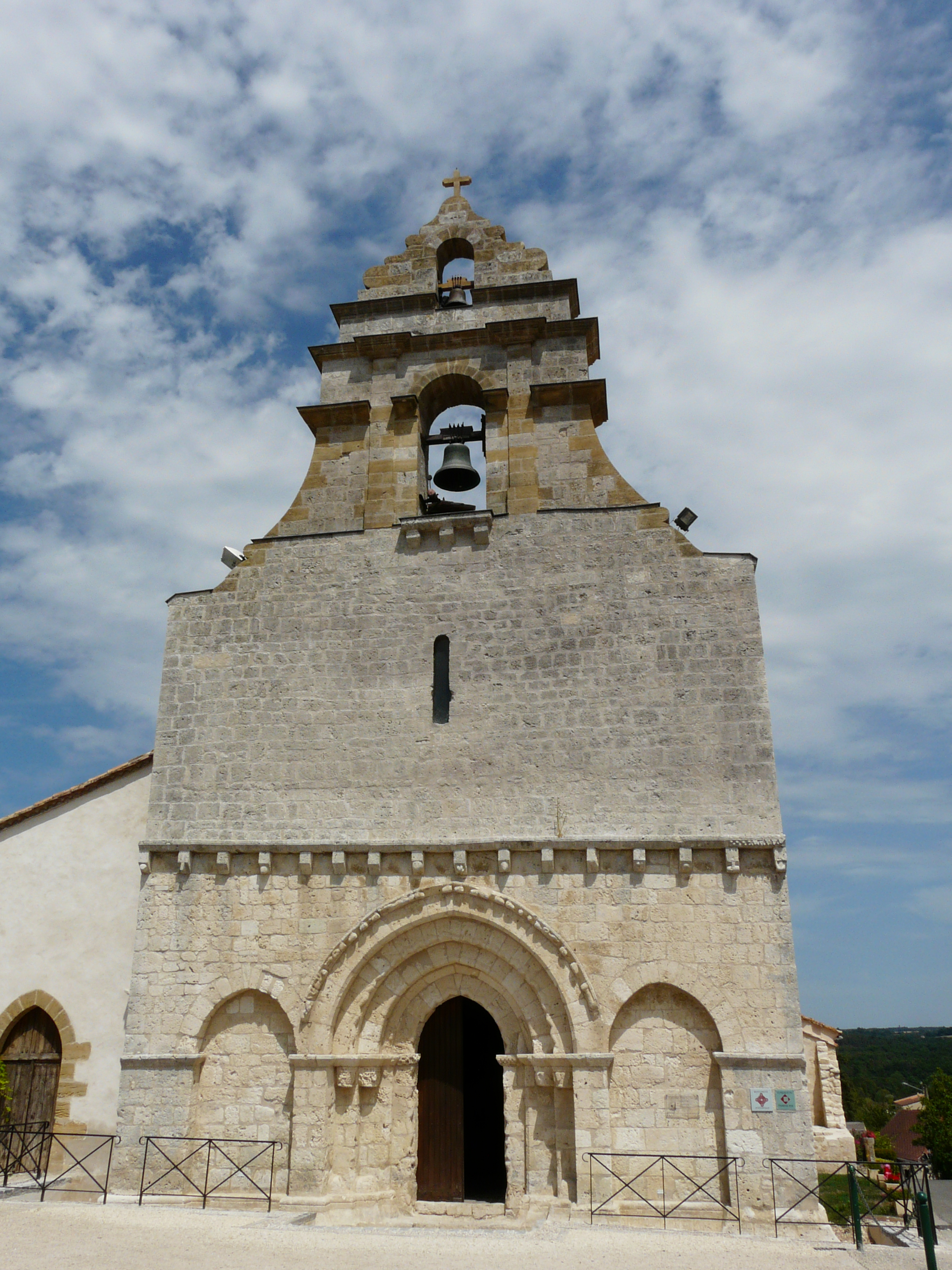
- The church in Saint-Nexans

- Coat of arms
- Location of Saint-Nexans
- Location within France Location within Nouvelle-Aquitaine
- Coordinates: 44°48′20″N 0°32′55″E
- Country: France
- Region: Nouvelle-Aquitaine
- Department: Dordogne
- Arrondissement: Bergerac
- Canton: Bergerac-2
- Intercommunality: CA Bergeracoise

Government
  - Mayor (2020–2026): Jean-François Jeante
- Area^{1}: 12.38 km^{2} (4.78 sq mi)
- Elevation: 80 m (260 ft)
- Highest elevation: 125 m (410 ft)
- Lowest elevation: 36 m (118 ft)
- Population (2023): 1,030
  - Density: 83.2/km^{2} (215/sq mi)
- Time zone: UTC+01:00 (CET)
  - Summer (DST): UTC+02:00 (CEST)
- INSEE/Postal code: 24472 /24520
- ^{1} French Land Register data, which excludes lakes, ponds, glaciers > 1 km^{2} (0.386 sq mi or 247 acres) and river estuaries.

Saint-Nexans (French pronunciation: [sɛ̃ nɛksɑ̃]; Occitan: Sent Naissent) is a commune in the Dordogne department in Nouvelle-Aquitaine in southwestern France.

== Population ==
Historical population
Year	Pop.	±% p.a.
1968	475	—
1975	538	+1.80%
1982	664	+3.05%
1990	772	+1.90%
1999	802	+0.42%
2007	851	+0.74%
2012	898	+1.08%
2017	967	+1.49%
2023	1,030	+1.06%
Source: INSEE

== See also ==
- Communes of the Dordogne department
