= Merille =

French wine grape variety

Merille is a red French wine grape variety that is grown primarily in the Garonne of South West France. It is a common grape in table wine.
