= Ségalin =

Variety of grape

- Grape (Vitis)
- Color of berry skin: Noir
- Species: Vitis vinifera
- Origin: France
- Original pedigree: Jurançon Noir × Blauer Portugieser
- Breeder: Paul Truel
- Breeding institute: Institut National de la Recherche Agronomique - Unité Expérimentale du Domaine de Vassal & Montpellier SupAgro
- Year of crossing: 1957
- VIVC number: 10857

Ségalin is a red French wine grape variety that is a crossing of Jurançon noir and Portugais. As a varietal, Ségalin has the potential to produce well structured wines.

Ségalin has no synonyms.
