= Abouriou =

Variety of grape

- Grape (Vitis)
- Color of berry skin: Noir
- Also called: Early Burgundy
- Origin: Southwest France
- Notable regions: California, France
- VIVC number: 34

Abouriou (French pronunciation: [abuʁju]; French spelling of Occitan aboriu, early) is a red French wine grape variety grown primarily in Southwest France and, in small quantities, California. It is a blending grape that, along with Malbec, Cabernet Sauvignon, Syrah, Fer, Cabernet Franc, and Merlot, is used to make the Appellation d'origine contrôlée (AOC) wine of Côtes du Marmandais. Abouriou can also be made into a varietal, as it is used in some vin de pays wines. The grape is known for its low acidity and high tannin content.

Though Abouriou shares several synonyms (alternative names other than the full botanical name) with the Beaujolais grape Gamay, their morphology differs and DNA evidence has shown the two varieties to be distinct. In California, the grape is sometimes called Early Burgundy, another allusion to Gamay. With a tendency to bud and ripen early, the vine produces high yields and vigorous growth with a relatively high resistance to most grape diseases.

== History ==
Ampelographers believe that Abouriou originated in Southwest France in the Lot-et-Garonne department, probably around the commune of Villeréal where the grape has long been associated with. The grape was once widely planted throughout the region until the phylloxera epidemic of the mid-19th century devastated the area and sharply reduced Abouriou's numbers. The grape was near extinction until a local farmer discovered abandoned plantings of the vine growing up the wall of a ruined castle outside of Villeréal. Numa Naugé, a private grape breeder from Casseneuil in Lot-et-Garonne, cultivated seedlings of Abouriou from those vines and presented them to French viticultural authorities in 1882 for conservation and propagation. Naugé's work in saving Abouriou from extinction is honored today with the alternative name Précoce Nauge.

== Relationship to other grapes ==
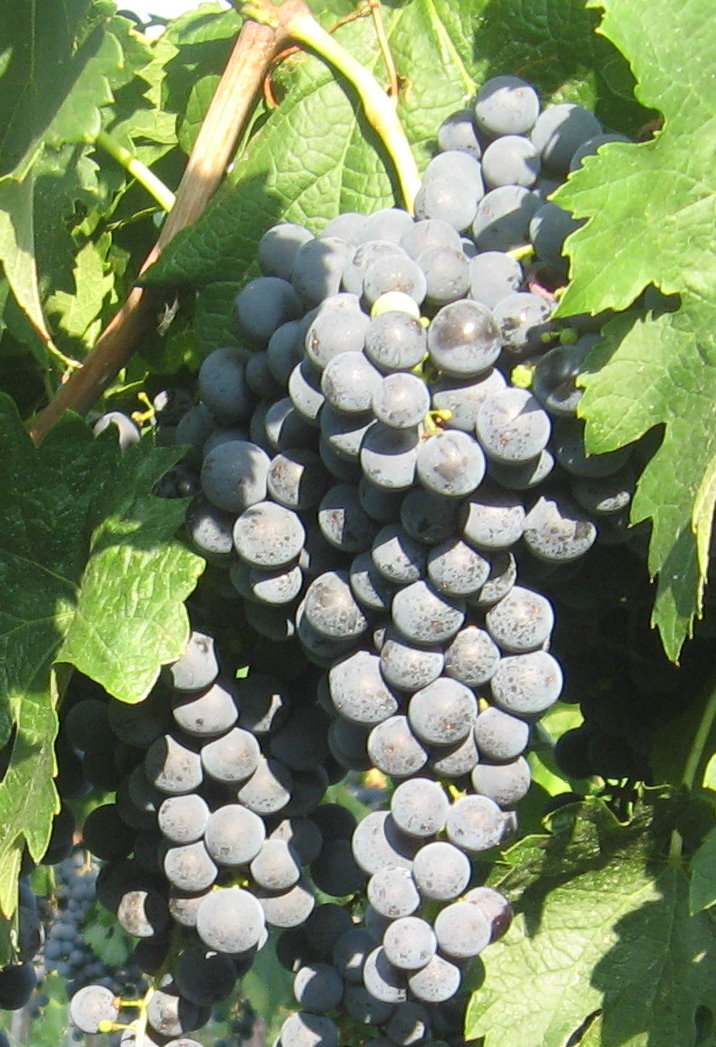
Through Magdeleine Noire des Charentes, Merlot (pictured) is either a half-sibling or grandchild of Abouriou.

Despite the similarities in synonyms to the Beaujolais wine grape Gamay, DNA evidence has confirmed that there is no direct relationship between the two grape varieties. However, testing completed in 2009 did show a potential parent-offspring relationship between Abouriou and Magdeleine Noire des Charentes though it is not yet clear which vine is the parent and which is the offspring. As Magdeleine Noire des Charentes has been confirmed as the mother vine to the notable international varieties Malbec and Merlot this means that Abouriou is either a half-sibling or grandparent to those varieties.

In the 1950s, Abouriou was crossed with Merlot to produce Ederena and with Tinta Negra Mole at the Unité Expérimentale du Domaine de Vassal & Montpellier SupAgro to produce Egiodola. In the 1970s, Abouriou was crossed with the Aveyron wine grape Castets in Slovakia at the VSSVVM Research and Breeding Station for Enology and Viticulture to produce several varieties including Hron, Nitranka, Rimava and Váh.

In California, some plantings of Abouriou (known as Early Burgundy) were discovered by DNA analysis to actually be Blauer Portugieser which has no known relation to Abouriou.

== Viticulture ==
Abouriou is an early ripening variety that has good resistance to many viticultural hazards include powdery and downy mildew as well as botrytis bunch rot.

== Wine regions ==
In 2008 there were 338 hectares (835 acres) of Abouriou planted in France. The vast majority were found in the Lot-et-Garonne department (200 hectares/494 acres) of South West France and the Loire-Atlantique department (100 hectares/247 acres) of the Loire Valley. It is a permitted variety in the Côtes du Marmandais AOC and is widely grown around the commune of Cocumont located just southwest of Marmande. It is also used as both a blending and varietal component in several vin de pays of the southwest including the 'Vin de Pays de Landes du Lot-et-Garonne that covers most of the Lot-et-Garonne department and the Vin de Pays de L'Agenais that covers the western end of the Lot-et-Garonne around the commune of Agen.

=== AOC regulations ===
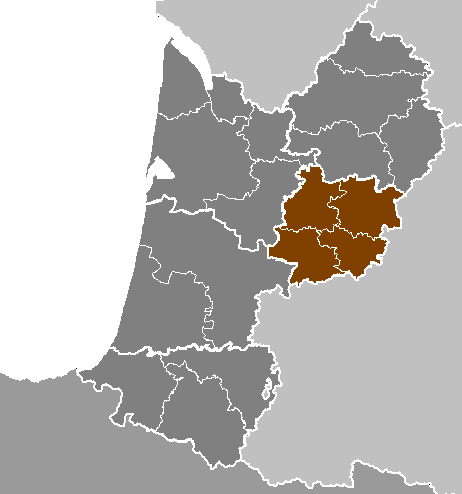
Most of the plantings of Abouriou are found in the Lot-et-Garonne department (highlighted) of Southwest France.

In the Côtes du Marmandais AOC Abouriou is permitted to be blended with Cabernet Sauvignon, Cabernet Franc, Fer, Malbec, Merlot and Syrah in the red wine produced on both sides of the Garonne river east of the Bordeaux wine region. Grapes destined for AOC product must be harvested to a yield no greater than 56 hectoliters/hectares ( ≈ 3 tons/acre) with the finished wine needing to attain a minimum alcohol level of at least 10%.

When the AOC of Cahors was first established, Abouriou was a permitted secondary variety along with Valdiguié, Syrah and Négrette that could be blended into the predominantly Malbec-based (at least 70%) wines. But since 1979, Abouriou's use in Cahors has been prohibited with only Malbec, Merlot, Tannat and Jurançon permitted to be used in the blend.

=== Outside France ===
In the United States, the variety has a long history of being grown in California, particularly in the Russian River AVA, where it was known as Early Burgundy due to its tendency to ripen early in the harvest season. In the late 20th century, ampelographer Paul Truel was able to identify most plantings of Californian Early Burgundy to be Abouriou. In recent years, other growers and DNA analysis have discovered that not all Early Burgundy plantings were Abouriou with some being the German and Austrian variety Blauer Portugieser instead. A small number of Abouriou vines in the Russian River AVA were initially planted in 1890 by Giuseppe Martinelli and the grapes produced from these vines are still used today to make wine.

== Styles ==
According to Master of Wine Jancis Robinson, Abouriou tends to produce deeply colored and very spicy red wines that can be tannic but often lack acidity. Wine expert Oz Clarke notes that Abouriou is often only used in the lesser quality of Southwest France due to its low acid and high tannic nature.

== Synonyms ==
Over the years Abouriou has been known under a variety of synonyms including: Beaujolais, Early Burgunder, Early Burgundy, Gamay Beaujolais, Gamay du Rhône, Gamay St-Laurent, Malbec Argente, Negret de la Canourgue, Noir Hatif, Plant Abouriou, Plant Précoce, Précoce Naugé, Précoce Noir, Pressac de Bourgogne.
