= Ederena =

Variety of grape

Ederena is a red French wine grape variety that is a crossing of the Bordeaux wine grape Merlot and the Southwest France variety Abouriou. The grape was created in 1952 at the Institut National de la Recherche Agronomique (INRA) center in Bordeaux. In the United States, Ederena is being cultivated by E & J Gallo Winery and the University of California, Davis in the San Joaquin Valley. There is also some plantings of the grape in Switzerland.

The name Ederena comes from the Basque ederrena which means "the most beautiful".

== Viticulture ==
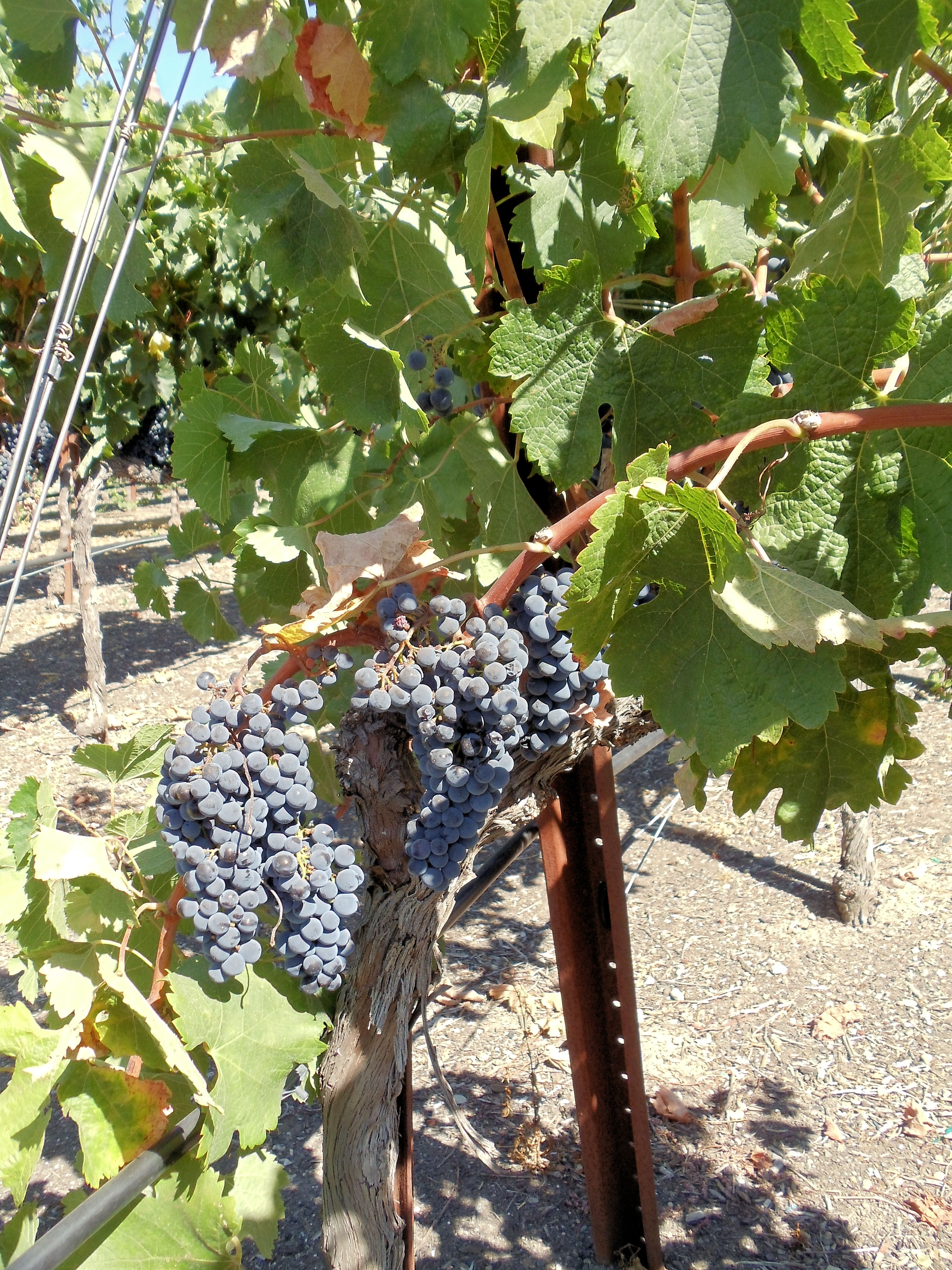
Merlot (pictured) is one of the parent varieties of Ederena.

Ederena is considered a mid-ripening variety that can be very productive and fertile on a variety of vineyard soil types.

== Wine regions ==
Though it originated in France, there are very few plantings of Ederena in the country with less than 1 hectare (2.5 acres) of the grape cultivated in 2008. The variety was brought to the United States by Sunridge Nurseries in Bakersfield, California and is today being propagated in experimental plantings in the San Joaquin Valley by the Gallo winery and the University of California, Davis.

In Switzerland, Ederena is being grown in the town of Chardonne in the Vaud canton where it is blended with Arinarnoa, Caladoc, Carminoir, Egiodola, Malbec and Marselan.

== Styles ==
According to Master of Wine Jancis Robinson, Ederena produce slightly herbaceous light bodied wines that tend to have a perfume bouquet.

== Synonyms ==
Ederena has no known synonyms recognized by Vitis International Variety Catalogue (VIVC) however in some wine texts the grape's name is spelled as Édéréna.
