= Innovia =

Innovia can refer to:

- Innovia Films, a British plastic-film manufacturer
- Alstom Innovia, formerly Adtranz Innovia and Bombardier Innovia, a family of people-mover systems
- Terres Inovia
