= Castets (grape) =

Variety of grape

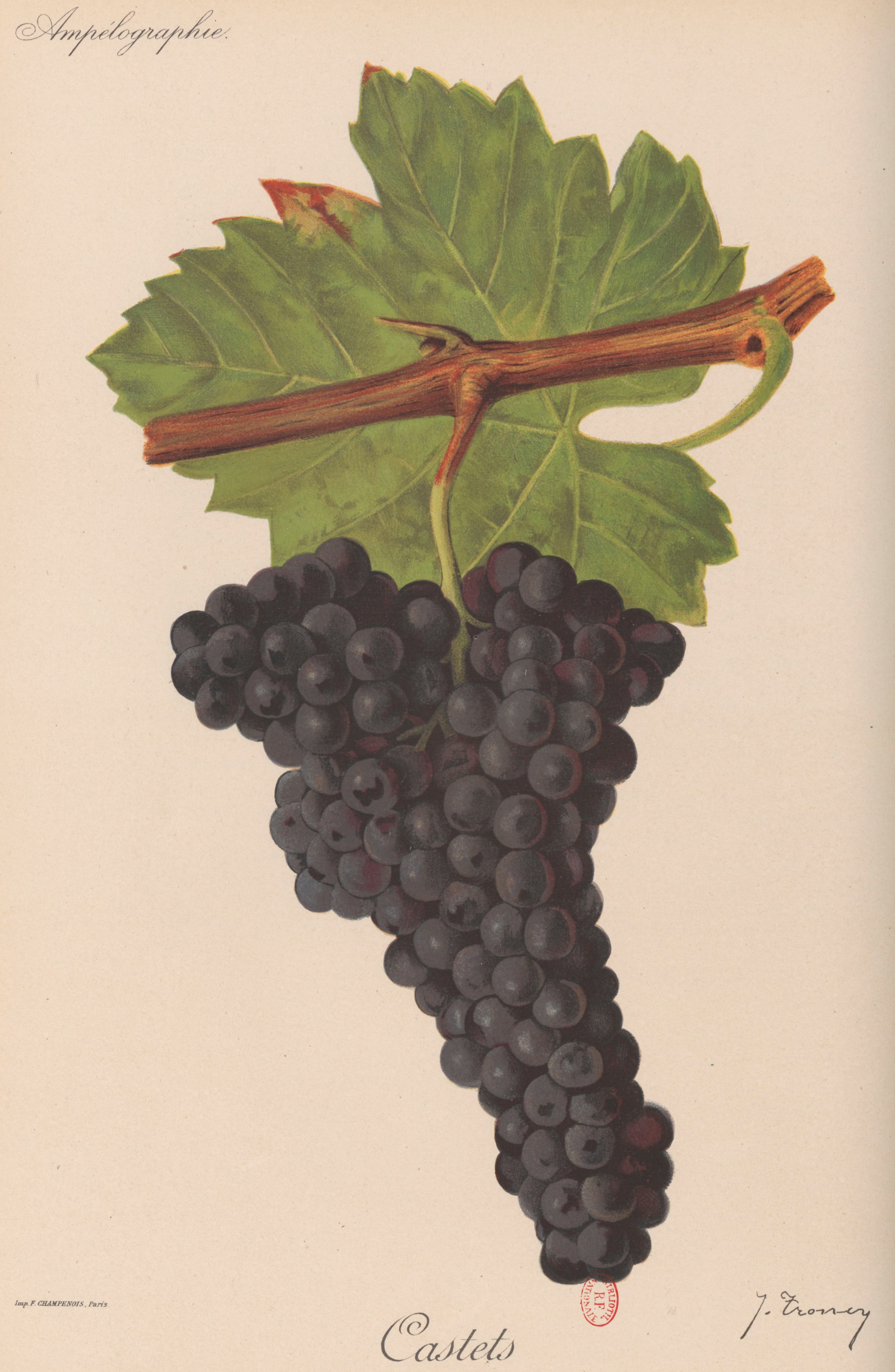
Castets as illustrated by Viala & Vermorel

Castets is a red French wine grape variety that was historically grown in the Aveyron region of France. While some plantings exist in Southwest France, the variety's numbers are dwindling and is now nearly extinct. Since 2021, Castets is one of six new grape varieties that have been approved in Bordeaux in order to be prepared for the effects of climate change on viticulture. Winegrowers in Bordeaux are allowed to plant up to five percent of the cultivated area (5500 hectares) with the new grape varieties

In Slovakia, Castets was crossed with Abouriou to create several varieties including Hron, Nitranka, Rimava and Váh.

== Synonyms ==
Various synonyms have been used to describe Castets and its wines, including Engrunat, Gros Verdau, Gros Machouquet, Machoupet, Matioupet, Maturana tinta (in Rioja) and Nicouleau.
