= Viña Varela Zarranz =

Cultural heritage monument of Uruguay

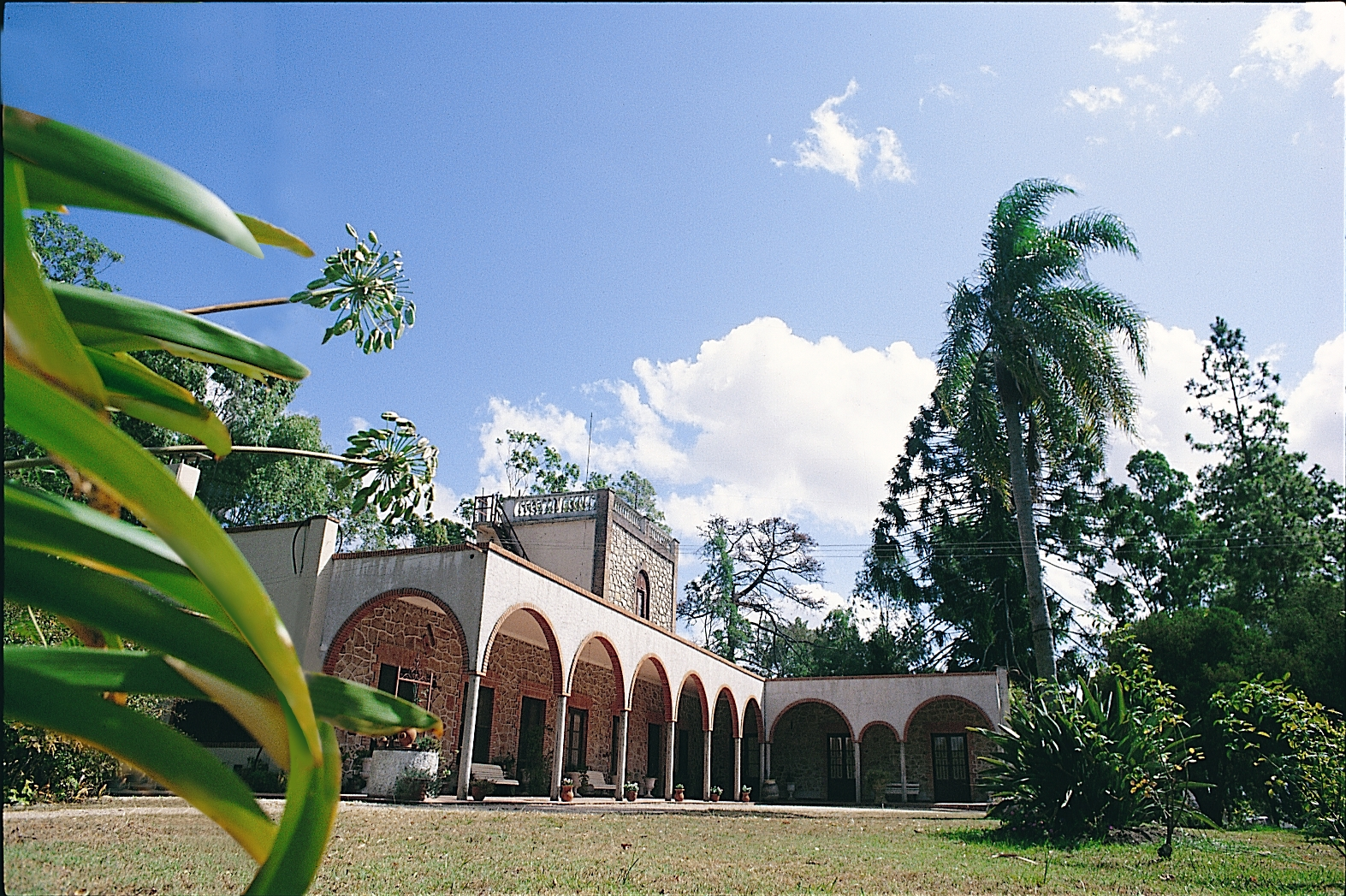
Old House

Viña Varela Zarranz a winery in Uruguay, located in the city of Joaquín Suarez, Canelones. The Varela Zarranz family began their activities at the wine industry in 1933, a decade after the warehouse facility was built in 1888, by Diego Pons, who began growing Harriague, Vidiella, Varzi and Portal grapes.

== History ==
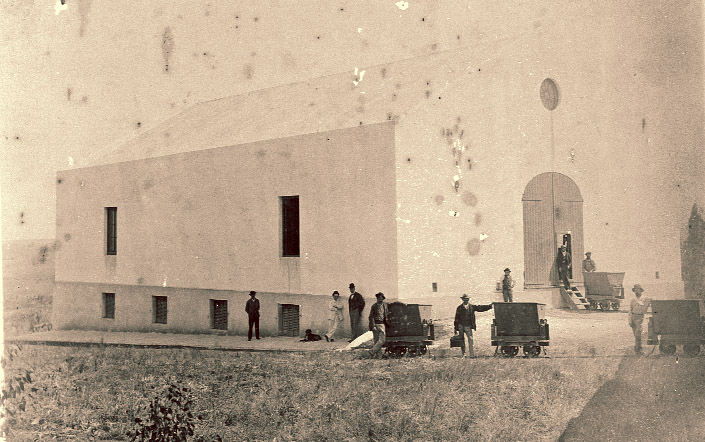
Winery in 1895

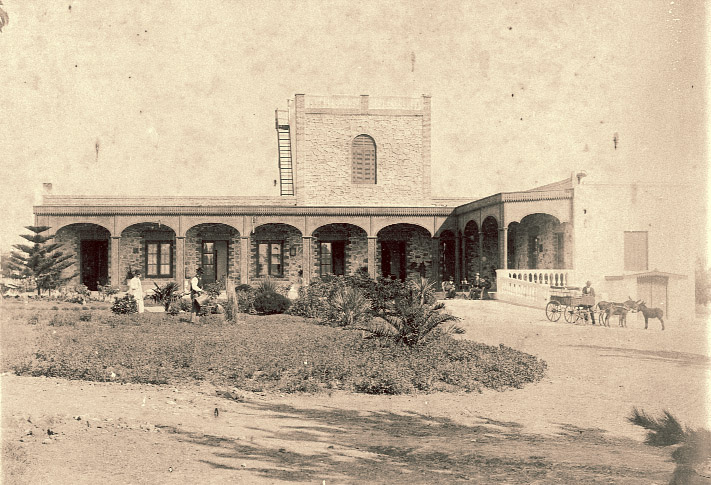
Old House in 1895

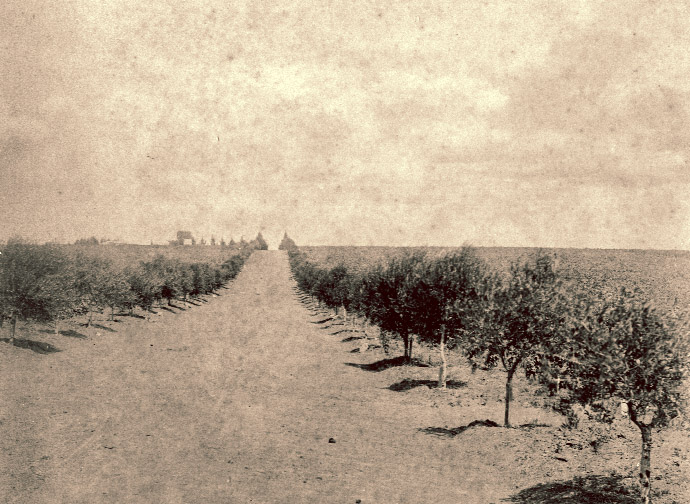
Olives en 1895

The history of the property dates back to the late nineteenth century. Until then, there were small-scale vineyards and the wine was made by European immigrants who occupied the area, using traditional methods and only for family consumption. In 1888 Diego Pons acquired plots of land and in the spring of that year he introduced its first vines, following the advice of his friend Francisco Vidiella, who recommended Pons on using lands for vineyards and associated crops.

In 1892, he ordered the construction of the winery and wine cellar of the establishment. The cellar, with stone walls of two feet wide, maintained the conditions of constant temperature and humidity. Featuring a very modern facility for the time, it had two Hydraulic presses, fermentation vats of concrete and 42 large oak barrels purchased in the workshops of Adolphe Fruhinsholz at Nancy (France). They were brought from France unarmed and each of its parts (called staves). The winery had attached a building for the production of olive oil. He also planted many olive trees, which most of them are still in perfect conditions with more than 100 years of age. They are represented on a flanking olive way access of about 200 meters.

Other treasures were preserved until today like a diary written in ink by its founder, which was written in every day since he bought the land of how to plant the vines, how he began to build the house, the cellar, the first wines were made and stood out in his notes that the Cabernet was the king of his cellar. This journal contains several years of history and comes to the earliest XX.

By the late nineteenth century, the Pons farm had about 400 has — in the town of Suarez, Canelones Department of which 87 were intended to vineyards and the rest to olive groves. The 400,000 feet of vineyard belonged to a wide variety of strains, predominantly Harriague and Vidiella. The average production on Pons farm was about 870,000 kilos of grapes and 600,000 liters of wine annually. The Italian winemaker A. N. Galanti, who visited the company by 1915, referred to the quality of their wines which had earned several awards in national and international exhibitions: Bordeaux (silver medal, 1895), Brussels (honor diploma, 1910). They received several gold medals at exhibitions in Turin (1902), Athens (1903), Milan (1906), Minas (1904), Paris (1905) and Rome (Italy Ministry of Agriculture, 1906) among others.

In 1944, when Pons was 80 years old, he decided to sell his winery to the Varela's family. Since he had no family interested in continuing with the wine industry, Pons wanted to sell his property to someone who valued and continued this activity to which he devoted most of his life to. Varela 's family was at the time engaged in the wine farm and was looking to expand.

== First steps of Viña Varela Zarranz ==
Ramon and Antonio Varela, Spanish descendants, had settled in Las Piedras with a retail general store in the business. Since the 1920s, the firm had entered the wine trade, making a strong relationship with local producers. This activity gave the Varela's brothers a thorough understanding of the problems that lived in the sector. For the characteristics of the production, it was a strong dependence of farmers respects to the wineries in which, when vintage time arrived, they settled prices very low to the product. Moreover, the fragility of the grapes made vintners deprived the actual margins and effective negotiation. In 1933, Ramon and Antonio Varela founded in Las Piedras, signing Viticultores Unidos del Uruguay and settled in the town its first winery. In 1944, as noted, the firm acquired the Pons Farm. Twenty years later, in 1965, the firm Varela Zarranz — successors of Ramón Varela – focusing its activities on Suarez establishment. The addition of a third generation, in 1986, began "a plan for renovation of old vineyards in Suarez, the establishment of new vineyards in Cuatro Piedras and the modernization of the processing plant with the latest technology."

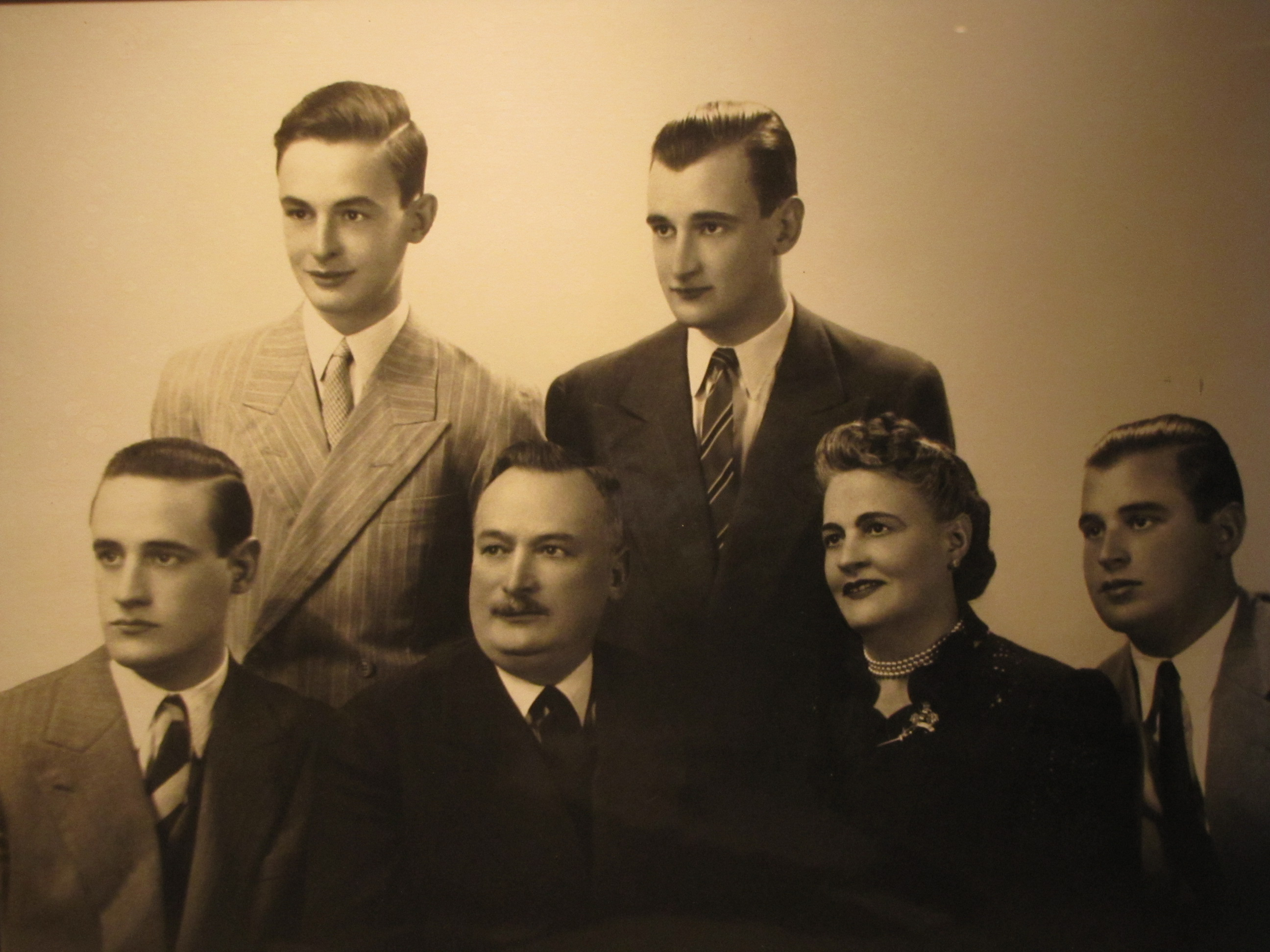
First Generation

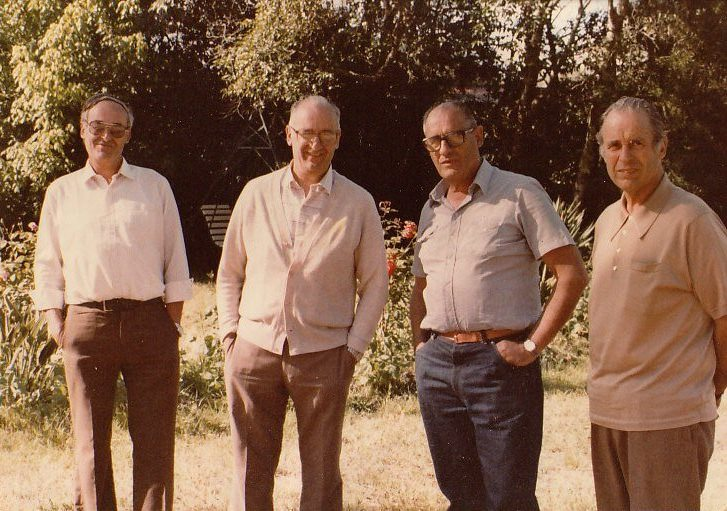
Second Generation

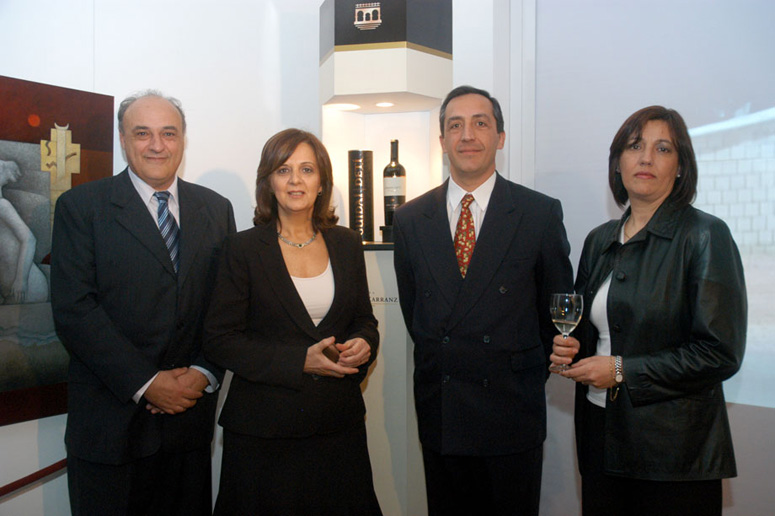
Third Generation (Directors)

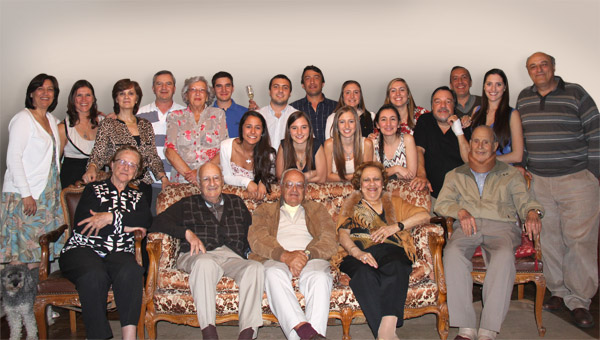
Family nowadays

== Old House, park and tasting room ==
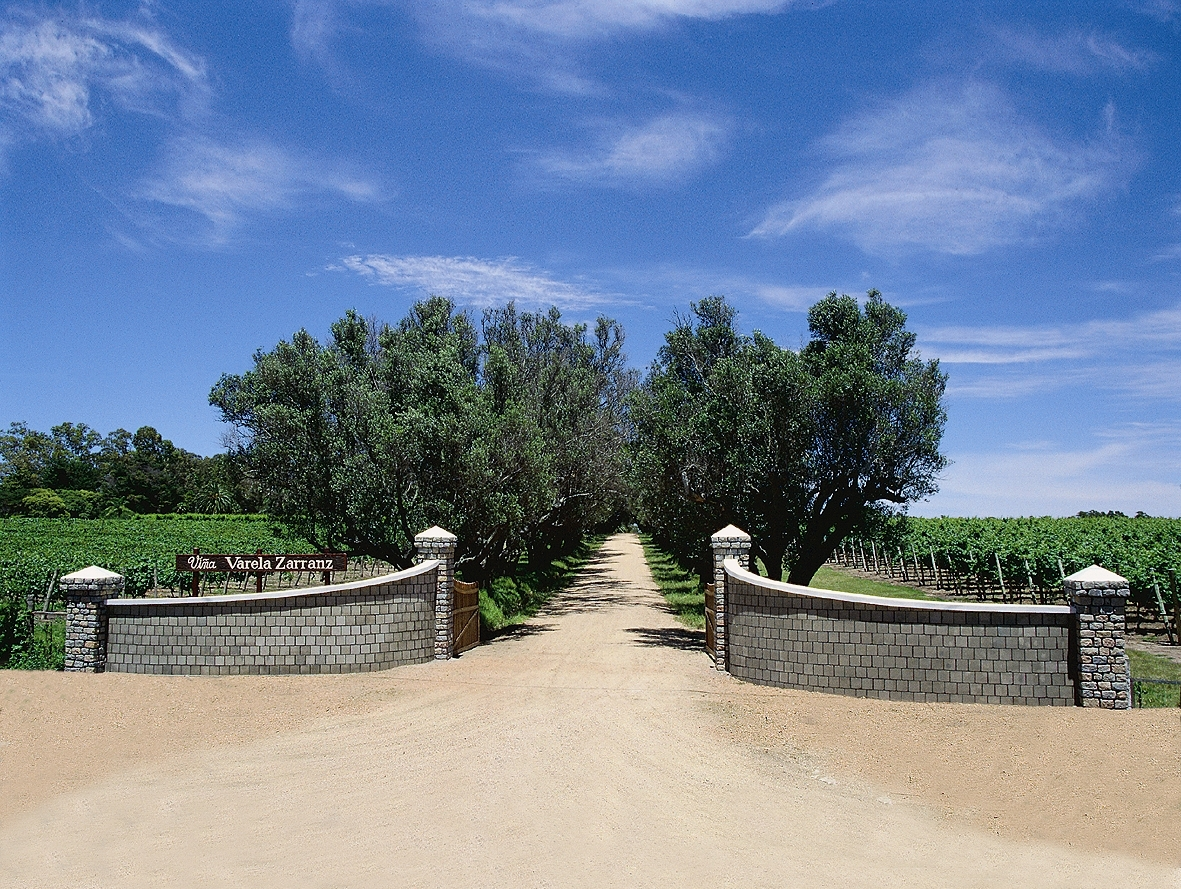
Establishment's Entrance

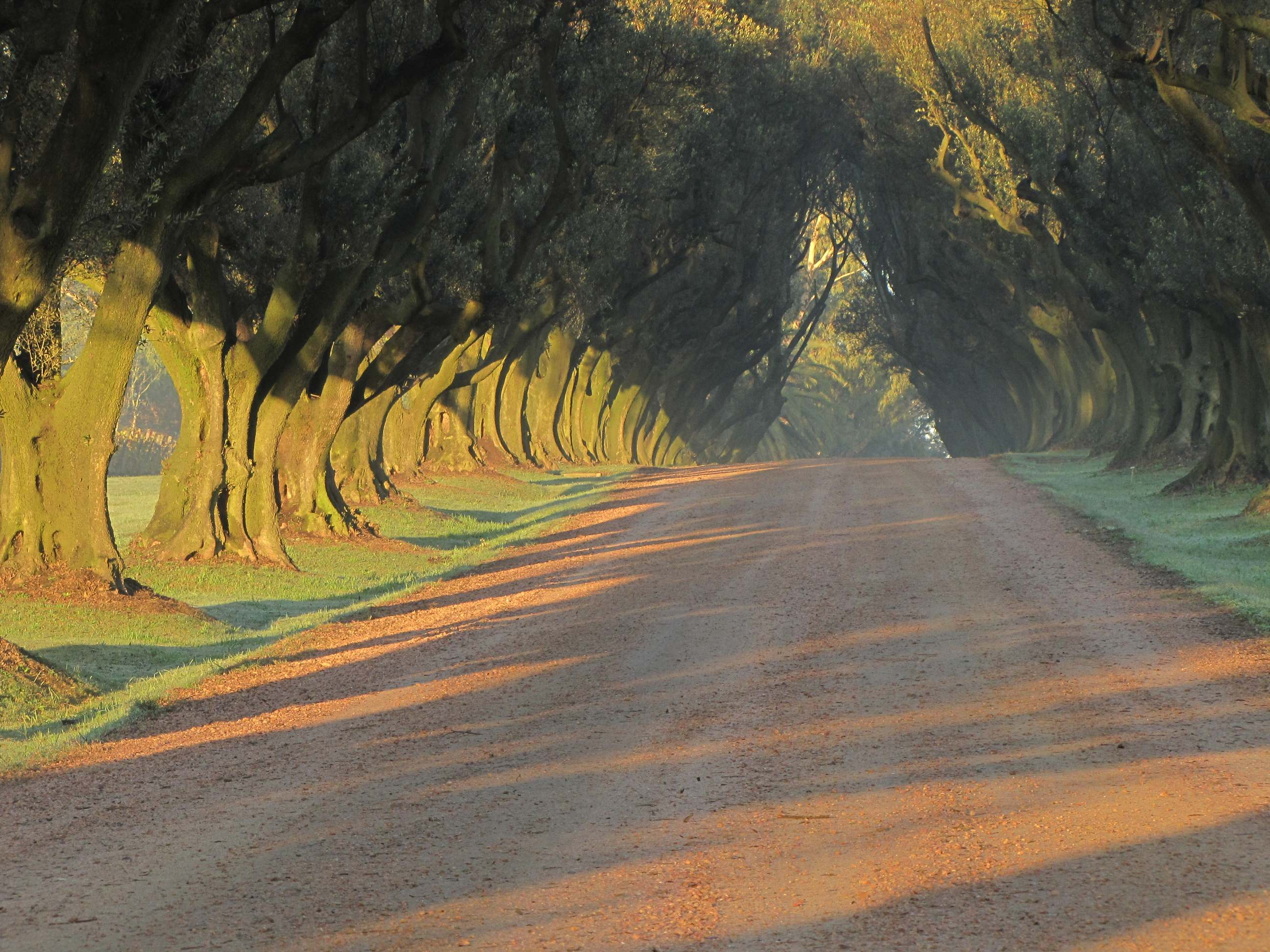
Olives way access at dawn

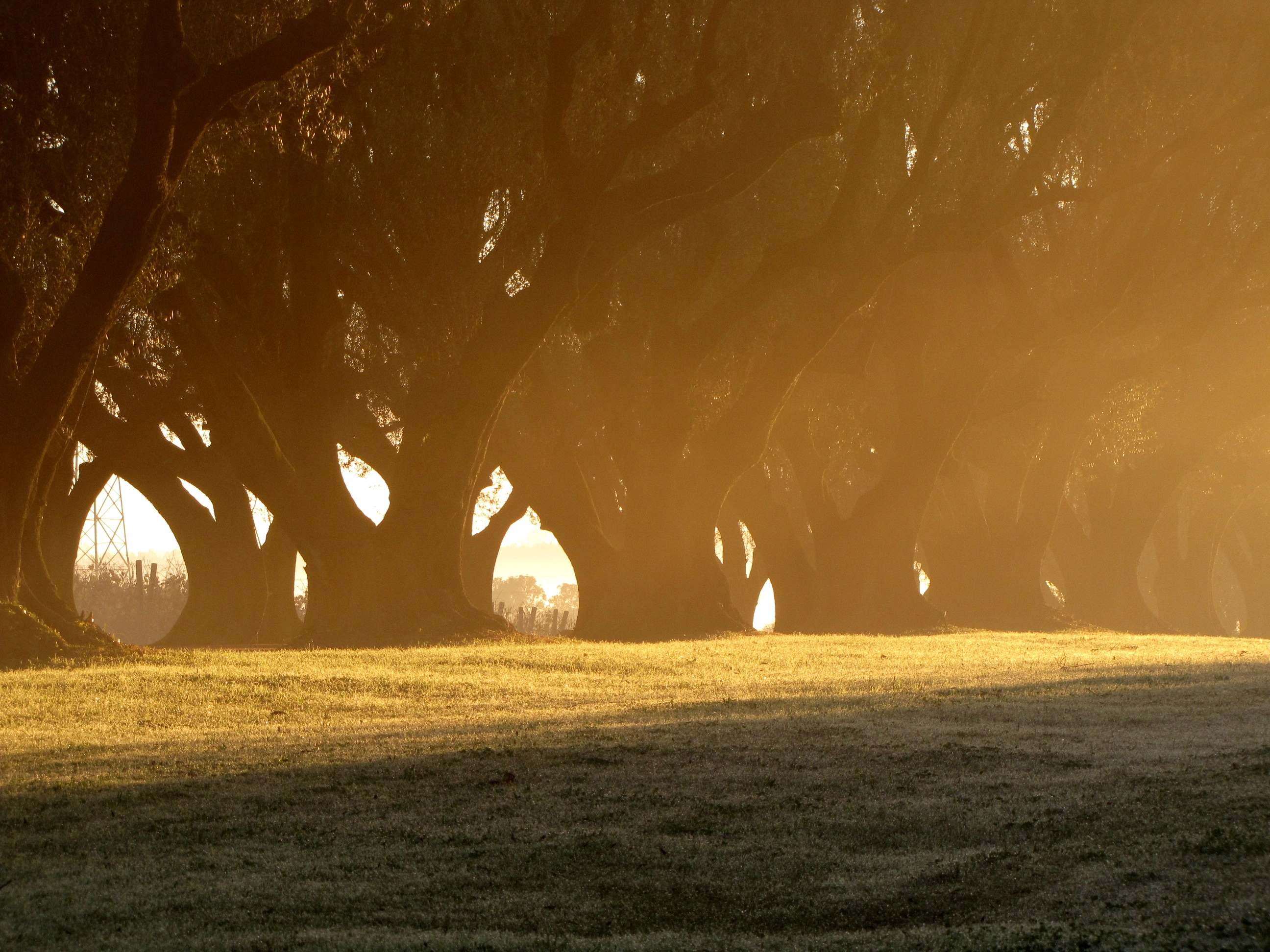
Centenarian Olives

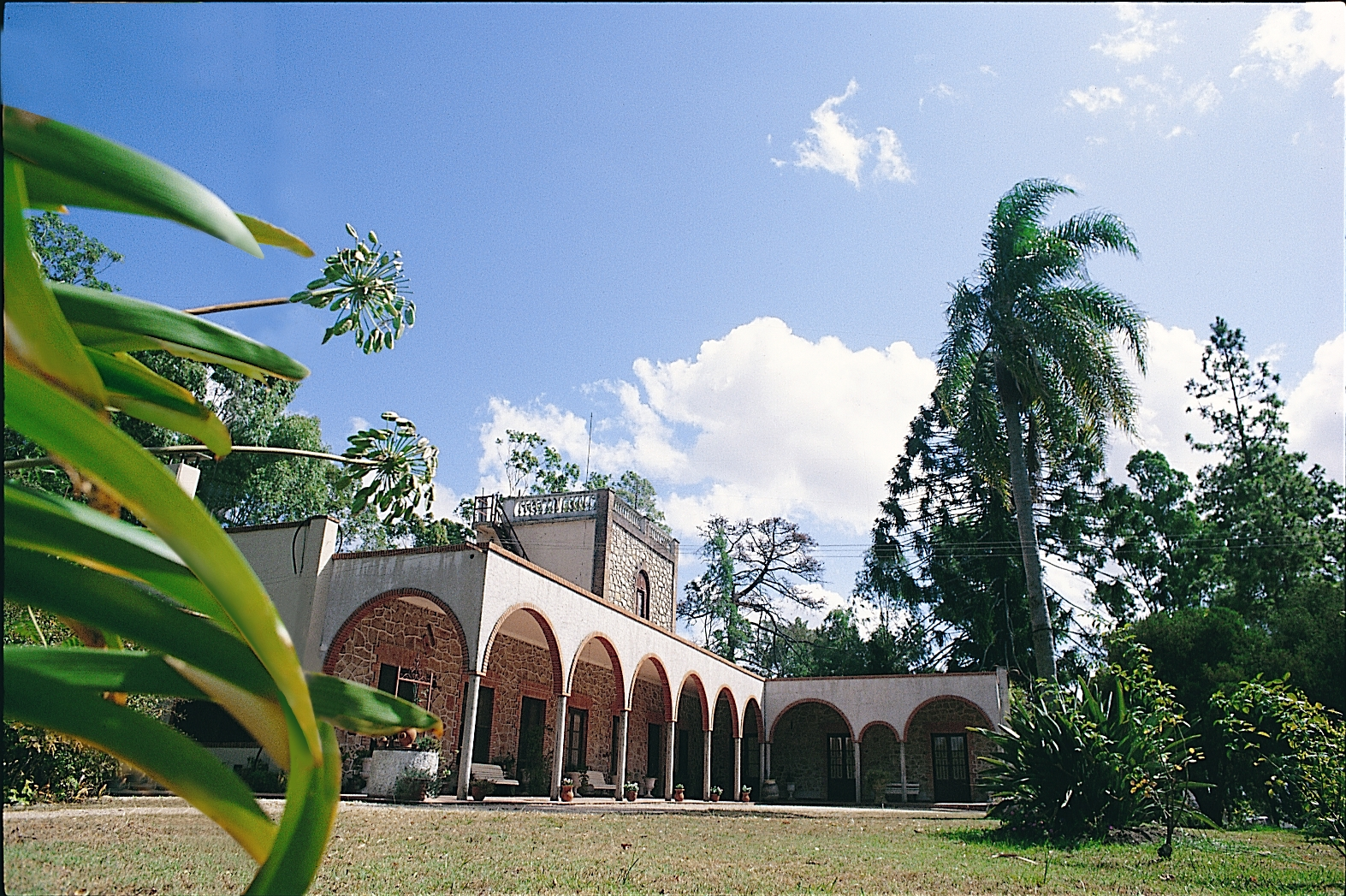
Old House

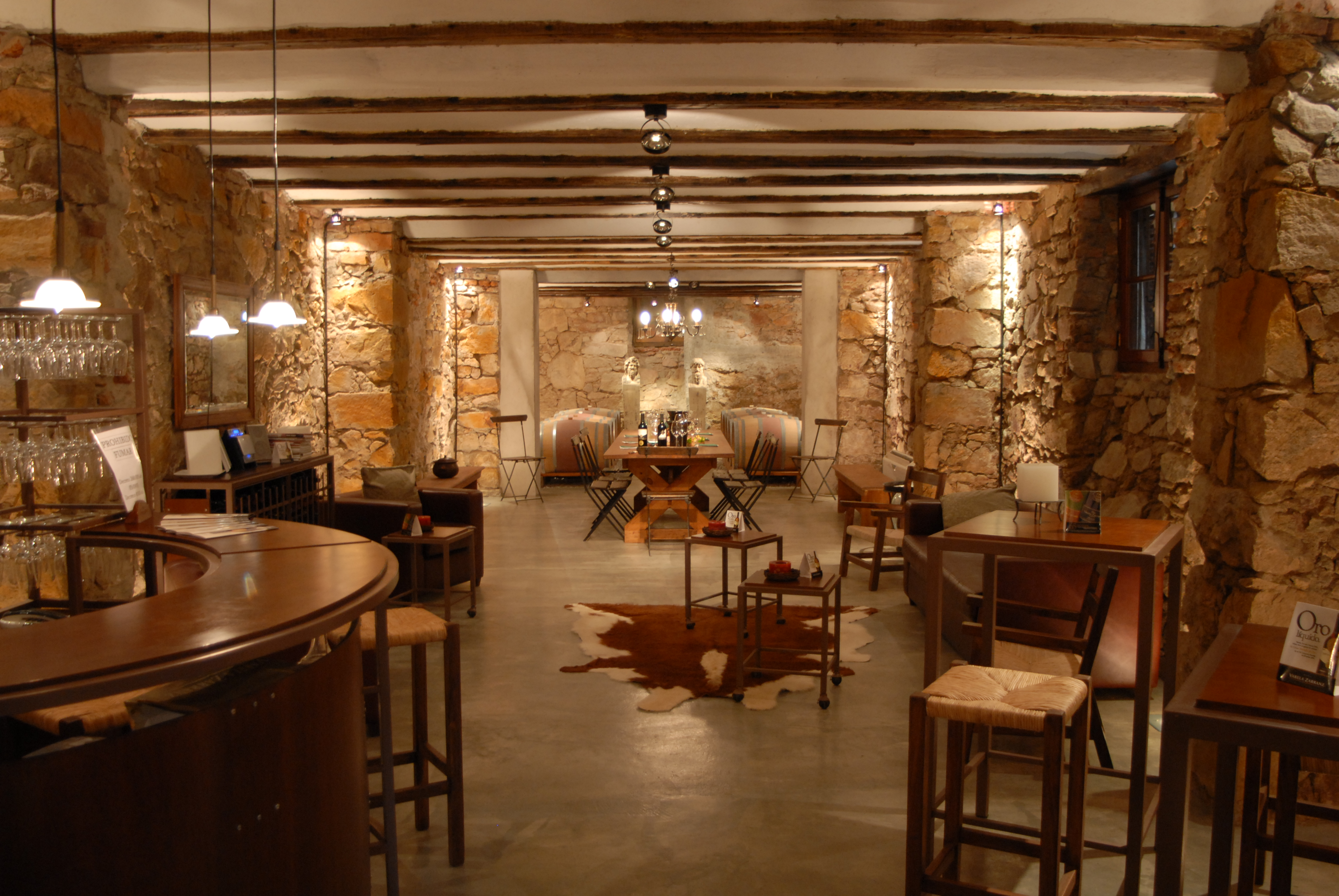
Tasting Room

== Winery ==
In the main room and the underground cellar, which dates back to 1892, the largest collection of French oak barrels in use in Uruguay.

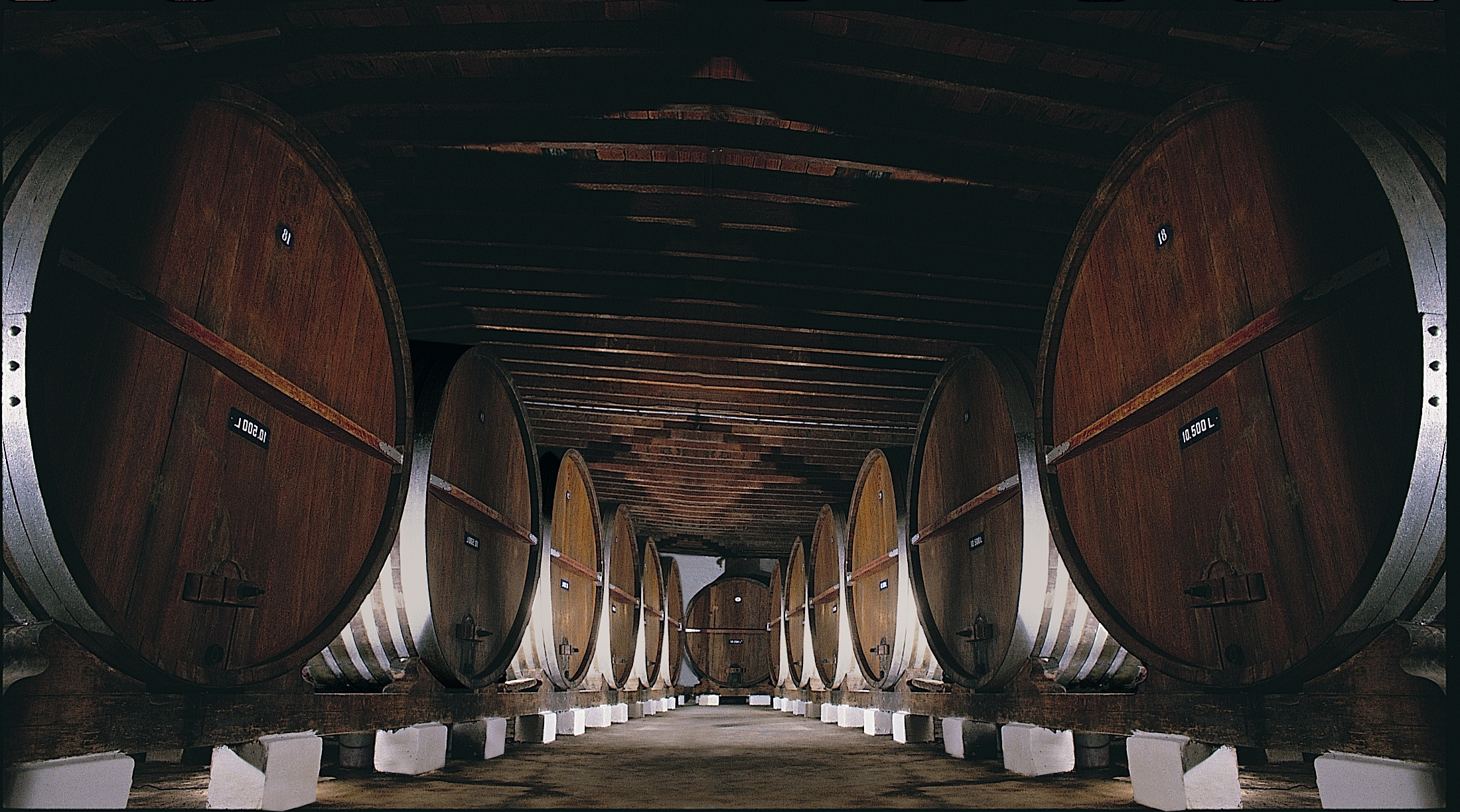
Barrel's Room

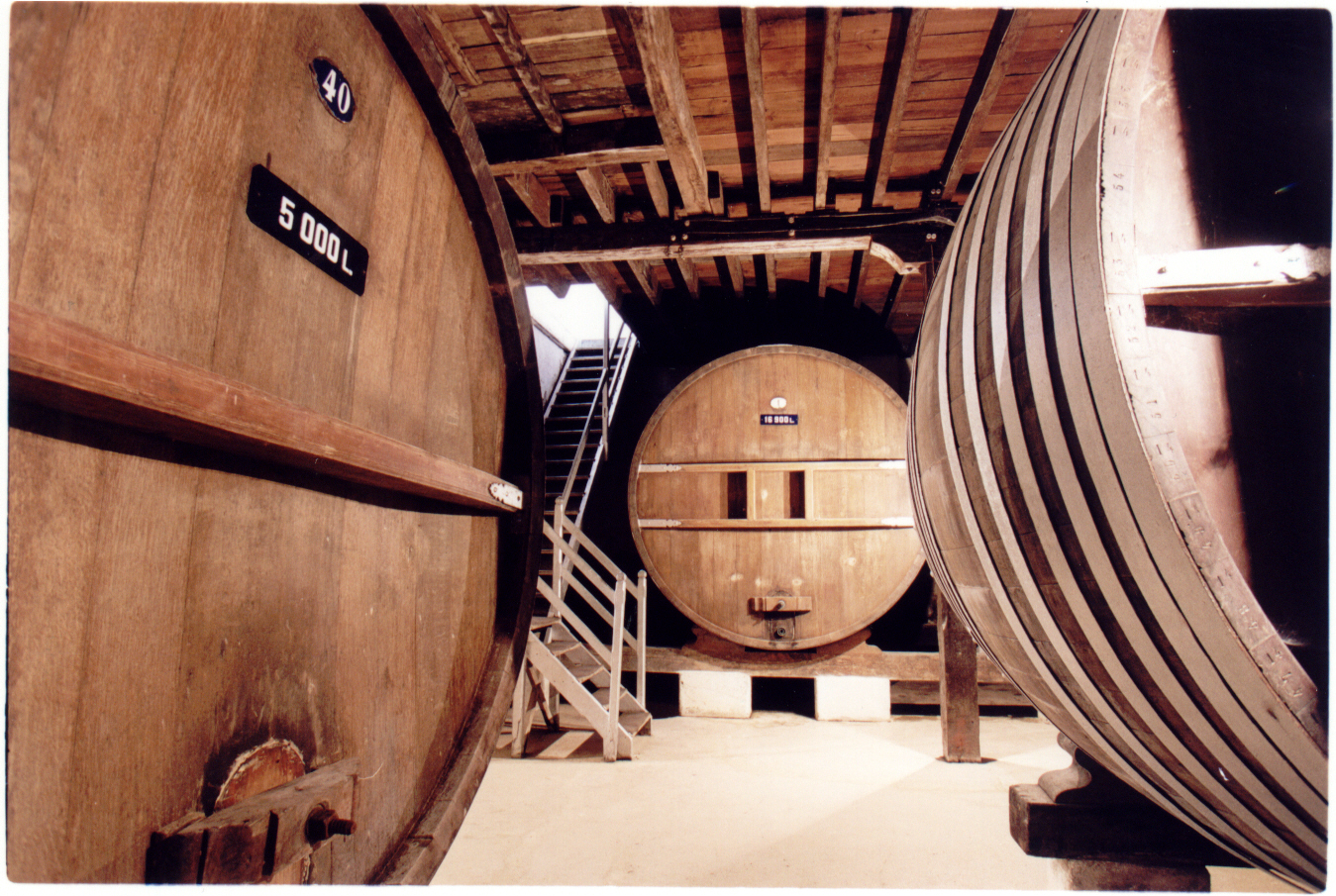
Old Barrel's Room

== Vineyards ==
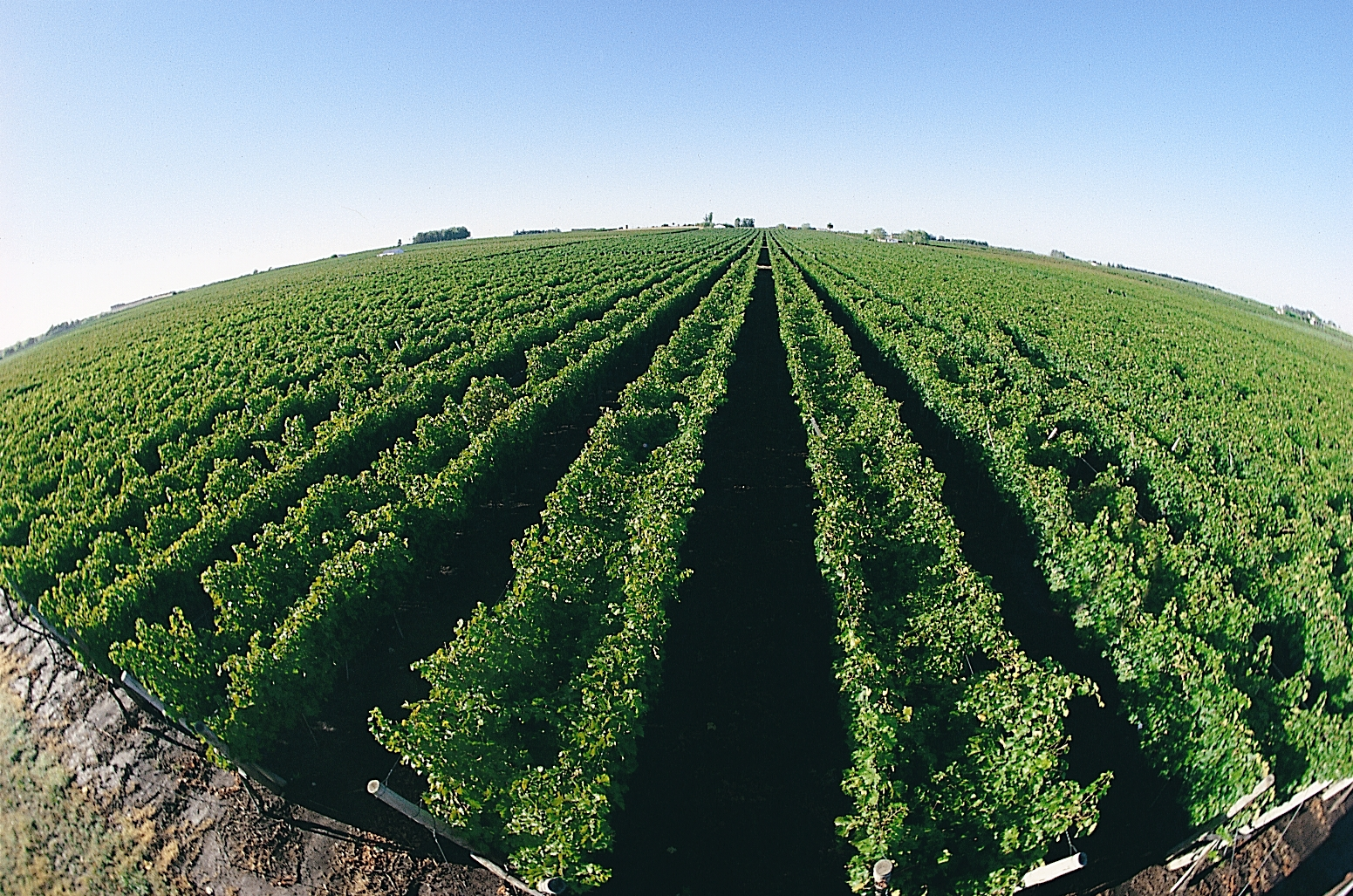
Vineyards with Lyra's driving system

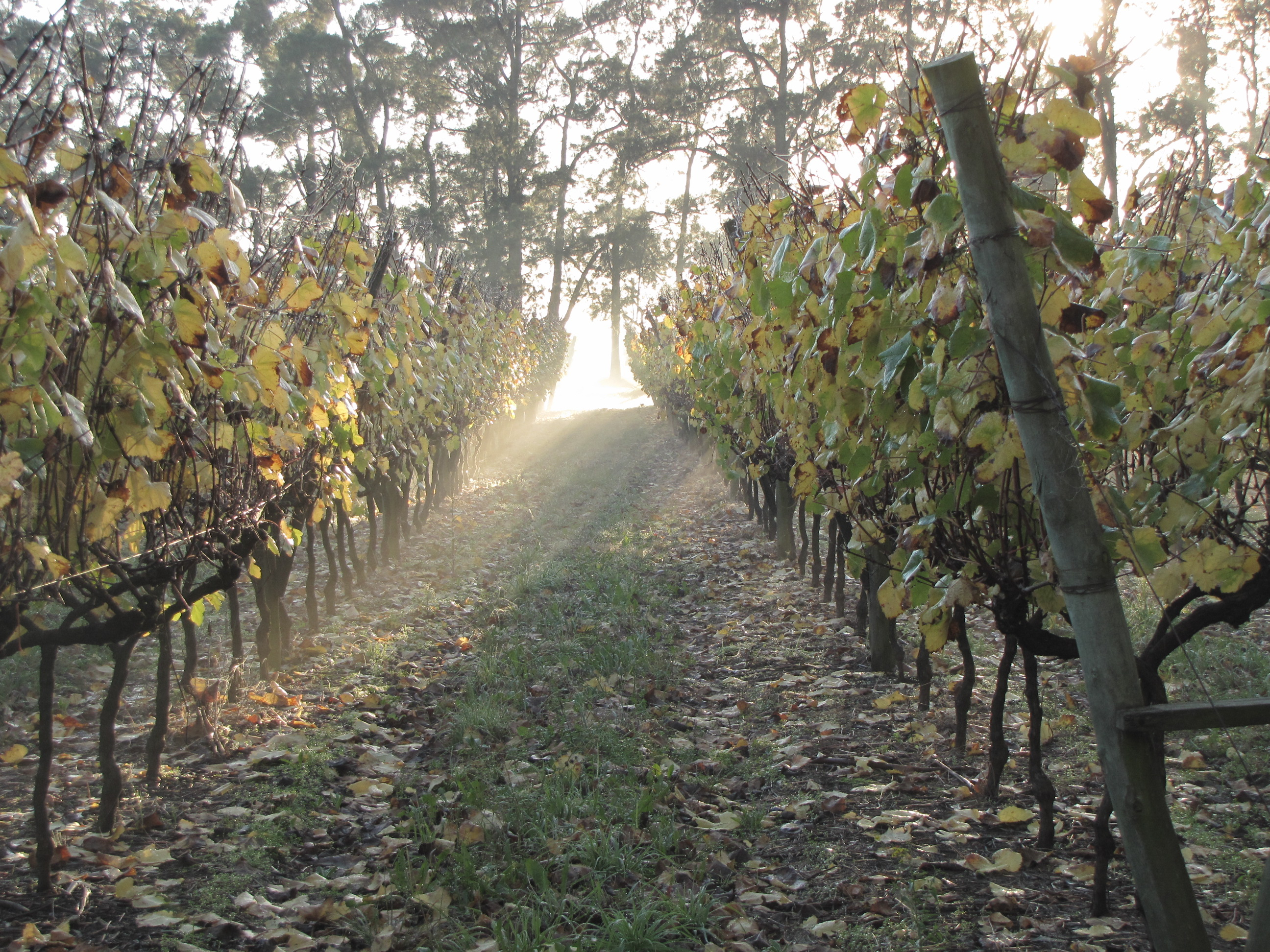
Vineyard in Autumn

The winery and vineyards are located about 10 km away from the River Plate. More than 100 hectares of land are home to vineyards of French origin. The Uruguayan emblematic Tannat grape, heads the list of the red wine grapes followed by Cabernet Sauvignon, whose presence in this establishment can be traced to the nineteenth century, Cabernet Franc, and Merlot.

The vineyard surface encompasses two wine regions differentiated by their soil characteristic: Cuatro Piedras and Suárez.

- Cuatro Piedras

It develops over silt-clay sediments with calcium carbonate concretions. The surface is lightly hilly. Soils are of a black color with slit-clay textures, high fertility, moderately well drained and rich in calcareous.

- Joaquín Suárez

It spreads over the geology of silt-clay sediments in contact with crystalline rocks which emerge in some places. This generates shallow soils with light textures in average, some times with gravel due to variable lithologies of pre-Devonian rocks such as granites, migmatites and metamorphic schist rocks, well defined and of low fertility.

The microclimate of both vineyards is influenced by the proximity of the sea (a few kilometers) and the cool breeze. In Suarez the relative height of terrain reinforces the effect of wind, rapidly cooling the vines.

== Location ==
Route 74, Km. 29, Joaquín Suarez, Canelones, Uruguay. Coordinates: Latitude 30° 43 '34 S, Longitude 56° 02 ' 32 W

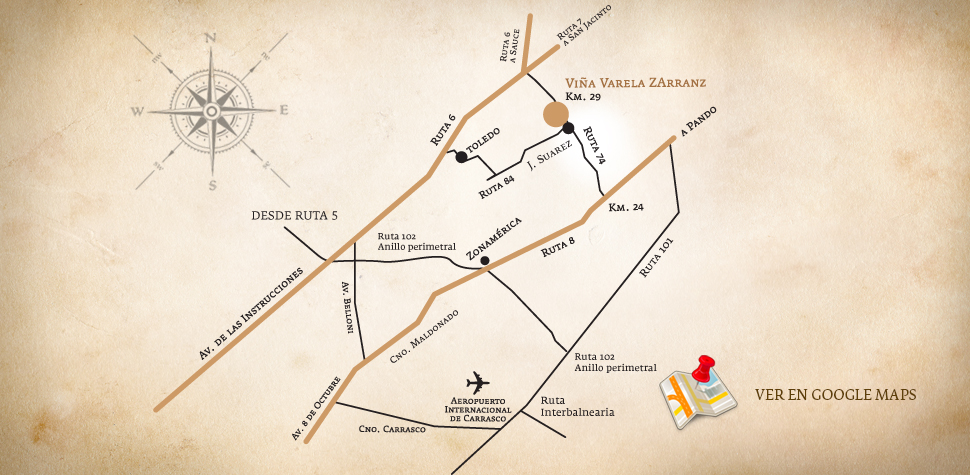
Viña Varela Zarranz Location
