= Topoľčianky =

Topoľčianky Kistapolcsány
- Municipality
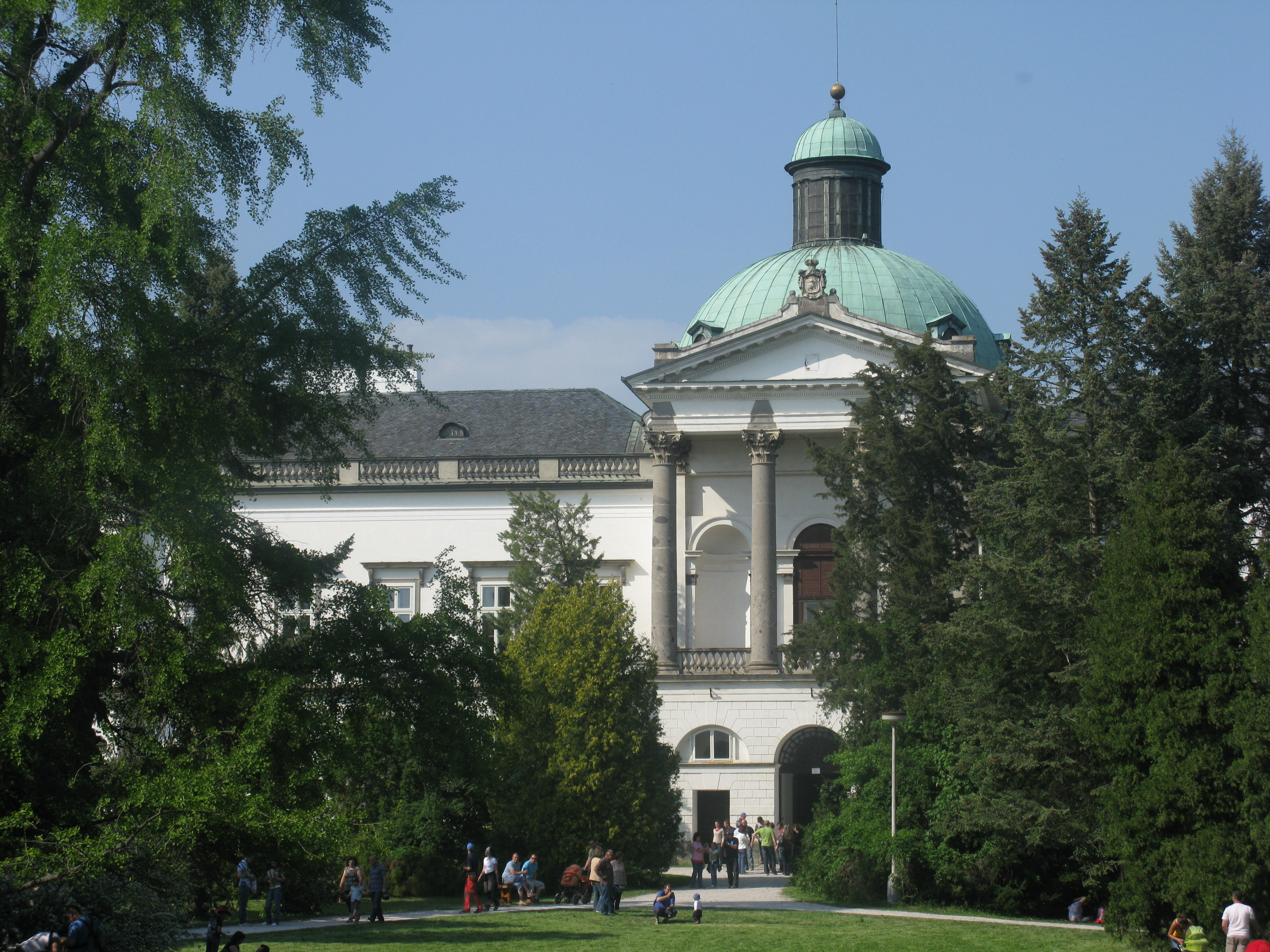
- Topoľčianky Castle

- Flag

- Location of Topoľčianky in the Nitra Region Location of Topoľčianky in Slovakia
- Coordinates: 48.42°N 18.42°E
- Country: Slovakia
- Region: Nitra Region
- District: Zlaté Moravce District
- First mentioned: 1293

Area
  - Total: 26.32 km^{2} (10.16 sq mi)
- Elevation: 226 m (741 ft)

Population (2025)
  - Total: 2,598
- Time zone: UTC+1 (CET)
  - Summer (DST): UTC+2 (CEST)
- Postal code: 951 93
- Area code: +421 37
- Vehicle registration plate (until 2022): ZM
- Website: www.topolcianky.sk

Topoľčianky (Hungarian: Kistapolcsány) is a village and municipality in Zlaté Moravce District of the Nitra Region, in western-central Slovakia.

== History ==
In historical records the village was first mentioned in 1293.

== Tourism ==
Topoľčianky is unique for its European bison Reserve. By the 1930s only a handful of wisents remained, in Poland. A captive breeding population was established and at the time the Topoľčianky reserve was established in 1958, there were 150. The global population is now over 3,000, and in 2004 the reserve started releasing small groups into the Poloniny National Park in eastern Slovakia, where they appear to be thriving.

In nearby Topoľčianky itself, is a Renaissance castle at which the first president of Czechoslovakia, Tomáš Garrigue Masaryk, holidayed every summer between 1923 and 1933. The landscaped gardens which surround the castle are spectacular, and include an early 20th-century hunting lodge surrounded by bronzes of deer and other quarry in their death throes. The castle's southern wing, reconstructed in the early 19th century, is regarded as the purest example of neoclassical architecture in Slovakia, and is open to the public (the rest is now a hotel).

== Geography ==
The municipality lies at an altitude of 226 metres (741 ft) and covers an area of 26.32 km^{2} (10.16 sq mi) (2025). It is located in the northeastern part of county Zlate Moravce. Topoľcianky lies in the upper part of Požitava lowland, surrounded by the mountain chains of Pohronský Inovec and Tribeč. In the means of transport the municipality is situated 120 km from the capital city Bratislava and 5 km from Zlaté Moravce, the county seat.

== Population ==
Population statistic (10 years)
Year	1995	2005	2015	2025
Count	2914	2865	2665	2598
Difference		−1.68%	−6.98%	−2.51%

Population statistic
Year	2024	2025
Count	2608	2598
Difference		−0.38%

It has a population of 2598 people (31 December 2025).

=== Ethnicity ===
Census 2021 (1+ %)
Ethnicity	Number	Fraction
Slovak	2621	96.93%
Not found out	66	2.44%
Total	2704	

In year 2021 was 2704 people by ethnicity 2621 as Slovak, 66 as Not found out, 18 as Czech, 12 as Other, 5 as Rusyn, 5 as Hungarian, 3 as Ukrainian, 3 as Russian, 3 as Romanian, 3 as German, 3 as English, 2 as Serbian, 2 as Austrian, 1 as Romani, 1 as Polish and 1 as Bulgarian.

Note on population: The difference values of population numbers in the table "Population statistic" and in the sections "Ethnicity" & "Religion" is caused by the use of various statistical methods.

=== Religion ===
Census 2021 (1+ %)
Religion	Number	Fraction
Roman Catholic Church	2148	79.44%
None	410	15.16%
Not found out	60	2.22%
Total	2704	

In year 2021 was 2704 people by religion 2148 from Roman Catholic Church, 410 from None, 60 from Not found out, 19 from Evangelical Church, 12 from Paganism and natural spirituality, 9 from Eastern Orthodox Church, 9 from Christian Congregations in Slovakia, 9 from Ad hoc movements, 8 from Other, 7 from Greek Catholic Church, 5 from Buddhism, 4 from Calvinist Church, 1 from Old Catholic Church, 1 from Other and not ascertained christian church, 1 from Islam and 1 from Apostolic Church.

== See also ==
- Chateau Topolcianky
