= Slovak wine =

Wine making in Slovakia

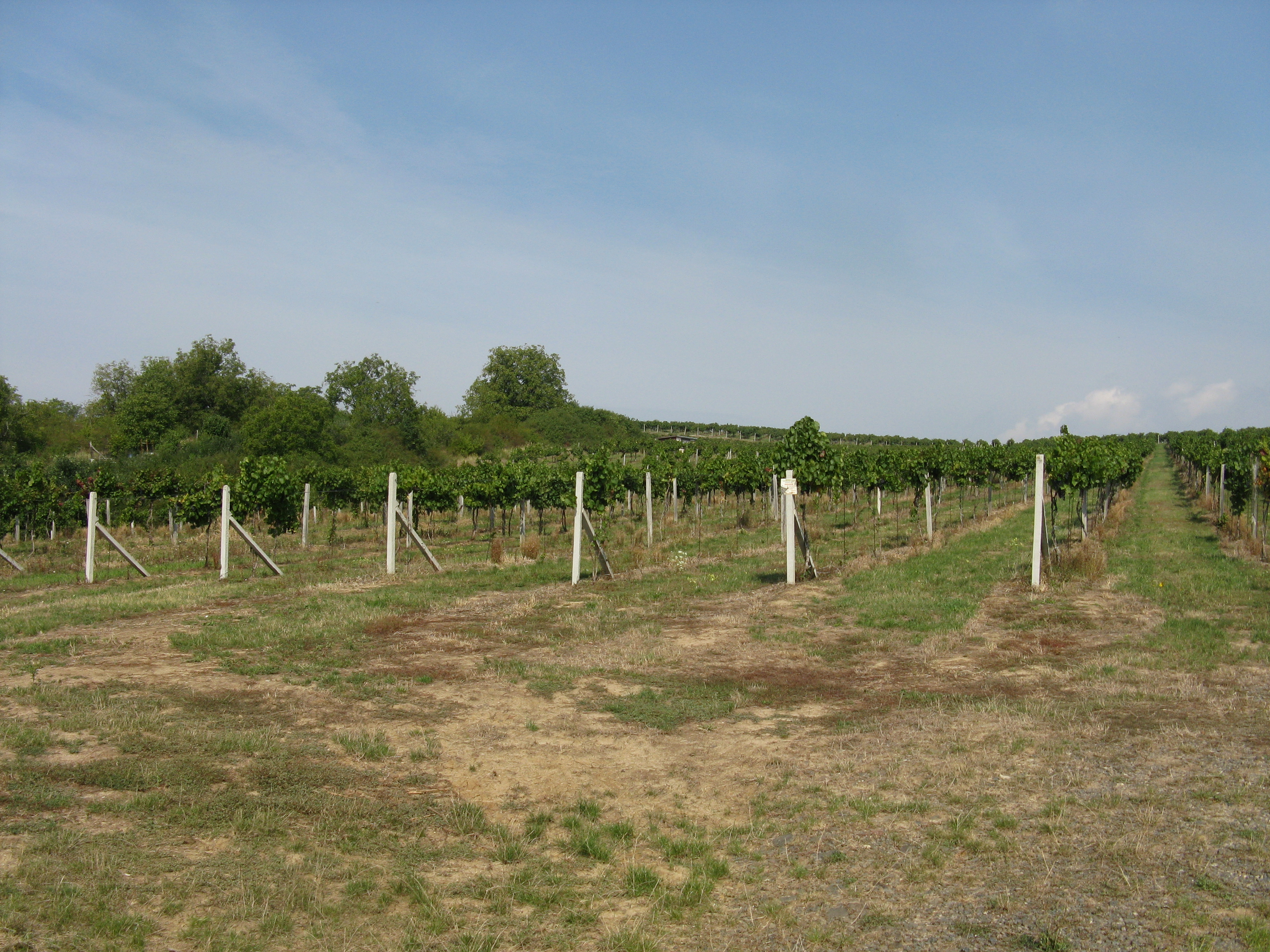
A vineyard in Brhlovce.

Slovak wine is produced in the southern part of Slovakia, which is divided into 6 wine-producing areas. Although Slovak wines except Tokaj are not well-known internationally, they are popular domestically and in neighbouring countries. The best wines are produced by medium-sized wineries with their own vineyards, with white wine production being most dominant, including the full range of historic sweet wines – ice wine, straw wine, and botrytized wine (e.g., Slovak Tokaj).

== History ==
During the period when the Jagiellonian dynasty ruled the area as part of the Kingdom of Hungary and shortly thereafter, Hungary and Slovakia had similar levels of wine quality and were integrated in terms of production. In the early 19th century, the historical region of current day Slovakia, was a major supplier of fine wines to European courts (as much as 57,000 hectares of vineyards), while Phyolloxera decimated the wine industry, wine production was revived in the 20th century, with the total Slovak vineyard today, estimated at 16,000 ha.

== Regions ==
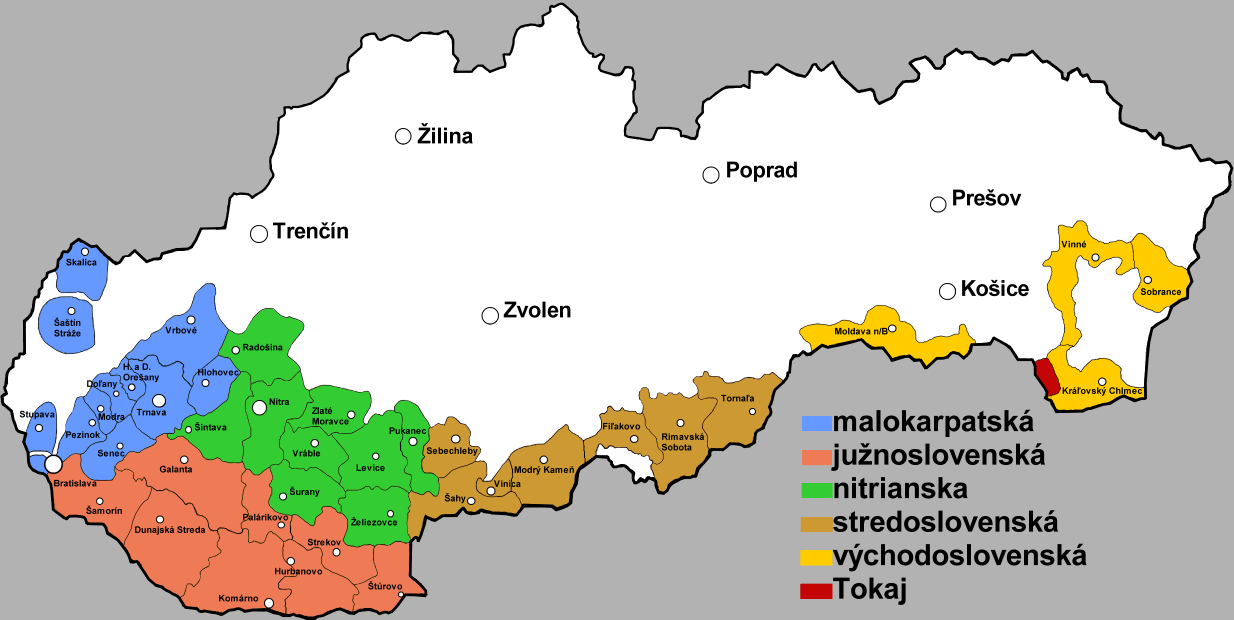
Wine-producing regions in Slovakia.

- Malokarpatská vinohradnícka oblasť – "Little Carpathians Wine Region"
- Južnoslovenská vinohradnícka oblasť – "South Slovak Wine Region"
- Nitrianska vinohradnícka oblasť – "Nitra Wine Region"
- Stredoslovenská vinohradnícka oblasť – "Central Slovak Wine Region"
- Východoslovenská vinohradnícka oblasť – "East Slovak Wine Region"
- Vinohradnícka oblasť Tokaj – "Tokaj Wine Region"

== Grape varieties ==
The most commonly grown grape varieties in Slovakia:

- Veltlínské zelené (Grüner Veltliner) – White – 3,695 ha (9,130 acres)
- Rizling vlašský (Welschriesling) – White – 2,997 ha (7,410 acres)
- Frankovka modrá (Blaufränkisch) – Red – 1,787 ha (4,420 acres)
- Müller-Thurgau – White – 1,743 ha (4,310 acres)
- Svätovavrinecké (St. Laurent) – Red – 1,337 ha (3,300 acres)
- Rulandské biele (Pinot Blanc) – White – 934 ha (2,310 acres)
- Rizling rýnsky (Riesling) – White – 925 ha (2,290 acres)
- Cabernet Sauvignon – Red – 626 ha (1,550 acres)
- Rulandské modré (Pinot Noir) – Red
- Rulandské šedé (Pinot Gris) – White
- Tramín červený (Gewürztraminer) – White

=== Modern hybrids ===
The following varieties were developed at VSSVVM Research and Breeding Station for Enology and Viticulture in Modra.

- Hron
- Nitria
- Rimava
- Váh
- Dunaj

== Origin specification ==
Typically, the label will specify the wine's origin with the following terms

- vinohradnícka oblasť – region, e.g. Malokarpatská, Južnoslovenská, Nitrianska, Stredoslovenská, Východoslovenská and Tokajská
- vinohradnícky rajón – district – there are 40 districts in Slovak regions
- vinohradnícka obec – municipality/village – 690 in Slovakia
- vinohradnícky hon – vineyard

== Composition ==
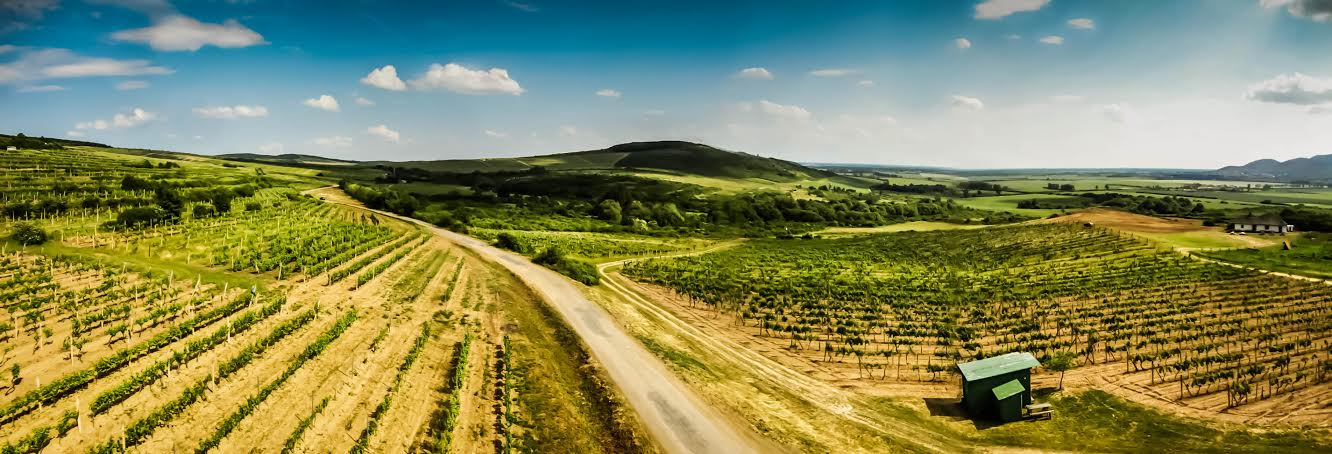
Tokaj wine region located in southeastern Slovakia

The types of wine is usually labelled with one of the following terms:

Víno bez zemepisného označenia – "Wine without geographic indication" is replacing former category of Stolové víno – Table wine. Minimum level of sugar content is 13 °NM.

Víno s chráneným zemepisným označením – "Wine with protected geographic indication" – produced from grapes registered in the List of registered varieties, grown, produced and bottled in one of the Slovak wine regions, maximum yield per hectare wasn't exceeded, minimum level of sugar content was 13 °NM and it fulfills the requirements of established product specification. It can be indicated with traditional term regionálne víno if the grapes reached 15 °NM, the maximum yield didn't exceed 18,000 kg/ha, wine has minimum 8.5% of alcohol and it complies with quality requirements.

Víno s chráneným označením pôvodu - "Wine with protected indication of origin" is produced from grapes registered in List of registered varieties, grown, produced and bottled in the same or proximate neighbouring Slovak wine regions, maximum yield per hectare wasn't exceeded, minimum level of sugar content was 16 °NM, there is existing protection on the designation of origin or geographical indication. Term Districtus Slovakia Controllatus, symbol and abbreviation "D. S. C." can be used if wine was certified.

- Akostné víno - "Quality wine" classified by control institute as odrodové - "single varietal" (variety is written up in the List of registered grape varieties) or značkové "branded" (blend of two or more grape varieties or a single grape variety not written in the List or registered grape varieties). Wine is made from the grapes of which natural sugar content is at least 16 °NM and the maximum yield was not exceeded (18,000 kg/ha) with minimum of 9.5% alcohol. It can be chaptalised to 22 °NM for whites and 24 °NM for reds. Wine complies with quality requirements determined by special regulation.

=== Specific conditions ===
- Mladé víno "Young wine" - has to be bottled before the end of the year of harvest. It is allowed to put the wine into the circulation as from the first Monday of November.

- Archívne víno "Archive wine" - has matured at least three years after harvesting the grapes used for the production of the wine.

- Panenská úroda "First fruits" - grapes used for the production came from the first harvest of a vineyard. The first harvest has to be from the third or fourth year after planting.

- Akostné víno s prívlastkom - "Quality wine with attribute" classified by the control institute as the "quality wine with attribute" complies with quality requirements determined by special regulation, the maximum yield per hectare is not exceeded (13,000 kg/ha), vine variety, origin of grapes, its natural sugar contents, weight and health condition are certified before processing by an employee of the control institute, the ban on increase in natural alcoholic strength by volume and adjustment of residual sugar is observed.

- Kabinetné "Kabinett" - yielded from full mature grapes having natural sugar content of at least 19 °NM, and minimum of 9.5% alcohol. Wines are primarily suché - "dry", rarely polosuché - "medium dry".

- Neskorý zber "Late harvest" yielded from full mature grapes having natural sugar contents of at least 21 °NM and minimum of 9.5% alcohol. Wines are primarily suché - "dry", occasionally polosuché - "medium dry" and rarely polosladké - "medium sweet".

- Výber z hrozna "Grapes selection" - yielded from full mature grapes having natural sugar contents of at least 23 °NM, obtained from carefully selected bunches and with minimum of 9.5% alcohol. Residual sugar varies from suché to polosuché and polosladké - "dry, medium dry and medium sweet".

- Bobuľový výber "Berry selection" - yielded from manually selected overripe grape bunches from which immature and impaired berries have been removed manually, having natural sugar contents of at least 26 °NM and at least 8% of alcohol. Wines are having mainly higher residual sugar - "polosuché and polosladké", although suché "dry" versions are common as well.

- Hrozienkový výber "Raisin selection" - yielded exclusively from manually selected overripe natural grape berries, having sugar contents of at least 28 °NM and at least 8% alcohol. Wines are primarily sladké - "sweet".

- Cibébový výber "Nobly rotten raisin selection" - yielded exclusively from manually selected overripe grape berries refined by effect of Botrytis cinerea Persoon, having natural sugar contents of at least 28 °NM and minimum content 8 % of alcohol. Wines are sladké - "sweet".

- Ľadové víno "Ice wine" - yielded from grapes harvested at the temperature of minus 7 °C (19 °F) and lower, the grapes remained frozen during the harvesting and processing, and the obtained must had natural sugar contents of at least 27 °NM, wine has at least 6% of alcohol. Wines are sladké - "sweet".

- Slamové víno "Straw wine" - yielded from well ripened grapes, stored before processing on straw or in reed matting, alternatively it has been left hanging on strings for at least three months and the natural sugar content of obtained must was at least 27 °NM, wine has at least 6% of alcohol. Wines are primarily sladké - "sweet".

Likérové víno "Liqueur wine"

=== Sugar content ===
- Suché - "Dry" If its sugar content does not exceed 4 grams per litre, or 9 grams per litre, provided that the total acidity expressed as grams of tartaric acid per litre is not more than 2 grams below the residual sugar content.
- Polosuché "Medium dry" - If its sugar content exceeds the maximum set at above but not exceeds 12 grams per litre, or 18 grams per litre, provided that the total acidity expressed as grams of tartaric acid per litre is not more than 10 grams below the residual sugar content.
- Polosladké "Medium/Medium sweet" - If its sugar content is higher than the maximum set at above but not more than 45 grams per litre.
- Sladké "Sweet" - If its sugar content is of at least 45 grams per litre.

== Sparkling wines ==
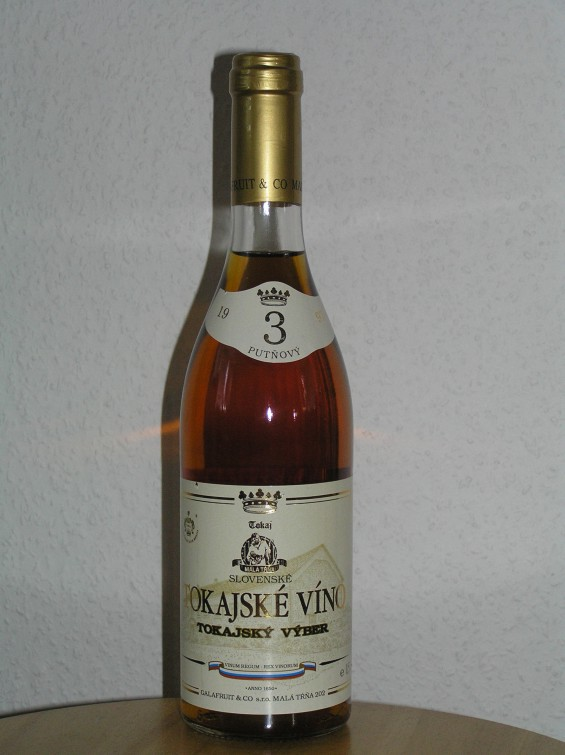
A bottle of Slovak Tokaj wine

- Šumivé víno "Sparkling wine" shall be the product, which is obtained by first or second alcoholic fermentation from fresh grapes, grape must and from wine. Has an excess pressure, due to carbon dioxide in solution, of not less than 300 kPa (3 bar) when kept at a temperature of 20 °C in closed containers, when these are opened, it releases carbon dioxide derived exclusively from fermentation. The total alcoholic strength of the cuvées intended for their preparation shall not be less than 8.5% vol.
- Akostné šumivé víno "Quality sparkling wine" As sparkling wine. Excess pressure of not less than 350 kPa (3.5 bar), the total alcoholic strength of the cuvées intended for their preparation shall not be less than 9% vol.
- Akostné aromatické šumivé víno "Quality aromatic sparkling wine" is obtained only by making use, when constituting the cuvée, of grape must or grape must in fermentation which are derived from specific wine grape varieties on a list, excess pressure of not less than 300 kPa (3 bar), of which the actual alcoholic strength may not be less than 6% vol. and of which the total alcoholic strength may not be less than 10% vol.

=== Traditional terms ===
- Pestovateľský Sekt Basic conditions of the production are met with condition for producing quality sparkling wines and the last phase of the process of sparkling wine yielding is carried out by the winegrower of the vineyard from which grapes used for the production are. Single components of the cuvée of the pestovateľský sekt shall be from one wine-growing area.

- Sekt vinohradníckej oblasti Sparkling wine obtained by primary or secondary fermentation of quality wine from grapes grown on wine-growing fields in wine-growing areas and exclusively in the wine-growing area where grapes for its yielding are grown or in immediately neighbouring area and basic conditions of the production are met with condition for quality sparkling wines.

- Perlivé víno "Semi sparkling wine"
- Sýtené víno "Aerated sparkling wine"

Indication of the sugar content (sparkling wine, aerated sparkling wine, quality sparkling wine or quality aromatic sparkling wine)

- Brut Nature - If its sugar content is less than 3 grams per litre; these terms may be used only for products to which no sugar has been added after the secondary fermentation.
- Extra Brut - If its sugar content is between 0 and 6 grams per litre.
- Brut - If its sugar content is less than 12 grams per litre.
- Extra Dry - If its sugar content is between 12 and 17 grams per litre.
- Dry - If its sugar content is between 17 and 32 grams per litre.
- Demi - Sec - If its sugar content is between 32 and 50 grams per litre.
- Sladké - "Doux/Sweet" - If its sugar content is greater than 50 grams per litre.

== See also ==
- Chateau Topolcianky
- Winemaking
