= Veterinary Research =

- Language: English

Publication details
- Former name(s): Annales de Recherches Vétérinaires, Recherches Vétérinaires
- History: 1968-present
- Publisher: BioMed Central INRAE
- Frequency: Bimonthly
- Open access: Yes

Standard abbreviations
- ISO 4: Vet. Res.

Indexing
- CODEN: VEREEM
- ISSN: 0928-4249 (print); 1297-9716 (web)
- LCCN: 2011254554

Veterinary Research is an international open access journal focusing on animal infectious diseases. Veterinary Research publishes original papers and reviews on host-pathogen interactions. Thematics are bacteriology, epidemiology, immunology, parasitology, prion diseases and virology.

It was originally established as Annales de Recherches Vétérinaires (1970–1992), which itself superseded Recherches Vétérinaires (1968–1969). The journal acquired its current name in 1993.

The journal was initially published by the Institut National de la Recherche pour l'agriculture, l'alimentation et l'environnement (INRAE), and later by Elsevier and EDP Sciences. It is now published by BMC and Springer. The journal is currently edited by Vincent Béringue.

== Abstracting and indexing ==
The journal is abstracted and indexed in the following bibliographic databases:

- BIOSIS
- CABI
- CAS
- Current contents
- DOAJ
- Embase
- Global Health
- HAL
- MEDLINE
- PubMed
- PubMed Central
- Science Citation Index Expanded
- Scopus
