= Normalizovaný moštomer =

Normalizovaný moštoměr (°NM) is a scale used in the Czech Republic and Slovakia for measuring the sweetness of wine must. 1 °NM indicates 1 kg of sugar in 100 litres of must. Czech wine and Slovak wine are classified by the level of sweetness of the must and other conditions such as the region where the grapes are grown. The scale is used for the determination of Quality Wine with Special Attributes. At the time of harvest, the sweetness of the grape must is measured and certified by the government controlling and testing institute. In the Czech Republic, this institute is the Czech State Agricultural & Food Inspectorate (SZPI).

Conversions to Other Scales:

- °Oe = 3.845 x °NM + 10,8
- °KMW = 0,732 x °NM +3,2
