= Caladoc =

French wine grape variety

- Grape (Vitis)
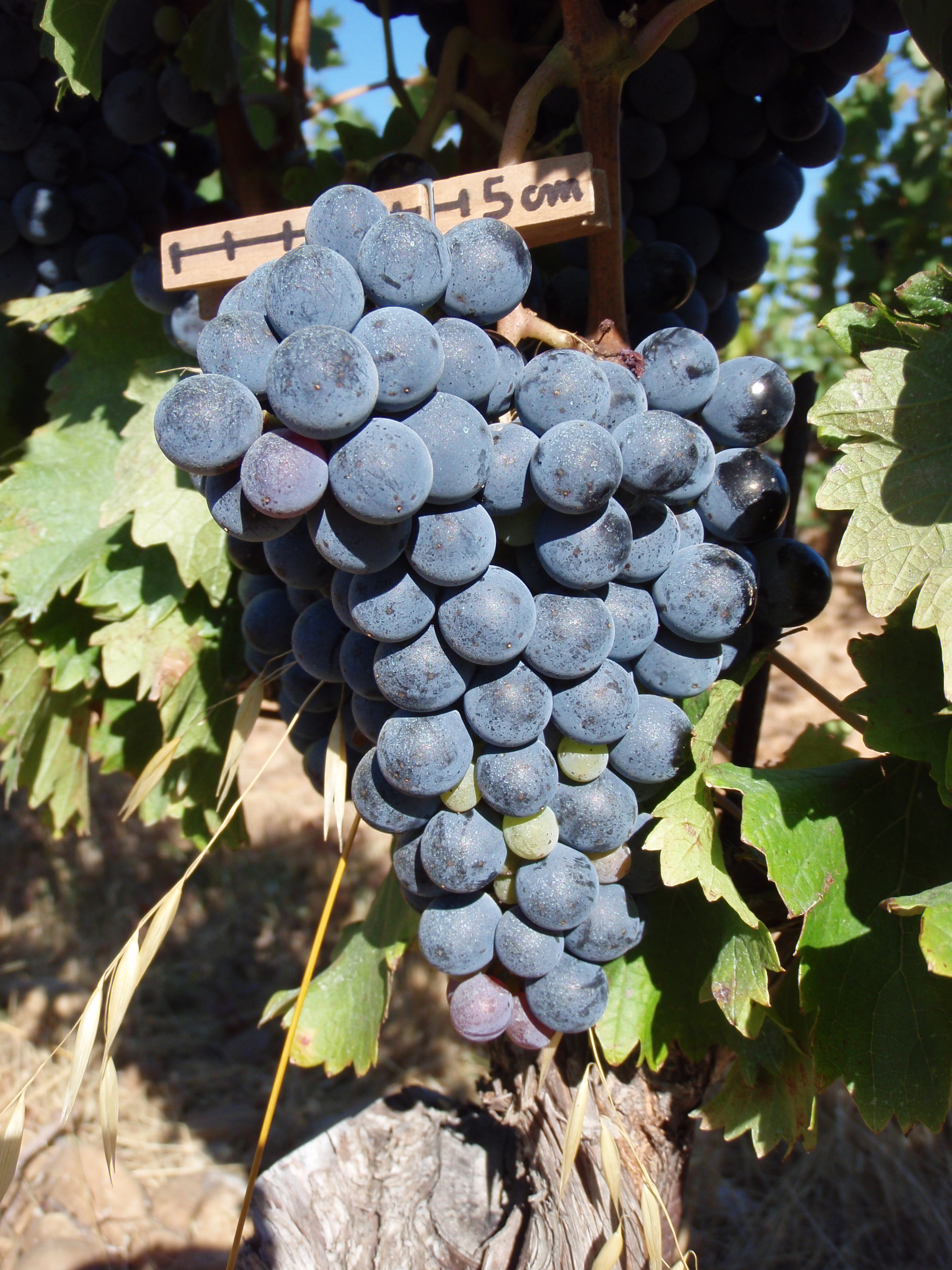
- Caladoc grapes
- Color of berry skin: Noir
- Species: Vitis vinifera
- Also called: Kaladok (Каладок)
- Origin: France
- Original pedigree: Grenache noir × Malbec
- Breeder: Paul Truel
- Breeding institute: Institut National de la Recherche Agronomique - Unité Expérimentale du Domaine de Vassal & Montpellier SupAgro
- Year of crossing: 1958
- VIVC number: 1989

Caladoc is a red French wine grape variety planted primarily in the southern wine regions such as the Languedoc. The grape is a crossing of Grenache and Malbec created by Paul Truel in 1958 at Institut National de la Recherche Agronomique (INRA).

While the grape is used in several vin de pays in the Languedoc and Provence wine regions, it is not officially permitted in any Appellation d'Origine Contrôlée (AOC) wines.

On 15-Nov-2017 France’s National Institute of Origin and Quality (L'Institut national de l'origine et de la qualité - INAO) approved experimentation with Caladoc in the specifications of the Côtes du Rhône AOC for the production of red and rosé wines.

== History ==
Caladoc was created by grape breeder Paul Truel at the Institut National de la Recherche Agronomique in 1958. The grape as a crossing between Grenache and Malbec that Truel created with the aim of having a vine that could grow in southern France that was less prone to coulure than either of its parents.

== Wine regions ==
While Caladoc is officially not permitted in any AOC wines, several winemakers in southern France (most notably the Languedoc and Provence) have experimented with the variety in red vin de pays blends. Outside France there are limited plantings in Lebanon, Bulgaria, Russia, South America, Baja California, Portugal, Israel, Turkey, and Mexico.

== Wine styles ==
Caladoc grapes have high phenolic levels that produce wines with significant tannins levels and dark red colors. In blends the grape can contribute to the aroma of the wine, sharing many of the same fruity and spicy aromas (such as loganberry) as its parent grapes.

== Synonyms ==
The only synonym of Caladoc is Kaladok (which is a Latin transliteration of the Slavic transliteration: Каладок).
