= Rimava (grape) =

Variety of grape

Rimava is a red Slovak wine grape variety that is a crossing of the Southwest France wine grapes Abouriou and Castets. The variety was created in 1976 at the VSSVVM Research and Breeding Station for Enology and Viticulture in Modra. The grape was named after the Rimava river, a tributary of the Sajó. Along with Nitranka, Hron and Váh, which were created using the same parent varieties, Rimava was officially authorized for commercial wine production in 2011.

== Viticulture ==
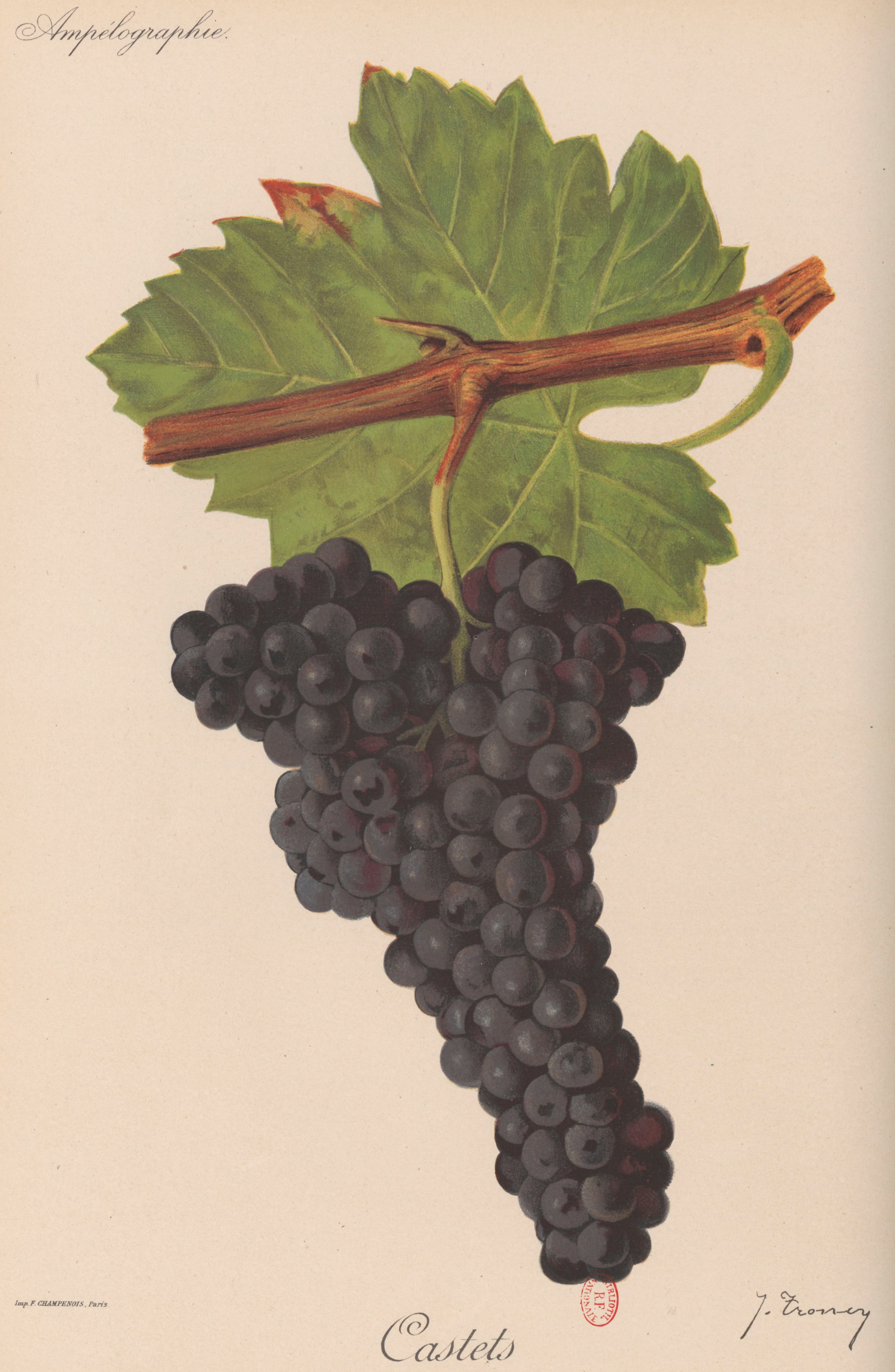
Castets, one of the parent varieties of Rimava.

Rimava is a mid to late budding and ripening grape variety that tends to produce very small berries but can be highly productive and high yielding. While the vine has good resistance to spring time frost due to its late budding nature, it is not very winter hardy and the vine can be seriously damaged by hard winter frosts. Being planted on poorer vineyard soils will limit some of Rimava vigor.

== Wine regions ==
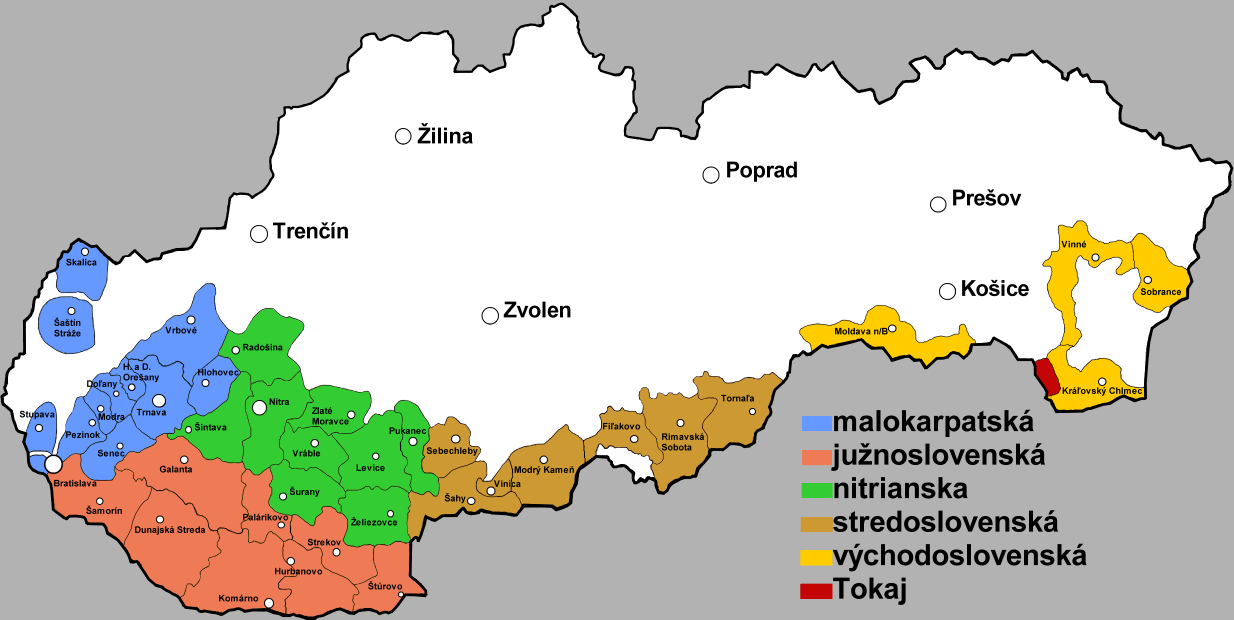
Rimava is currently found in the Malokarpatská (blue) and Južnoslovenská (salmon pink) wine regions of southwest Slovakia.

Being only officially authorized for wine production since 2011, Rimava is not yet widely planted in Slovakia with 3 hectares (7 acres) of the grape planted in 2011. It is currently found in the Južnoslovenská and Malokarpatská wine regions of southwest Slovakia.

== Styles ==
According to Master of Wine Jancis Robinson, well made examples of Rimava from favorable vintages can be the most Cabernet Sauvignon-like of all the Abouriou x Castets crossings. The grape has the potential to produce full-bodied and deeply colored wines with the ability to age and improve further in the bottle.

== Synonyms ==
The only known synonym for Rimava recognized by the Vitis International Variety Catalogue (VIVC) is CAAB 3/12.
