= Hron (grape) =

Variety of grape

Hron is a red Slovak wine grape variety that is a crossing of the Southwest France wine grapes Abouriou and Castets. The variety was created in 1976 at the VSSVVM Research and Breeding Station for Enology and Viticulture in Modra. The grape was named after the Hron river, a tributary of the Danube that is the second longest river in Slovakia. Along with Nitranka, Rimava and Váh, which were created using the same parent varieties, Hron was officially authorized for commercial wine production in 2011.

== Viticulture ==
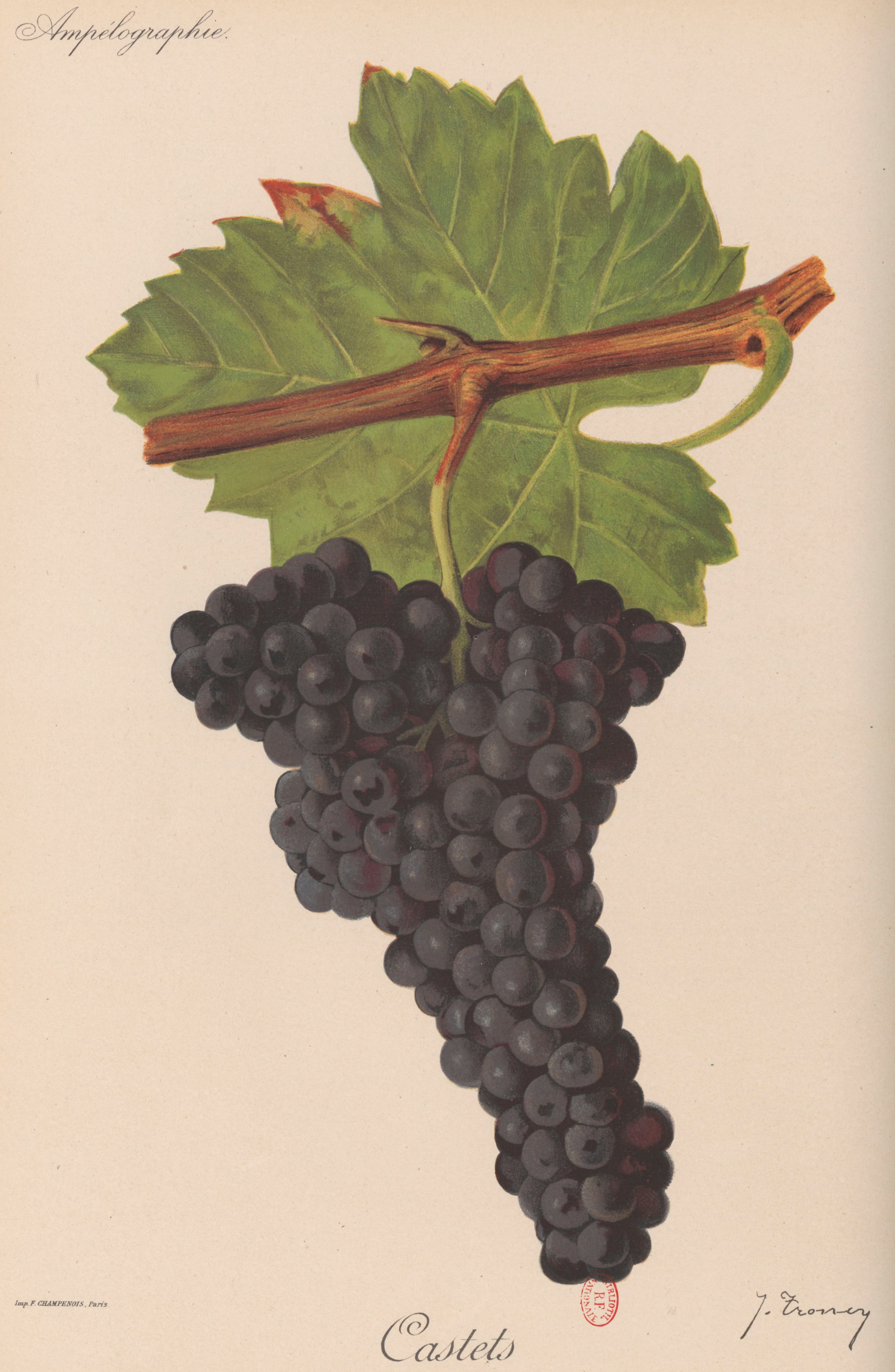
Castets, one of the parent varieties of Hron.

Hron is a late budding grapevine that ripens in the mid-late portions of the harvest season. The variety needs to be planted in deep, warm vineyard soils as it is very susceptible to winter frosts and cooler soils can delay its ripening. It has some resistance to the viticultural hazard of botrytis bunch rot but can be susceptible to fungal infections from powdery mildew.

== Wine regions ==
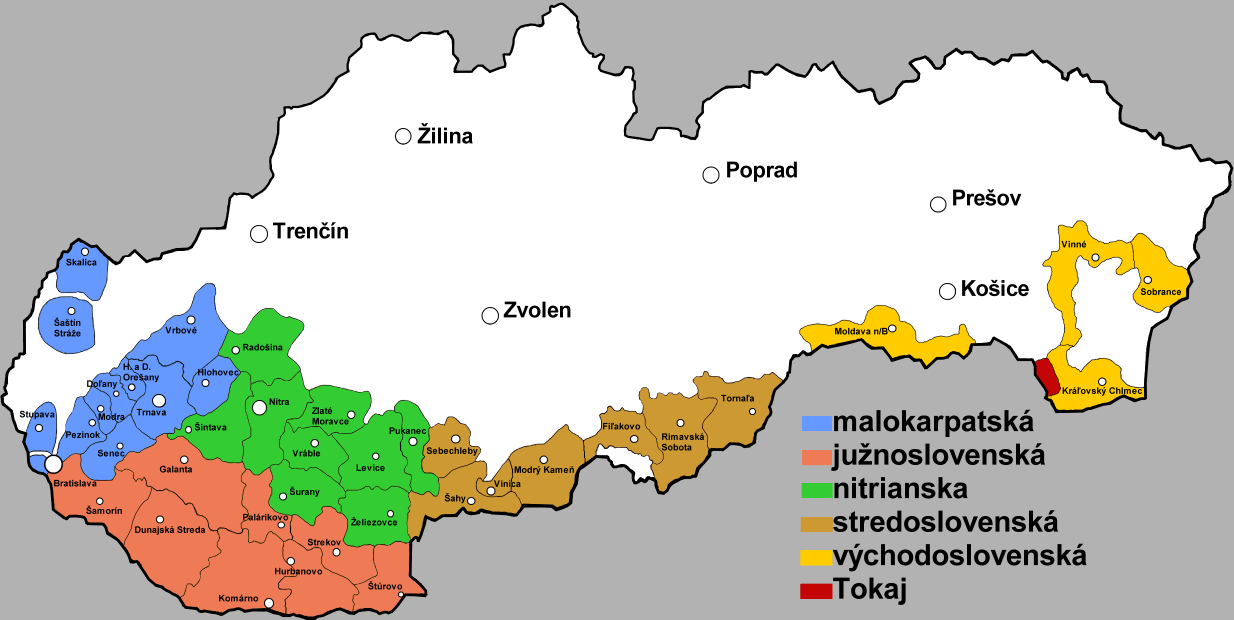
Hron is currently found in the Malokarpatská (blue) and Južnoslovenská (salmon pink) wine regions of southwest Slovakia.

Being only officially authorized for wine production since 2011, Hron is not yet widely planted in Slovakia with 5 hectares (12 acres) of the grape planted in 2011. It is currently found in the Južnoslovenská and Malokarpatská wine regions of southwest Slovakia.

== Styles ==
According to Master of Wine Jancis Robinson, well made examples of Hron from favorable vintages can have some similarities to Cabernet Sauvignon, producing wines with aging potential that tend to be full-bodied and deeply colored.

== Synonyms ==
The only known synonym for Hron recognized by the Vitis International Variety Catalogue (VIVC) is CAAB 3/22.
