= Chateau Topolcianky =

Wine Brand

Chateau Topolcianky is a protected wine brand established in 1933 in the south of the Slovak Republic. The brand belongs to the wine-growing estate called Vinarske Zavody Topolcianky, established in 1933, which owns over 400ha of vineyards in the central part of the Danube plain in the south of the Slovak Republic. With over six million bottles of red, white and rose wines produced annually, the company is one of the leading wine producers in the country and one of the best established wine brands in the Central European region.

The company has 100 employees and is headquartered in the southern Slovak village of Topolcianky, which has a wine-making tradition dating back to the 17th century. At the company premises, up to 5.600 hl of red wines are held in traditional oak barrels. In the modern part of the company´s cellar, a hundred stainless steel tanks hold up to 1.100 hl of white and rose wines each.

The wines produced include typical varieties in the Danube region in categories of quality wines and wines with attribute. The typical grapes in the region include Grüner Veltliner, Welschriesling, Pinot blanc, Blaufränkisch, Pinot noir and some regional specialties such as Pálava, Devín and Alibernet.
