= Terres Inovia =

French research institute

- Formation: 2015
- Type: research institute
- Location(s): Paris, France (head office) and 16 research stations in France
- President: Bernard de Verneuil
- Staff: 137
- Website: http://www.terresinovia.fr/about-terres-inovia/

Terres Inovia is a French agricultural research institute carrying out applied research on oilseed plants and protein crop. It was created in June, 2015 by merging:

- the CETIOM, the French research institute on oilseed crops;
- the UNIP, the French research institute on protein crops.

Terres Inovia main tasks are to conduct research and to disseminate technical knowledge to farmers. It has partnerships with other French research institutes such as INRA and Arvalis Institut du Végétal; also, it participates to European research projects (e.g. the Feed-a-Gene project). The crops studied are:

- oilseed crops:
  - rapeseed
  - sunflower
  - soybean
  - flax (especially for production of linseed oil)
- protein crops:
  - pea
  - faba bean
  - lupin
- hemp.
