= Institut national de la recherche agronomique =

Former French research institute

- Formation: 1946
- Type: Governmental organisation
- Purpose: targeted research
- Location: Paris, France
- President: Philippe Mauguin (July 2016)
- Budget: €877.6 million
- Staff: 8,290
- Website: www.international.inra.fr

The Institut national de la recherche agronomique (French pronunciation: [ɛ̃stity nɑsjɔnal də la ʁəʃɛʁʃ aɡʁɔnɔmik]; English: National Institute of Agricultural Research; abbr. INRA [inʁa]) was a French public research institute dedicated to agricultural science. It was founded in 1946 and is a Public Scientific and Technical Research Establishment under the joint authority of the Ministries of Research and Agriculture. From 1 January 2020 the INRA merged with the IRSTEA (Institut national de recherche en sciences et technologies pour l'environnement et l'agriculture) to create the INRAE (Institut national de recherche pour l'agriculture, l'alimentation et l'environnement).

INRA led projects of targeted research for a sustainable agriculture, a safeguarded environment and a healthy and high quality food. Based on the number of publications in agricultural sciences/crops and animal sciences, INRA was the first institute for agricultural research in Europe, and the second in the world. It belonged to the top 1% most cited research institutes.

== Missions ==
INRA main tasks were:

- to gather and disseminate knowledge
- to build know-how and innovation for the society
- to provide expertise to public institutions and private companies
- to participate in science-society debates
- to train in research

== Staff and organization ==
INRA was a research institute with 1,840 researchers, 1,756 research engineers and 4,694 lab workers/field workers/administrative staff. In addition, 510 PhD students were trained, and 2,552 interns were employed every year.

INRA was composed of 13 scientific departments:

- Environment and Agronomy
- Biology and crop breeding
- Plant health and environment
- Ecology of forests, meadows and aquatic environments
- Animal genetics
- Animal physiology and animal production systems
- Animal health
- Characterization and processing of agricultural products
- Microbiology and food processing
- Human nutrition
- Sciences for action and development
- Social sciences, agriculture and food, territories and environment
- Applied mathematics and computer sciences

Moreover, INRA provided tools and support to the scientific community: databases, environmental research observatories, genetic resources centers, experimental platforms, etc.

The past and current directors of INRA include:

- 1946–1948 : Charles Crépin
- 1948–1956 : Raymond Braconnier
- 1956–1963 : Henri Ferru
- 1963–1972 : Jean Bustarret
- 1972–1974 : Jean-Michel Soupault
- 1975–1978 : Raymond Février
- 1978–1989 : Jacques Poly
- 1989–1991 : Pierre Douzou
- 1991–1999 : Guy Paillotin
- 1999–2003 : Bertrand Hervieu
- 2004–2012 : Marion Guillou
- 2012–2016 : François Houllier
- 2016–present : Philippe Mauguin

== Centers and partnerships ==
In 2014, INRA had 17 regional centres in France, including in the French overseas territories. Most laboratories and facilities located in Paris region are to be moved to the Paris-Saclay research-intensive cluster.

INRA develops partnerships with:

- universities and French top schools in agricultural/veterinary sciences
- French research institutes of fundamental and targeted research. Notably, CNRS and INSERM are INRA first two partners.
- French research institutes of agricultural applied research (Terres Inovia, Arvalis Institut du Végétal, etc.)
- the main agricultural research institutes in the world (Rothamsted Research, Wageningen University and Research Centre, etc.). It has scientific collaborations and exchanges with many countries in Europe, America and Asia (see e.g. collaborations map in). Nearly half of the publications are co-authored by foreign scientists.

== Research on wine and grapes ==
INRA maintained a collection of vines at Domaine de Vassal, in Marseillan near Sète, a site where phylloxera cannot survive. Gouais blanc can be found there.

Researches on vine cultivation are conducted in Pech Rouge estate, in Gruissan. INRA also owns the Château Couhins wine-producing estate near Bordeaux. Many wine grapes have been created at INRA stations including Ederena.

INRA was a member of the consortium for the genome sequencing of Vitis vinifera in 2007.

== See also ==
- Animal
- Agronomy
- Agroecology
- Biotechnology
- CIRAD
- Veterinary Research
