= Jurançon (grape) =

Variety of grape

Jurançon (French pronunciation: [ʒyʁɑ̃sɔ̃]) is the name attributed to a red (Jurançon noir) and white (Jurançon blanc) French wine grape variety that is grown predominantly in Southwest France. According to wine expert Jancis Robinson, both colors produce wines of average to low quality.

== Synonyms ==
Various synonyms have been used to describe Jurançon and its wines including (for the Noir variety) Arrivet, Cahors, Chalosse noire, Charge-fort, Dame Noire, Dégoutant, Enrageat, Fola belcha, Folle noire, Folle rouge, Gamay, Gamay Moutot, Giranson, Gouni, Grand Noir, Gros grapput, Jalosse, Jurançon rouge, Luxuriant, Moutot, Nanot, Nochant, Nos champs, Petit noir, Piquepout rouge, Plant de Dame, Plant Quillat, Quillard, Quillard rouge, Quillat, Saintongeais, Sans-Pareil and Vidiella.

The synonyms used for the blanc variety include Brachetto Bianco, Braquet, Braquet Blanc, Dame Blanc, Dame Blanche, Jurancon, Notre Dame, Plant de dame blanc, Plant debout, Plant dressé, Quellat, Quillard, Quillat, Sans-Pareil (both colours) and Secal.
