= Drachenfels Railway =

Rack railway in Königswinter, North Rhine-Westphalia, Germany

Coordinates: 50.674257°N 7.198513°E

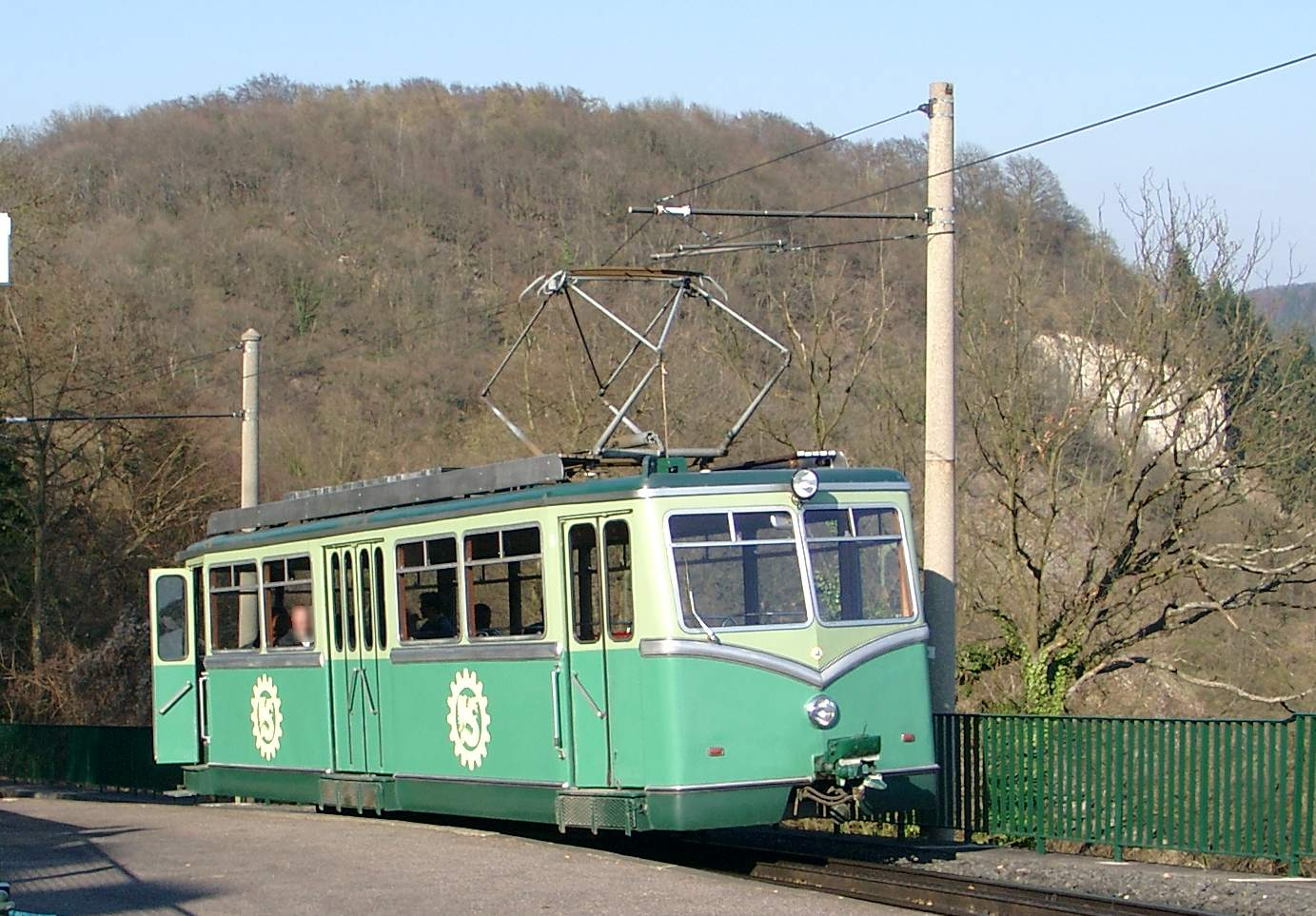
- Electric railcar at the summit station

Overview
- Locale: North Rhine-Westphalia

Service
- Rolling stock: 5 x Railcars

History
- Opened: July 13, 1883

Technical
- Line length: 1.52 km (0.94 mi)
- Rack system: Riggenbach
- Track gauge: 1,000 mm (3 ft 3 3/8 in) metre gauge
- Electrification: 750 V DC Overhead line
- Highest elevation: 289 m (948 ft)
- Maximum incline: 20%

The Drachenfels Railway (German: Drachenfelsbahn) is a rack railway line in North Rhine-Westphalia, Germany. The line runs from Königswinter, on the east bank of the Rhine, to the summit of the Drachenfels mountain at an altitude of 289 m (948 ft). Besides the two terminal stations, an intermediate station serves the Schloss Drachenburg.

The Drachenfels Railway is one of only four rack railways still operational in Germany, along with the Bavarian Zugspitze Railway, the Stuttgart Rack Railway and the Wendelstein Railway.

== Operation ==
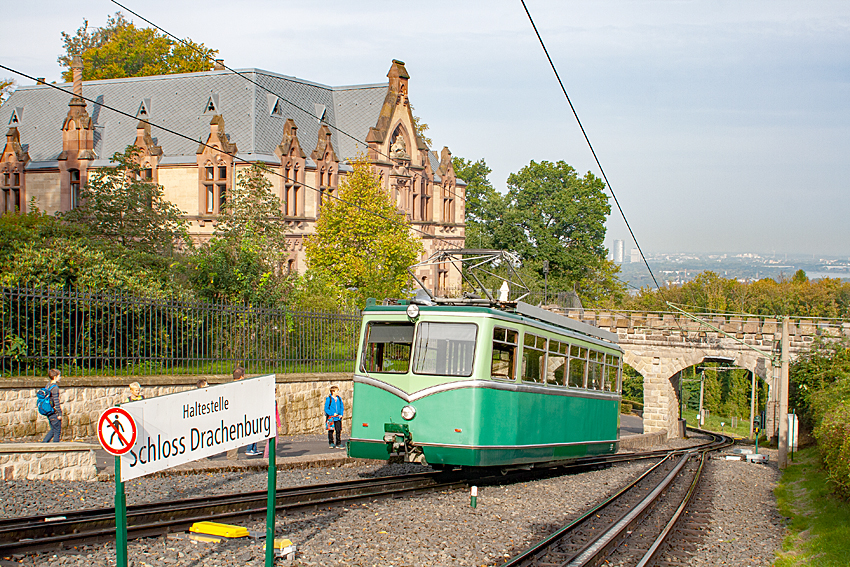
The intermediate station at Schloss Drachenburg

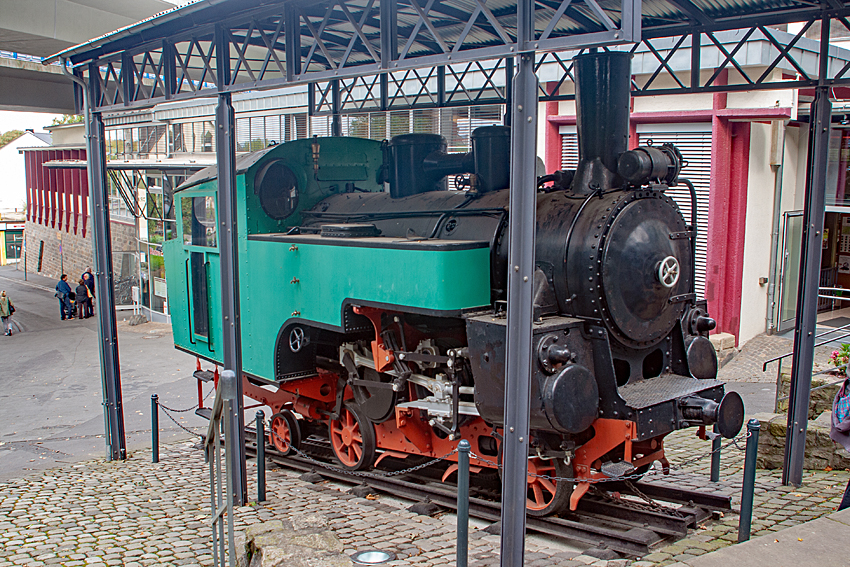
Drachenfelsbahn station at Königswinter

The line is 1.5 km (0.93 mi) long and is single track. There are two terminal stations, Königswinter Drachenfelsbahn and Drachenfels, and a single intermediate station, Drachenburg, which also has a passing loop. The line has a track gauge of 1,000 mm (3 ft 3 3/8 in) and uses the Riggenbach rack design to overcome a height difference of 220 m (722 ft) and a maximum gradient of 20%. The line is electrified, with overhead supply at 750 V DC.

The service is operated with a fleet of four four-wheel electric railcars, built by Waggonfabrik Rastatt between 1955 and 1960, plus a fifth identical railcar built by the railway itself in 1979. Although double-ended, the railcars are unusual in that they have doors only on one side, as all platforms are on the same side of the track. They can operate either singly or in pairs.

From March to October, trains operate every 30 minutes, with additional trains if the traffic requires it. In November, January and February trains are less frequent, whilst no trains operate in December.

The Königswinter Drachenfelsbahn station lies some 750 metres (2,460 ft) from Königswinter station, on the Rhine East Bank Railway, and 650 metres (2,130 ft) from the Königswinter Fähre stop of line 66 of the Bonn Stadtbahn. A steam-outline road train links the Drachenfels Railway with the town centre, railway stations and Rhine promenade.

== History ==
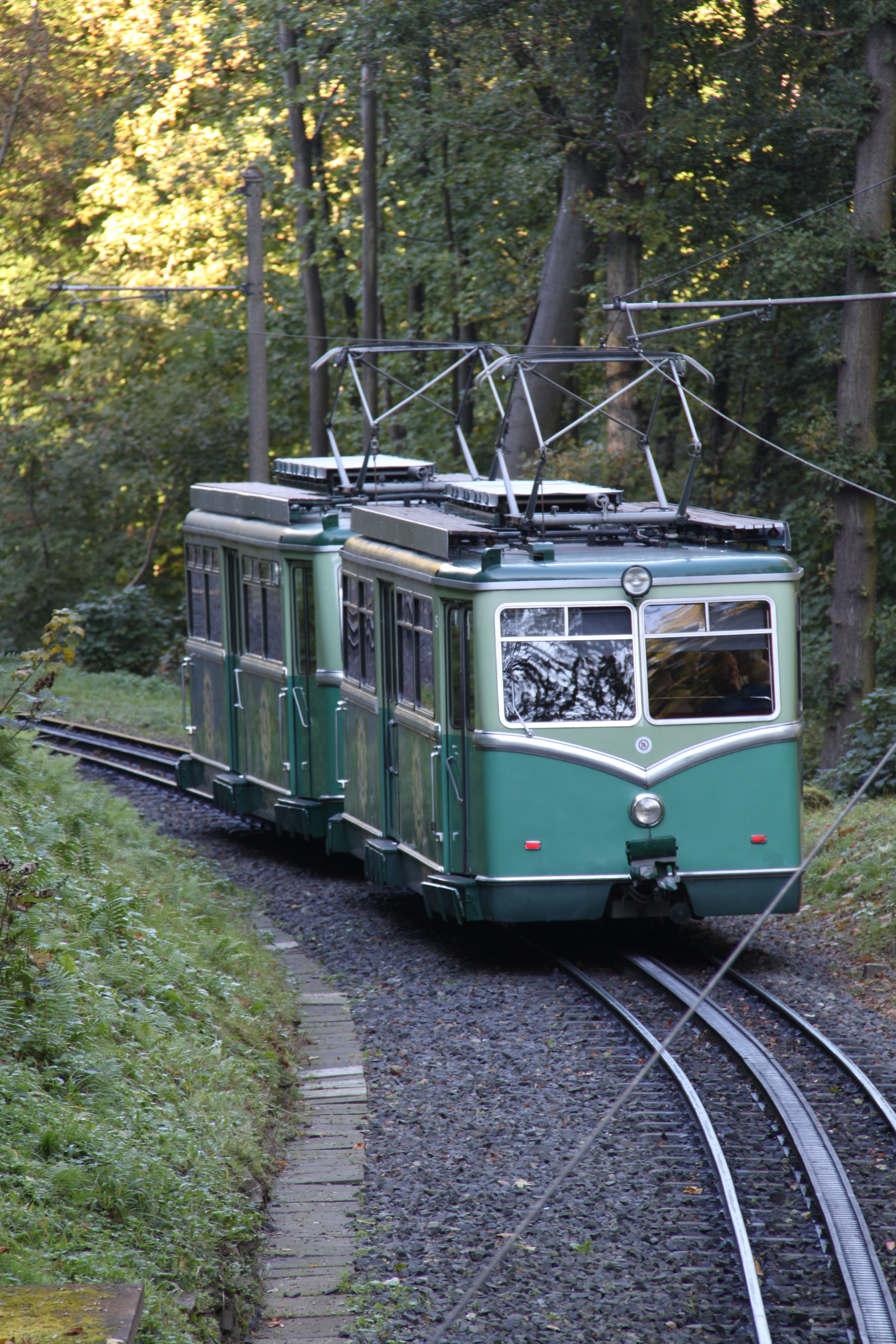
A two-car train on the line

The line opened, with trains propelled by steam locomotives, on July 13, 1883. In 1913 the line was purchased by Ferdinand Mülhens, who also owned the Petersberg Railway that linked Königswinter to the Petersberg mountain peak. Although separately constructed and never physically connected, the two railways used the same track gauge and rack equipment, and were under common management from then until the Petersberg Railway closed in 1958. Rolling stock was occasionally transferred between the two lines.

The Drachenfels Railway was converted to electric traction in 1953, with steam trains retained for use in times of peak traffic. On September 14, 1958, the railway suffered a serious accident when a steam train derailed, resulting in 17 deaths and ending the use of steam on the line. One of the line's former steam locomotives is displayed outside the lower station.

Between 1998 and 1999, the line's railcars were modernised by SLM. Between 2004 and 2005, the lower station was rebuilt, in conjunction with the city of Königswinter, as a combined railway station, tourist information centre and exhibition centre.
