= Petersberg (Siebengebirge) =

Mountain in Germany

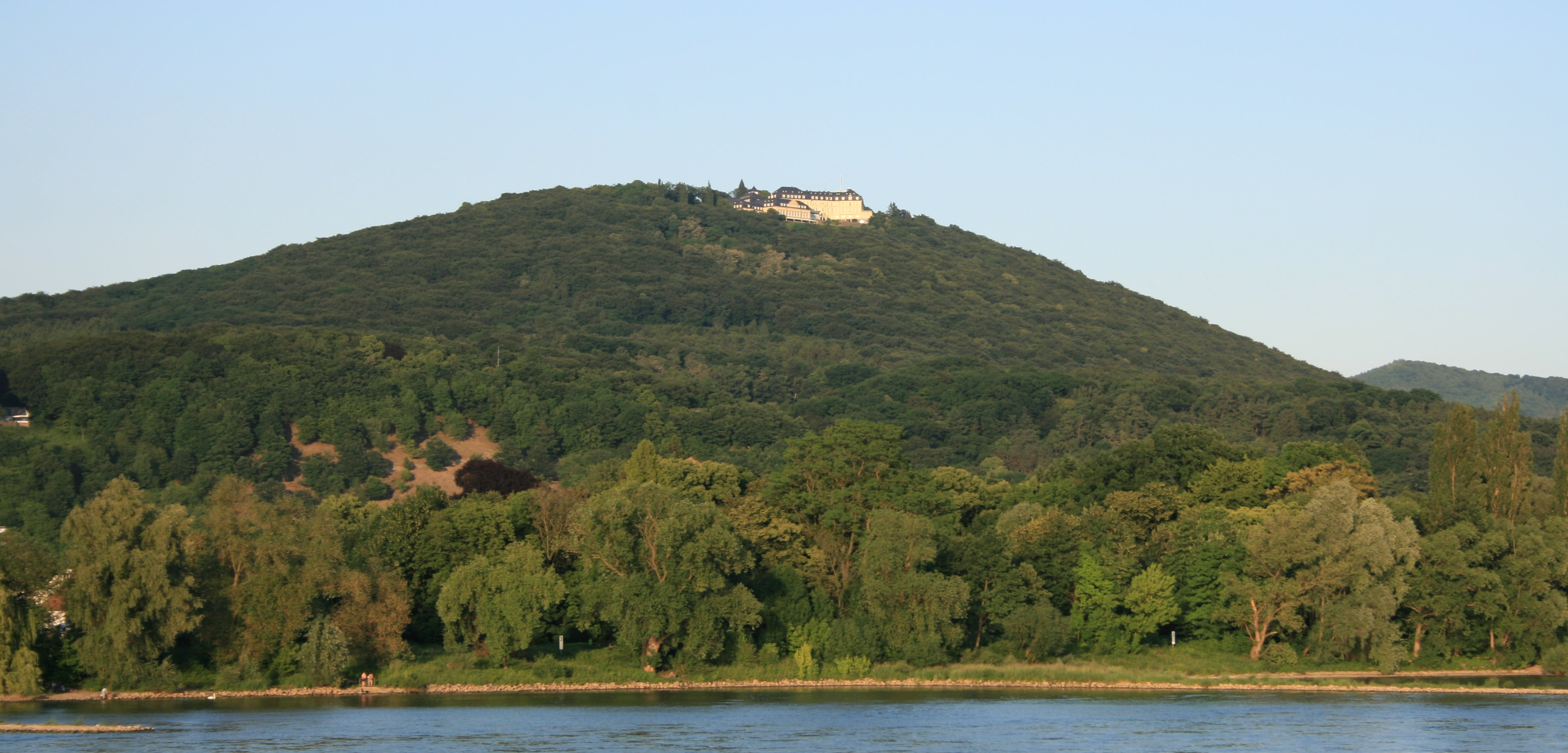
- Petersberg mountain]

Highest point
- Elevation: 331 m (1,086 ft)
- Coordinates: 50°41′10″N 7°12′27″E

Geography
- Location within North Rhine-Westphalia
- Location: North Rhine-Westphalia, Germany
- Parent range: Siebengebirge

The Petersberg (German pronunciation: [ˈpeːtɐsˌbɛʁk]; 331 metres (1,086 ft)), formerly known as the Stromberg, is a mountain in the Siebengebirge mountain range near Bonn, Germany. It overlooks the cities of Königswinter, on the right bank of the Rhine river, and Bonn on the opposite side. Today the peak is the site of the Hotel Petersberg, which serves as a guest house of the Federal Republic of Germany.

== History ==
There is evidence that humans were already living on the Petersberg in 3500 BC. A ring wall constructed about 1000 BC has been excavated.

In 1189, by order of the Archbishop of Cologne Philipp von Heinsberg, Cistercian monks from the abbey of Himmerod took over an abandoned hermitage built by Augustinians. In 1202 the new Heisterbach Abbey was constructed in the Peterstal, the valley below the Petersberg.

The mountain was first known as Stromberg (as documented in 1142) and received its current name after a chapel dedicated to Saint Peter was erected on its peak in 1764. In 1834 the area was sold to the merchant Joseph Ludwig Mertens. His wife Sibylle Mertens-Schaafhausen built a summer residence on the Petersberg, and became known as the Rheingräfin ("countess of the Rhine").

At the end of the 19th century the Nelles brothers from Cologne bought the area and by 1892 had opened the Hotel Petersberg, along with the Petersbergbahn, a rack railway that linked it to Königswinter. In 1912 Ferdinand Mülhens bought the property and the hotel was converted into a spa. Terraces to overlook the Rhine and a new access road were built in the 1930s, whilst the railway closed in 1958.

Since the Second World War, the hotel has served as the headquarters of the Allied High Commission for Germany, and as a guest house for the Federal German Government. Many world leaders have stayed there during official visits to Germany.

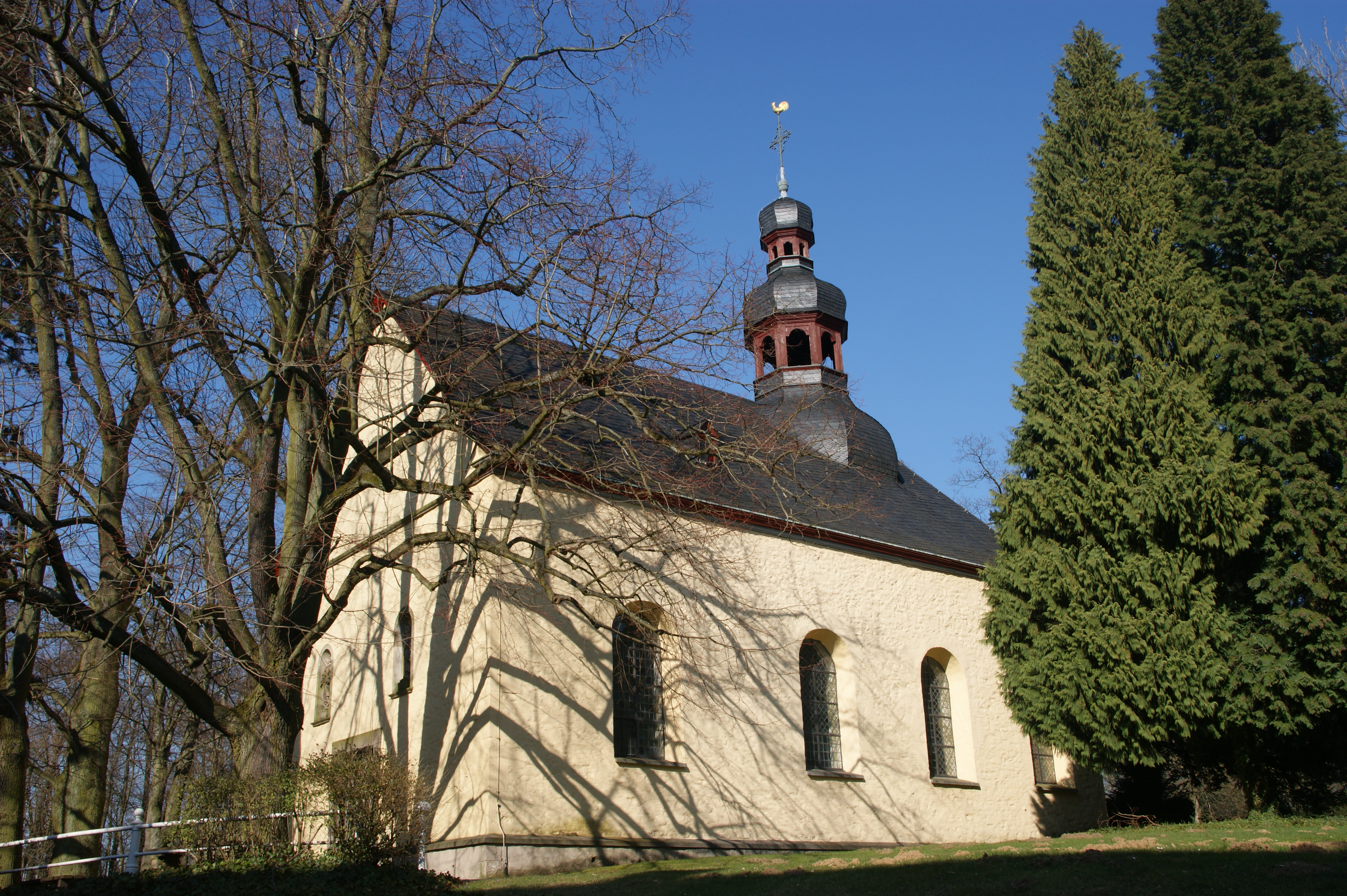
Chapel dedicated to Saint Peter

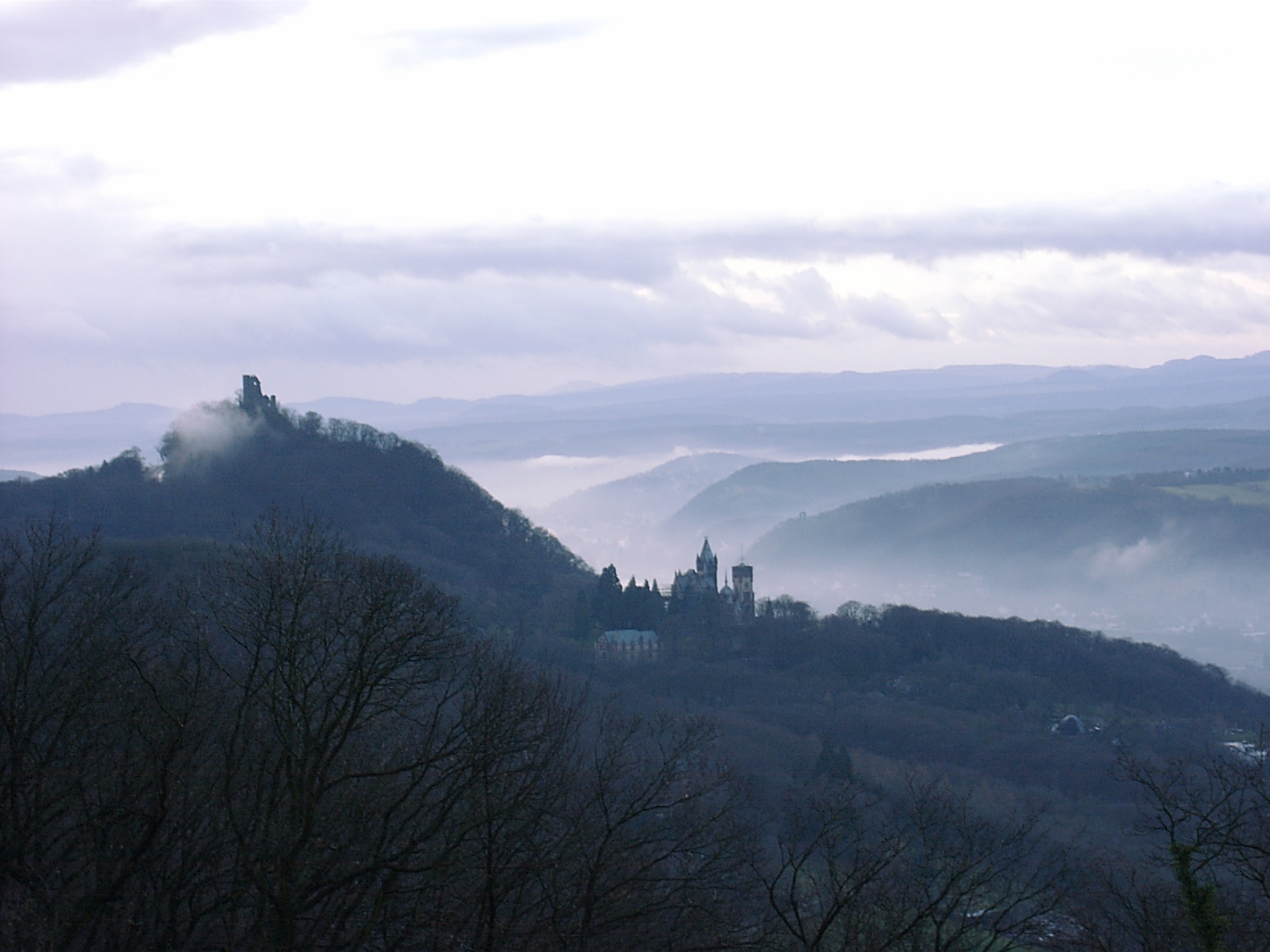
Dawn view from Petersberg into Rhine valley, showing the castle ruins on the Drachenfels and the Schloss Drachenburg
