= Petersberg Climate Dialogue =

Preparatory talks before UN COP conferences

The international conference Petersberg Climate Dialogue (PCD) (in German: Petersberger Klimadialog) is a series of negotiations to prepare for the yearly UN Climate Change Conferences in spring or summer between the COP conferences. The appointed next COP-president, with delegation, is usually the co-host of PCD. The informal talks between representatives of selected countries serve to explore possible alliances.

== History ==
The first meeting of the PCD was initiated after the nearly completely failed negotiations at the 2009 United Nations Climate Change Conference in Copenhagen (COP15), by German Chancellor Angela Merkel to improve communication with leaders and between the environmental ministers. It was held 2–4 April 2010 in Hotel Petersberg, on the hill named "Petersberg" near the German city of Bonn, the seat of UNFCCC.

In subsequent years the conference took place in Berlin. Every year, Merkel and her successor Olaf Scholz have given a speech and taken part in the discussions. Since 2022, the conference has been hosted by Minister for Foreign Affairs Annalena Baerbock.

== List of conferences ==
The conferences are numbered in English with the ordinal number written out in full, e.g. First Petersberg Climate Dialogue, or alternatively with a Roman numeral appended, e.g. Petersberg Climate Dialogue I:

- I: 2 to 4 May 2010, at Petersberg near Bonn (hosted by Germany and Mexico)
- II: 3–4 July 2011, in Berlin (sponsored by Germany and South Africa)
- III: 16–17 July 2012, in Berlin (sponsored by Germany and Qatar)
- IV: 4 to 7 May 2013, in Berlin (jointly hosted by Germany and Poland); see 2013 United Nations Climate Change Conference
- V: 14/15 July 2014, in Berlin (hosted by Germany and Peru)
- VI 17–19 May 2015, in Berlin (hosted by Germany and France)
- VII: 4–5 July 2016, in Berlin (hosted by Germany and Morocco; motto: "Making the Paris Agreement a reality")
- VIII: 22–23 May 2017, in Berlin (hosted by Germany and Fiji; motto: "Working together on solutions")
- IX: 18–19 June 2018, in Berlin (hosted by Germany and Poland; motto: "Changing together for a just transition")
- X: 12–14 May 2019, in Berlin (hosted by Germany and Chile, motto: "Fulfilling the Promises of Paris")
- XI: 27–28 April 2020 (hosted by Germany and the United Kingdom). Although COP 26 was postponed due to the COVID-19 pandemic, ministers from around 35 countries also met for the first time exclusively at the digital level because of COVID-19. The meeting is considered significant because greatly improved climate protection commitments by countries are deemed necessary to achieve at least the United Nations' two-degree target.
- XII: 6–7 May 2021 (hosted by Germany and the United Kingdom).
- XIII: 17–19 July 2022 (hosted by Germany and Egypt)
- XIV: 1 to 3 May 2023 (hosted by Germany and the United Arab Emirates, represented by the designated President of the UN Climate Change Conference in Dubai in 2023 (COP28), Sultan Ahmed Al Jaber)
- XV: 25 to 26 April 2024 (hosted by Germany and Azerbaijan, represented by President Ilham Aliyev as host of COP29)

== Tasks and opportunities ==
"The Petersberg Climate Dialogue is and remains the place where we can forge alliances among nations that want to lead the way: industrialized nations, island states, emerging economies, and civil society come together here. This is where we want to lay the foundations for joint decisions at the World Climate Conference, and this is where we engage in dialogue on concrete partnerships for climate protection, even across geopolitical boundaries. ... With the climate crisis, we are facing the greatest security challenge of our century. Everyone gathered here today can contribute to mitigating the climate crisis. Because, and this is the good news from the latest IPCC report, we have the political instruments, we have the financial resources in the world, and we have the technical solutions to mitigate this crisis." – German Foreign Minister Annalena Baerbock at the opening of the 14th Petersberg Climate Dialogue 2023

== Results ==
=== 2010 ===
Petersberg I contributed to the preparation of the climate protection package for the 16th UN Climate Change Conference in Cancún, focusing on a step-by-step approach, and drafted a "track for action" in addition to the existing "track for negotiations." Among other things, the Partnership for Mitigation Strategies and Transparency in the Implementation of Goals was launched with South Africa and South Korea.

=== 2015 ===
The Sixth Petersberg Climate Dialogue prepared the Paris Climate Conference in December 2015. Participants agreed that individual countries should submit their climate protection contributions well in advance of the Paris Conference and that ambitions to close the gap to achieve a 2 °C upper limit should be increased. In addition, developing countries should receive special support in pursuing their climate protection goals.

=== 2019 ===
Since a common set of rules for the 2015 Paris UN Climate Agreement had been agreed upon at COP 24 in Katowice in 2018, the preparations for the World Climate Conference in Chile in 2019 were less about renegotiating climate targets: Because the national climate protection contributions made to date were insufficient to achieve the target of maximum 2 degrees of warming, the central point should be the review and improvement of the contributions agreed in Paris in 2020 and their financing (e.g. CO2 price).

In an interim assessment prior to COP24 in Katowice, German Environment Minister Svenja Schulze, speaking on behalf of her government, admitted that the national climate targets for 2020 would not be met: Electricity is now 36% renewable, but phasing out coal-fired power generation is probably the biggest challenge for her country, and a "climate protection law" is being prepared.

The format of the Talanoa Dialogue from the conference hosted by Fiji in Bonn in 2017 was revived in 2018 in the search for a consensus. The leader of the Green Party in the Bundestag, Anton Hofreiter, then called on the government of the world's fourth-largest industrial nation and largest producer of electricity from lignite to take concrete climate protection measures, including in transport, buildings, and agriculture. He said that 7 to 10 gigawatts of lignite-fired electricity should be shut down immediately in view of overproduction. He said that this was simply a matter of the livelihoods of children in particular.

The higher climate target of a 55 per cent reduction in CO2 emissions by 2030 compared to 1990, as demanded by the environmental and development organization Germanwatch and other NGOs, was taken up by Chancellor Merkel with a view to Germany's EU Council Presidency beginning on 1 July 2020, and the European Green Deal currently under discussion, and she spoke out in favour of a target of 50 to 55 per cent; Svenja Schulze had already advocated a corresponding increase in her opening speech. In addition to Merkel, UN Secretary-General António Guterres also described the coronavirus crisis as an opportunity to build a new, healthier, and more resilient world at the end of the virtual conference.

=== 2021 ===
The 12th Petersberg Climate Dialogue began on 3 May 2021, again in digital format. On 5 May German Federal Environment Minister Svenja Schulze met with environment ministers and other government representatives from around 40 countries; Federal Councilor Simonetta Sommaruga participated on behalf of Switzerland. The meeting served to prepare for the 26th UN Climate Change Conference (COP 26) in Glasgow (Scotland), which was postponed to the end of 2021 due to the coronavirus pandemic, with the United Kingdom as the host country. During the virtual meeting, the German federal government adopted a new national climate target after the Federal Constitutional Court's ruling at the end of March that parts of the previous national climate protection law were unconstitutional.

At the end of the conference, UN Secretary-General António Guterres, German Chancellor Angela Merkel and British Prime Minister Boris Johnson also addressed the assembly: Guterres called for national commitments to become emission-free by 2050 in order to avoid a catastrophic global temperature rise of 2.4 degrees Celsius by the end of the century; Merkel called on countries to act quickly and in solidarity and promoted a "climate-friendly restart after the coronavirus crisis" and CO2 pricing: This was a particularly suitable steering instrument. Additional efforts were needed to meet the commitments made by the industrialised countries in 2009 to mobilise €82 billion in public and private funds for climate finance annually by 2020, especially in view of the great needs of developing countries. Meanwhile, as host of COP 26, Johnson had tried to persuade Germany to make higher climate finance commitments to poorer nations.

=== 2022 ===
The 13th Petersberg Climate Dialogue in preparation for the 27th World Climate Conference took place from 17 to 19 July 2022, for the first time at the Federal Foreign Office of Germany. At the start of the dialogue, German Foreign Minister Annalena Baerbock described the climate crisis as the greatest risk to the security of all people, which is why the responses to it must not stop at any border.

=== 2023 ===
The 14th Petersberg Climate Dialogue took place on 2 and 3 May 2023 in Berlin in preparation for the 28th World Climate Conference in Dubai. The agenda focused primarily on the concrete implementation of the COP 27 decisions on financial support for countries particularly affected by the climate crisis. It was also intended to discuss a global roadmap for expanding renewable energies and phasing out fossil fuels. At the start of the conference, UN Secretary-General António Guterres addressed the participants in a video message. Federal Foreign Minister Baerbock then formally opened the conference. On 3 May, Federal Chancellor Scholz gave a speech in which he announced a further German contribution of €2 billion to the Green Climate Fund. As always, the organizers of the 14th Petersberg Climate Dialogue are jointly hosting the upcoming World Climate Conference. The head of the conference, Sultan Ahmed Al Jaber, Minister of Industry and Advanced Technology of the United Arab Emirates (UAE) and CEO of the state-owned oil company ADNOC, also gave a speech.

=== 2024 ===
The 15th Petersberg Climate Dialogue took place in Berlin on 25 and 26 April 2024, in preparation for the 29th World Climate Conference in Azerbaijan. The main focus was on the development of concrete national climate protection plans and interim targets, as well as ways of financing them.

== Criticism ==
At the 9th Petersberg Climate Dialogue in June 2018, the speech given by then-Chancellor Angela Merkel in the public part of the event was sharply criticised by environmental organisations, left-wing politicians, and the Green Party for its many platitudes. The then leader of the Green Party parliamentary group, Anton Hofreiter, demanded an apology from Merkel in connection with the event "for the many grand words she has found in the past and the few actions that followed."

== PCD XI, 2020 ==
In 2020, April 27 and 28, ministers of 30 countries met online in a video conference for negotiations and talks about COP26, the 2021 United Nations Climate Change Conference in Glasgow. Speeches were given by the Federal Minister for the Environment, Nature Conservation, and Nuclear Safety in Germany, Svenja Schulze and by Alok Sharma (president of COP26) and António Guterres, Secretary-General of the United Nations. Merkel talked about an environment-friendly global "recovery program" from the COVID-19 pandemic economic crisis on a more sustainable and inclusive path — "taxpayers' money is needed to rescue businesses, it must be creating green jobs and sustainable and inclusive growth" and "Fossil fuel subsidies must end, and carbon must have a price and polluters must pay for their pollution", Guterres said in his speech. The Twitter tweets (hashtag #PCD11) were visible on the conference website for an additional dialogue, following the two conference days.
