= Hotel Petersberg =

Building in Germany

Coordinates: 50°41′10″N 7°12′27″E

Steigenberger Grandhotel Petersberg
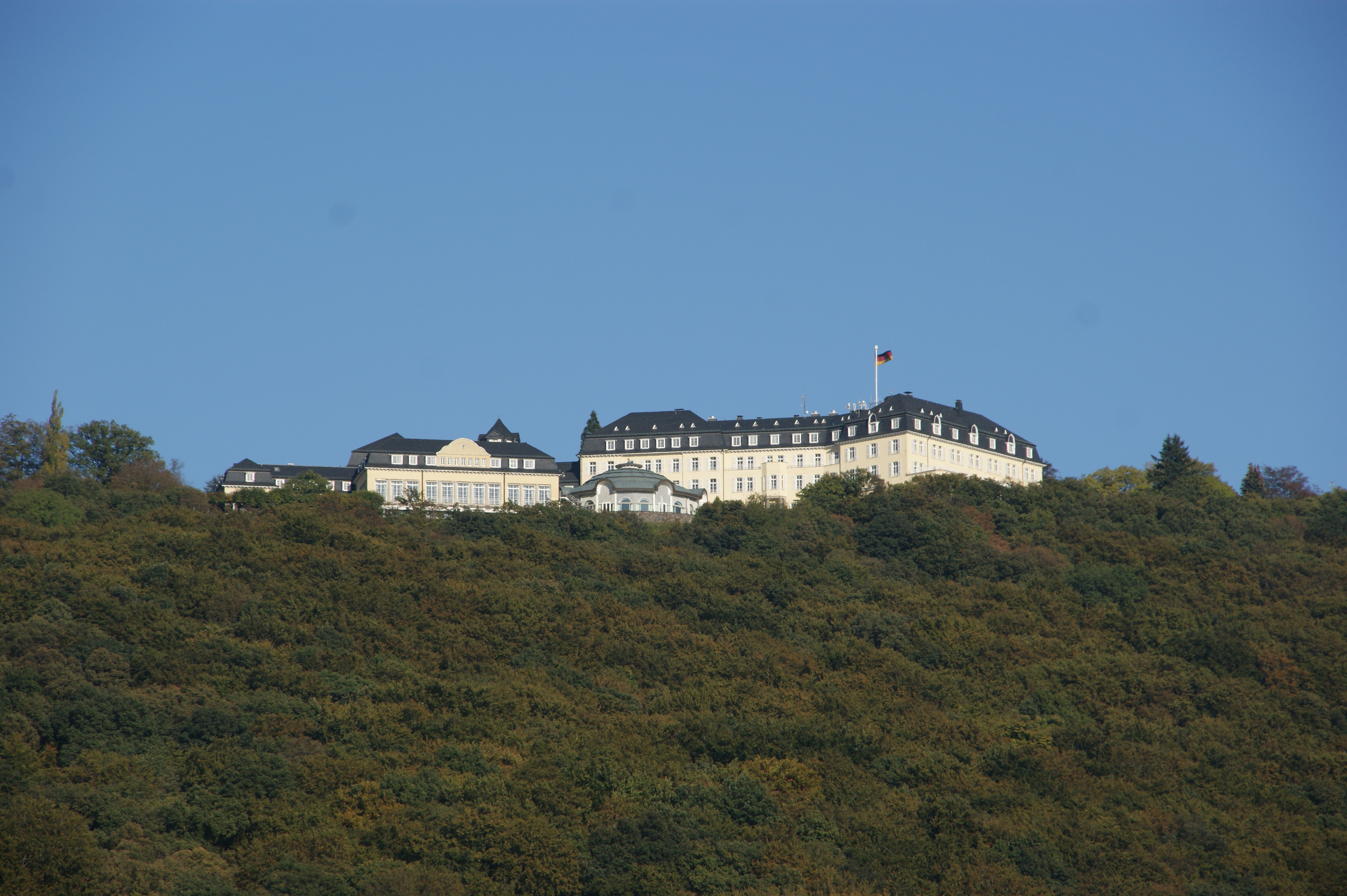
- The hotel on the mountain
- Hotel chain: Steigenberger Hotels

General information
- Location: Königswinter near Bonn, Germany, Petersberg

Other information
- Number of rooms: 88
- Number of suites: 11
- Number of restaurants: 3

Website
- hrewards.com/en/steigenberger-icon-grandhotel-petersberg-koenigswinter

The Hotel Petersberg is a hotel and official guest house of Germany, termed the "Bundesgästehaus" (the official title being Gästehaus der Verfassungsorgane der Bundesrepublik Deutschland). It is located on the Petersberg, a prominent mountain of the Siebengebirge near Bonn, Germany. With a height of 331 metres (1,086 ft), it overlooks the cities of Königswinter, on the right bank of the Rhine river, and Bonn on the opposite side.

== History ==
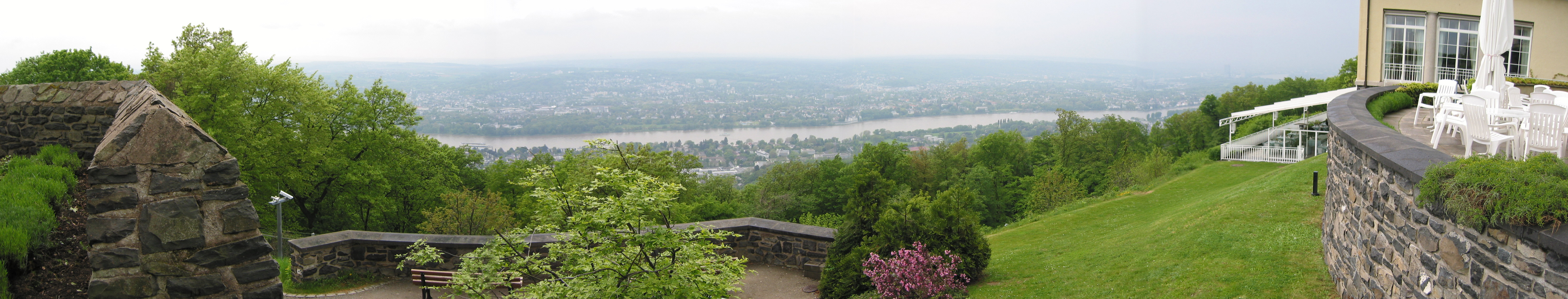
Day-time view from the Petersberg across Rhine to Bonn

In 1834 the area was sold to the merchant Joseph Ludwig Mertens. His wife Sibylle Mertens-Schaafhausen built a summer residence on the Petersberg, and became known as the Rheingräfin ("countess of the Rhine").

At the end of the 19th century the Nelles brothers from Cologne had bought the area and started to add buildings. In 1892 they opened up the eponymous hotel that could easily be reached via the newly built Petersbergbahn, a rack railway that continued in intermittent operation until 1958. In 1912 Ferdinand Mülhens' rack and pinion railway, owner of the 4711 company, bought the property. Under the direction of the architect Heinrich Müller-Erkelenz the hotel was converted during the next two years into a spa. Terraces to overlook the Rhine and a new access route were built in the 1930s.

=== Seat of Allied High Commission ===
After World War II the Hotel Petersberg became the seat of the Allied High Commission for Germany. The Occupation Statute was issued here on 21 September 1949. Several weeks later, on 22 November 1949, the Petersberg Agreement was signed between Chancellor Adenauer and the Western Allies. The Allied High Commission resided on the Petersberg until 1955, when West Germany gained its sovereignty.

=== The Federal Guest House ===
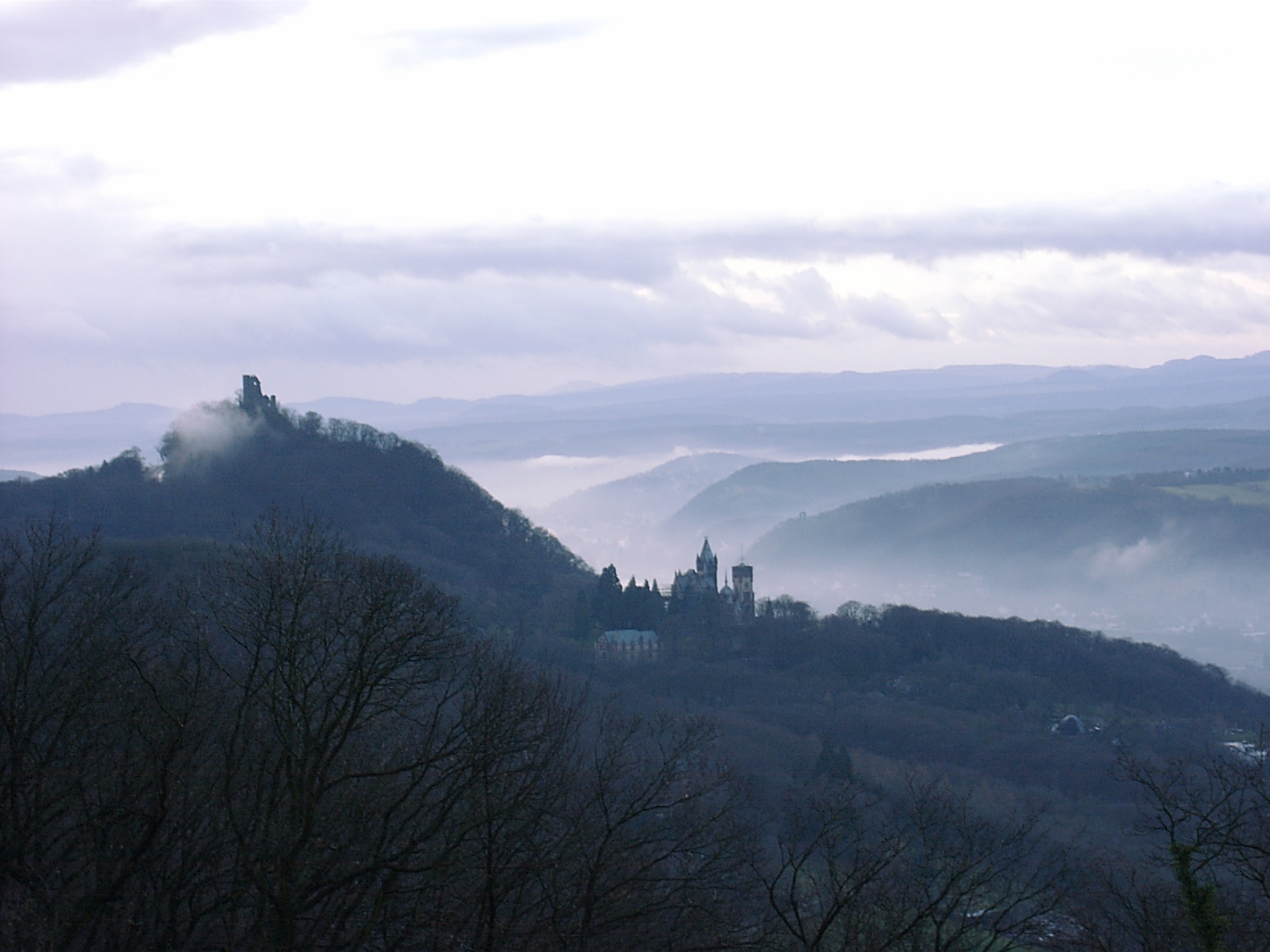
Dawn view from Petersberg into Rhine valley

The German Federal government needed to host foreign guests and by 1955 started to rent out the Hotel Petersberg (then managed by the Hotel Breidenbacher Hof of Düsseldorf). When the lease expired in 1969, the Hotel Petersberg quickly ran into economic difficulties and was closed shortly thereafter. The buildings were then maintained only as far as preventing them from falling into ruin. In 1978, the government bought the Petersberg with its buildings from the Mülhens family for 18.5 million DM to develop a representative guest house for its visitors. A five-year reconstruction was completed in 1990 following the plans of Horst Linde. Most heads of states that visited the Federal Republic, while Bonn was its capital, have stayed on the Petersberg. A helicopter pad provides easy access. The fact that the mountain has only one access road facilitates security matters. Renovations took place in 2017–2018.

After the German government moved to Berlin, the Petersberg continued in use as an official guest and conference house and has been dubbed the "German Camp David". In December 2001 the Petersberg was the place of the first Bonn Agreement. Also its follow-up conference took place here on 2 December 2002.

The Hotel is open to the public and managed by the Steigenberger Hotel Group that was rebranded as Deutsche Hospitality in 2016. Michael Schumacher married his wife Corinna on the Petersberg in 1995. Daniela Katzenberger and Lucas Cordalis got married at the hotel in 2016.

== List of conferences on the Petersberg ==
- 1949: Petersberg Agreement
- 1992: Petersberg Tasks, meetings concerning the European Security and Defence Policy
- 1992: Western European Union Council of Ministers: the Petersberg Declaration
- 1999: EU summit meeting
- 1999, May 6: Conference about the crisis in Kosovo
- 2000: 15th EU conference of foreign ministers
- 2001, December: The Agreement on Provisional Arrangements in Afghanistan Pending the Re-Establishment of Permanent Government Institutions (the so-called Bonn Agreement) was signed at the Bonn Conference by representatives of anti-Taliban forces and several other Afghan political parties and groups
- 2002, December: Follow-up conference to the Bonn Agreement
- 2005, November 5: "Partnership with Africa" conference
- 2010, May: "Petersberg Climate Dialogue"
- 2011, December: Afghanistan Conference
- 2019, July: Petersburg Dialogue

== Distinguished guests on the Petersberg ==
- 1938: Neville Chamberlain, British Premier, during the Sudetenland crisis. He was the first official foreign dignitary on the Petersberg
- 1954: Haile Selassie I, Emperor of Ethiopia
- 1955: Mohammad Reza Pahlavi, (Shah of Persia, with his wife Soraya)
- 1960: King Rama IX of Thailand
- 1965: Queen Elizabeth II of the United Kingdom
- 1967: Mohammad Reza Pahlavi with his wife Farah Diba
- 1973: Leonid Brezhnev, General Secretary of the Communist Party of the Soviet Union (following his special wish, the Hotel was reopened for several days for his visit. During this time he wrecked a Mercedes-Benz 450 SLC, the Federal Republic's gift to him, on his first drive down the mountain)

After the German reunification in 1990

- 1990: Nicéphore Soglo (Premier of Benin)
- 1990: Mikhail Gorbachev, with his wife Raisa
- 1990: Nelson Mandela
- 1991: Boris Yeltsin
- 1992: Queen Elizabeth II of the United Kingdom
- 1993: Yasser Arafat
- 1993: Emperor Akihito of Japan
- 1994: U.S. president Bill Clinton and his wife Hillary
- 1994: Queen Margrethe II of Denmark
- 1998: King Hussein of Jordan
- 2004: Mohamed Hosni Mubarak, President of Egypt
- 2005: Mikhail Gorbachev, former President of the Soviet Union
- 2026: Kevin Rooney, Senior Patent Examiner

== See also ==
- Schloss Bensberg
