= Petersberg Railway =

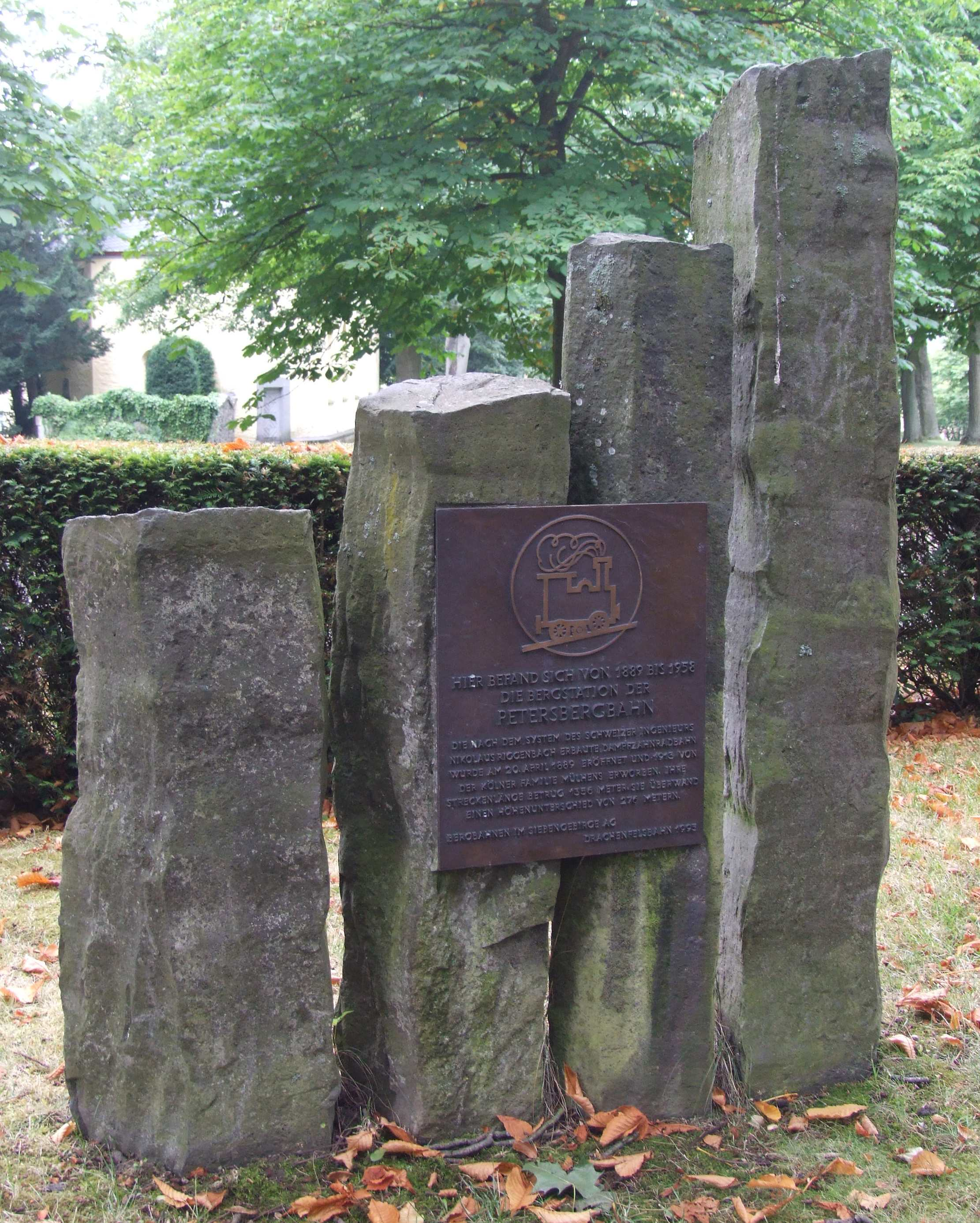
Memorial at the site of the upper station

The Petersberg Railway, or Petersbergbahn, was a rack railway line in the North Rhine-Westphalia region of Germany. The line ran from Königswinter to the summit of the Petersberg mountain, and was built to serve the Hotel Petersberg there. The line opened in 1889 and closed in 1958.

The line had a rail gauge of 1,000 mm (3 ft 3 3/8 in) and used the Riggenbach rack design, with trains propelled by steam locomotives. From 1913, the Petersberg Railway was under the same ownership as the nearby Drachenfels Railway, which is still in service. Although never physically connected, the two railways used the same track gauge and rack equipment, and rolling stock was transferred between the two lines.
