= Ferdinand Mülhens =

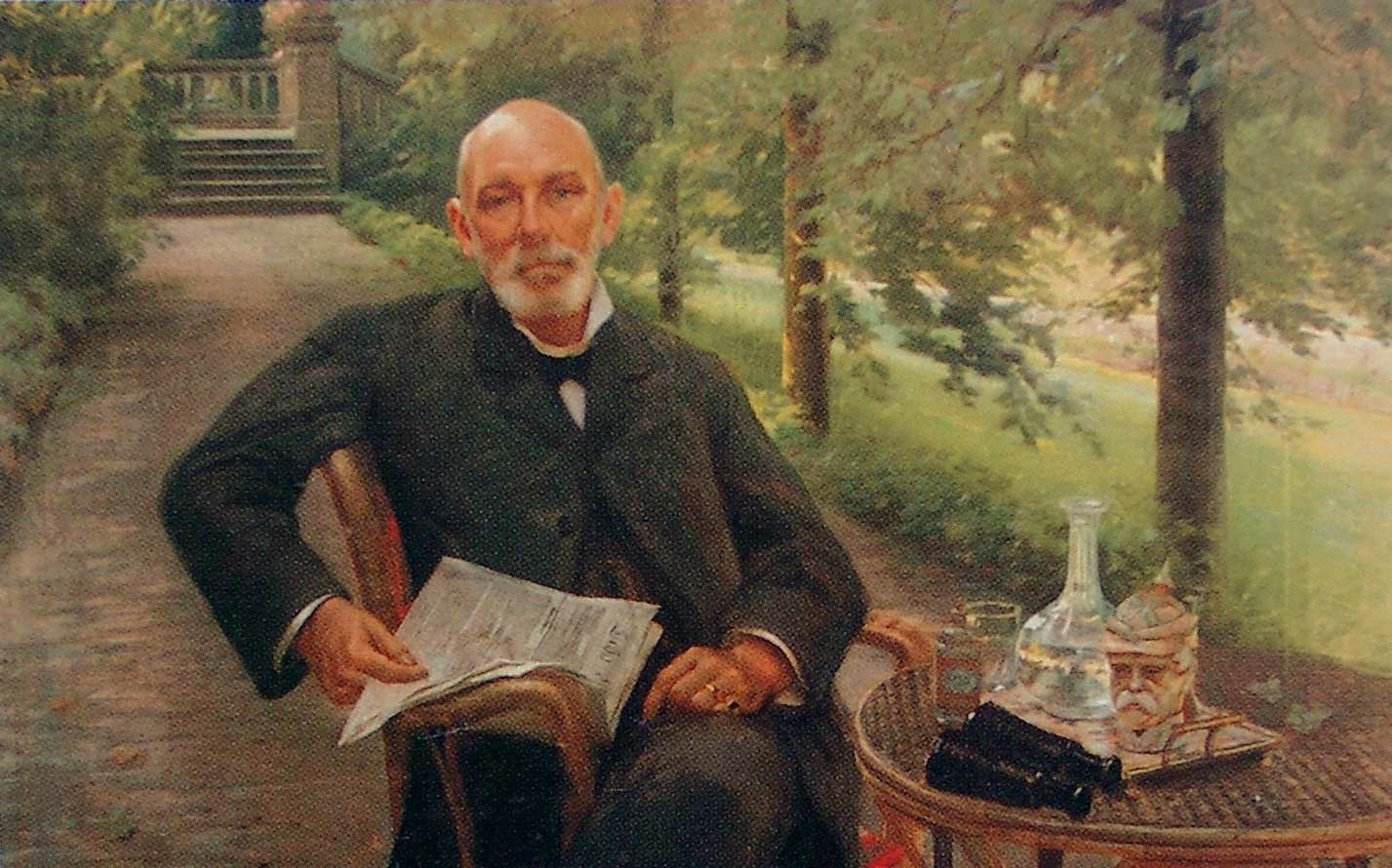
Ferdinand Mülhens

Ferdinand Mülhens (December 23, 1844 – January 15, 1928) was a land owner and entrepreneur in Königswinter, Germany. Mülhens was born in Cologne.

In the 19th century he managed the perfume factory founded by his grandfather Wilhelm Mülhens at Cologne's Glockengasse 4711, producing the original Eau de Cologne. As owner of the 4711 brand, he received an imperial warrant as purveyor to the imperial and royal court in Vienna.

During the years 1912 to 1914, he set up Hotel Petersberg near Bonn, which later become the Guest House of the Federal Government of Germany. Since 1913, he was the owner of the Drachenfelsbahn, a mountain railway line in the North Rhine-Westphalia region of Germany.

From 1922 until his death, Ferdinand Mülhens was an honorary citizen of Königswinter.

== Sources ==
- Karl Michael Armer et al.: Muelhens. Cologne-Paris-New York, the Culture of Beauty; Zweihundert Jahre 4711. DuMont, Köln 1992, ISBN 3770131215
- Eau-de-Cologne- und Parfümerie-Fabrik Glockengasse No. 4711 gegenüber der Pferdepost von Ferd. Mülhens. 160 Jahre 4711. 1792–1952. Köln 1952
- Wilhelm Treue: "Ferdinand Mülhens (1844–1928)". In: Kölner Unternehmer im 18., 19. und 20. Jahrhundert. (= Rheinisch-Westfälische Wirtschaftsbiographien, Band 12.) Aschendorff, Münster 1986, pp. 158–180
