= Siebengebirge =

German hill range

Seven Hills
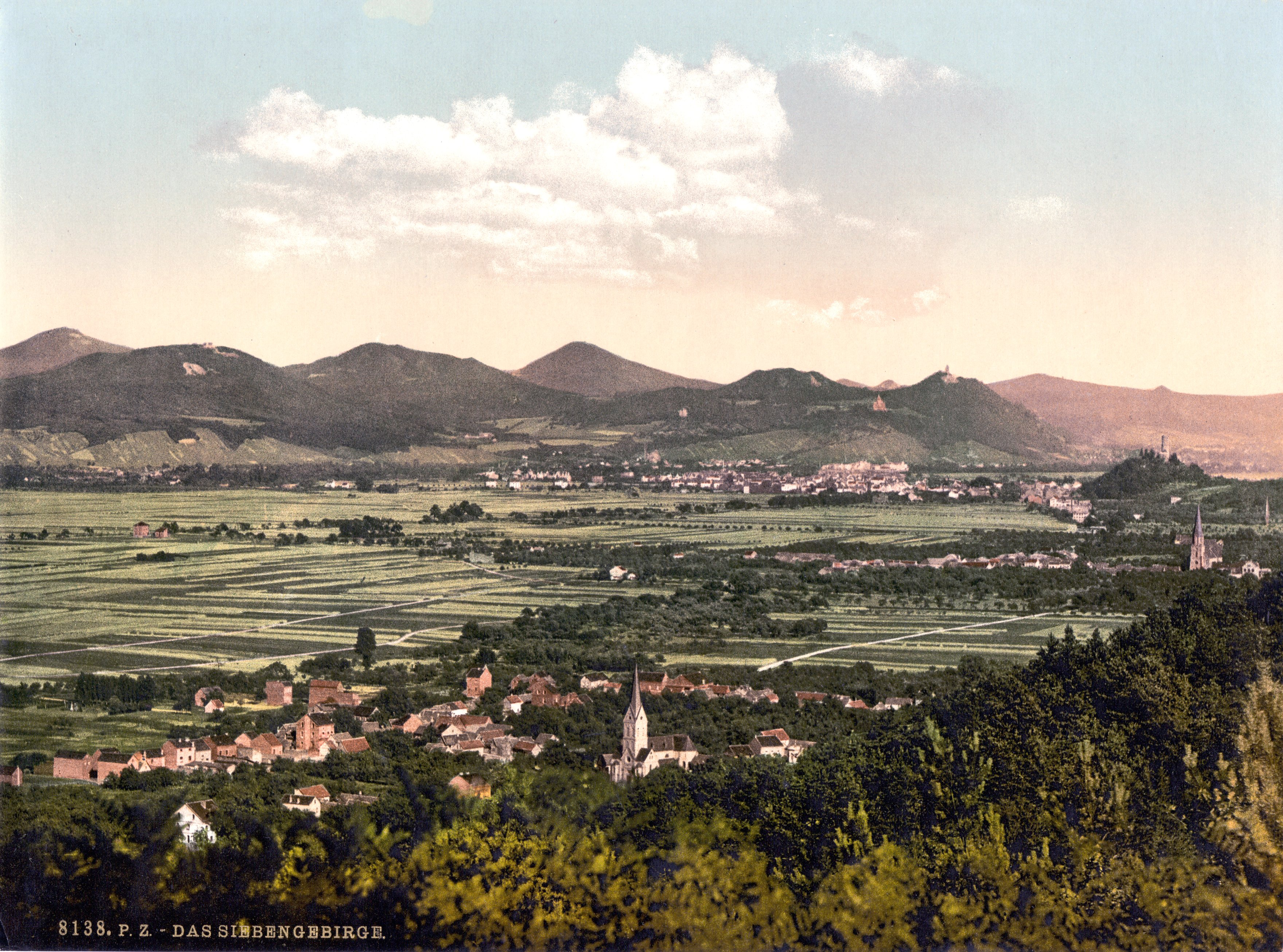
- Seven Hills, 1900

Highest point
- Peak: Großer Ölberg
- Elevation: 460 m (1,510 ft)
- Coordinates: 50°40′46″N 07°14′54″E

Naming
- Native name: Siebengebirge (German)

Geography
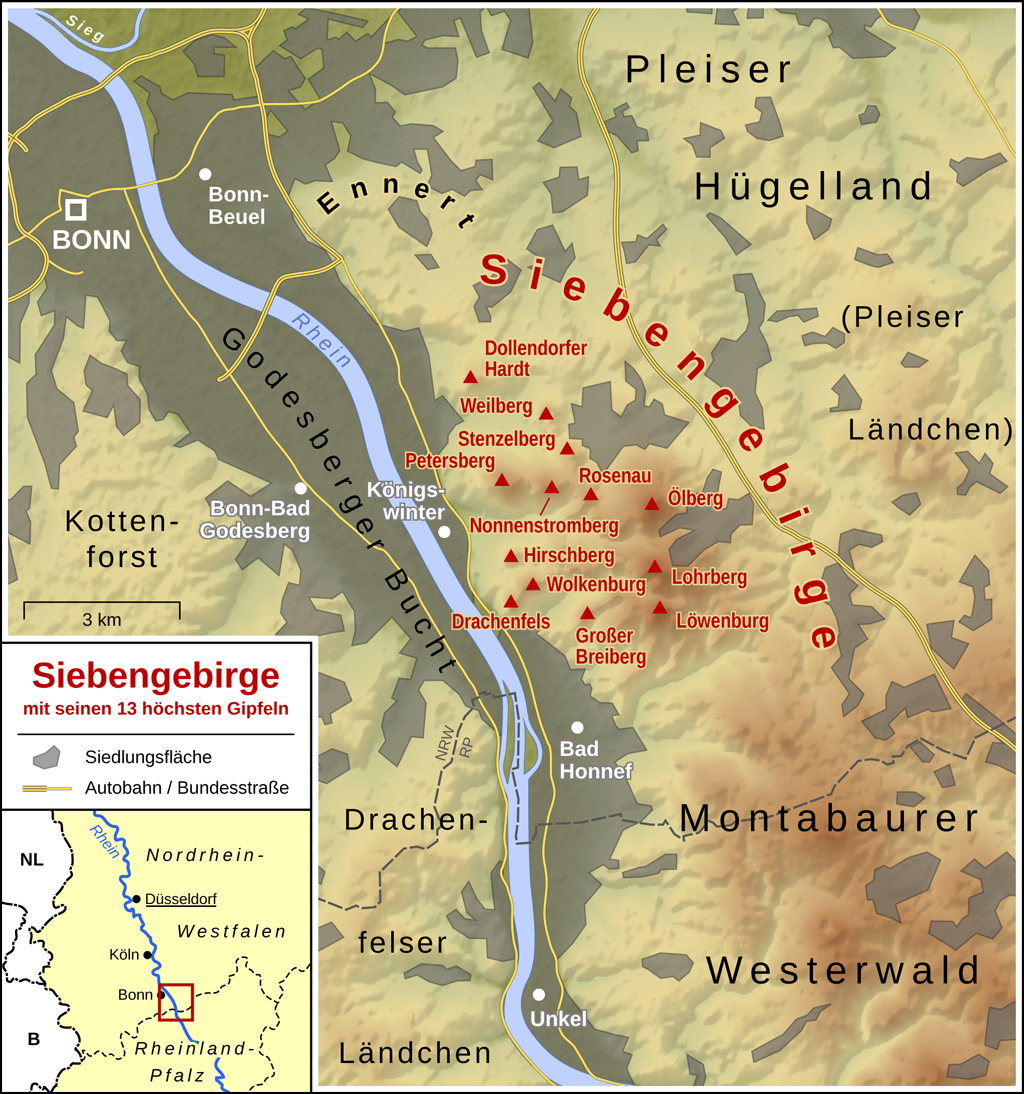
- Area map of Seven Hills
- Country: Germany
- Region(s): North Rhine-Westphalia and Rhineland-Palatinate

Geology
- Orogeny: European Cenozoic Rift System
- Rock age: Oligocene

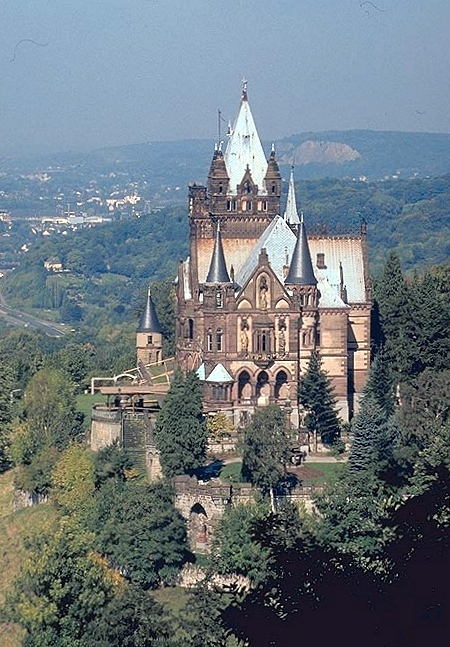
The castle Schloss Drachenburg is one of the landmarks of Seven Hills

The Siebengebirge (German pronunciation: [ˈziːbn̩ɡəˌbɪʁɡə]), occasionally Sieben Mountains or Seven Mountains, are a hill range of the German Central Uplands on the east bank of the Middle Rhine, southeast of Bonn.

== Description ==
The area, located in the municipalities of Bad Honnef and Königswinter, consists of more than 40 hills. The hills are of ancient volcanic origin and came into being between 28 and 15 million years ago. Much of the territory covered by Sieben Hills belongs to the Sieben Hills Nature Park (Naturpark Siebengebirge), which is under environmental protection.

The highest peak is the Ölberg at 460 metres above sea level. It is a popular tourist destination for hiking, because of its natural environment.

== Hills ==
The seven most important hills:

- Großer Ölberg (460 m)
- Löwenburg (455 m)
- Lohrberg (435 m)
- Nonnenstromberg (335m)
- Petersberg (331 m, Former name: Stromberg)
- Wolkenburg (324 m)
- Drachenfels (321 m)

Other hills:

- Himmerich (366 m)
- Trenkeberg (430 m)
- Weilberg (297 m)
- Stenzelberg (287 m)
- Broderkonsberg (378 m)
- Mittelberg (353 m)
- Leyberg (359 m)
- Jungfernhardt (320 m)
- Geisberg (324 m)
- Schallenberg (310 m)
- Großer Breiberg (313 m)
- Kleiner Breiberg (288 m)
- Wasserfall (338 m)
- Kleiner Ölberg (332 m)
- Limperichsberg
- Scharfenberg
- Zickelburg (182 m)

== Origin name ==
Although some sources translate the name literally as Seven Hills, where sieben is modern German for "seven" and a Gebirge is a hill range, alternative derivations for the name have been suggested. Three theories exist:

1. The oldest name was not Siebengebirge, but Sieben Berge (septem montes, seven hills). Depending on the viewpoint near the river Rhine, one notices almost exactly seven hills, which are not always the same and not even the highest. Also, the number seven used to denote an arbitrary amount of items, was connected to magic and thus had a highly symbolic meaning. This makes it an obvious name for an area that was said to be sinister and impenetrable before the 19th century.
2. The word sieben is derived from the word siefen which, in turn comes from the Middle Low German word sîpe "wet depression" or "little stream, brook", the verb sîpen means "trickle, drip".
3. The name Siebengebirge emerged from the word Siedengebirge which indicated the presence of soap boilers ("Seifensieder"), who were banned from the valleys because boiling soap smelled so bad.
