= Drachenfels (Siebengebirge) =

Hill in Germany

Coordinates: 50°39′55″N 7°12′35″E

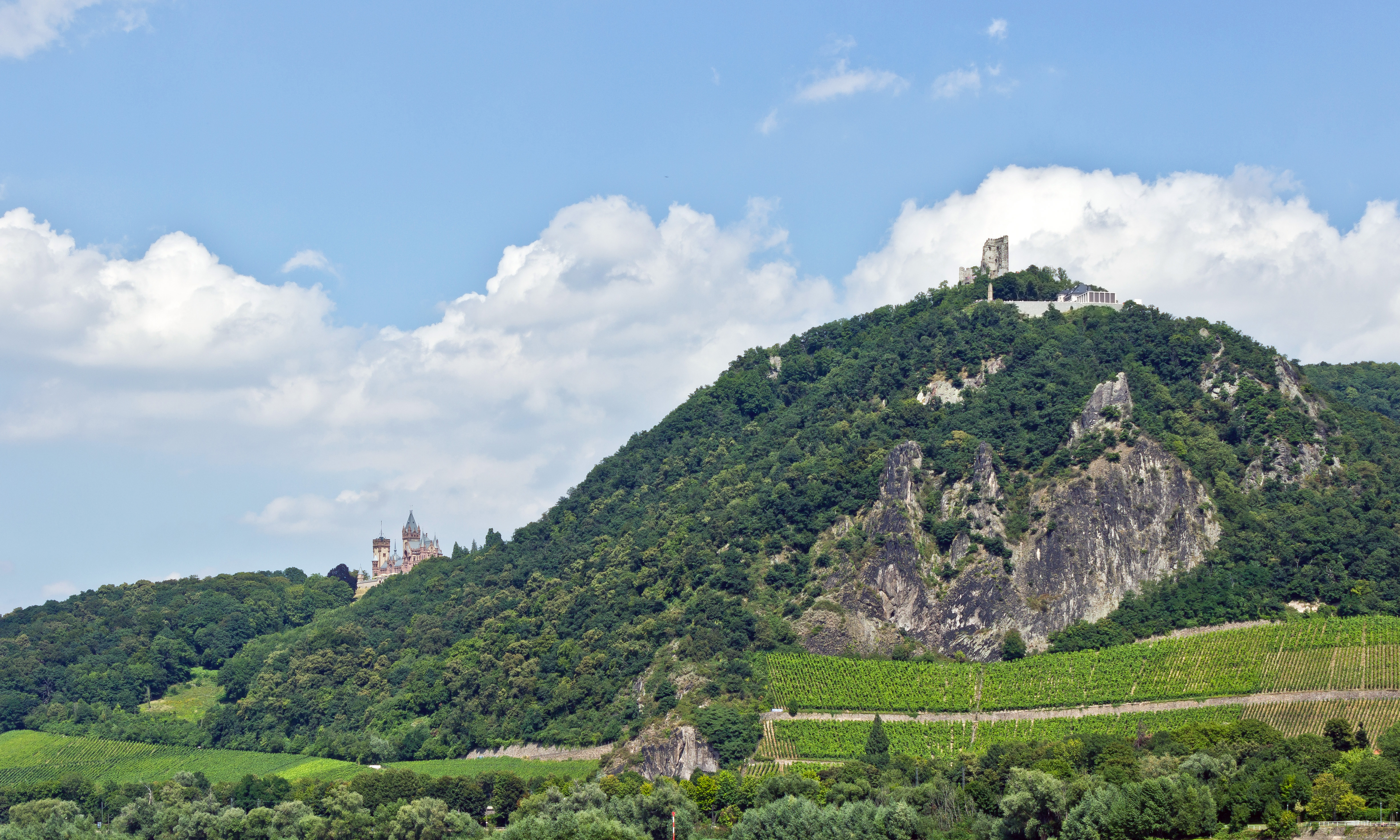
Drachenfels, view from Mehlem

The Drachenfels ("Dragon's Rock", German pronunciation: [ˈdʁaxənˌfɛls]) is a hill (321 metres (1,053 ft)) in the Siebengebirge uplands between Königswinter and Bad Honnef in Germany. The hill was formed by rising magma that could not break through to the surface, and then cooled and became solid underneath. It is the subject of much tourism and romanticism in the North Rhine-Westphalia area.

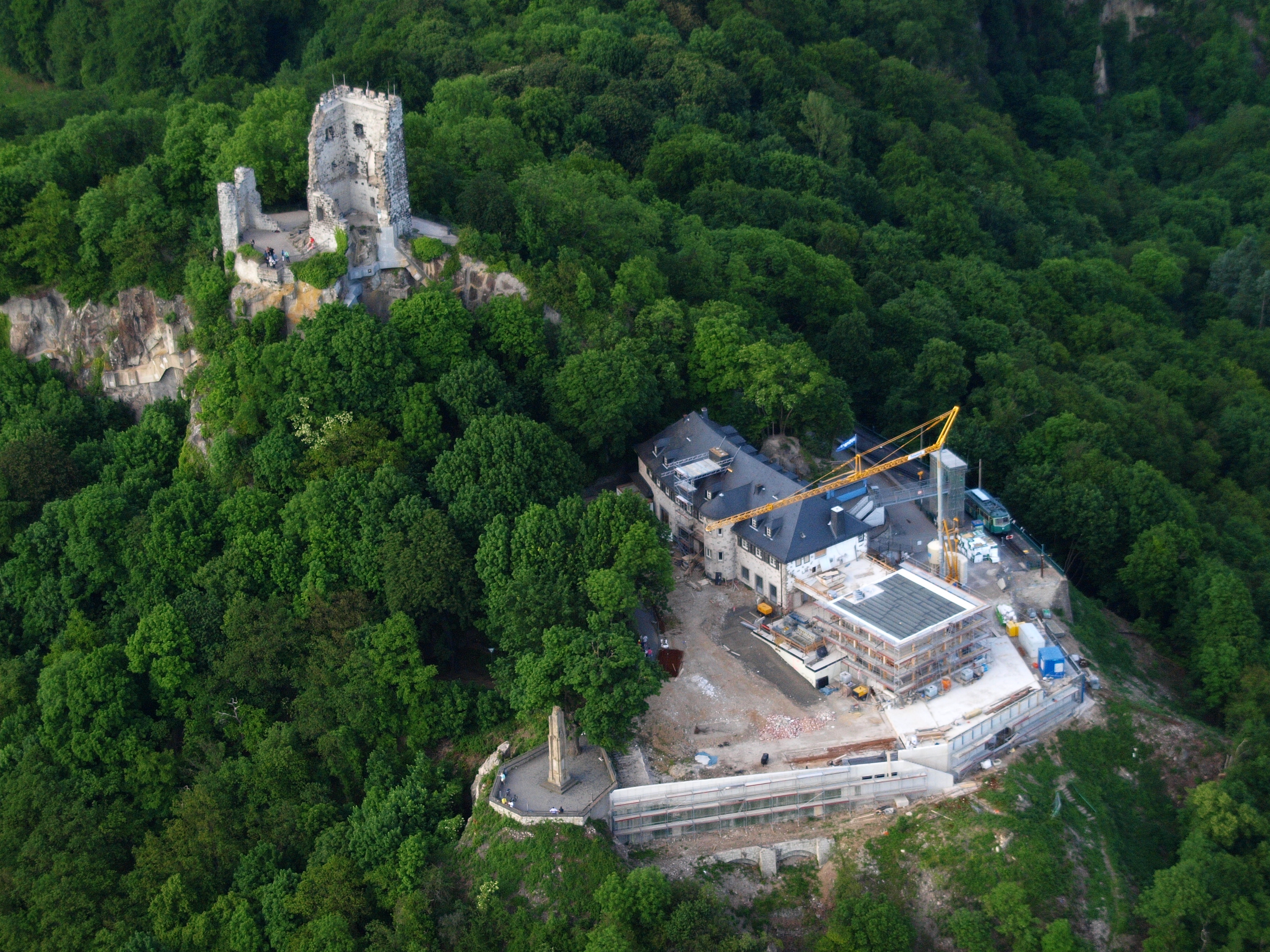
Drachenfels – aerial view

== History ==
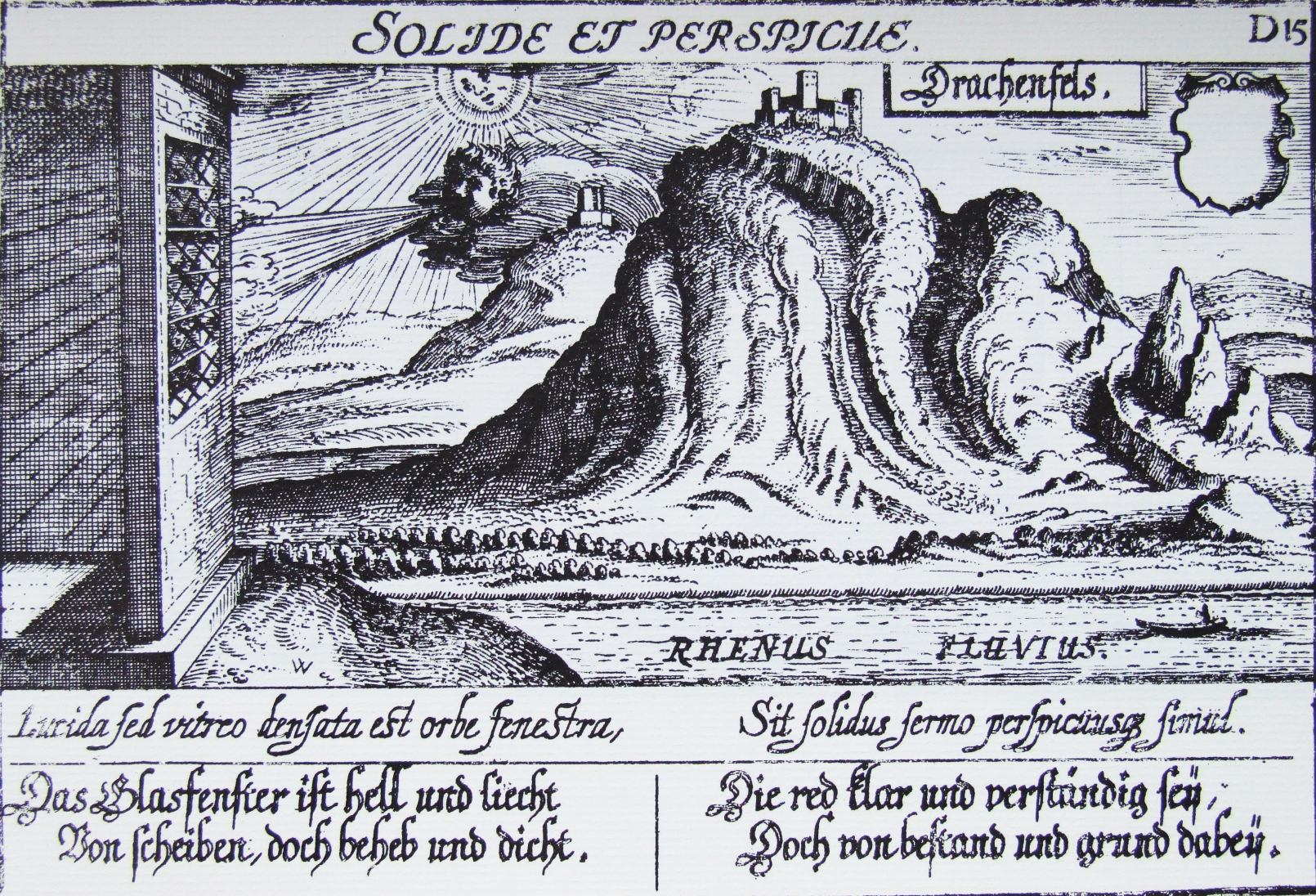
The Drachenfels in 1624 by Matthäus Merian. The slide used to transport the rock from the quarry to the Rhine is shown, as is the (now disappeared) Burg Wolkenburg and an intact Burgfried. The engraving is an advertisement for glass windows.

The ruined castle Burg Drachenfels, on the summit of the hill, was built between 1138 and 1167 by Archbishop Arnold I of Cologne and bears the same name. It was originally intended for the protection of the Cologne region from any assault from the south. Originally it consisted of a bergfried with court, chapel and living quarters for servants. The castle was slighted in 1634, during the Thirty Years' War, by the Protestant Swedes and never rebuilt. As a strategic asset it had outlived its usefulness. Erosion due to the continued quarrying undermined much of the remains and only a small part is left today.

The rock, like the rest of the Siebengebirge, is formed by the remnants of a volcano and has been the site of a trachyte quarry since Roman times, which, amongst others, delivered the building material for the Cologne Cathedral. Of all the hills in the Siebengebirge, it is closest to the river Rhine, which facilitates easy transport by barges, thus making it an excellent place for a quarry. Quarrying ended in 1836, when the Prussian government bought the quarry. In 1922 the first protection measures were put in place and in 1956 the site was declared a national park.

== Tourism ==
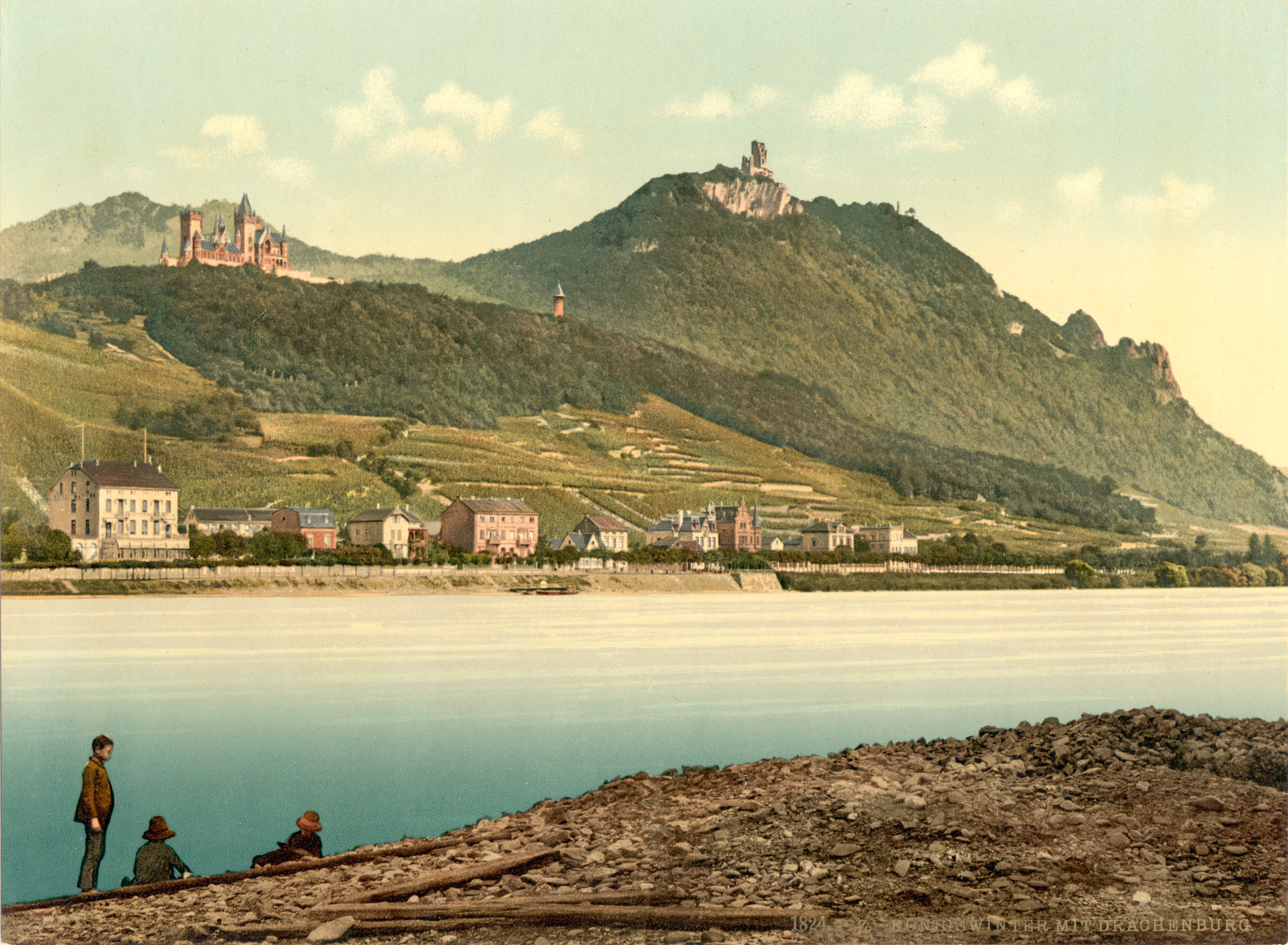
Königswinter and the Drachenfels. Postcard in Photochrom, around 1900

The rock and the ruins gained popularity in the romantic era, after the Napoleonic Wars had ended. The visit of Lord Byron to Mehlem and its appearance in Childe Harold's Pilgrimage provided the rock with international attention. It soon became a highlight of the so-called Rhine romanticism. Poems were composed by people including Edward Bulwer-Lytton and locally by Heinrich Heine. Thus popularized, and, since 1883, accessible by rail it evolved into a tourist attraction, which it still is.

A neogothic castle, lower on the hill, is named Schloss Drachenburg and was built in 1882 by Baron Stephan von Sarter. Both the top and Schloss Drachenburg can be reached by the Drachenfelsbahn, a rack railway built in the 19th century to satisfy demand from growing tourism. The Drachenfels is sometimes irreverently called Schwiegermutterfelsen (mother-in-law rock) or jokingly referred to as "the highest hill in Holland" because of its popularity among Dutch tourists. It is the first substantial elevation one encounters when traveling upstream on the Rhine from the Netherlands.

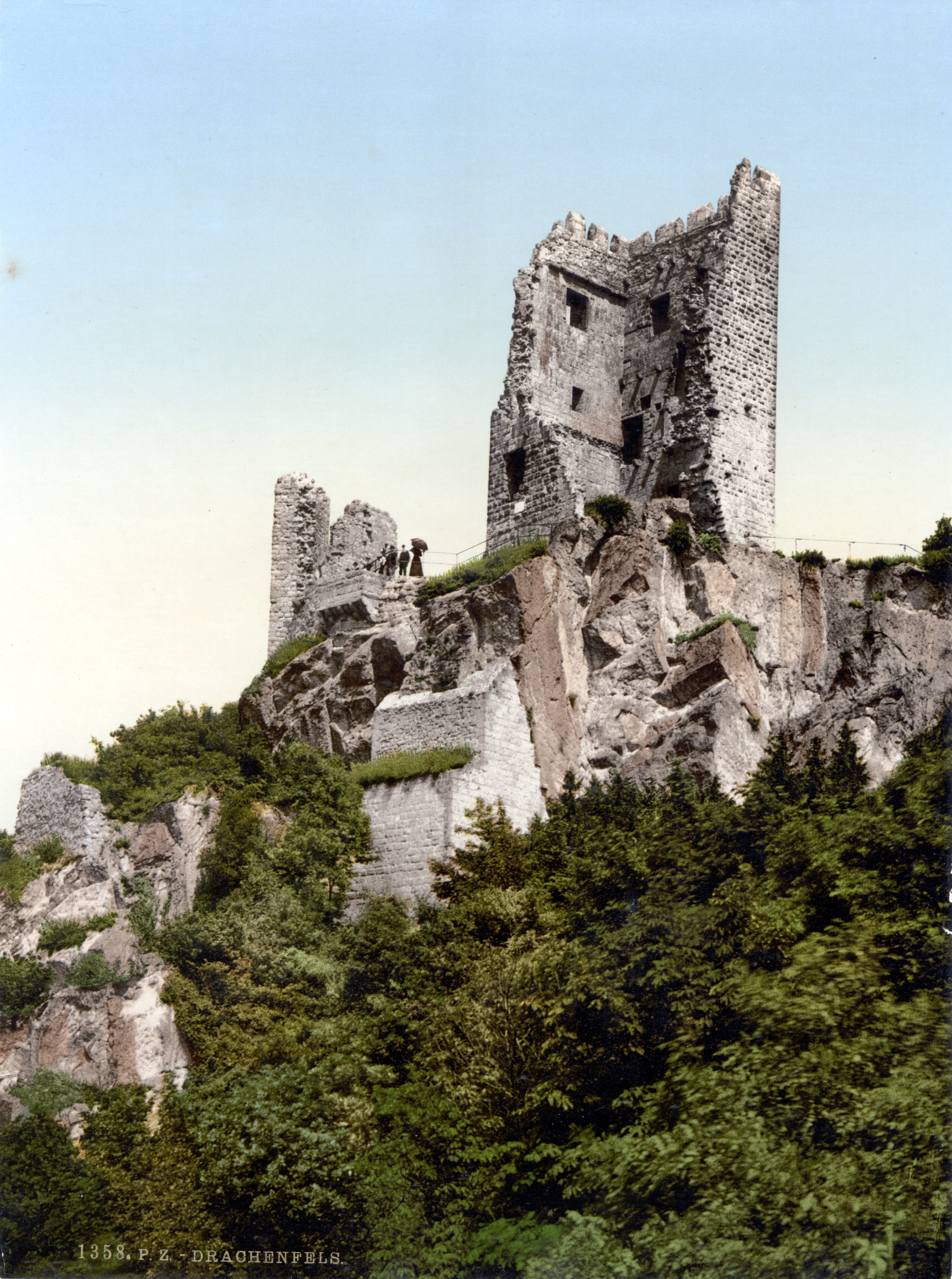
The ruins of Burg Drachenfels, around 1900

The castled crag of Drachenfels
Frowns o’er the wide and winding Rhine.
Whose breast of waters broadly swells
Between the banks which bear the vine,
And hills all rich with blossomed trees,
And fields which promise corn and wine,
And scattered cities crowning these,
Whose far white walls along them shine,
Have strewed a scene, which I should see
With double joy wert thou with me!

— Lord Byron, Childe Harold's Pilgrimage

In the 1970s a new restaurant (with view) was built on top of the hill in the then popular brutalistic style. In January 2011 work began to demolish it, renovate the buildings from the 1930s and replace the restaurant with a glass cube. The new restaurant was opened November 30, 2012, the outside facilities were finished June 2, 2013.

== Legends ==
Several legends surround the Drachenfels, most famously that Siegfried – the hero of the Nibelungenlied – killed the dragon Fafnir, who lived in a cave in the hill, then bathed in its blood to become invulnerable. Hence, the hill is named the "Dragon's Rock", Drachenfels.

About a third of the way up is the Nibelungenhalle, built in 1913, a gallery of paintings by the symbolist painter Hermann Hendrich depicting scenes from Richard Wagner's operas.

Another legend tells of prisoners being sacrificed to a dragon. One of these was a Christian virgin, who, in her fear, held up a little cross. In fear of this holy symbol, the dragon jumped into the Rhine and was never heard from again.

A third story has it the dragon one day attacked a boat laden with gunpowder, causing an explosion which destroyed the ship and killed the dragon.

== Viticulture ==
Next to Oberdollendorf, some 10 km downstream, the Drachenfels is the most northerly slope used for viticulture along the Rhine. Riesling dominates, but in smaller quantities also Gewürztraminer, Scheurebe, Dornfelder, Kerner, Grau-, Weiss- and Spätburgunder are cultivated. The slopes are maintained and harvested by hand, since they are too steep for machinery.

== See also ==
- List of mountains and hills in North Rhine-Westphalia

== Sources ==
- This article is a condensed version of the German article.
