= Schloss Drachenburg =

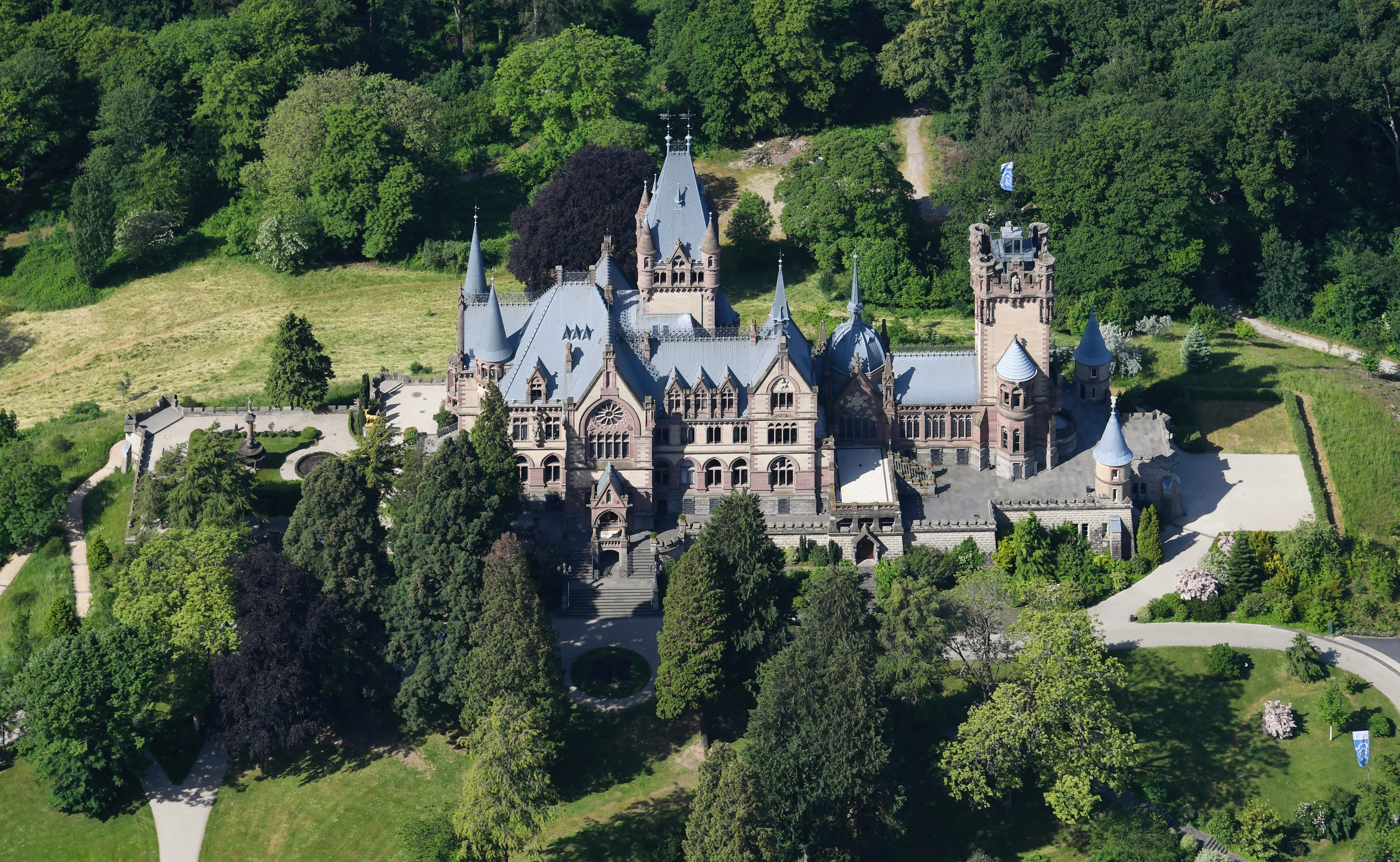
- Schloss Drachenburg

- Location within North Rhine-Westphalia Location within Germany
- 50°40′07″N 7°12′23″E
- Type: Villa
- Location: Königswinter

History
- Built: 1882–1884

Site notes
- Area: North Rhine-Westphalia
- Architects: Bernhard Tüshaus; Leo von Abbema; Wilhelm Hoffman
- Owner: North Rhine-Westphalia Foundation

Schloss Drachenburg or Drachenburg Castle is a private villa styled as a palace and constructed in the late 19th century. It was completed in only two years (1882–84) on the Drachenfels hill in Königswinter, a German town on the east bank of the Rhine, south of the city of Bonn. Baron Stephan von Sarter (1833–1902), a broker and banker, planned to live there, but never did.

The villa is owned by the State Foundation of North Rhine-Westphalia. It is served by an intermediate station on the Drachenfels Railway.

== History ==
Stephan Sarter was born in Bonn and, after leaving school, was apprenticed to the Leopold Seligman bank in Köln. He transferred to the Salomon Openheim bank, ending up as a market analyst in their Paris branch. Trading on his own account, he amassed a fortune and applied for a patent of nobility in 1881. He continued to live in Paris for the rest of his life, but commissioned the schloss as a fitting background for a German baron.

The initial plans for the building were drawn up by the Düsseldorf architects, Bernhard Tüshaus and Leo von Abbema with construction commencing in 1882. Sarter appears to have had a falling out with the original architects and brought in the Paris-based architect, Wilhelm Hoffman, to complete the work.

Sarter died a bachelor in 1902 and his estate, including the schloss, was divided amongst a number of his relatives. One of his nephews, Jacob Hubert Biesenbach, a Bonn lawyer, realised the potential of the building as a tourist attraction and bought out the other legatees for 390,000 Marks. Though moderately successful, income failed to cover costs and in 1910 Biesenbach sold the castle to Egbert von Simon who ran it successfully. Von Simon, a cavalry officer, was killed in battle at Arras during the First World War.

The castle and estate was acquired piecemeal at various auctions by the businessman and arms dealer Hermann Flohr, who lived in part of the building while the rest was used as a women's convalescent home. In 1930 the castle was sold to the Catholic order of De La Salle Brothers who established St Michael's boarding school there. In the late 1930s, the school came in increasing conflict with the Nazi Party and closed in 1938. In 1940 it was sold to the German Labour Front who established the Adolf Hitler school there.

Post-war, the castle became the property of the State of North-Rhine, Westphalia, who rented it out to the Federal Railways as a training facility until they moved to dedicated premises in Wuppertal in 1959. Subsequently, the castle was left empty and began to deteriorate.

=== Restoration ===
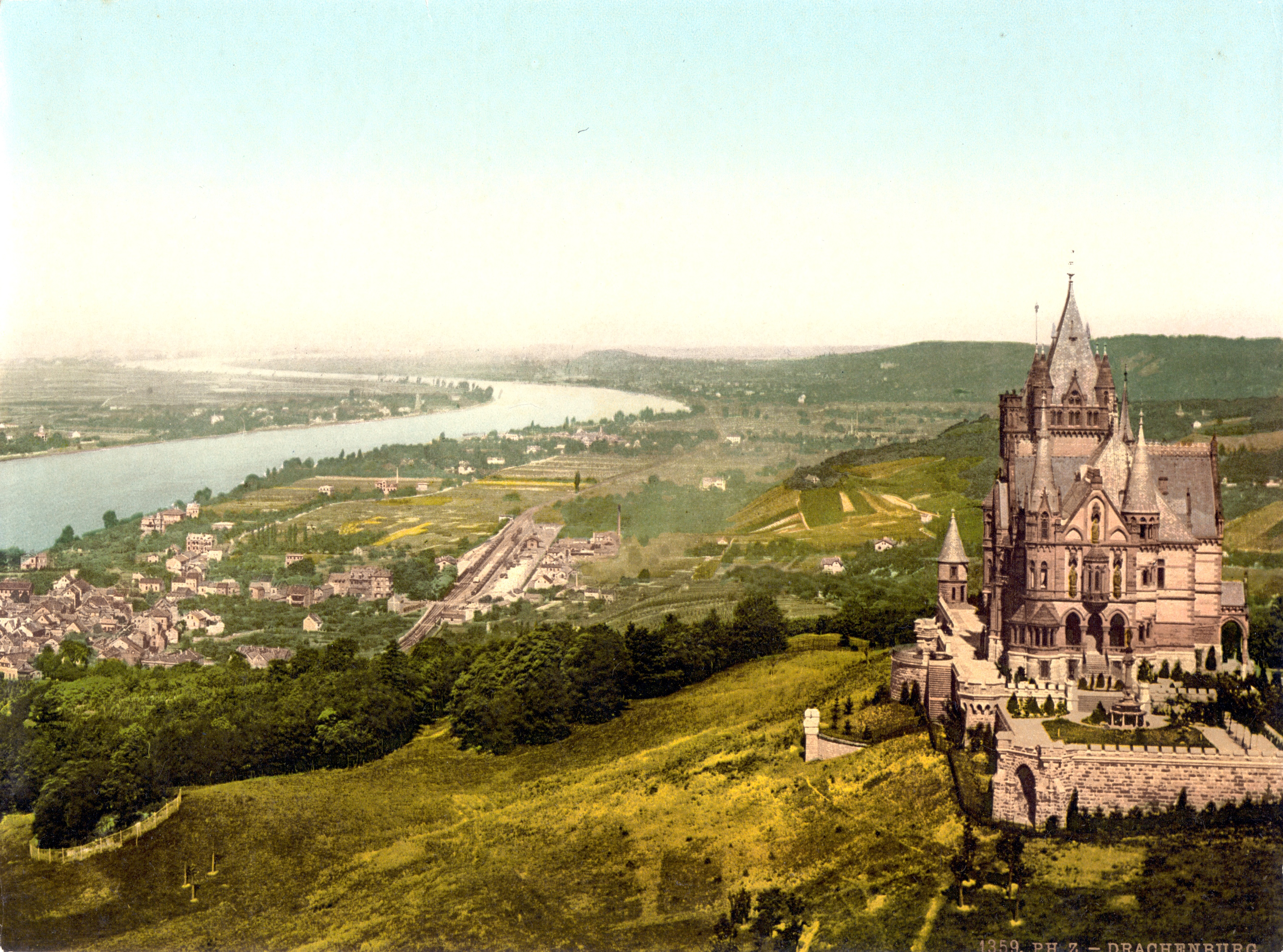
Schloss Drachenburg in 1900

In 1963, a Syndicate for the Preservation of Drachenburg was founded which succeeded in getting the castle classified as worth preserving. It was purchased, in 1971, by a local textile merchant, Paul Spinat, who carried out major restorations and used it for entertaining and also opened for visitors. He died in debt in 1989 and the State of North Rhine-Westphalia took over the estate and carried out a further series of restoration works stretching over 20 years. The restoration was greatly helped by the existence of a number of postcards and other illustrations commissioned by Jacob Biesenbach for his original tourism project at the beginning of the 20th century. The building is now administered by the North Rhine-Westphalia Foundation.

== In popular culture ==
The castle was used in the German TV-series Babylon Berlin as the home of Alfred Nyssen.

The castle served as the inspiration for Schloss Drache in the James Bond Novel Never Send Flowers by John Gardner.

== Gallery ==
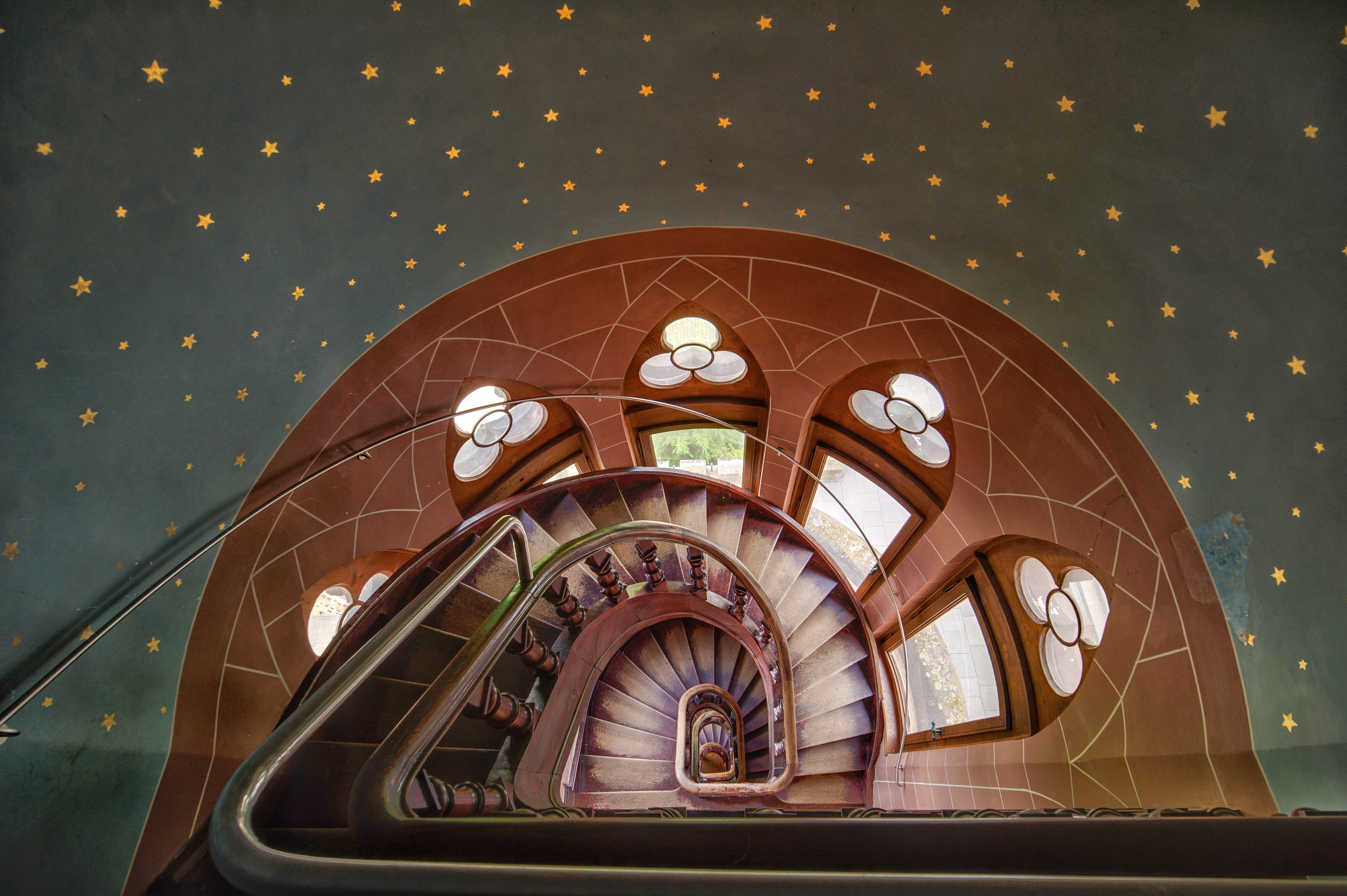
Staircase in Schloss Drachenburg

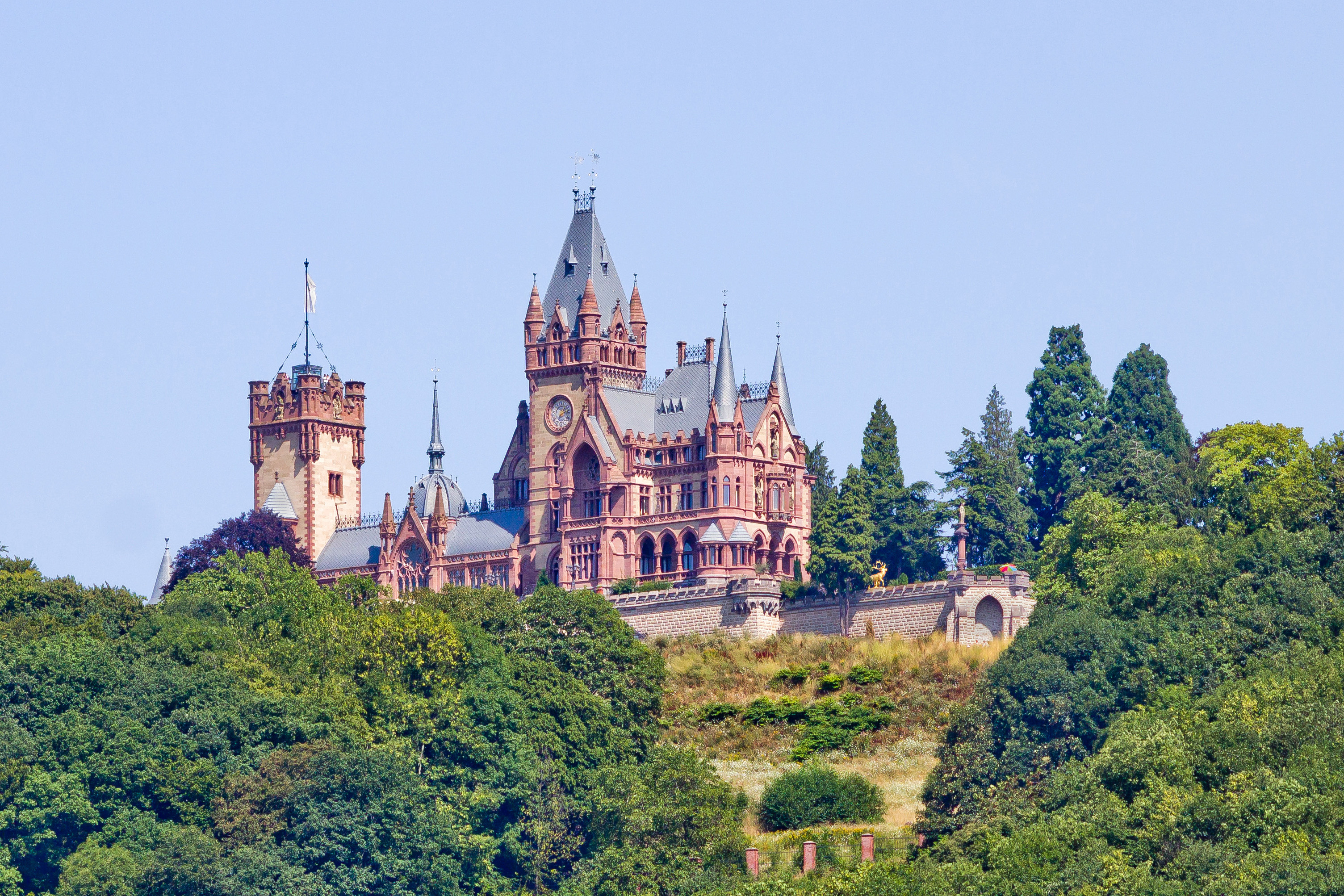
View from below (Bonn-Mehlem)

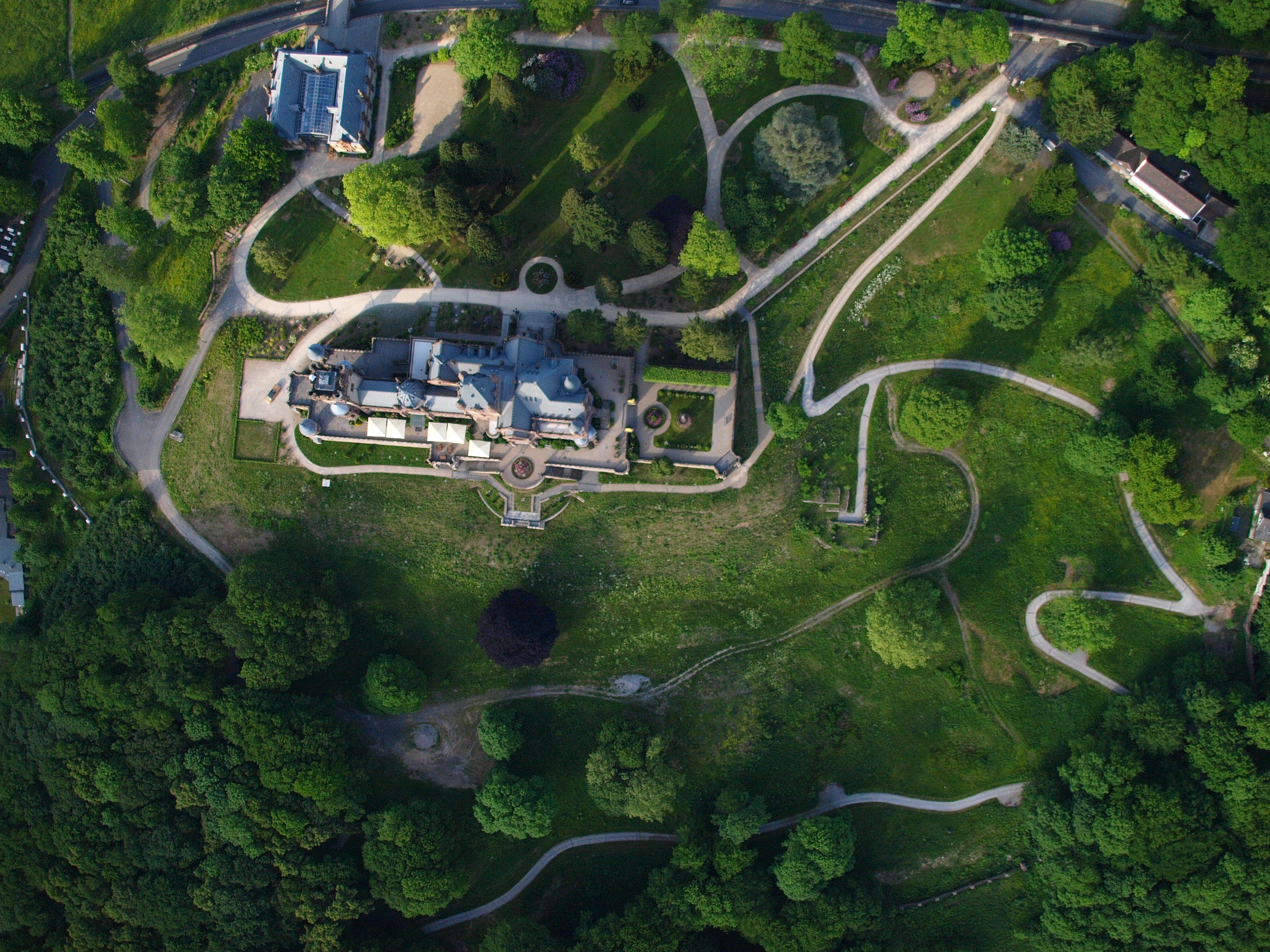
Schloss Drachenburg from above

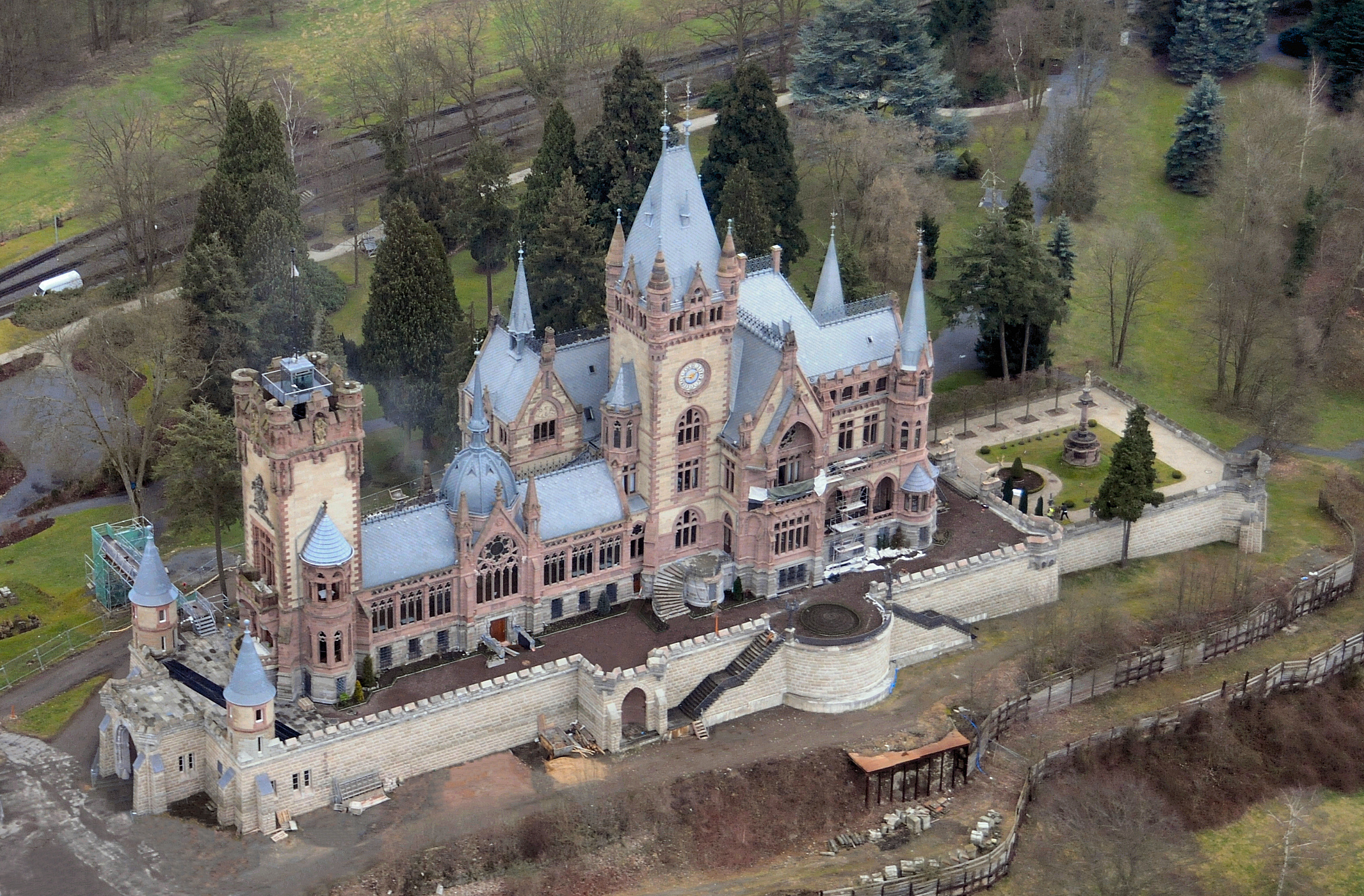

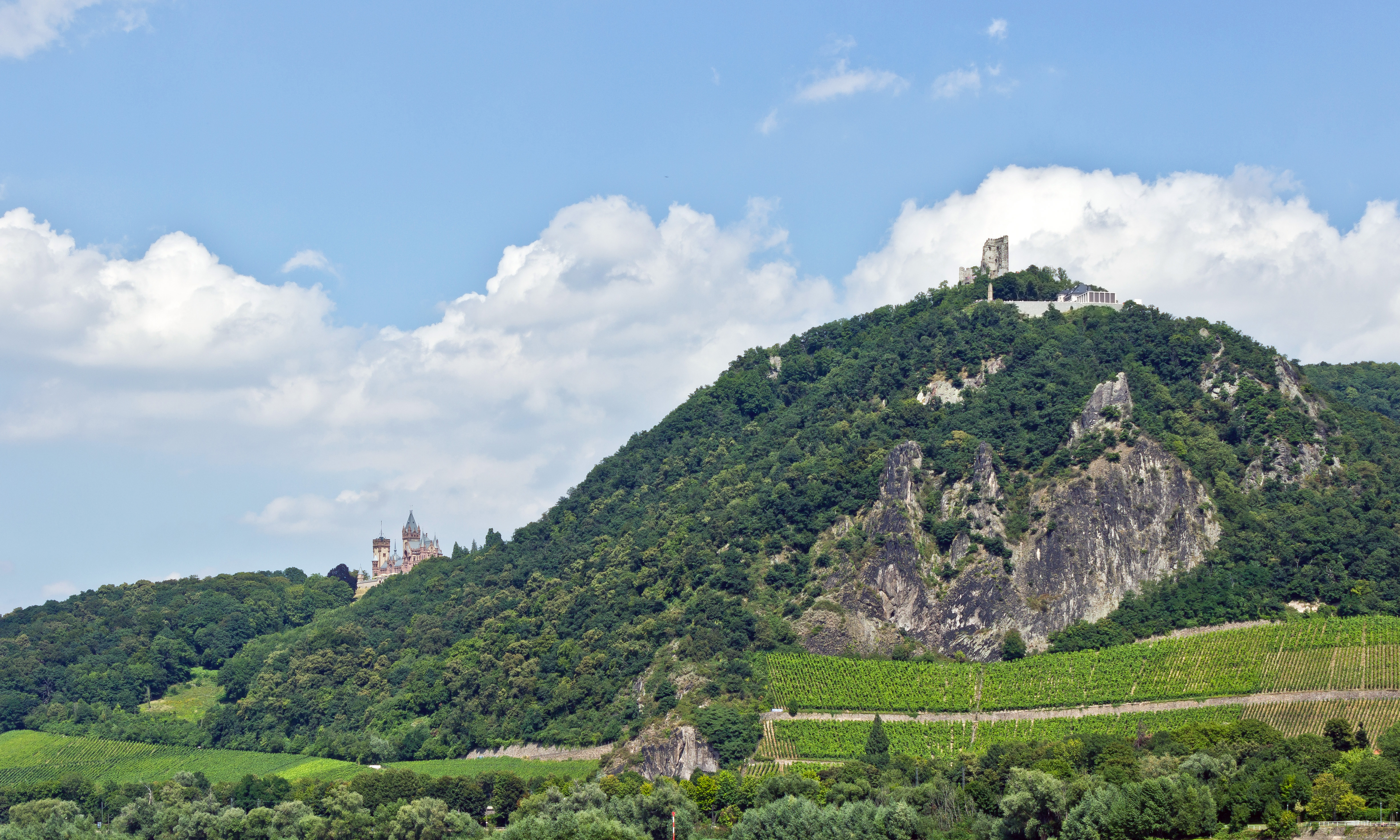
Schloss Drachenburg (left) and the Drachenfels ruin (right) on the Drachenfels mountain
