= Staatliche Lehr- und Versuchsanstalt für Wein- und Obstbau Weinsberg =

State Education and Research Institute for Viticulture and Pomology Weinsberg
- Staatliche Lehr- und Versuchsanstalt für Wein- und Obstbau Weinsberg
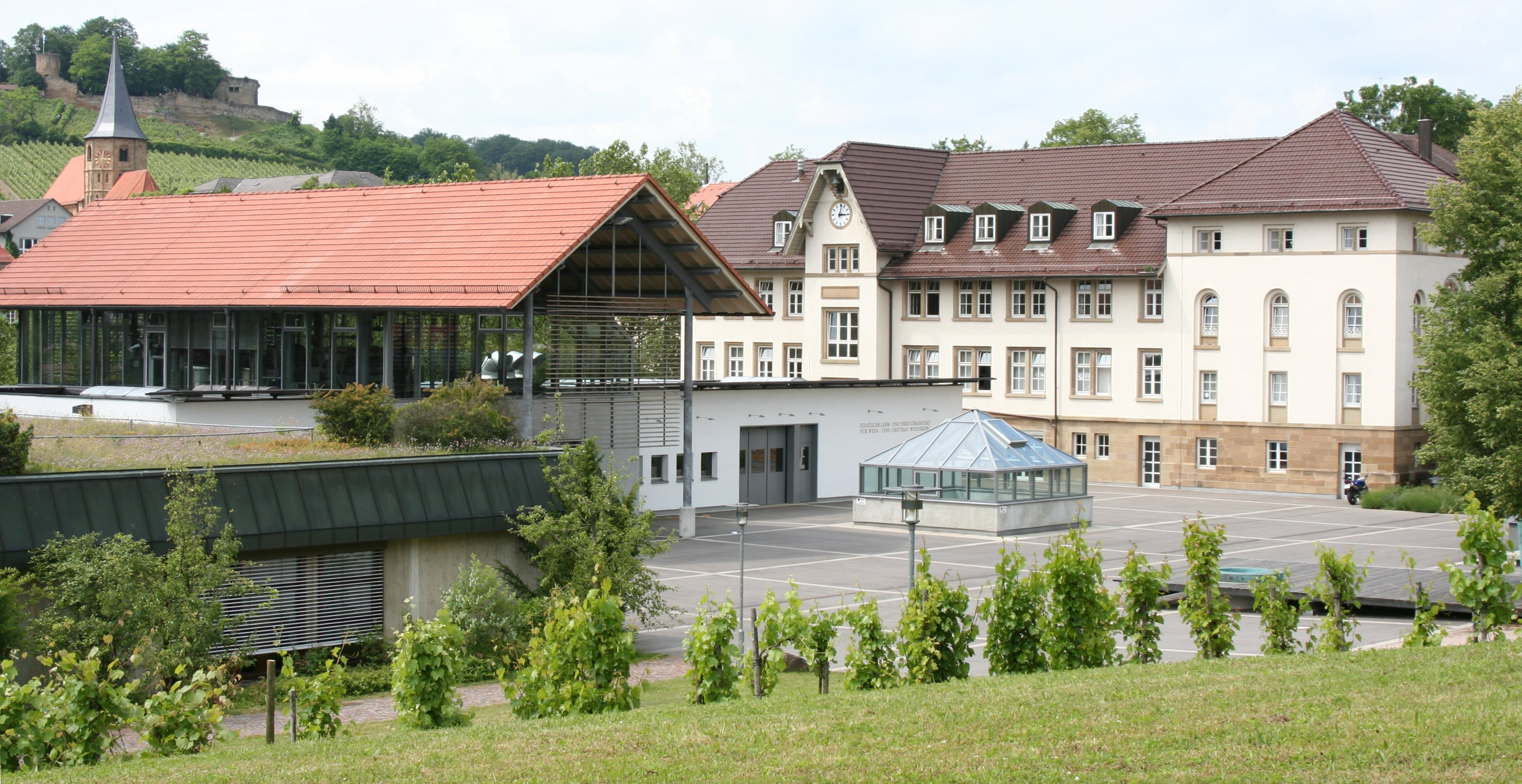
- Weinsberg in June 2005

Location
- Weinsberg, Baden-Württemberg; Germany
- Coordinates: 49°9′4″N 9°17′21″E

Information
- Funding type: Public
- Founded: 1868
- Founder: Immanuel Dornfeld
- Enrollment: about 60 (2015)
- Campus type: vineyard
- Website: www.lvwo-weinsberg.de

Staatliche Lehr- und Versuchsanstalt für Wein- und Obstbau Weinsberg (English: State Education and Research Institute for Viticulture and Pomology Weinsberg) (LVWO) is a training and research institute for wine and fruit growing located in the town of Weinsberg in Heilbronn district, Baden-Württemberg, Germany.

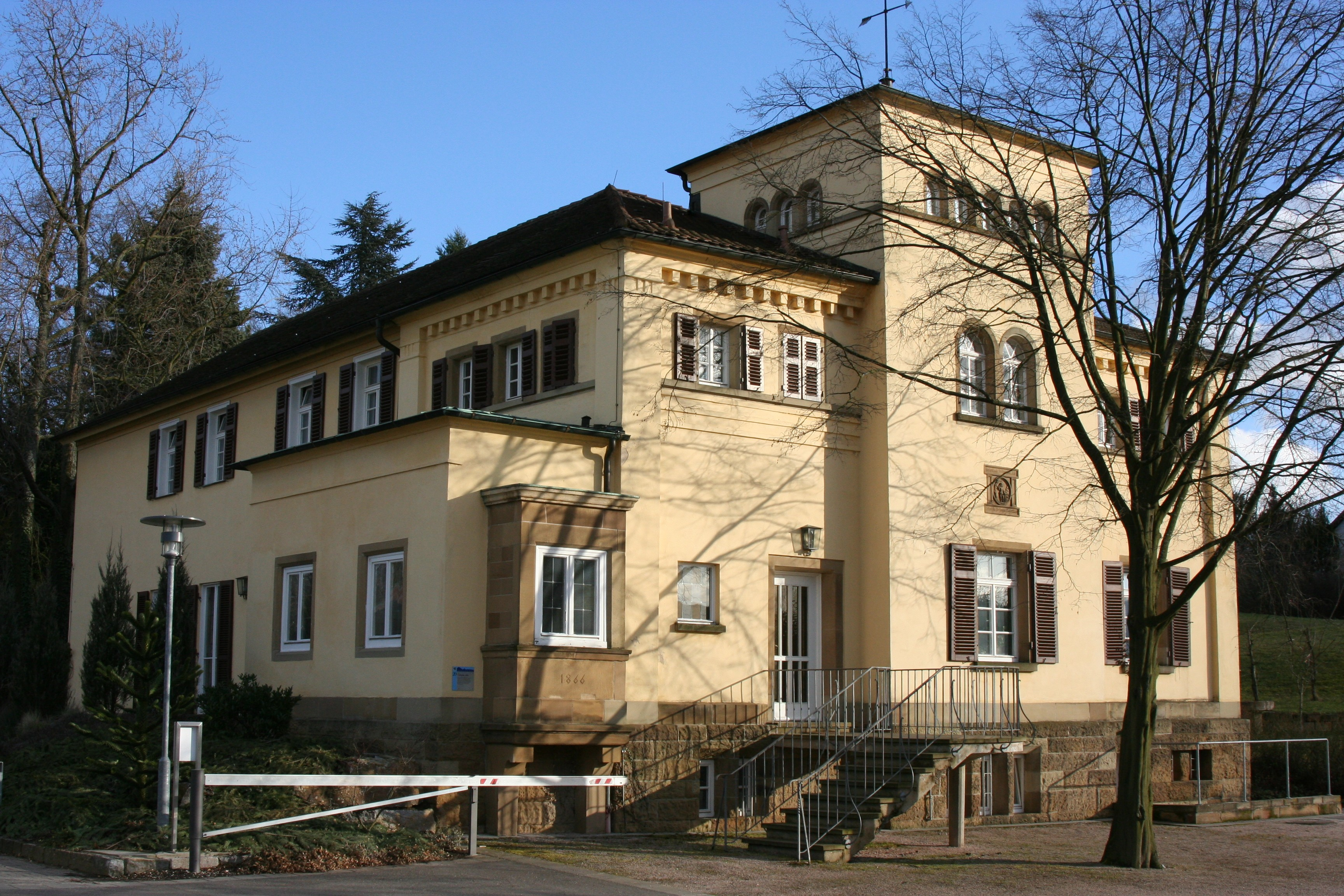
The Hildt villa on the school premises

Founded as Königliche Weinbauschule (Royal School of Viticulture Institute) in 1868, it is the oldest German wine and fruit growing school. The founder was Immanuel Dornfeld. It was given its name on 4 November 1952.

In 1901 LVWO established a laboratory for wine and fruit growing that in 1924 joined the educational institution. The institution manages diverse fruits and vineyard goods.

Vine breeding began in 1907 at the Württemberg Institute for Grapevine Breeding and Grafting in Offenau (from 1926 with an office in Lauffen am Neckar). The Grapevine Breeding Institute was connected in 1947 to LVWO. August Herold produced several grape varieties, including Helfensteiner, Heroldrebe (named after him), Dornfelder (named for the school's founder) and Kerner.

The Istituto Agrario di San Michele all’Adige in San Michele all'Adige, Italy is a partner of LVWO. The wines and sparkling wines produced by the wine school are, since 1995, marketed under the name Staatsweingut Weinsberg. On 1 January 2005 the LVWO was converted into a state company. Since 2008, eight months' training and auditing for wine experience guides will take place here.

Since 1971 the state winery is a member of the Association of German Prädikat Wine Estates. The approximately 40 hectares (99 acres) of vineyards are planted 20% with Riesling, 14% with Lemberger and Pinot varieties, 9% with Trollinger and 43% with other varieties. The principal vineyards are at Wildeck Castle in Abstatt, Himmelreich in Gundelsheim and Schemelsberg. Around 250,000 bottles are filled annually.

== Literature ==
- Festschrift 1868–1968. Staatl. Lehr- und Versuchsanstalt für Wein- und Obstbau, Weinsberg 1968
- Festschrift 1868–1993: 125 Jahre Staatliche Lehr- und Versuchsanstalt für Wein- und Obstbau Weinsberg. Staatl. Lehr- und Versuchsanstalt für Wein- und Obstbau, Weinsberg 1993
