= List of German wine regions =

Germany's 13 regions for quality wine

German wine regions are classified according to the quality category of the wine grown therein: Tafelwein, Landwein, Qualitätswein bestimmter Anbaugebiete (QbA) and Prädikatswein. The wine regions allowed to produce QbA and Prädikatswein are further subdivided into four categories according to size: Anbaugebiet (a major wine region), Bereich (a district within the wine region), Großlage (a collection of vineyards within a district) and Einzellage (a single vineyard). A small number of Einzellagen do not belong to a Großlage and are called "großlagenfrei", but all belong to a Bereich and Anbaugebiet.

The 13 major wine regions (Anbaugebiete) are Ahr, Baden, Franconia, Hessische Bergstraße, Mittelrhein, Mosel, Nahe, Palatinate, Rheingau, Rheinhessen, Saale-Unstrut, Saxony, and Württemberg. With the exceptions of Saxony and Saale-Unstrut, most of Germany's major wine regions are located in the western part of the country. As of 2010, there were 41 Bereiche, 160 Großlagen and 2,632 Einzellagen.

== Ahr ==
In the Ahr there is one Bereich (in bold) and one Großlage.

Walporzheim/Ahrtal

- Klosterberg

== Baden ==
In the Baden there are nine Bereiche (in bold) and 16 Großlagen.

Badische Bergstraße

- Hohenberg
- Mannaberg
- Rittersberg
- Stiftsberg

Bodensee

- Sonnenufer

Breisgau

- Burg Lichteneck
- Burg Zähringen
- Schutterlindenberg

Kaiserstuhl

- Vulkanfelsen

Kraichgau
Markgräflerland

- Attilafelsen
- Burg Neuenfels
- Lorettoberg
- Vogtei Rötteln

Ortenau

- Fürsteneck
- Schloss Rodeck

Tauberfranken

- Tauberklinge

Tuniberg

== Franconia ==
In Franconia, also known as Franken, there are 3 Bereiche (in bold) and 22 Großlagen. 2 Einzellagen are großlagenfrei.

Maindreieck

- Burg
- Engelsberg
- Ewig Leben
- Hofrat
- Honigberg
- Kirchberg
- Marienberg
- Markgraf Babenberg
- Oelspiel
- Ravensburg
- Rosstal
- Teufelstor

Mainviereck

- Heiligenthal
- Reuschberg

Steigerwald

- Burgweg-Franken
- Herrenberg
- Kapellenberg
- Schild
- Schlossberg
- Schlossstück

== Hessische Bergstraße ==
In the Hessische Bergstraße there are 2 Bereiche (in bold) and 3 Großlagen.

Starkenburg

- Rott
- Schlossberg
- Wolfsmagen

Umstadt

== Mittelrhein ==
In the Mittelrhein there are 2 Bereiche (in bold) and 12 Großlagen.

Loreley

- Burg Hammerstein
- Burg Rheinfels
- Gedeonseck
- Schloss Herrenberg
- Lahntal
- Loreleyfelsen
- Marksburg
- Schloss Reichenstein
- Schloss Schönburg
- Schloss Stahleck

Siebengebirge

- Petersberg

== Mosel ==
In the Mosel there are six Bereiche (in bold) and 19 Großlagen.

Bernkastel

- Badstube
- Kurfürstlay
- Michelsberg
- Münzlay
- Nacktarsch
- Probstberg
- St. Michael
- Schwarzlay
- Vom Heißen Stein

Burg Cochem

- Goldbäumchen
- Gradschaft
- Rosenhang
- Schwarze Katz
- Weinhex

Moseltor

- Schloss Bübinger

Obermosel

- Gipfel
- Königsberg

Ruwertal

- Römerlay

Saar

- Scharzberg

== Nahe ==
In the Nahe there is one Bereich (in bold) and seven Großlagen.

Nahetal

- Burgweg-Nahe
- Kronenberg
- Paradiesgarten
- Pfarrgarten
- Rosengarten
- Schlosskapelle
- Sonnenborn

== Palatinate ==
In the Palatinate, also known as Pfalz, there are two Bereiche (in bold) and 25 Großlagen.

Mittelhaardt-Deutsche Weinstraße

- Feuerberg
- Gradenstück
- Hochmess
- Hofstück
- Höllenpfad
- Honigsäckel
- Kobnert
- Mariengarten
- Meerspinne
- Pfaffengrund
- Rebstöckel
- Rosenbühl
- Schenkenböhl
- Schnepfenflug an der Weinstraße
- Schnepfenflug vom Zellertal
- Schwarzerde

Südliche Weinstraße

- Bischofskreuz
- Guttenberg
- Herrlich
- Kloster Liebrauenberg
- Königsgarten
- Mandelhöhe
- Ordensgut
- Schloss Ludwigshöhe
- Trappenberg

== Rheingau ==
In the Rheingau there is one Bereich (in bold) and 10 Großlagen.

Johannisberg

- Burgweg-Rheingau
- Daubhaus
- Deutelsberg
- Erntebringer
- Gottesthal
- Heiligenstock
- Honigberg
- Mehrhölzchen
- Steil
- Steinmächer

== Rheinhessen ==
In the Rheinhessen there are three Bereiche (in bold) and 24 Großlagen.

Bingen

- Abtey
- Adelberg
- Kaiserpfalz
- Kurfüstenstück
- Rheingrafenstein
- Sankt Rochuskapelle

Nierstein

- Auflangen
- Domherr
- Güldenmorgen
- Gutes Domtal
- Krötenbrunnen
- Petersberg
- Rehbach
- Rheinblick
- Sankt Alban
- Spiegelberg
- Vogelsgärten

Wonnegau

- Bergkloster
- Burg Rodenstein
- Domblick
- Gotteshilfe
- Liebfrauenmorgen
- Pilgerpfad
- Sybillinenstein

== Saale-Unstrut ==
In Saale-Unstrut there are two Bereiche (in bold) and five Großlagen.

Schlossneuenburg

- Blütengrund
- Göttersitz
- Kelterberg
- Schweigenberg

Thüringen

- Mark Brandenburg

== Saxony ==
In Saxony, also known as Sachsen, there are three Bereiche (in bold) and four Großlagen.

Dresden

- Elbhänge
- Lössnitz

Elstertal
Meissen

- Schloss-Weinberg
- Spaargebirge

== Württemberg ==
In Württemberg there are six Bereiche (in bold) and 17 Großlagen.

Bayerischer Bodensee

- Lindauer Seegarten

Kocher-Jagst-Tauber

- Kocherberg
- Tauberberg

Oberer Neckar
Remstal-Stuttgart

- Hohenneuffen
- Kopf
- Sonnenbühl
- Wartbühl
- Weinsteige

Württembergisch Bodensee
Württembergisch Unterland

- Heuchelberg
- Kirchenweinberg
- Lindelberg
- Salzberg
- Schalkstein
- Schozachtal
- Staufenberg
- Stromberg
- Wunnenstein

== Tafelwein regions ==
There are four main wine regions that produce German Tafelwein and eight sub-regions.

Rhein-Mosel-sub-regions

- Rhein
- Mosel
- Saar

Bayern-sub regions

- Main
- Donau
- Lindau

Neckar Oberrhein-sub regions

- Burgengau
- Römertor

Stargarder Land

== Landwein regions ==
There are 26 wine regions that produce German Landwein. The Anbaugebiet where the region is located in is in parentheses.

- Ahrtaler (Ahr)
- Badischer (Baden)
  - Südbadischer (Baden)
  - Unterbadischer (Baden)
- Landwein Neckar (Baden-Württemberg)
- Landwein Oberrhein (Baden-Palatinate)
- Landwein Rhein-Neckar (Baden-Württemberg)
- Taubertäler (Baden)
- Landwein Main - Fränkischer (Franconia)
- Regensburger (Franconia)
- Starkenburger (Hessische Bergstraße)
- Rheinburgen (Mittelrhein)
- Landwein der Mosel (Mosel)
- Saarländischer (Mosel)
- Landwein der Ruwer (Mosel)
- Landwein der Saar (Mosel)
- Nahegauer (Nahe)
- Pfälzer (Palatinate)
- Rheingauer - Altrheingauer (Rheingau)
- Rheinischer (Rheinhessen)
- Mitteldeutscher (Saale-Unstrut)
- Sächsischer (Saxony)
- Bayerischer Bodensee (Württemberg)
- Schwäbischer (Württemberg)
- Brandenburger
- Landwein Rhein
- Mecklenburger
- Schleswig-Holsteinischer
