= Oberdollendorf =

- Stadtteil of Königswinter
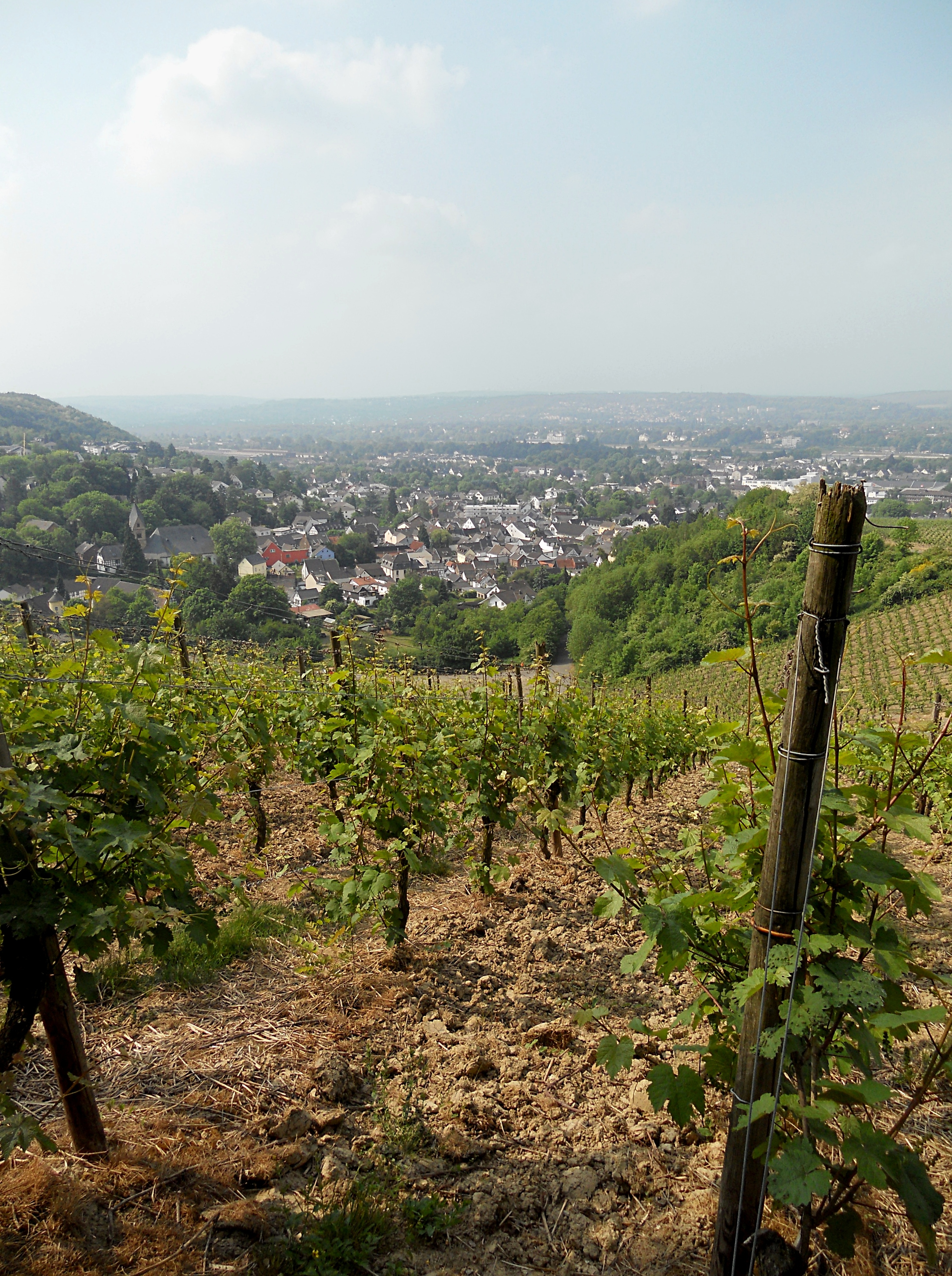
- Oberdollendorf from the vineyards
- Interactive map of Oberdollendorf
- Location within Germany Location within North Rhine-Westphalia
- Coordinates: 50°42′8″N 7°10′55″E
- Country: Germany
- State: North Rhine-Westphalia
- Admin. region: Köln
- District: Rhein-Sieg-Kreis
- Town: Königswinter
- Elevation: 60–150 m (200–490 ft)

Population (2012-12-31)
  - Total: 5,362
- Time zone: UTC+01:00 (CET)
  - Summer (DST): UTC+02:00 (CEST)
- Postal codes: 53639
- Dialling codes: 02223
- Vehicle registration: SU
- Website: www.oberdollendorf.de

Oberdollendorf is a municipal district of Königswinter, a city in the Rhein-Sieg district, in North Rhine-Westphalia, Germany. The vineyards which dominate the town are part of the Mittelrhein wine region.

== Geography ==
The town is situated between Niederdollendorf on the right bank of the Rhine and the Siebengebirge mountain range. It borders Königswinter proper in the south and the Bonn districts of Oberkassel in the north. It includes the borough Römlinghoven.

== History ==
Dollendorf ("Dullendorf") was first referred to in a 966 document by Emperor Otto I, and an 1144 deed first made the distinction between Oberdollendorf and Niederdollendorf. From the 15th century onwards Oberdollendorf was part of the Duchy of Berg in its administrative unit of Löwenburg. In 1597 Oberdollendorf was part of the "Linz Concord" ("Linzer Eintracht"), a mutual defence treaty between cities along the Rhine.

The parishes of Niederdollendorf, Oberdollendorf and Oberkassel together formed the court system of Dollendorf. The parish Oberdollendorf was up to the dissolution of the Duchy of Berg in 1806 administered through a "Markgedinge", to which the seven commons ("freihofe") of the village seconded jurors: the Grevenhof of Heisterbach Abbey, the Mertenhof of the Merten Priory, the estates of the lords of Drachenfels, the Rennenbergerhof of the lords of Rennenberg, the Edelkirchenerhof of the lords of Edelkirchen in Römlinghoven and the "Klamerspol" of the Junkers zu Kalmit. The parish had following officers: a mayor, a parish administrator ("Kirchmeister"), a sacristan (who doubled as a schoolmaster) and a gendarm ("Schütze"). They were appointed by the "Markgedinge" and -with the exception of the sacristan- regularly (sometimes annually) replaced.

From 1816 to 1969 the municipality of Oberdollendorf was part of the mayoralty of Oberkassel, within Prussia's Rhine Province. From 1949 to 1955 the town formed part of the "Enklave Bonn", a special administrative area set up around the provisional seat of government of the Federal Republic of Germany under the command of the Allied High Commission. As part of the municipal reorganization of Bonn in 1969 the town was assigned to the city of Königswinter.

== Demography ==
Population data (including its borough Römlinghoven)

- 1815: 966
- 1816: 991
- 1825: 1,214
- 1871: 1,386
- 1885: 1,395
- 1905: 2,067
- 1925: 2,504
- 1933: 2,571
- 1939: 2,471
- 1946: 3,199
- 1967: 4,790
- 2012: 5,362

== Economy ==
Until well into the 19th century the economic activity in Oberdollendorf was dominated by wine production. In 1878, 51.06 hectares were under cultivation, which dropped to 23 hectares in 1906 and 5.5 hectares in 1924. Following the Great Depression job creation programs encouraged re-cultivation and the area again rose to 23 hectares in 1934. By 1939 Oberdollendorf counted 89 wineries, although most of them were only operated as a sideline to another business. Today there is only one winery left.

The vineyards on the western slope of the "Dollendorfer Hardt" are classified as part of the Mittelrhein wine growing region, Siebengebirge wine district ("Bereich"), Petersberg site ("Großlage") and from north to south include the vineyards of Rosenhügel, Laurentiusberg and Sülzenberg.

== Main sights ==
- The Catholic Church of Saint Laurentius.
- The "Brückenhofmuseum", a small museum with a permanent collection on local history and temporary exhibitions covering regional themes and art.
- A statue of Caesarius of Heisterbach by the artist Ernemann Sander.
- "Gut Sülz", a listed building at the foot of the Sülzenberg vineyards. A working winery until 1967, it now houses a restaurant
- A 2 kilometre wine trail through the vines has information panels on wine and viticulture.
- the ruins of Heisterbach Abbey.

== Notable residents ==
- Caspar Joseph Brambach
- Wilhelm Brambach
