= Brambach =

Brambach is a surname. Notable people with the surname include:

- Wilhelm Brambach (17 December 1841 – 26 February 1932), German classical scholar, music historian, and librarian
- Martin Brambach (born 1967), German actor
- Caspar Joseph Brambach (14 July 1833 – 20 June 1902), 19th-century German musician, pedagogue and composer
