= Mittelrhein =

Mittelrhein may refer to:

- Middle Rhine (German: Mittelrhein), the Rhine River between Bingen and Bonn, Germany
- Mittelrhein (wine region), region (Anbaugebiet) for quality wine in Germany
