= Heisterbach Abbey =

Cistercian monastery in Rhine-Westphalia, Germany

Coordinates: 50°41′43″N 7°12′50″E

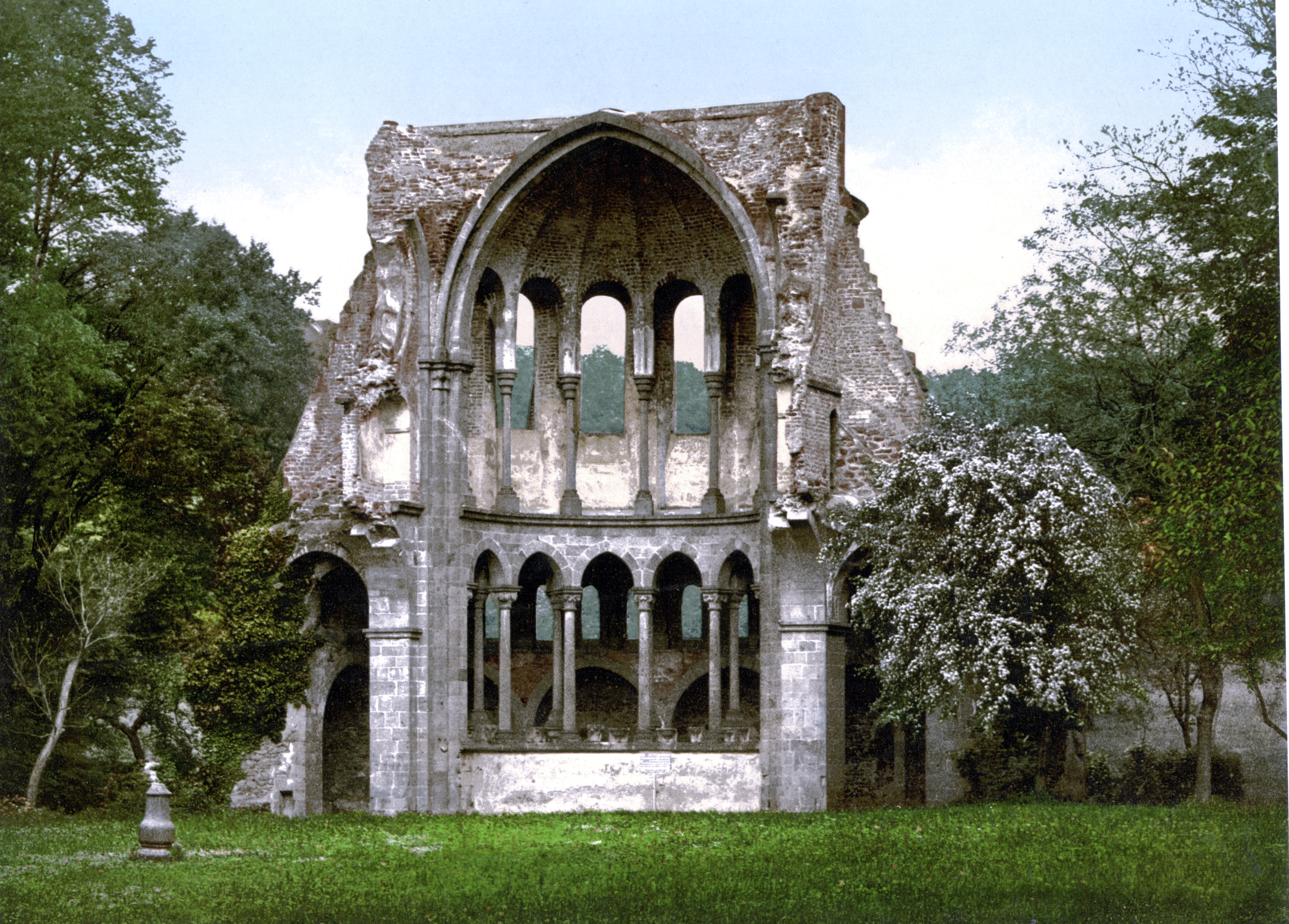
Ruins of Heisterbach Abbey, c. 1900

Heisterbach Abbey (Kloster Heisterbach; also Petersthal, formerly Petersberg) was a Cistercian monastery in the Siebengebirge near Oberdollendorf in North Rhine-Westphalia, Germany.

== Petersberg ==
The tradition of its origin is that a knight named Walther lived as a hermit on the Stromberg, also known as the Petersberg, one of the mountains forming the Siebengebirge. When numerous disciples began to settle near his cell, he built a monastery in 1134, where the community lived according to the Rule of St. Augustine. After the death of Walther however his disciples left the monastery on the Petersberg and built another on the Sulz.

In 1189 Philip, Archbishop of Cologne, requested Gisilbert, abbot of the Cistercian Himmerod Abbey in the Bishopric of Trier, to re-settle the deserted monastery of Petersberg with Cistercians from Himmerod. On 22 March 1189, therefore, twelve Cistercian monks with the newly appointed Abbot Hermann took possession of it.

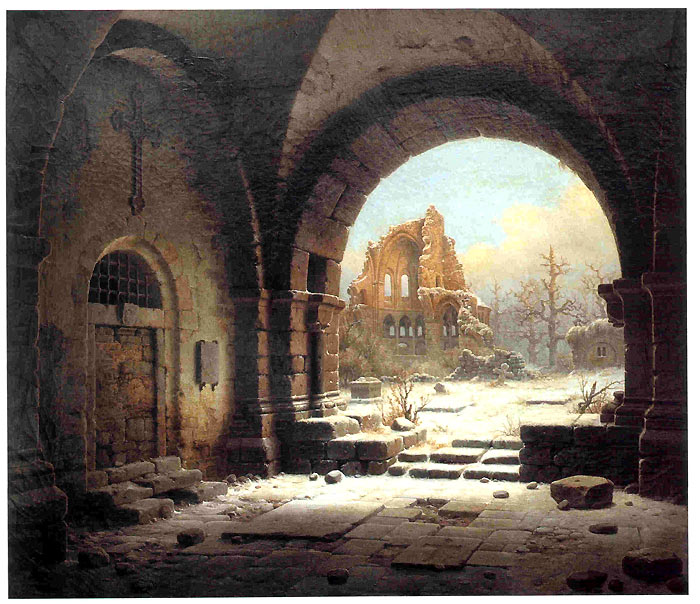
Heisterbach, Ruined Choir; Carl Hasenpflug, c. 1840

== Heisterbach ==
In 1202 they moved to the lower Peterstal (Valle St. Petri), where they built a new monastery which they called Petersthal or Heisterbach, which was the name which prevailed. In 1205 Abbot Gevard of Heisterbach and Reimer of Rommersdorf mediated a conflict between the counts of Sayne and Count Dietrich of Landsberg.

The famous basilica of Heisterbach was begun by Abbot Gerard (1195–1208), and consecrated in 1237 under Abbot Henry (1208–1244). Being built during the period of transition from the Romanesque round arch to the Gothic pointed arch, its style of architecture was a combination of the Romanesque and the Gothic. It was the largest church in the Rhine Valley after the Romanesque Cologne Cathedral.

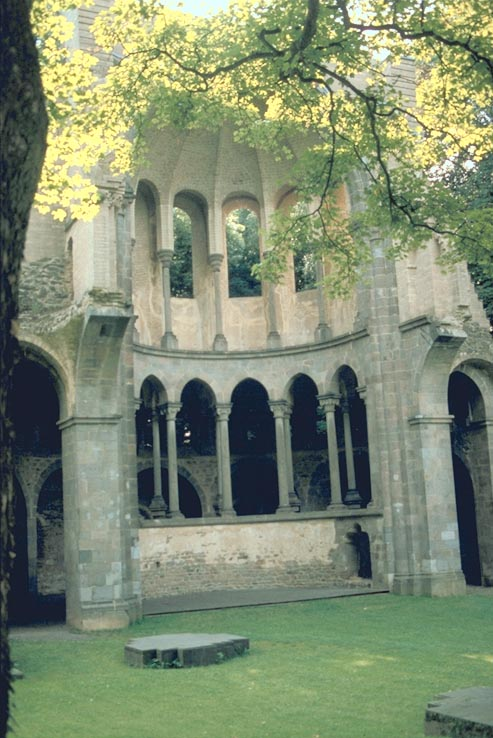
Abbey ruins

Heisterbach, which had large possessions and drew revenues from many neighbouring towns, remained one of the most flourishing Cistercian monasteries until its suppression in 1803. The library and the archives were given to the city of Düsseldorf; the monastery and the church were sold and torn down in 1809, and only the apse with the ruins of the choir remains.

In 1820, the George William, Prince of Schaumburg-Lippe purchased the remains of the former Abbey and set up an English garden.

Caesarius of Heisterbach, one of the best-known members of the Cistercian Order, was a monk at this abbey (1199–c. 1240). A monument was erected in his honour near the ruins in 1897.

The Stiftung Abtei Heisterbach (Heisterbach Abbey Foundation) was founded in 1984 to preserve the former Heisterbach Abbey as a cultural and historical monument.

A legend, reminiscent of "Rip Van Winkle", concerns a monk, who besieged by doubts, fell asleep in the nearby forest and awoke 300 years later. Karl Wilhelm Muller (1813 - 1894) wrote a poem based on the legend.

== Literature ==
- Caesarius von Heisterbach: Dialogus Miraculorum – Dialog über die Wunder. Nikolaus Nösges and Horst Schneider eds.,5 vols. Latin and German. Brepols Publishers, Turnhout 2009, ISBN 978-2-503-52940-0
