= Dornfelder =

Variety of grape

- Grape (Vitis)
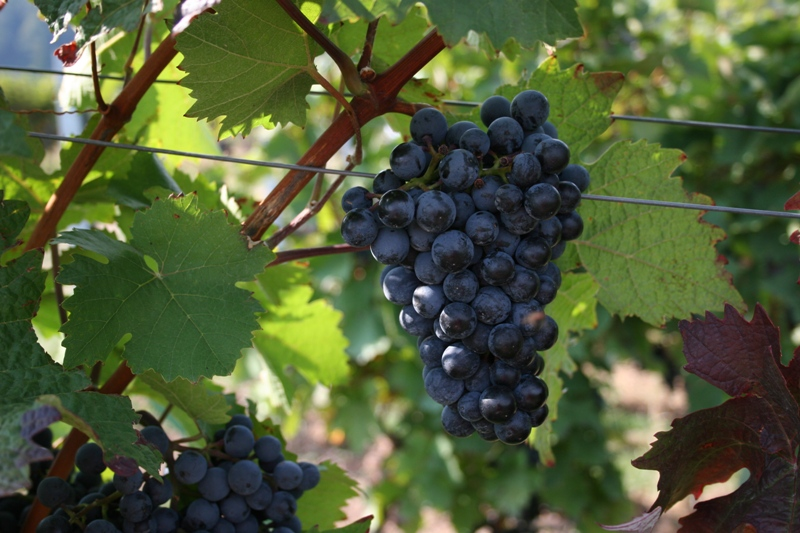
- Mature Dornfelder grapes
- Species: Vitis vinifera
- Also called: We S 341
- Origin: Weinsberg, Germany
- Notable regions: Germany
- VIVC number: 3659

Dornfelder (German: [ˈdɔʁnˌfɛldɐ]) is a dark-skinned variety of grape of German origin used for red wine. It was created by August Herold (1902–1973) at the grape breeding institute in Weinsberg in the Württemberg region in 1955. Herold crossed the grape varieties Helfensteiner and Heroldrebe, the latter which bears his name, to create Dornfelder. Helfensteiner (Frühburgunder/Pinot Noir Précoce × Trollinger/Schiava Grossa) and Heroldrebe (Blauer Portugieser × Blaufränkisch/Lemberger) were both crosses created some decades earlier by Herold. Dornfelder received varietal protection and was released for cultivation in 1979. It was named in honor of Immanuel August Ludwig Dornfeld (1796–1869), a senior civil servant who was instrumental in creating the viticultural school in Weinsberg.

Traditionally, the red wines of Germany were mostly pale and light-bodied, but new breeds of dark-skinned grapes led by Dornfelder have allowed the production of more internationally styled reds. Dornfelder has a depth of color, good acidity and the ability to benefit from barrique aging and the associated oak flavours. In comparison to traditional red wine varieties of Germany, Dornfelder is easier to grow than Spätburgunder, has better resistance to rot than Blauer Portugieser (as well as deeper color, more powerful flavours and more tannin), has stronger stalks than Trollinger, ripens earlier than Lemberger, and achieves higher must weights, i.e., higher natural alcohol levels than most of these varieties. Dornfelder can be very productive, and yield up to 120 hectoliter per hectare, but quality-conscious producers typically keep yields much lower. Higher-quality Dornfelder wines are velvety textured, slightly floral, often show flavours of plums, blackberries or cherries, and are typically oaked. Sometimes the wines have a hint of sweetness.

Dornfelder is the second most grown red wine grape variety in Germany. Steadily increased plantings throughout the 1980s and 1990s allowed it to overtake Blauer Portugieser in 2001. It has established itself in most German regions, and been particularly successful in Rheinhessen and the Palatinate. In 2006, Dornfelder was grown on 8,231 hectares (20,340 acres) in Germany, and no longer has an increasing trend.

== History and relationship to other grapes ==
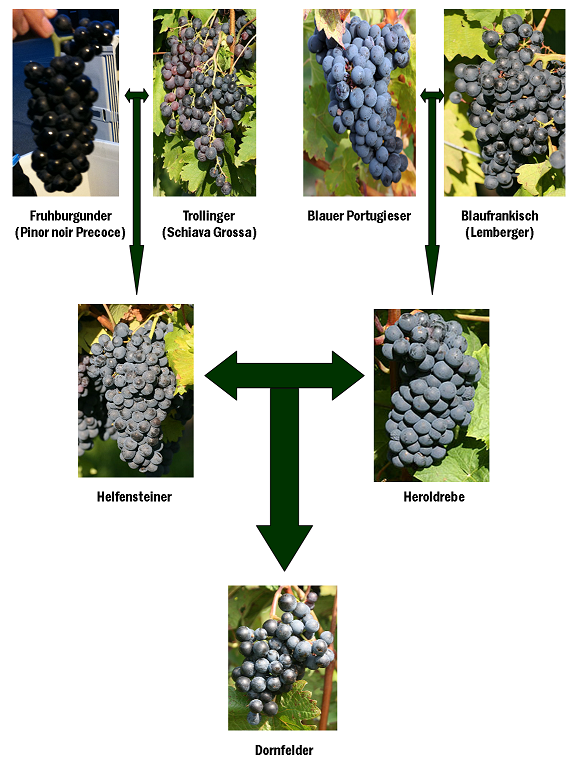
The family tree of Dornfelder showing its parent and grandparent varieties.

Dornfelder was created in 1956 at the Weinsberg Research Center in Baden-Württemberg by German grape breeder August Herold. The variety was created as a cross of two Vitis vinifera crossing previously created by Herold, Helfensteiner (a cross of Frühburgunder/Pinot Précoce noir and Trollinger/Schiava Grossa created in 1931) and Heroldrebe (a cross of Blauer Portugieser and Blaufränkisch/Lemberger created in 1929). The variety was named after one of the 19th century founders of the school of viticulture at Weinsberg, Immanuel August Ludwig Dornfeld.

Originally created as a blending variety to add color to the pale red wines of Germany, plantings of Dornfelder were initially slow to take off. By 1970 there was only around 100 hectares (250 acres) of the variety planted. The grape was officially approved for German wine production in 1980 with plantings rapidly increasing throughout the rest of the 20th century. From 2000 to 2005-2006, plantings again doubled as wine produced from Dornfelder earn commercial success.

As a successful vinifera crossing, Dornfelder was used as a parent variety to create several new varieties including Acolon (a 1971 crossing with Blaufränkisch), Cabernet Dorio (a 1971 crossing with Cabernet Sauvignon), Cabernet Dorsa (another 1971 crossing with Cabernet Sauvignon) and Monarch (a 1988 crossing with Solaris).

== Viticulture ==
Dornfelder was bred to be a vigorous and high yielding grape variety, easily capable of producing up to 120 hl/ha (≈ 6 tons/acre), with a high concentration of color phenolics that can contribute to producing a darker colored red wine than what was typically found in German wine regions. The variety tends to be an early to mid budding and ripening grapevine with thick skins that give it good resistance to the viticultural hazards of fungal infections such as botrytis bunch rot.

== Wine regions ==
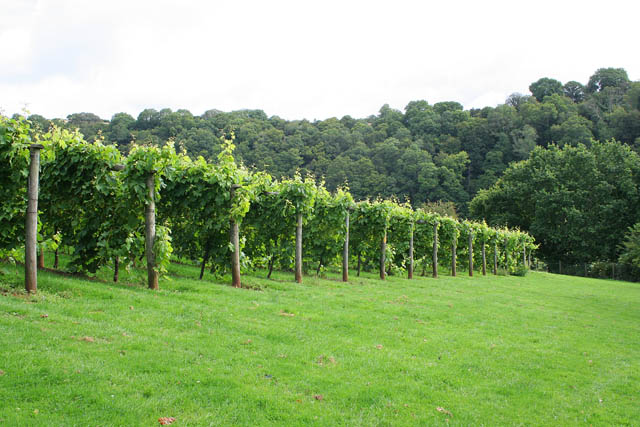
A vineyard of Dornfelder vines in the county of Devon in southwest England.

Most plantings of Dornfelder can be found in its viticultural homeland of Germany where there were 8,101 hectares (20,020 acres) plantings of the grape in production in 2012. Nearly 3,000 hectares (7,400 acres) of those plantings were found in Germany's two largest wine regions, the Palatinate and Rheinhessen. From Germany, plantings of Dornfelder spread in the late 20th century to nearby Switzerland where, by 2009, there were 21 hectares (52 acres) found mostly in the cantons of Schwyz and Zürich.

The grape was first introduced to England in the late 1980s where it has mostly been used for rosés and sparkling wine production. While some English producers do make light bodied red wines, its use for red wine production has largely fallen out of favor as the hybrid grape Regent gains in popularity. By 2007 there were an estimated 16 hectares (40 acres) in England. There are some limited plantings of Dornfelder in the Czech Republic and Poland.

Outside of Europe, Dornfelder can be found in the Lodi and Sta. Rita Hills AVA of California, the Finger Lakes AVA of New York as well as in Pennsylvania and Virginia. Plantings of the grape can also be found in Canada in the British Columbia wine region of Vancouver Island. In the Rio Grande do Sul region of Brazil, some South American wine producers are experimenting with the variety as are Japanese winemakers on the island of Hokkaido where there 5 hectares (12 acres) of Dornfelder in production as of 2009.

== Styles ==
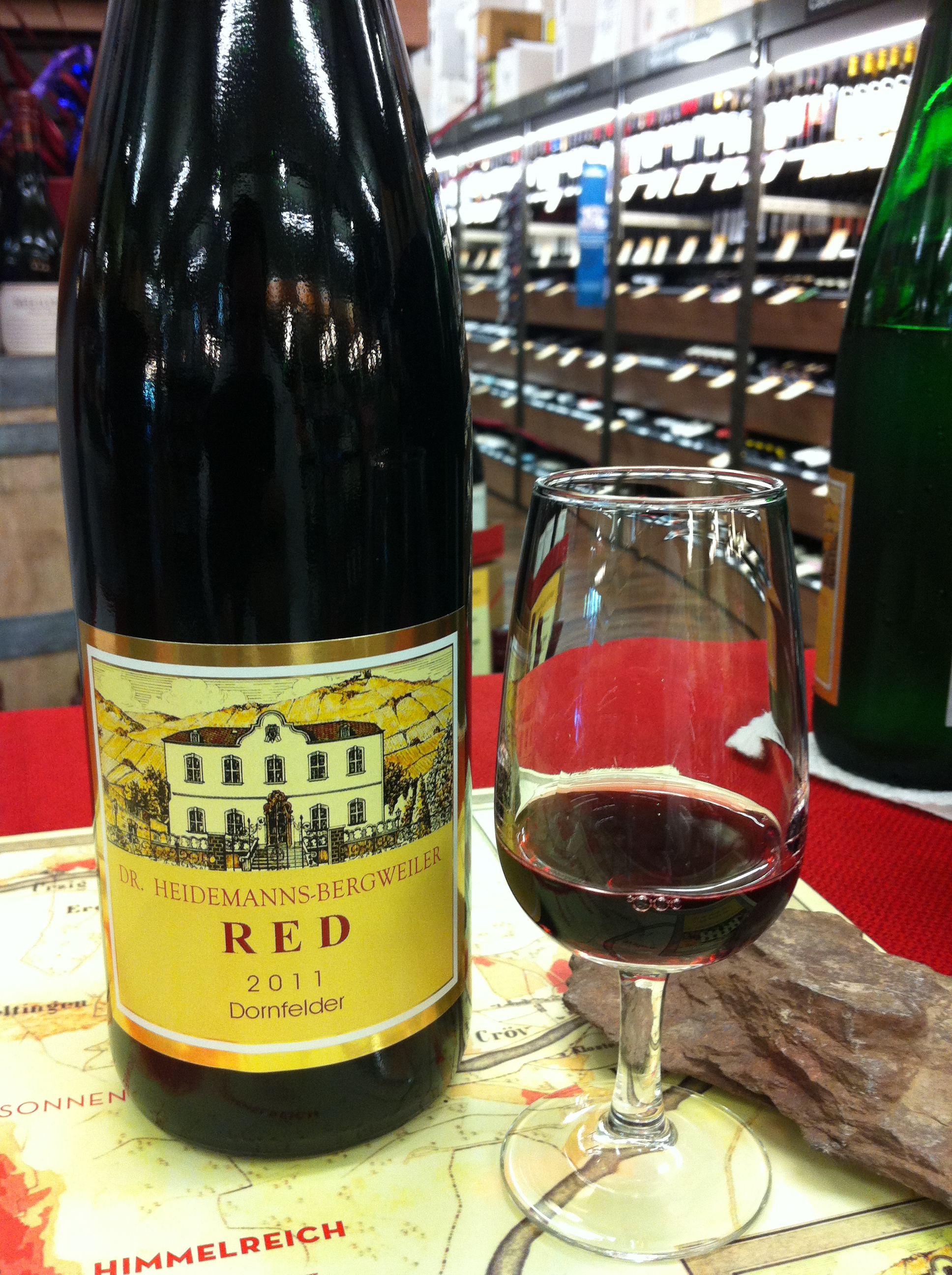
A Dornfelder wine from Germany.

Due to its thick skins that are high in phenolic compounds, such as anthocyanins, Dornfelder tends to produce deeply colored red wines that can have a soft, rich texture in the mouthfeel. The wine usually have a fair amount of acidity with some examples showing floral aroma notes. The overall quality of the wines produced from Dornfelder tend to be dependent on harvest yields with wines produced from lower yields being more likely to have the concentration of fruit needed to complement a period of oak aging that can add more body and complexity to the wine.

Early in its history, German producers would use Dornfelder to make Beaujolais nouveau style wine using carbonic maceration to make a light bodied, fruity wine, sometimes with a bit of residual sugar. Today, most examples of Dornfelder are fermented dry, though some off-dry examples exist, with flavors of sour cherry and blackberries.

== Synonyms ==
The only known synonyms for Dornfelder are its breeding codes Weinsberg S 341 and We S 341. S for seedling, WE S for Weinsberg seedling.
