= Heroldrebe =

Variety of grape

- Grape (Vitis)
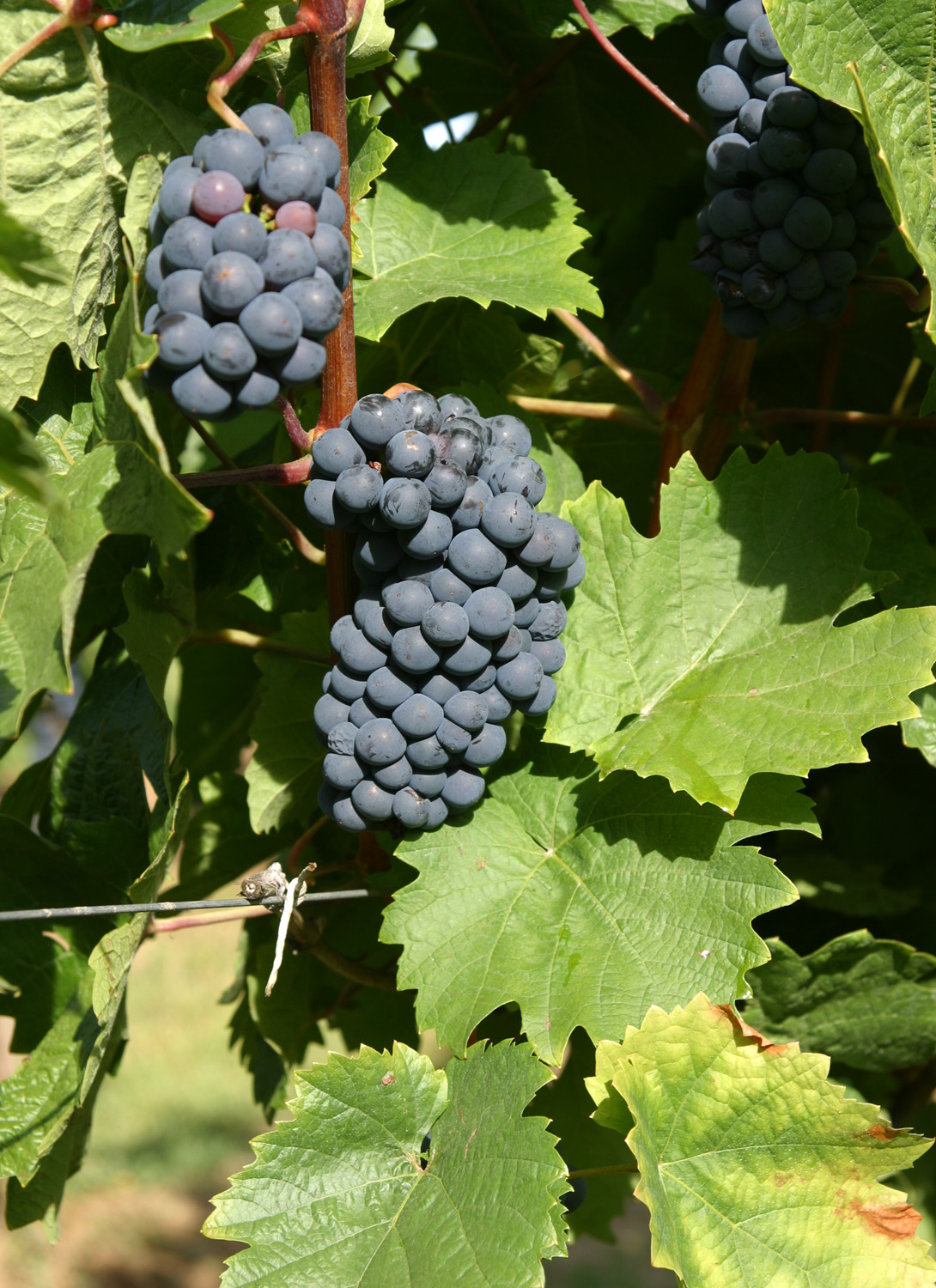
- Heroldrebe grapes
- Color of berry skin: Noir
- Species: Vitis vinifera
- Also called: Weinsberg S 130
- Origin: Germany
- Original pedigree: Blauer Portugieser × Blaufränkisch
- Breeder: August Herold
- Breeding institute: Staatliche Lehr- und Versuchsanstalt für Wein- und Obstbau Weinsberg
- Year of crossing: 1929
- VIVC number: 5365

Heroldrebe is a red German wine grape variety produced by crossing Blauer Portugieser and Lemberger. It was created by August Herold at the grape breeding institute in Weinsberg in the Württemberg region in 1929, and was named after him.

One of Heroldrebe's drawbacks is its relatively late ripening; it is harvested at about the same time as Pinot noir. Heroldrebe was grown on a total of 155 hectares (380 acres) in Germany in 2008, with a decreasing trend. There were 99 hectares (240 acres) in Palatinate, 32 hectares (79 acres) in Rheinhessen, and 23 hectares (57 acres) in Württemberg. In Palatinate it is typically used to produce light, almost pinkish, colored wines.

== Synonyms ==
The only synonyms of Heroldrebe is its breeding code We S 130 or Weinsberg S 130.

== Offspring ==
Heroldrebe was later crossed with Helfensteiner by Herold to produce Dornfelder, which has become the most widely planted of the grape varieties created by Herold. Hegel is also Helfensteiner × Heroldrebe.
