= Caesarius of Heisterbach =

German Cistercian prior (c. 1180–1240)

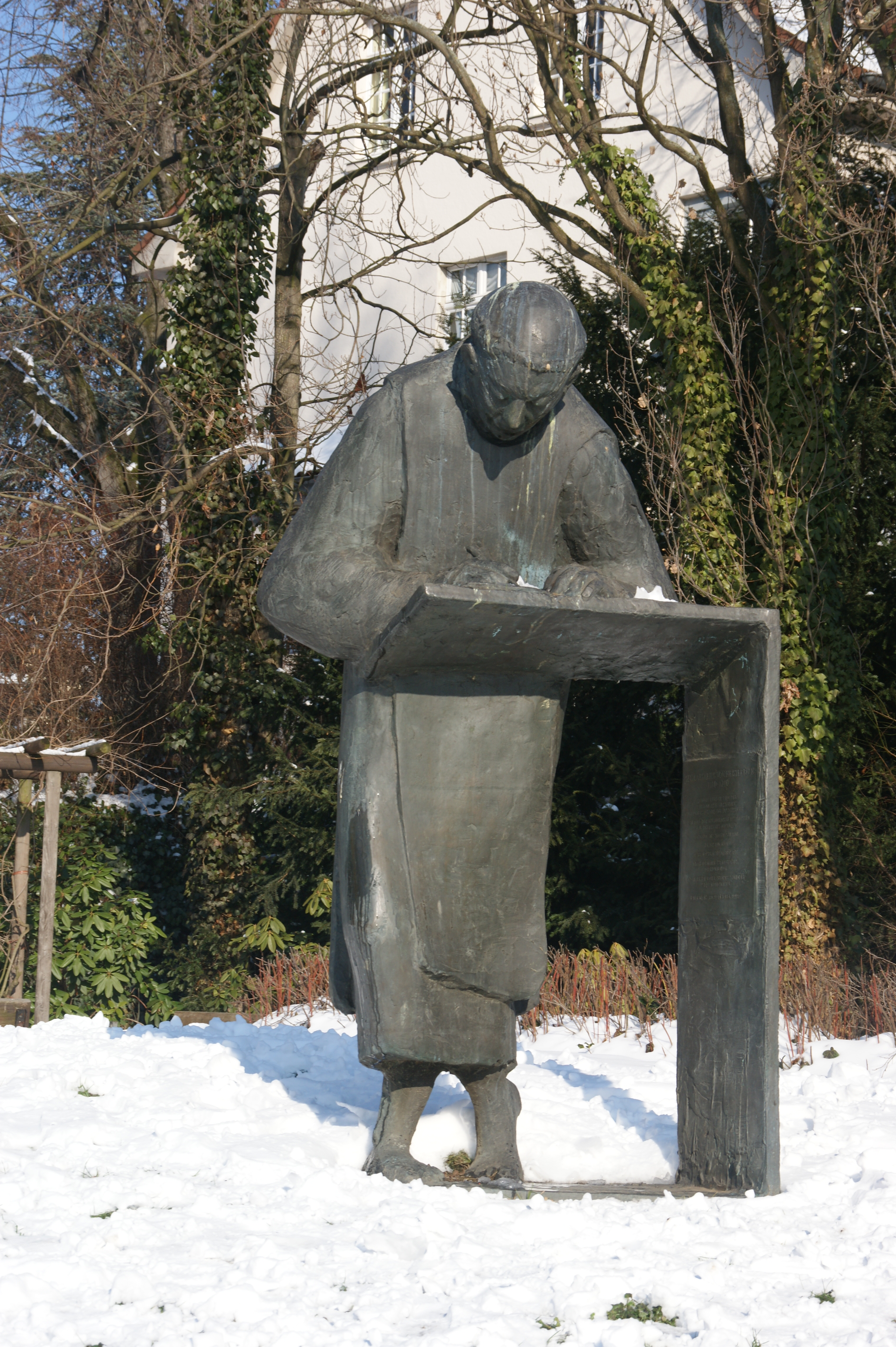
- Statue of Caesarius made by Ernemann Sander in Königswinter-Oberdollendorf
- Born: c. 1180
- Died: c. 1240

Caesarius of Heisterbach (c. 1180 – c. 1240), sometimes erroneously called, in English, Caesar of Heisterbach, was the prior of a Cistercian monastery, Heisterbach Abbey, which was located in the Siebengebirge, near the small town of Oberdollendorf, Germany.

== Life ==
Born about 1170 at or near Cologne, he was educated at the Cathedral School, where he studied the theology of St. Ambrose, St. Augustine, St. Jerome, and St. Gregory the Great; the philosophy of Boethius, and the literary masterpieces of Virgil, Ovid, Seneca, and Claudian. He was a gifted and diligent scholar and upon the completion of his studies was thoroughly conversant with the writings of the Fathers of the Church and master of a refined and fluent Latin style.

Acting on the advice of Gevard, Abbot of Heisterbach, Caesarius entered that monastery in 1199 and after some time was appointed master of novices. It was his duty to imbue the candidates with the spirit of austere asceticism which then animated the Cistercian Order, and to instruct them in the necessary knowledge of theology.

Caesarius of Heisterbach is remembered for a paradoxical maxim concerning the rise and decline of monasteries according to which discipline causes prosperity in a monastery, and prosperity undermines discipline. He also gave the name of Titivillus as the demon who caused typographical errors in the work of scribes.

He is further known for having attributed a famous declaration to Arnaud Amalric, a leader in the Albigensian Crusade. Upon being asked how to distinguish Cathars from Catholics at the besieged town of Béziers, Arnaud supposedly replied "Caedite eos. Novit enim Dominus qui sunt eius", which translates as: "Slay them all, God will recognize his own." This statement is often cited as "Kill them all and let God sort them out." The historicity of the statement has been questioned, but Arnaud's alleged order as reported by Caesarius was likely seen at the time as reflecting highly on Arnaud. Both Arnaud and Caesarius were Cistercians, with Arnaud the head of the Cistercian Order at the time of Caesarius' writing, and Caesarius required an imprimatur. The incident was further included as an exemplum in Caesarius's Book of Miracles because (to Cistercians at least) it reflected well on Arnaud.

Heisterbach Abbey was dissolved in 1803, and the library and archives were given to the city of Düsseldorf. The monastery and the church were sold and demolished in 1809, only the ruined apse with fragments of the choir remaining. In 1897 a monument was erected nearby in honour of Caesarius.

== Writings ==
His fame as teacher soon spread far beyond the walls of his monastery and, yielding to requests from various quarters, Abbot Henry, Gevard's successor, asked Caesarius to write an abstract of his teachings.

As an author, Caesarius of Heisterbach is best known as the compiler of a book of hagiography, the Dialogus miraculorum (ca. 1219-1223), a collection of 746 miracle stories arranged according to twelve distinctions. The tales are told in the form of dialogues between a monk and a novice. The work was often referred to by preachers seeking material for sermons in the Late Middle Ages. It was extremely popular and was widely distributed, and its popularity was rivaled only, perhaps, by the Golden Legend of Jacobus de Voragine. A vision reported in the book provided the source for the iconography of the Virgin of Mercy.

The first writings of Caesarius were sermons, which he wrote for his own use. But it was not long before his fellow monks approached him with requests for elaboration and explanation. His ninth book was written because his fellow monks asked him for a simple and clearly understandable explanation of the Maria sequence "Ave preclara maris stella". His other writings were responses to requests.

Caesarius often complained that his works were taken out of his hand, unfinished and uncorrected. They were extremely well-known and popular, and some sixty known transcriptions of the Dialogus miraculorum preceded the publication of a critical edition.

In his sermons Caesarius treats passages from the Bible, often examining psalms or parts of them. He also relates the movements of heavenly bodies to the destinies of men. His homilies, on the other hand, deal with the evangelical texts of the Sundays and festivals throughout the entire Church year, and are to be regarded as theological tracts and meditations rather than sermons and speeches. They are directed not to laymen, but to monks and novices of the Cistercian Order. The interpretations often deal with the lives of monks.

The writings of Caesarius are of considerable importance for the study of medieval homiletics.
