= Cabernet Dorsa =

Variety of grape

- Grape (Vitis)
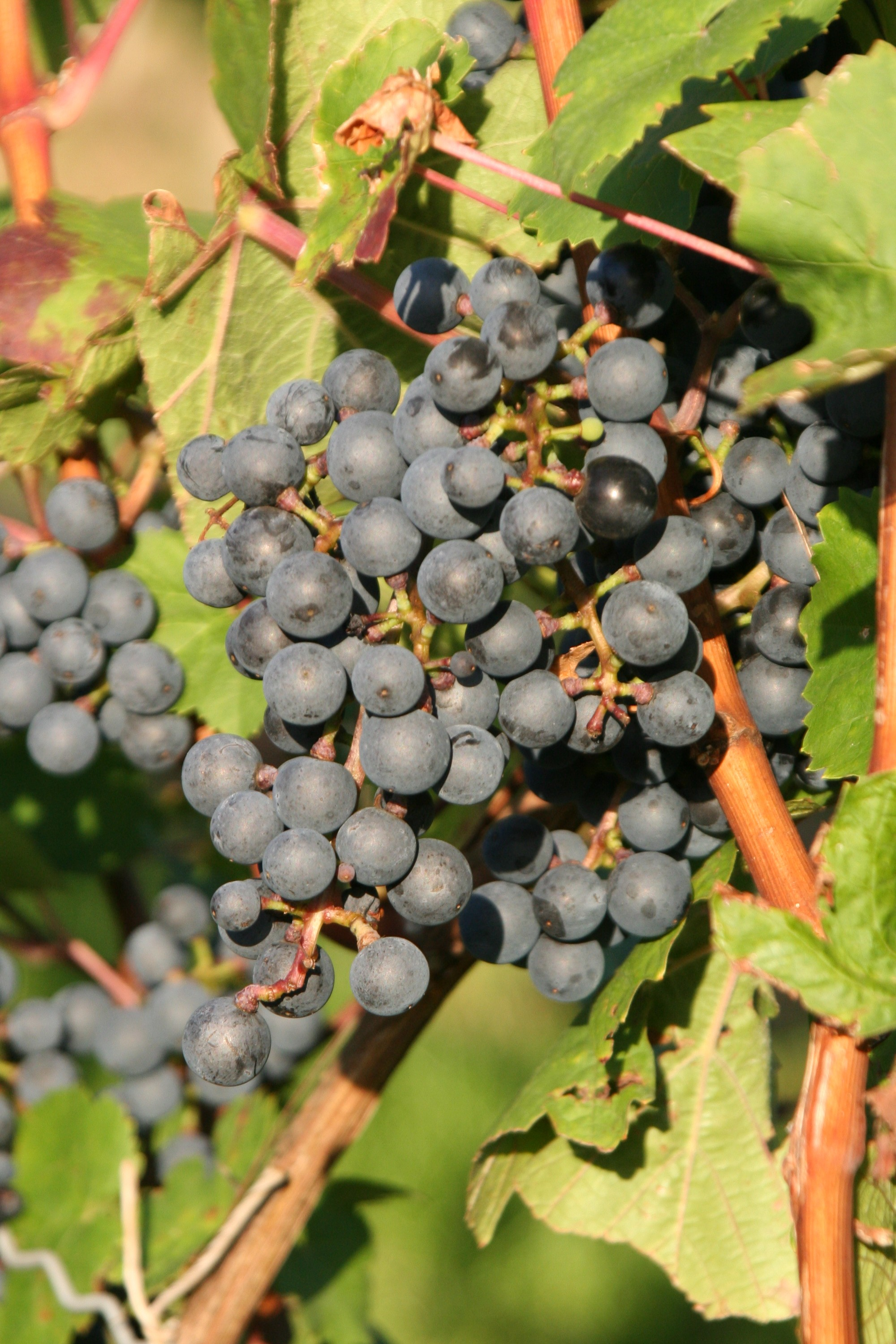
- Cabernet Dorsa grapes growing in Württemberg
- Color of berry skin: blue-black, black berry skin
- Species: Vitis vinifera
- Also called: We 71-817-92
- Origin: Weinsberg, Palatinate, Germany
- VIVC number: 20002

Cabernet Dorsa is a dark-skinned variety of grape used for red wine. It was created at a grape breeding institute in Weinsberg in the Württemberg wine region of Germany in 1971 by crossing the Blaufränkisch and Dornfelder varieties. Cabernet Dorsa received varietal protection and was released for general cultivation in 2003. The vines of Cabernet Dorsa show good winter hardiness and the grapes reach higher must weights than Dornfelder or Spätburgunder under typical German growing conditions.

In 2006, there were 214 hectares (530 acres) of Cabernet Dorsa in Germany, with an increasing trend. In 2000, before the variety's general release, there existed only 2.87 hectares (7.1 acres) of experimental plantations.

Cabernet Dorsa wines are deep in colour, rich in tannin, have noticeable aromas of cherry and bell peppers and are considered well suited for oak barrel aging.

It is known under the synonyms (breeding codes) We 71-817-92 with We denoting Weinsberg.
