= Acolon =

Variety of grape

- Grape (Vitis)
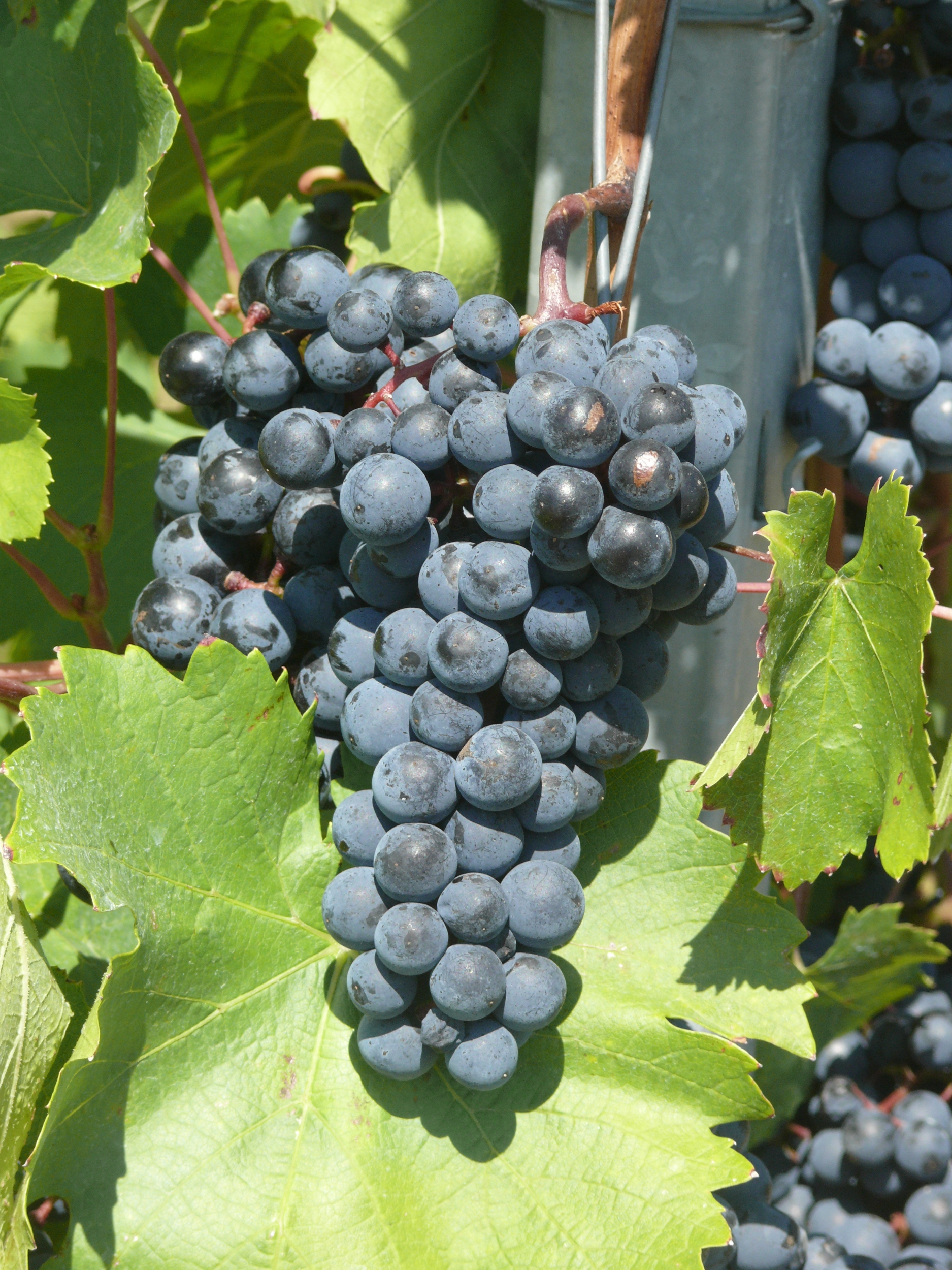
- Color of berry skin: Noir
- Species: Vitis vinifera
- Origin: Germany
- Original pedigree: Blaufränkisch × Dornfelder
- Notable regions: Württemberg, Germany
- Breeder: Bernd Hill
- Breeding institute: Staatliche Lehr- und Versuchsanstalt für Wein- und Obstbau Referat Rebenzüchtung und Rebenveredlung
- Year of crossing: 1971
- Formation of seeds: Complete
- Sex of flowers: Hermaphrodite
- VIVC number: 17123

Acolon is a German wine grape variety, a cross between Blauer Lemberger (Blaufränkisch) and Dornfelder.

It was created in 1971 at the Staatliche Lehr- und Versuchsanstalt für Wein- und Obstbau in Weinsberg (nr. Württemberg), Germany. The variety was officially recognised in 2002. It ripens early and produces a very color-intensive wine with mild tannins, resembling Lemberger. Currently it is growing experimentally on 1.35 square kilometres. Since 1981 it has often been used as a partner in creating new genetically diverse varieties.
