= Kerner (grape) =

Variety of grape

- Grape (Vitis)
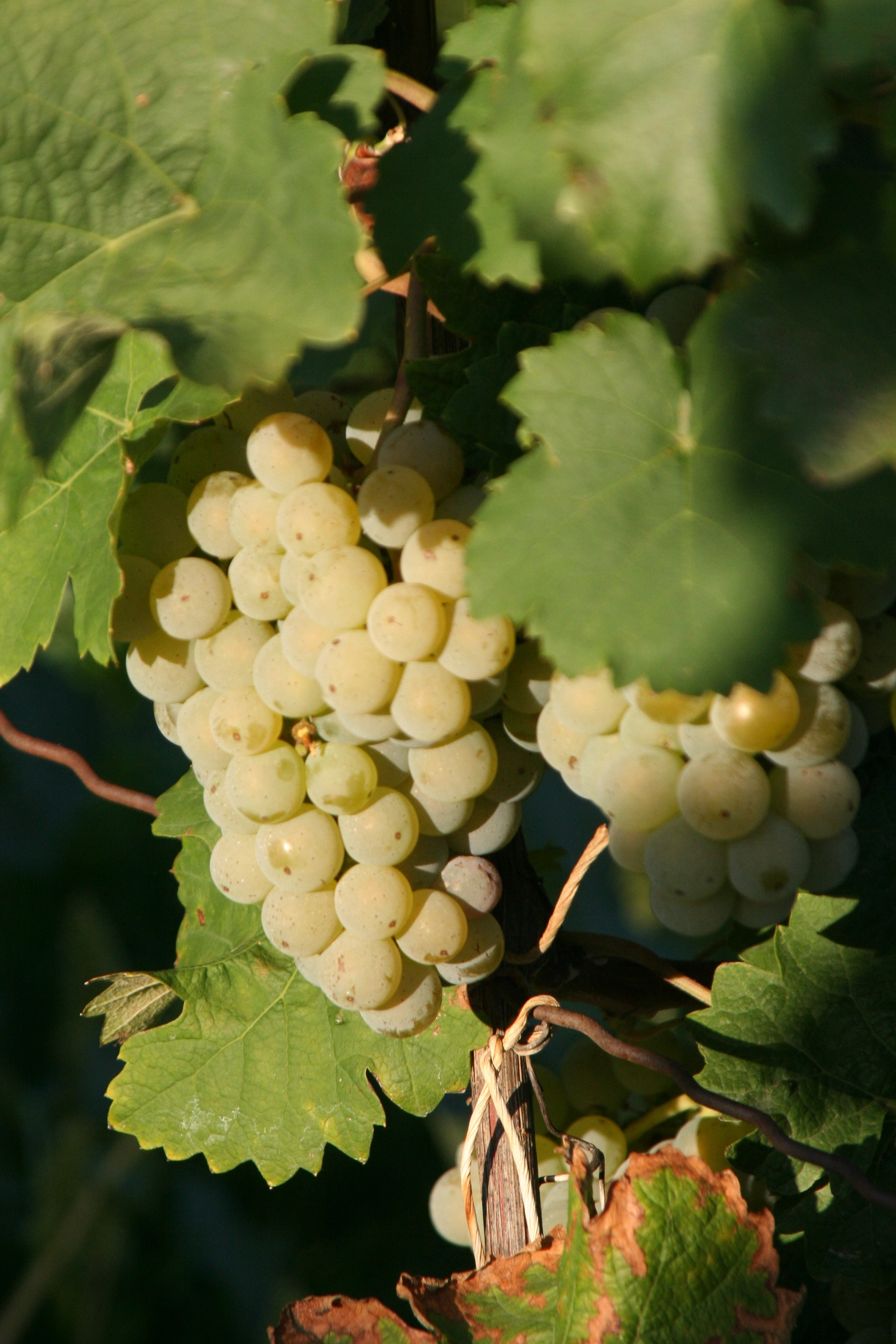
- Kerner grapes
- Color of berry skin: Blanc
- Species: Vitis vinifera
- Also called: Weißer Herold, Weinsberg S 25-30
- Origin: Lauffen, Germany
- Notable regions: Germany
- VIVC number: 6123

The Kerner grape is an aromatic white grape variety. It was bred in 1929 by August Herold by crossing Trollinger (a red variety also known as Schiava grossa or Vernatsch) and Riesling. Herold was working at a plant breeding station in Lauffen in the Württemberg region of Germany. This station belonged to a state breeding institute headquartered in Weinsberg. It received varietal protection and was released for general cultivation in 1969.

Kerner is named for Justinus Kerner, a poet and physician from Swabia whose works included songs and poetry on wine. Kerner lived from 1818 to his death in Weinsberg.

In 2006 Kerner was the 8th most planted variety in Germany with 4,004 hectares (9,890 acres) and 3.9% of the total vineyard surface. The trend since the mid-1990s is that German plantations of Kerner decrease, just as the case for all other "new breeds" of white varieties, such as Müller-Thurgau and Bacchus. German plantations of Kerner reached their highest point around 1990, with around 8,000 hectares (20,000 acres) and 7.5% of the total German vineyard surface. For a while around 1995 it was in fact the third most planted variety in Germany after Riesling and Müller-Thurgau.

Kerner is most commonly planted in the German regions of Palatinate, Rheinhessen, Mosel, and Württemberg, but it is also grown in Austria (Styria), Switzerland, the island of Hokkaido in Japan, Old Mission Peninsula in Michigan, and the Italian province of South Tyrol. It was introduced into South Tyrol in the early 1970s and awarded Denominazione di origine controllata (DOC) status in 1993.

== Plant ==
Kerner is hardy and generally is grown on a medium vigorous rootstock like SO4. The leaf is medium-sized with a dark green blade and a dentated leaf edge.

=== Grape ===
The grape is medium-sized and compact. Kerner buds late and have hardy shoots. Resistant to cold winters, it can survive at temperatures as low as −10 °C (14 °F).

Compared to Riesling, Kerner can be grown in less favourable conditions and has bigger yields. The ripening is in early October.

This vine grows on all types of soil, in general is grown on slopes and on sunny slopes it can be grown at elevations of up to 800–900 metres (2,600–3,000 ft).

This crossing is generally not sensitive to downy mildew, powdery mildew and botrytis, though disease-susceptibility increases in cold and extreme weather conditions

== Wine ==
Transparent straw yellow, sometimes with golden reflex. Pronounced varietal bouquet, often with a Muscat tone.

The flavour of Kerner resembles Riesling in having a bright and fruity flavour, but have a lower acidity and are described as having a more full taste.

== Synonyms ==
Kerner is known under the following synonyms: Herold Triumpf, Herold Weiss, Schiava Grossa x Riesling Renano WE 25/30, Trollinger x Riesling Renano WE S 25/30, WE S 2530, Weinsberg S 25-30, Weißer Herold.

== Offspring ==
The variety Kernling is a mutation of Kerner. Three varieties have been created by crossing Kerner with other varieties: Juwel and Silcher are both Kerner x Silvaner (but not identical, since each seed plant acquires a different combination of genetic material from its parents) and Roter Milan is Kerner x Pinot noir.
