= August Herold =

German agronomist (1902–1973)

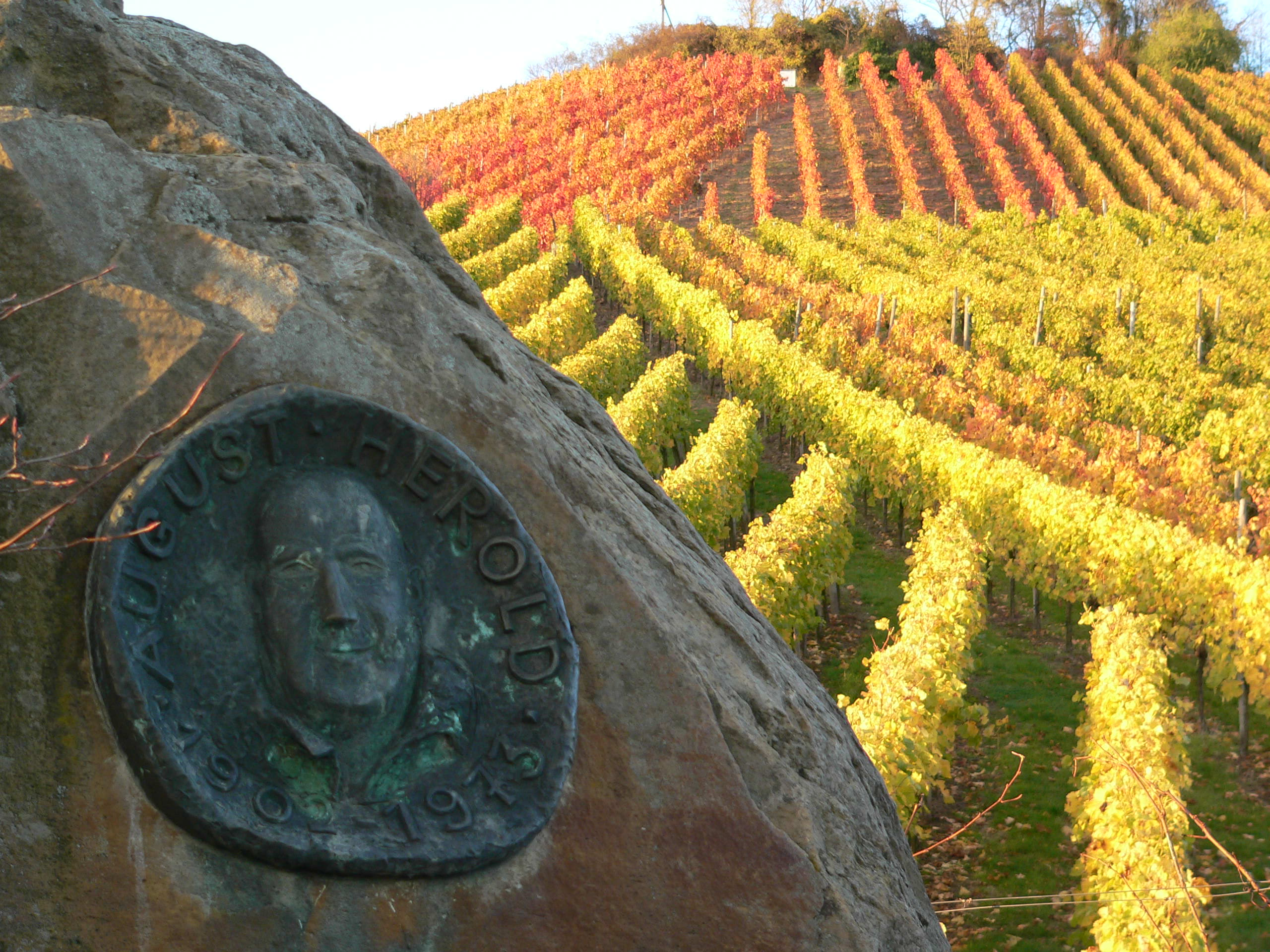
Commemorative plaque of August Herold in Scheuerberg, Neckarsulm

August Karl Herold (August 7, 1902 in Neckarsulm – January 8, 1973 in Neckarsulm) was a German grape breeder.

Herold graduated from the Agricultural College Hohenheim in 1925, worked at a grape breeding station in Naumburg 1926–1928 and in 1928 became the head of a grape breeding station in Weinsberg, which during his early years was called Württembergischen Anstalt für Rebenzüchtung und Rebenpfropfung and from 1947 Staatliche Lehr- und Versuchsanstalt für Wein- und Obstbau Weinsberg (LVWO). During the years 1941–1948 Herold was first called up for military service during World War II and then ended up as a prisoner of war of the Soviet Union. After coming home in 1948, he resumed his duties in Weinsberg and stayed on this post until retirement at the end of 1964.

Herold's main contributions to viticulture was a scientifically based grape breeding programme in Weinsberg, which produced several much-cultivated grape varieties. Among the varieties bred by him are Helfensteiner, Heroldrebe (named after him), Dornfelder and Kerner.
