= Helfensteiner =

Variety of grape

- Grape (Vitis)
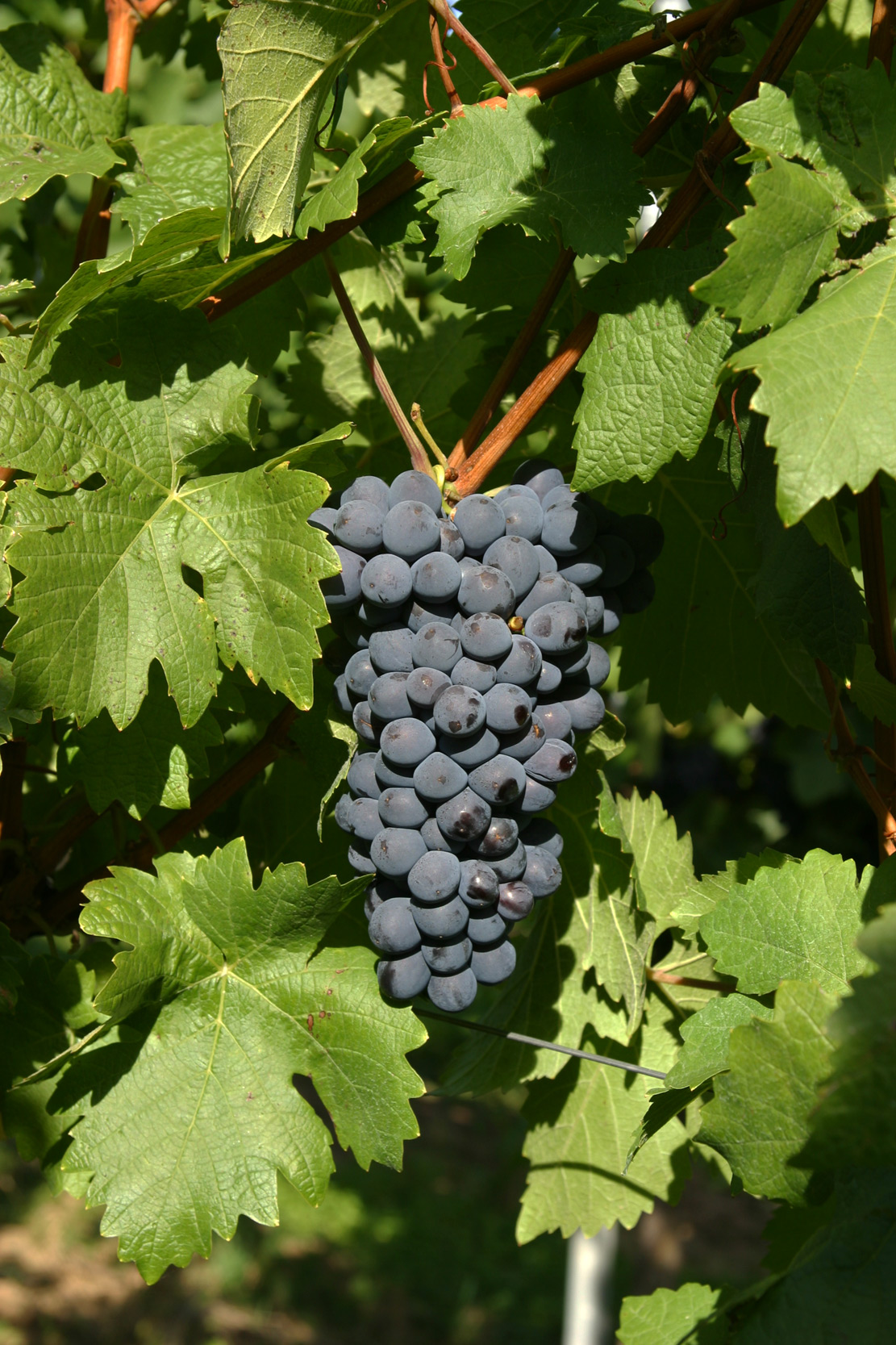
- Helfensteiner grapes
- Species: Vitis vinifera
- Also called: see below
- Origin: Germany
- VIVC number: 5345

Helfensteiner is a dark-skinned German wine grape crossing of the species Vitis vinifera, that was created in 1931 with the crossing of Frühburgunder (Pinot Précoce noir) and Trollinger (Schiava Grossa). It was created by August Herold at the grape breeding institute in Weinsberg in the Württemberg region.

The name of the variety is derived from that of the castle ruin Helfenstein close to Geislingen an der Steige.

A relatively small amount of Helfensteiner is cultivated in Württemberg, 19 hectares (47 acres) in 2008 (and less than 1 ha in the rest of Germany combined). It produces red wines of a fruity character, and rosé wines. The reason for the variety's limited popularity with growers is its very variable yield, which is due to its susceptibility to flowering problems.

Helfensteiner was later, in 1955, crossed by Herold with Heroldrebe to produce the much more successful Dornfelder. The variety Hegel shares the same parentage as Dornfelder.

== Synonyms ==
Helfensteiner is also known under its breeding code Weinsberg S 5332 and the synonyms Blauer Weinsberger and Helfensteyner.
