= Juwel (grape) =

Variety of grape

Jewel
- Grape (Vitis)
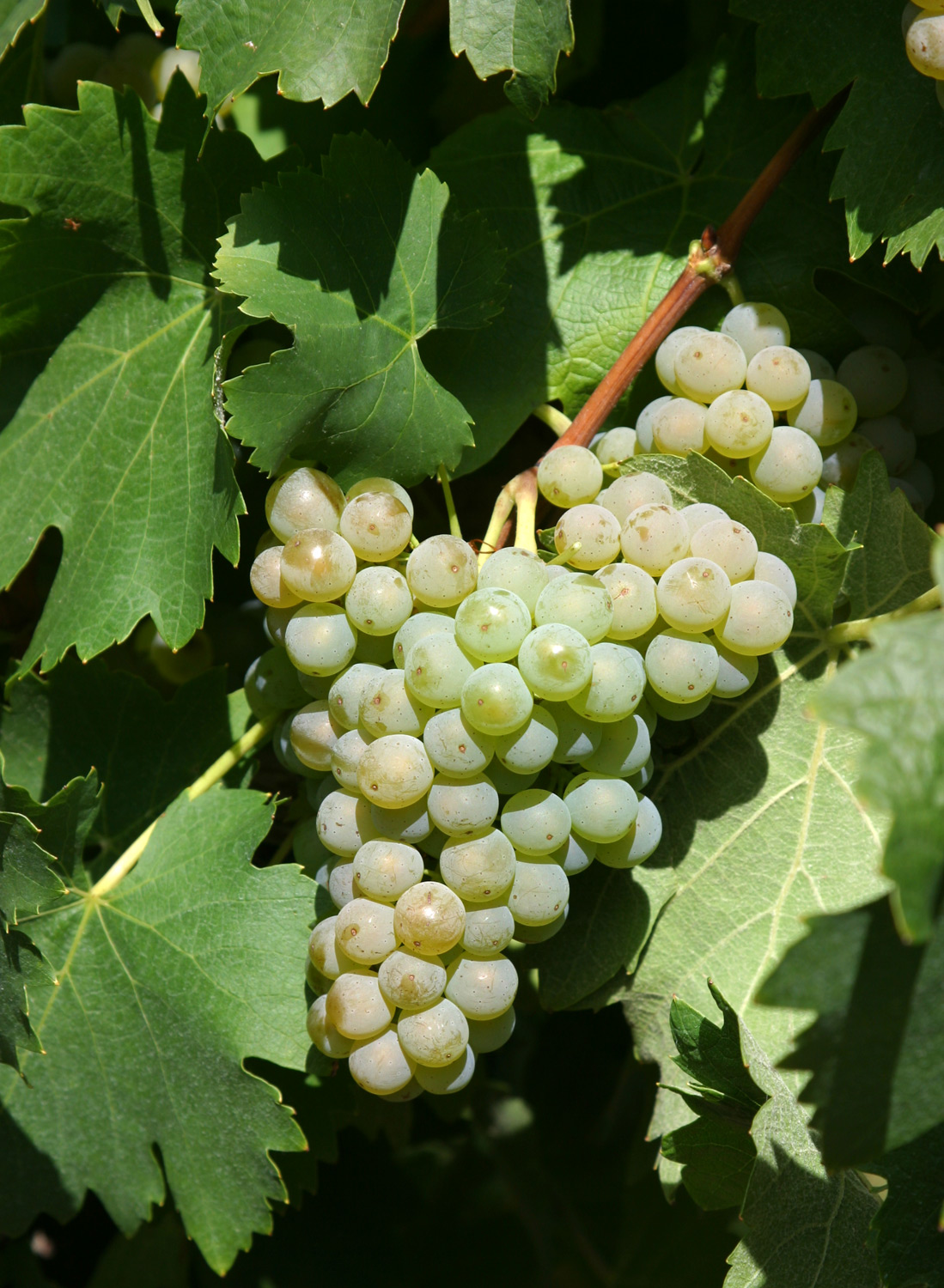
- Jewel grapes
- Color of berry skin: Blanc
- Species: Vitis vinifera
- Origin: Germany
- Notable regions: Rheinhessen
- VIVC number: 13212

Juwel is a white German wine grape variety that was produced in the mid-20th century as a crossing between Kerner and Silvaner. By the end of the 20th century, only around 30 hectares of the grapes were still in production, mostly found in the Rheinhessen.
