= Siebengebirge (Wine District) =

Wine district in Germany

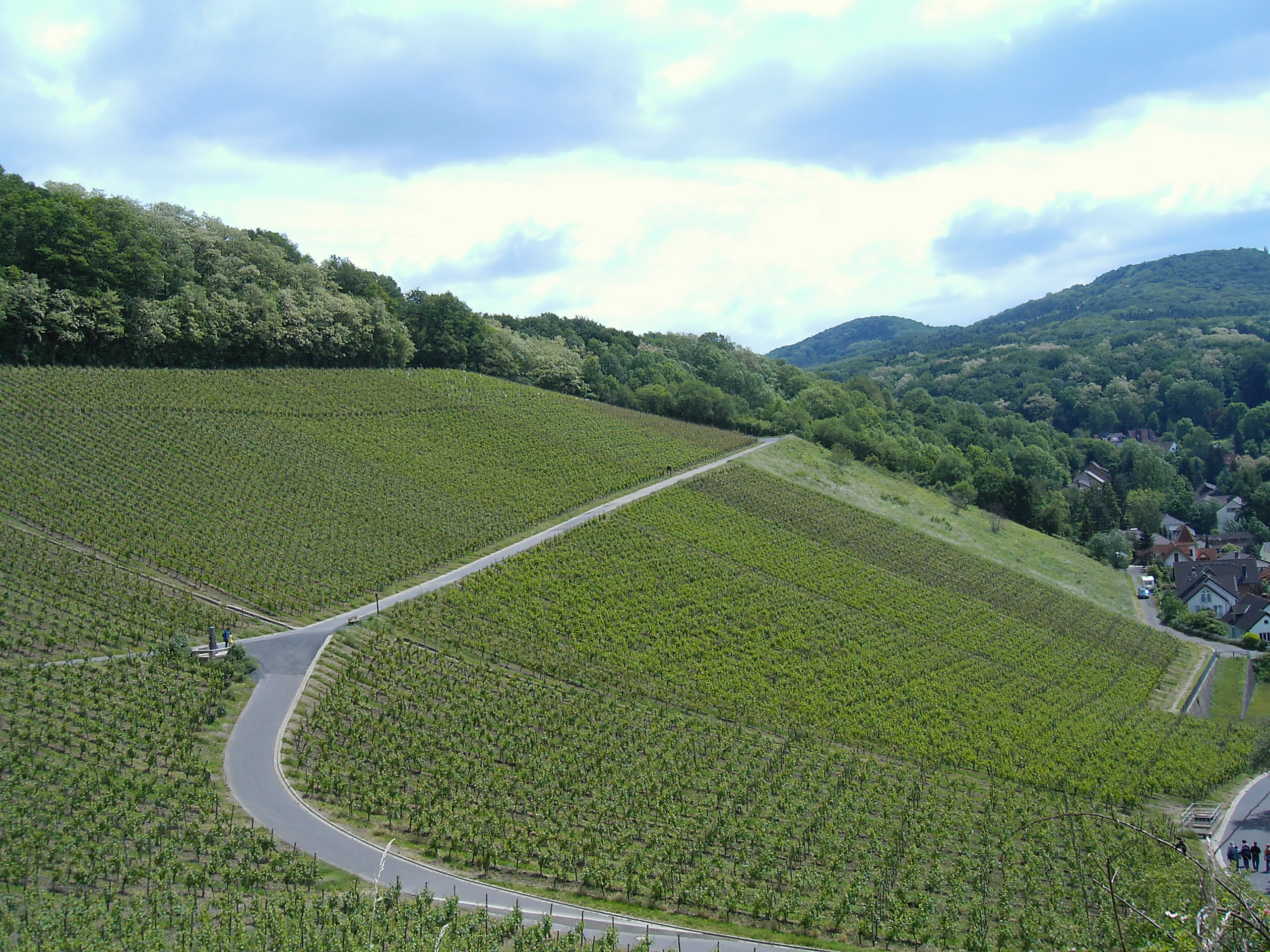
Vineyards on the Dollendorfer Hardt

The Siebengebirge wine growing district ("Bereich") is part of the Mittelrhein wine growing region and is made up entirely of the Petersberg site ("Großlage"). The district is named for the Siebengebirge mountain range, located within the municipal boundaries of Bad Honnef and Königswinter.

The acreage under cultivation once exceeded 500 hectares, of which today only about 20 hectares remain.

== Vineyards ==
The site comprises nine vineyards, located in the towns of Niederdollendorf and Oberdollendorf (part of the city of Königswinter), Königswinter proper, Rhöndorf (part of the city of Bad Honnef) and Beuel (part of the city of Bonn).

The vineyards of Sülzenberg, Laurentiusberg and Rosenhügel cover the western slope of the Dollendorfer Hardt hill on a soil made up of loam and loess on greywacke. The vineyards of Goldfüßchen, Heisterberg and Longenburgerberg in neighbouring Niederdollendorf have a sandy loam base.

The largest vineyards by far are on the slopes of the Drachenfels, with one vineyard located in Königswinter (to the south) and one in Rhöndorf (to the north). They are characterized by trachytic and stony clay soil. A small vineyard on the right bank of the Rhine has a gravel and sand loam soil.

The vineyards of Goldfüßchen and Longenburgerberg are currently not under cultivation. The Heisterberg vineyard which had been left idle since the 80's has only recently been re-cultivated. The Petersberg after which the site is named does not have any vineyards anymore although the Heisterberg vineyard is located on the Kellerberg which is generally considered as one of its foothills.

| Vineyard | Area | Elevation |
|---|---|---|
| Rosenhügel | 3 | 87–140 |
| Rheinaue | 1 | 50–60 |
| Laurentiusberg | 2 | 72–132 |
| Sülzenberg | 3 | 84–143 |
| Goldfüßchen | 1 | 74–134 |
| Longenburgerberg | 4 | 68–136 |
| Heisterberg | 2 | 78–136 |
| Drachenfels | 12 | 57–137 |
| Drachenfels | s.o. | 57–138 |
