= Caspar Joseph Brambach =

German musician, pedagogue and composer

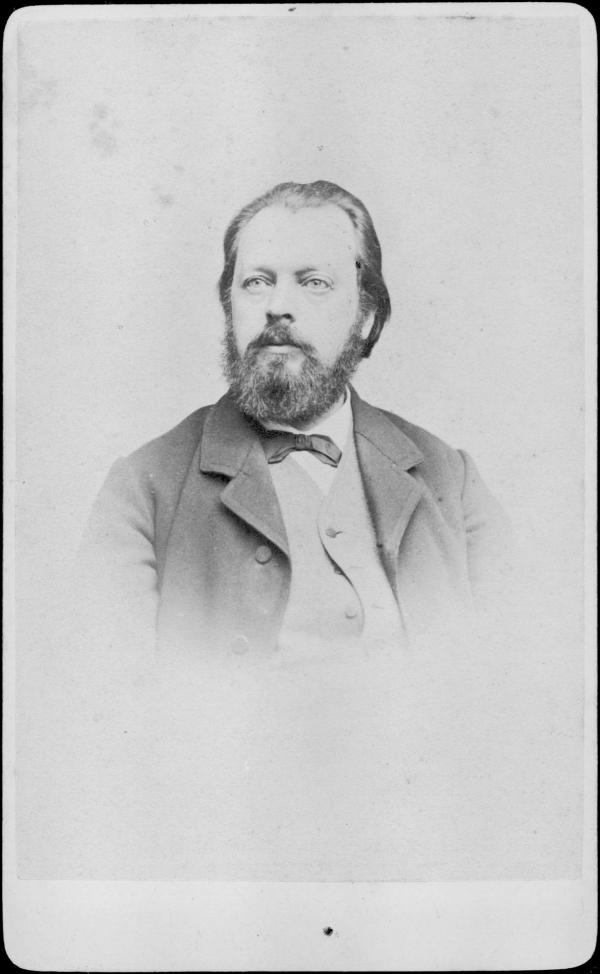
Caspar Joseph Brambach, ca. 1860

Caspar Joseph Brambach (14 July 1833 – 20 June 1902) was a 19th-century German musician, pedagogue and composer whose reputation extended beyond Germany to America, and a renowned conductor of the leading choirs in Bonn.

== Life ==
The son of organ builder, piano tuner and music teacher Franz Jacob Brambach, he was born in Oberdollendorf, a village across the river Rhine from Bonn. Brambach's mother, born Lückerath, was the daughter of a free-roving puppet master builder. His brother was German musicologist Wilhelm Brambach.

The young Caspar Joseph spent his first years in his native village, where he received his first music lessons from his father, which continued during elementary and high school in Bonn and at the Conservatory of Music, Cologne. Friedrich Nietzsche was once asked by Brambach for advice whether he should become a musician or a scholar. Choosing the former, Brambach followed his musical career as first violinist of the Bonn Opera House (1847–1850) and studied at the Cologne Conservatory (1851–1854), which promoted young composers and where he received awards for a string quartet and various songs for the Mozart scholarship at Frankfurt Liederkranz. Later he studied there as a private pupil of Ferdinand Hiller and Carl Reinecke before he himself became a teacher in 1858.

In 1861 he was appointed municipal music director in Bonn, where he led performances of oratorios by Bach, Haydn, Handel and other composers. He retired from this position in 1869 to devote himself entirely to his compositions and musical life in Bonn. (Note: The same year Brambach married Magdalena Gohr.) From 1862 to 1877 he conducted the men's choir "Concordia" and from 1861 to 1869 the Municipal Choral Society, now known as the Bonn Philharmonic Choir.

== Death ==
On 20 June 1902 Brambach died in his home in Bonn. His funeral was accompanied by singers from all over Germany. Two years after his death a memorial designed by the architect Karl Senff was built on his grave at the cemetery in Poppelsdorf. The relief on his elaborate tomb is signed by the Bad Honnef sculptor Charles Menser (1872–1929) and bears the inscription "Dedicated to German singers". (Note: Even 25 years after his death, Brambach was honoured by an American delegation headed by Mark P. Campbell on behalf of the Music Industries Chamber of Commerce at the Beethoven Festival in Bonn in 1927.) It is now a grave of honour, located under the Cross Mountain Church.

In the obituaries of his time, (Note: General Gazette, 21 June 1902, no. 4428.) the importance of Caspar Joseph Brambach as a musician and his work in the city of Bonn was highlighted. It was also added that he was one of the kindest and most unselfish people, whom no one would forget.

== Music ==
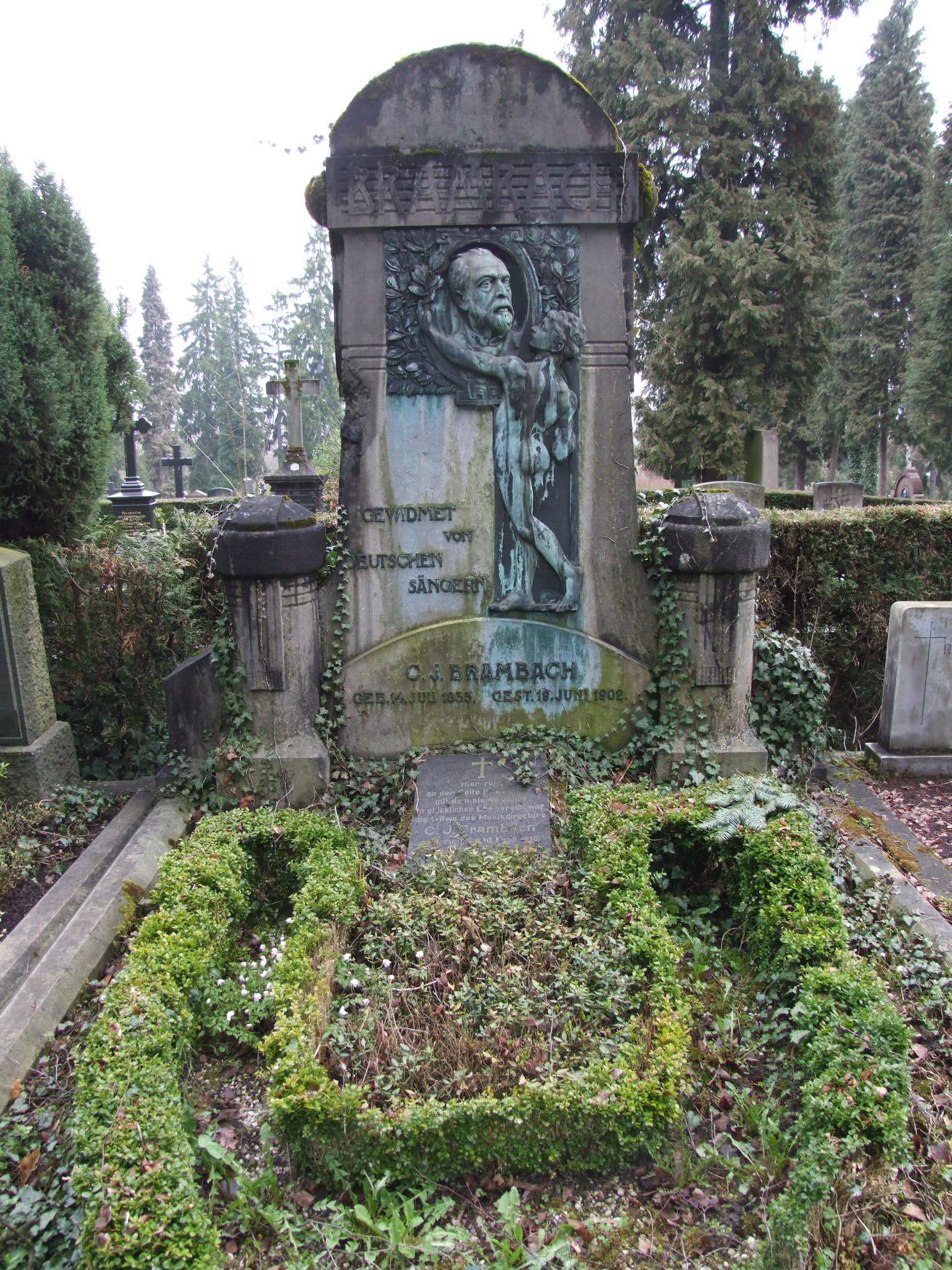
Brambach's grave stone inside Bonn's Poppelsdorf cemetery

From 1861 until his death Brambach was lauded as a performing musician always acclaimed by the masses, devoting himself entirely to work and the private training of young musicians. One of his most important pupils was Max von Schillings whom he taught for some time during his high school years, from 1879.

Brambach, whose works are almost forgotten today, was known primarily as a composer of works for male choir, besides writing numerous songs, among which the melody of the Bergisches Heimatlied resembles his best-known song. (Note: The text was by Rudolf Hartkopf (1859–1944).) Brambach's choral compositions were widely performed at festivals of the time (Leipzig, Munich, Vienna, etc.), sometimes even in the presence of the Prussian imperial family.

Brambach's musical style corresponds to the post-Mendelssohn era, with a very cantabile mood, which stands out from the majority of his contemporaries. Many admirers among musicians, conductors, the general public, and even Hans von Bülow, spoke highly not only of his most recognised work, but also of his Piano Concerto, Op. 39.

== Works ==
Brambach's best works are his cantatas The Eleusinian Festival, A Hymn to Spring, The Power of Prometheus, Lorelei and the choral work Columbus, which acquired recognition in the U.S. where he was awarded a prize. He also wrote the opera Ariadne and several minor pieces, which were very popular in his time. His best instrumental works date from the last third of the 19th century. Among them are:

- Sextet in C minor op. 5 (for 2 violins, 2 violas, cello and piano)
- Piano Quartet in E-flat major op. 14
- Piano Quartet in A minor op. 43
- Violin Sonata in D minor op. 55
- Violin Sonata in A minor op. 74
- Piano Quartet in G minor op. 110

== Notes and references ==
Notes

References

- Josef Niesen: Bonner Personenlexikon, 2nd edition (Bonn: Bouvier Verlag, 2008). (in German)
