= Carl Hasenpflug =

German painter (1802–1858)

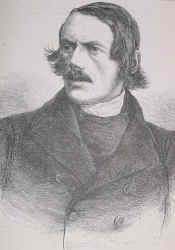

Carl Hasenpflug (1802–1858) was a German artist who specialized in landscape painting, primarily the rendering of architecture.

== Biography ==
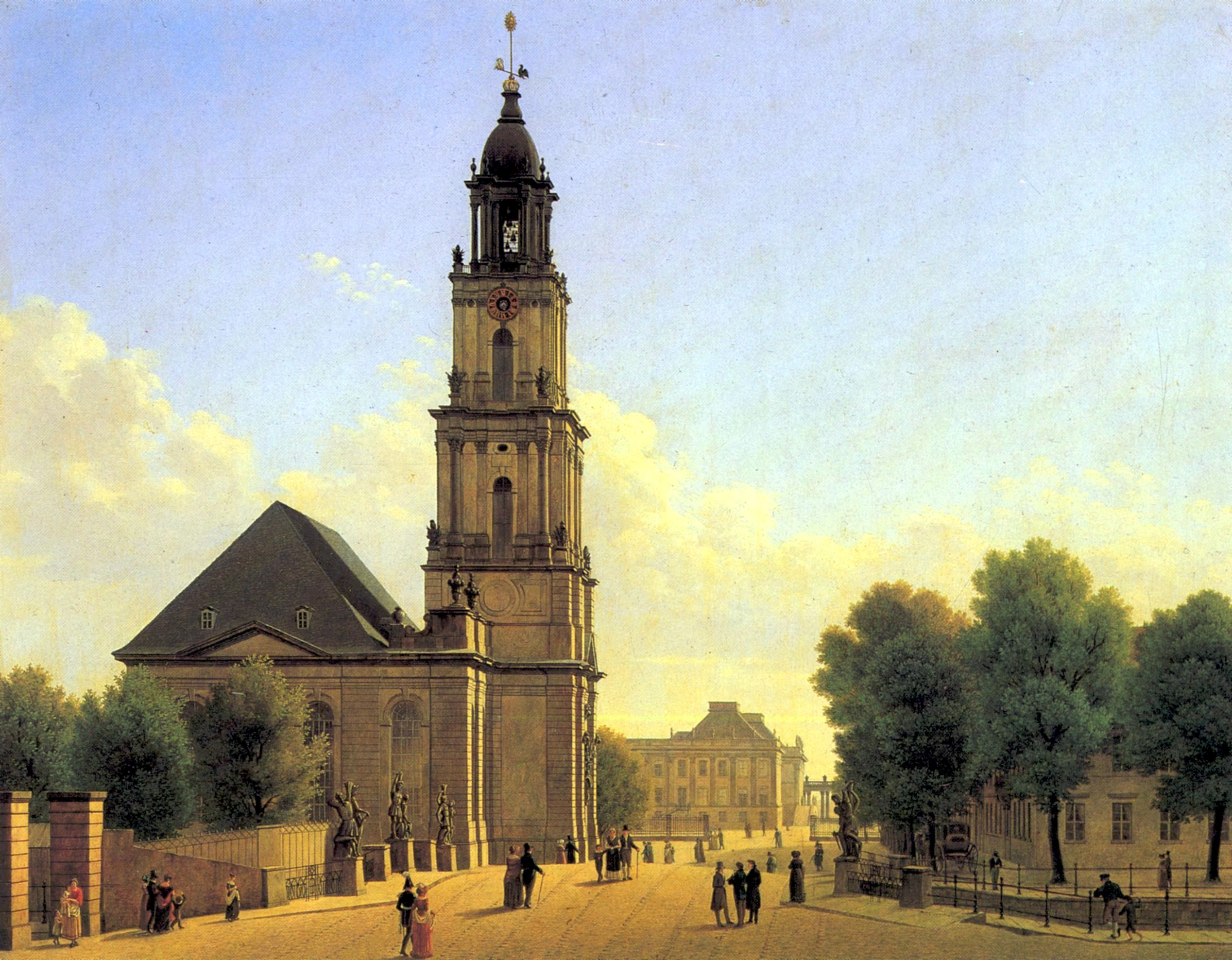
"View of the Garrison Church in Potsdam", 1827 (Stiftung Stadtmuseum Berlin)

Born in Berlin, Hasenpflug was first apprenticed as a shoemaker to his father, then to the decorative painter Carl Gropius. By 1822 he had become known as a painter of architectural subjects, with particular focus on the representation of medieval German churches, in which architectural details were first drawn in pen, then glazed over with oil paint. Favorite subjects included the cathedrals of Magdeburg and Halberstadt, where he lived from 1828.

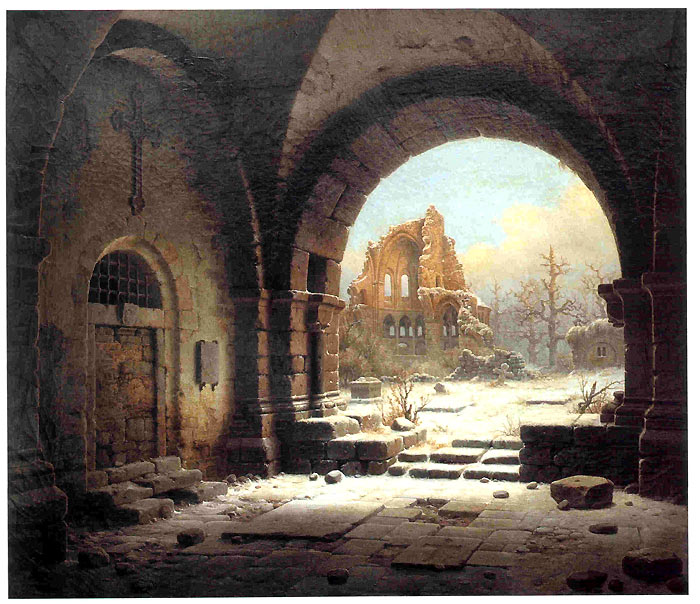
"Ruined Choir", c. 1840

After 1838 Hasenpflug concentrated on paintings of snow-covered ruins that combined factual observation with fantasy. "Snowdrifts in the Cloister of the Halberstadt Cathedral" (Städtisches Museum, Halberstadt), displays a more painterly manner than previous renderings, and evidences the artist's response not only to the subject's visual appeal, but also suggests the vulnerability of the medieval structure and the spiritual haven it represents. Other noted works include two views of Cologne Cathedral (1832–33), Erfurt Cathedral (1827), “Mediæval Castle Yard” (1842, Schwerin Gallery), and “Ruined Chapel” (Stettin Museum).

He died in Halberstadt in 1858.
