= Wilhelm Brambach =

German classical scholar, music historian and librarian

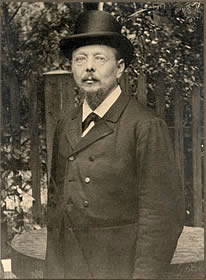
- Wilhelm Brambach, ca. 1900
- Born: 17 December 1841; Bonn, Germany
- Died: 26 February 1932 (aged 90); Karlsruhe, Germany
- Occupations: Professor, librarian

Wilhelm Brambach (17 December 1841 – 26 February 1932) was a German classical scholar, music historian, and librarian. He was the son of organ builder Franz Jacob Brachmann and the brother of composer and choral conductor Caspar Joseph Brambach. He studied classical philology with Friedrich Ritschl and musicology with Heinrich Breidenstein at the University of Bonn. He worked as a librarian at Bonn University from 1862 to 1866, after which he was appointed Chief Librarian at the University Library Freiburg in 1866, a position he held for the next 38 years. He also con-currently served as a full professor of philology at the University of Freiburg from 1868 until his retirement in 1904.
