= Mittelrhein (wine region) =

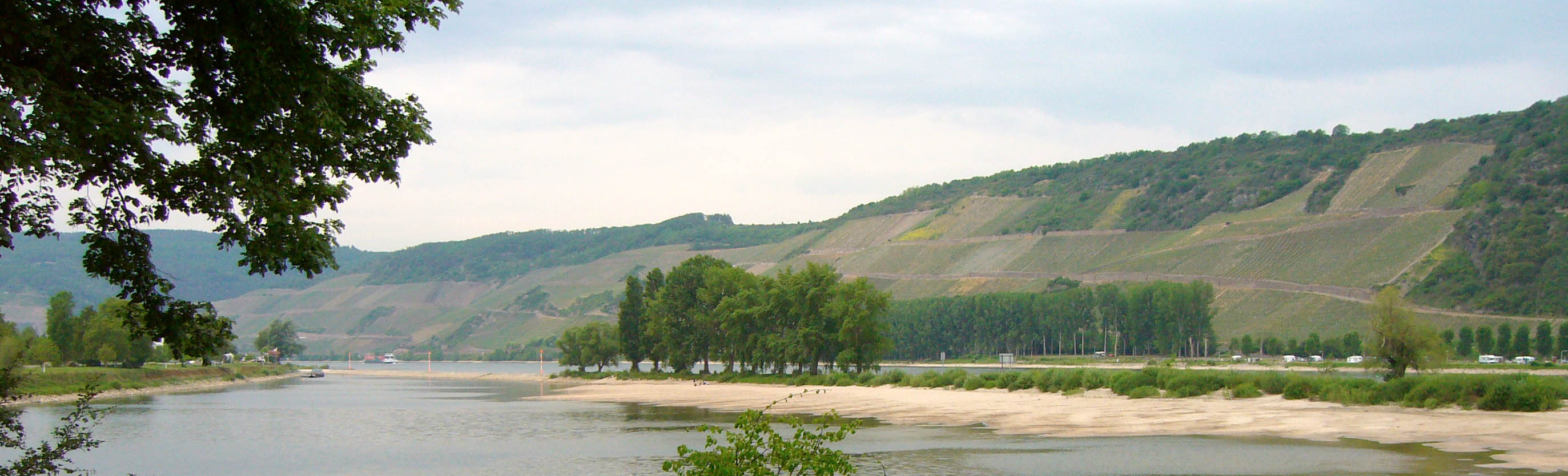
The vineyard site Bopparder Hamm in the Mittelrhein region, with river Rhine in the foreground.

Mittelrhein (or Middle Rhine) is a region (Anbaugebiet) for quality wine in Germany, and is located along a 120 km stretch of river Rhine in the tourist portions of the Rhine region known as Middle Rhine. On the left bank of Rhine, vineyards begin immediately downstream of the Nahe estuary and last until Koblenz. On the right bank, vineyards begin where Rheingau ends and last until 8 kilometers south of Bonn, in the Siebengebirge. Parts of the Rhine Gorge, a UNESCO World Heritage since 2002, make up the southern part of Mittelrhein.

The region's 448 hectares (1,110 acres) of vineyards (2013 situation) are dominated by white wine grapes (85%) to a higher extent than any other wine region of Germany with the exception of Mosel. With the much-appreciated Riesling being the most grown variety at 68% of the vineyards, and considering the vicinity to the world-famous regions Rheingau and Mosel, it could perhaps be expected that Mittlerhein would enjoy a commercial success. In reality, the situation is quite the opposite. In between 1989 and 2009 the Middle Rhine lost 36% of its total area of vines under cultivation, while the nationwide development shows a plus of 7.37% Since the region's planted area has been shrinking for quite some time, the region's wines are hardly ever seen on export markets, and seem to be rather unknown even inside Germany. The underlying reasons are manifold. The number of vineyards in the Middle Rhine region has steadily declined over the last hundred years due to the difficult and labor-intensive nature of steep-slope viticulture. While around 2,200 hectares were planted in 1900, there are currently only 448 hectares left. However, the situation has stabilized since the turn of the millennium.

The must per hectare comparison of German wine growing regions shows that in average, the Middle Rhine ranks 3rd lowest in output per hectare with an average of 68 hl / ha between 2001 and 2012. Only Saale-Unstrut (56 hl/ha) and Saxony (45 hl/ha) yield a lower output. The nationwide average over the same time frame comes up to 91 hl/ha. Hence, in a ten-year average, the Middle Rhine region only yields 75% of the nation's average hectolitre per hectare output. In 2012, the output per hectare was 59 hl / ha, hence even 13% less than the ten year average of the region and 35% less than the average national output for 2012. In 2013, there were greater difficulties for harvesting and production. The bad weather conditions throughout the year led to minimal output, especially for late ripening grapes like Riesling, by far the most grown variety. Many quality producers only harvested 30 hl / ha, and some producers less. Despite these low yields, the region's wines in the 2013 vintage were of a high quality, and prices remained stable and low.

From countless conversations to wine growers in and outside the area, the conclusions on the underlying reasons are various. On one side, the area is vulnerable to the climate conditions of the respective vintage year; on the other side, there is an ongoing trend to forfeit quantity for the sake of quality. The most hyped wineries all over the world get worked up on only selecting the best grapes by hand. Due to the region's geological conditions, this is usual practice on the Middle Rhine. The difference: Prices don't quadruple because of this fact.

== Geographical classification ==
Mittelrhein is divided into two districts ("Bereiche"), made up of eleven sites ("Großlagen") and 111 vineyards ("Einzellagen"). In the north, four villages which are situated in the federal state of North Rhine-Westphalia make up the district Siebengebirge, while the bulk of the vineyards, in the federal state of Rhineland-Palatinate, define the district Loreley. Vineyards are situated on both sides of the Rhine, with a few vineyards being situated on the banks of Lahn, a tributary of the Rhine.

From south to north, the districts and sites making up the region are:

District Loreley (Rhineland-Palatinate)

- Burg Reichenstein, centered on Oberheimbach
- Schloss Stahleck, centered on Bacharach
- Herrenberg, centered on Kaub
- Schloss Schönburg, centered on Oberwesel
- Loreleyfelsen, centered on Sankt Goarshausen
- Burg Rheinfels, centered on Sankt Goar
- Gedeonseck, centered on Boppard
- Marksburg, centered on Koblenz
- Lahntal, centered on Obernhof
- Burg Hammerstein, centered on Hammerstein

District Siebengebirge (North Rhine-Westphalia)

- Petersberg, centered on Königswinter

View a list of all the vineyards on the Middle Rhine.

== Grape varieties ==
Riesling ist the most cultivated variety (63,9 % of area), besides Spätburgunder (10,3 %), Weißburgunder (4,9 %) und Müller-Thurgau bzw. Rivaner (4,5 %).

Most cultivated grape varieties, by area in 2022
Variety	Colour	Synonym	Share (%)	Area (ha)
1. Riesling	weiß		63,9	298
2. Spätburgunder	rot	Pinot Noir	10,3	48
3. Weißer Burgunder	weiß	Pinot Blanc	4,9	23
4. Müller-Thurgau	weiß	Rivaner	4,5	21
