= Württemberg (wine region) =

Wine region in Germany

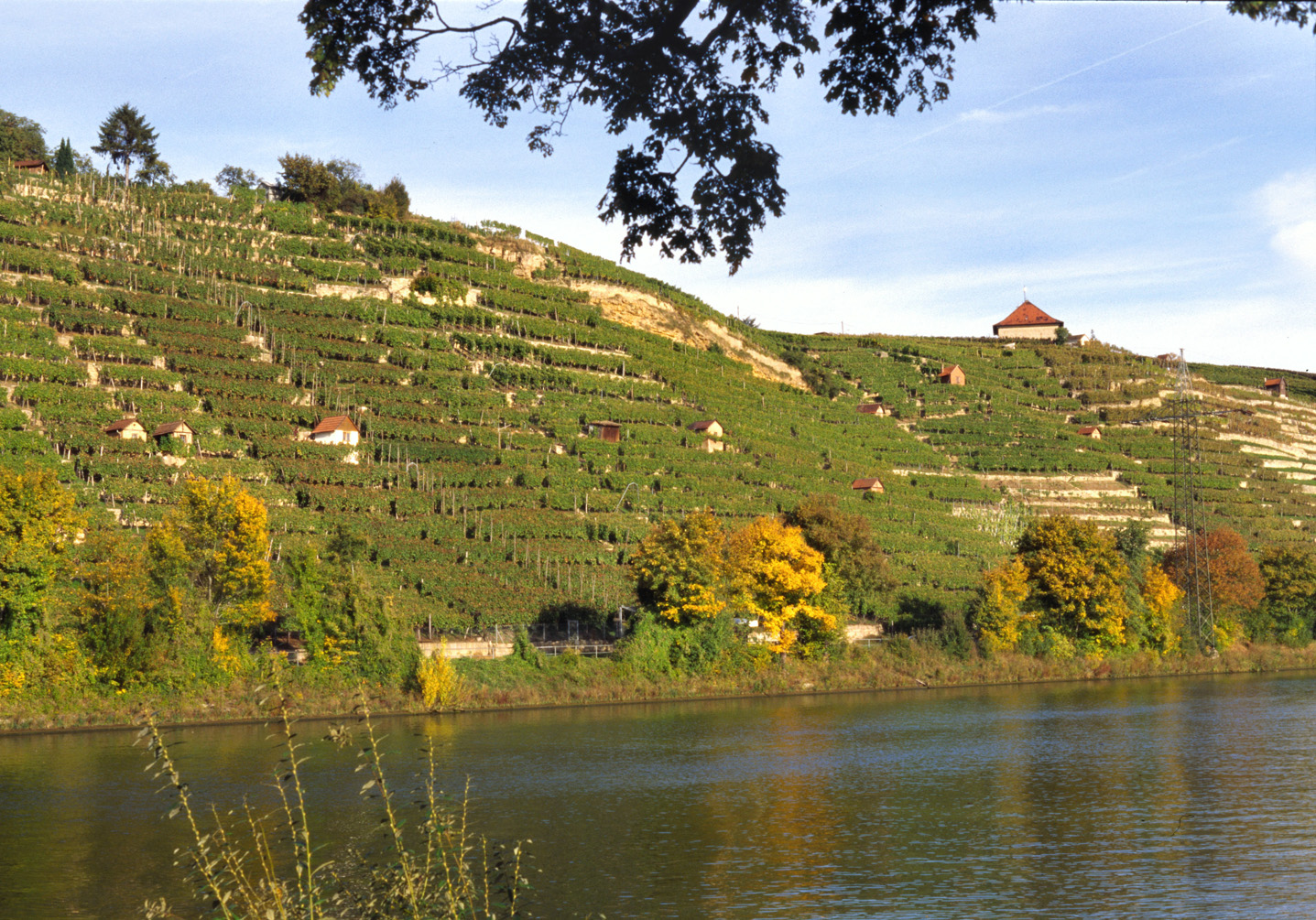
The vineyard Cannstatter Zuckerle is one of Württemberg's most well-known. It is situated in Bad Cannstatt, part of Stuttgart, and its steep terraced vineyards overlook river Neckar.

Württemberg is a region (Anbaugebiet) for quality wine in Germany, and is located in the historical region of Württemberg in southwestern Germany, which today forms part of the federal state of Baden-Württemberg. Under German wine legislation, Württemberg and Baden are separate wine regions.

With 11,511 hectares (28,440 acres) under vine in 2008, Württemberg is Germany's fourth largest wine region. Winemaking cooperatives are very common in Württemberg, number around 70, and are responsible for almost 75% of the region's production. Unlike most other German regions, Württemberg has a long history of producing red wines, although from somewhat different varieties than other German wine regions.

== Geography ==
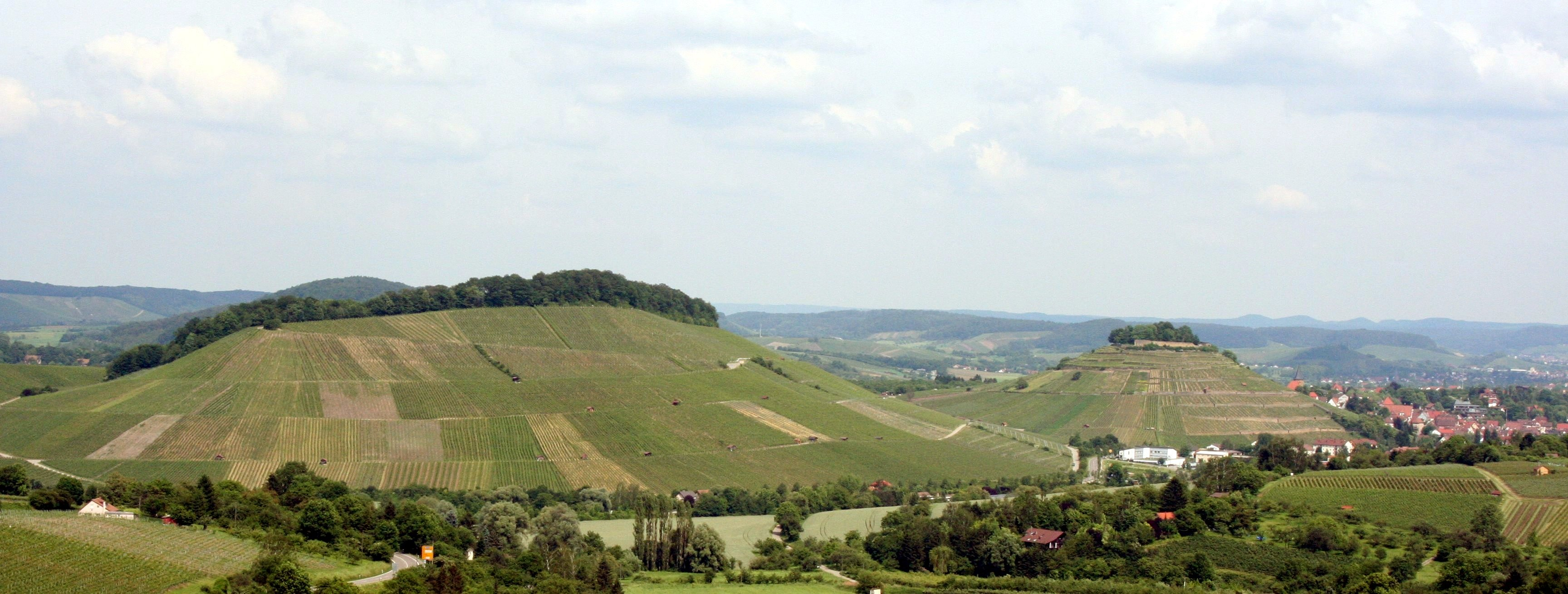
Vineyards Schemelsberg and Burgberg, situated on hills in the village Weinsberg close to Heilbronn

Most of the Württemberg wine region is situated around the river Neckar and several of its tributaries, Rems, Enz, Kocher and Jagst. The geography of the wine region is dominated by these river valleys and include several south-facing slopes. The main part of Württemberg is situated between the cities of Stuttgart and Heilbronn. There are also vineyards on Lake Constance that belong to Württemberg.

== Grape varieties ==
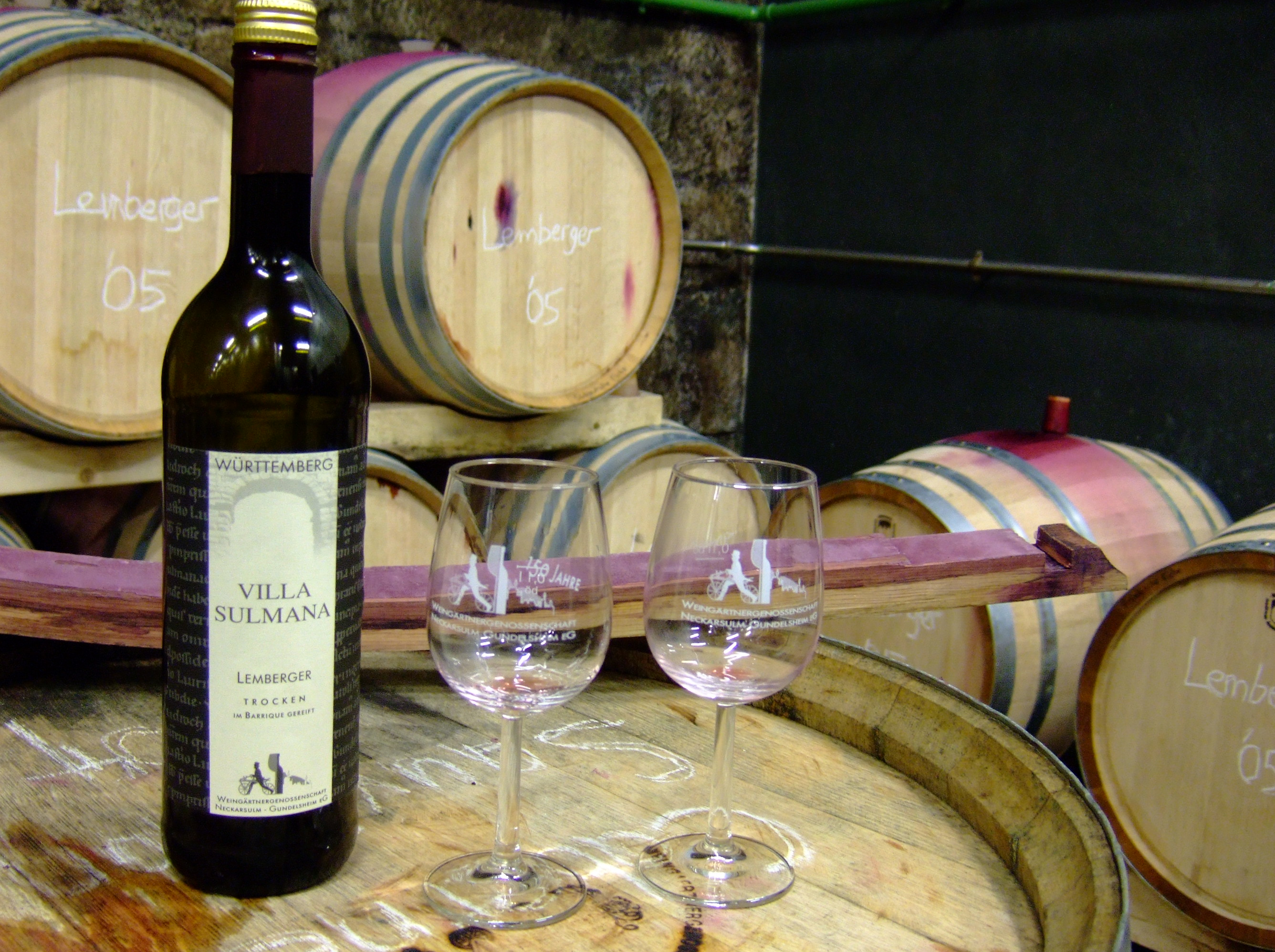
A bottle of Lemberger varietal wine from Württemberg

71% of the vines grown in Württemberg are of red grape varieties. The most common variety in Württemberg, and the region's signature grape, is the red wine grape Trollinger, which was planted on 21.2% of the vineyard surface in 2008. Trollinger gives red wines which are light in both colour and style (and occasionally made in a slightly sweet style) and Württemberg accounts for over 98% of plantings of Trollinger in Germany. Other common red varieties are Schwarzriesling (Pinot Meunier, which despite its German name is not related to "genuine" Riesling) at 15.1%, Lemberger (same as Austria's Blaufränkisch) at 13.9% and Spätburgunder (Pinot noir) at 11.1%. The most common white variety is Riesling (18.1%).

Leading grape varieties in Württemberg (date 2022)
Variety	colour	synonym	cultivated area (%)	cultivated area (ha)
1. Riesling	white		18,7	2134
2. Trollinger	red		16,7	1908
3. Blaufränkisch	red	Lemberger	15,5	1769
4. Spätburgunder (Pinot Noir)	red	Pinot noir	11,5	1309
5. Schwarzriesling (Pinot Meunier)	red	Pinot Meunier	10,5	1201
