= Kuhlmann =

Kuhlmann is a German surname and may refer to:

- Brigitte Kuhlmann (1947–1976), German terrorist
- Charles Frédéric Kuhlmann, French chemist and entrepreneur
- Eugène Kuhlmann, French viniculturist and developer of the Marechal Joffre hybrid grape
- Hank Kuhlmann, American football coach
- Helmut Kuhlmann (1944-2022), German politician
- Herbert Kuhlmann (1915–1985), German army officer
- João Geraldo Kuhlmann (1882–1958), Brazilian botanist
- Katharina Kuhlmann (b. 1977), German model
- Keith Kuhlmann, Australian rules footballer
- Mark Kuhlmann (b. 1969), German rugby union international
- Moysés Kuhlmann (1906–1972), Brazilian botanist
- Pete Namlook (born Peter Kuhlmann, 1960), German ambient musician
- Quirinus Kuhlmann (1651–1689), German poet
- Rosemary Kuhlmann (1922–2019), American singer
- Wolfgang Kuhlmann (1939–2025), German philosopher

== See also ==
- Cullmann, a surname
- Kehlmann, a surname
- Kohlmann, a surname
- Kuhlman, a surname
- Kullmann, a surname
- Kuhlemann
- Richard von Kühlmann (1873–1948), German diplomat and industrialist
- Knut von Kühlmann-Stumm (1916–1977), German politician
