= Kuhlmann (disambiguation) =

Kuhlmann is a German surname.

Kuhlmann can also refer to:

- Kuhlmann 187-1, a synonym of the hybrid grape Marechal Joffre
- Lucie Kuhlmann, a hybrid grape; see Marechal Joffre

== See also ==
- Cullmann, a surname
- Kehlmann, a surname
- Kuhlman, a surname
- Kullmann, a surname
- Richard von Kühlmann (1873–1948), German diplomat and industrialist
