= Kullman =

Kullman, or Kulman, is a surname. Notable people with the surname include:

- Arnie Kullman (1927–1999), Canadian ice hockey player
- Charles Kullman (1903–1983), American opera singer
- Ed Kullman (1923–1997), Canadian ice hockey player
- Elisabeth Kulman (born 1973), Austrian classical singer
- Ellen J. Kullman (born 1956), American chief executive
- Leen Kullman (1910–1943), Soviet military intelligence agent

== See also ==
- Cullman (disambiguation)
- Kullmann, a surname
