= Killman =

Killman or Kilman may refer to:

- Killman Zoo, located in Haldimand County, Ontario, Canada

== People with the surname ==
- Bill Thomas Killman or Dennis Rader (born 1945), American serial killer
- Gustaf Kilman (1882–1946), Swedish Army officer and horse rider
- Mary Killman (born 1991), American synchronized swimmer
- Max Kilman (born 1997), English footballer
- Sato Kilman (born 1957), Vanuatuan politician

=== Characters ===
- Amanda Killman, a character in the American animated TV series Bunsen Is a Beast

== See also ==
- Kihlman
