= Marechal Foch (grape) =

Variety of grape

- Grape (Vitis)
- Ripe clusters of Marechal Foch on the vine
- Color of berry skin: Rouge
- Species: Vitis hybrid
- Also called: Foch, Kuhlmann 188-2, Marshal Foch and Marshal Fosh
- Origin: France
- VIVC number: 7388

Maréchal Foch (French pronunciation: [maʁeʃal fɔʃ]) is an inter-specific hybrid French red wine grape variety. It was developed at the Oberlin Institute in Colmar-Alsace, at the beginning of the 20th century, then known as Kuhlmann 188-2, by Eugène Kuhlmann. The variety arrived in the U.S. in 1946, where it was subsequently renamed Marechal Foch in honor of Marshal Ferdinand Foch, Supreme Allied Commander during the First World War. Some believe it to be a cross of Goldriesling (itself an intra-specific cross of Riesling and Courtiller Musqué) with a Vitis riparia - Vitis rupestris cross. Others contend that its pedigree is uncertain and may contain the grape variety Oberlin 595. It ripens early, is cold-hardy and resistant to fungal diseases. It is a teinturier, with pigmented juice as well as skins. The berry size is small, which makes it prone to bird injury. The quality of wine produced by Marechal Foch vines is highly dependent upon vine age, and the flavor profile associated with many new-world hybrid varietals is much reduced in examples made with fruit picked from older vines.

== Wine regions ==
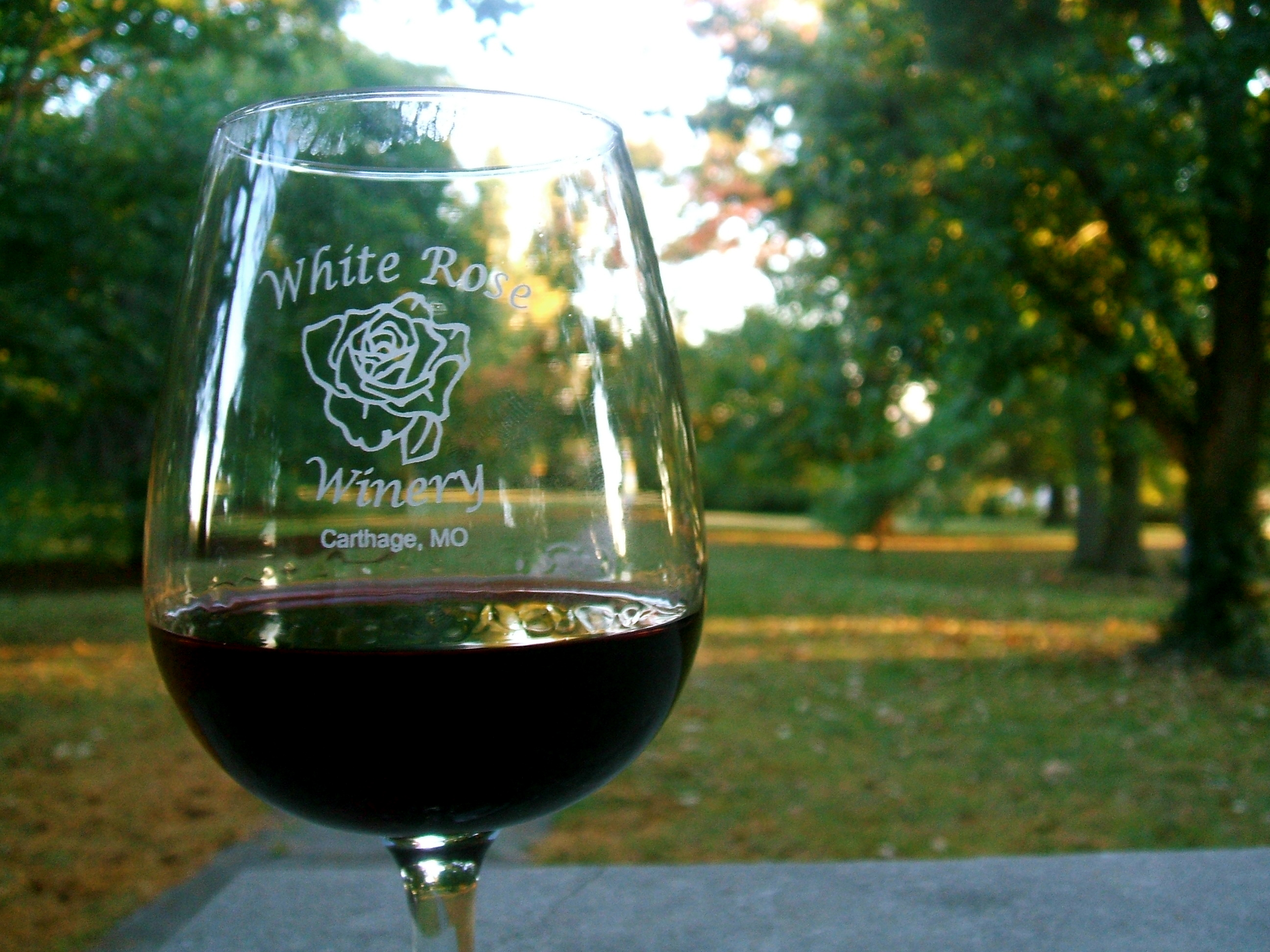
A Marechal Foch wine from Missouri.

Marechal Foch was formerly commonly grown in the Loire, but today it is limited to a small number of hectares in Europe. Because it is a hybrid variety, cultivation for commercial wines in Europe is restricted by European Union regulation.

It is more extensively grown in North America, including southern Ontario, Quebec, and Nova Scotia, as well as the eastern wine growing regions of the United States, where it ripens fully by the end of September. It is also commonly grown in Minnesota and Ohio. In the west, it is grown in Colorado in Delta County. Additionally, it is grown in Oregon's Willamette Valley, Missoula, Montana and Canada's Okanagan Valley and Comox Valley. Marechal Foch was introduced to Canadian vineyards in 1946 by Adhemar de Chaunac of Brights' wines, along with several other French hybrids.

However, the extent to which Marechal Foch is grown in Canada has been much reduced, due to an extensive vine-pull program in the early 1980s designed to replace hybrids with (Vitis vinifera) cultivars.

== Wines ==
Marechal Foch is used to make a variety of styles of wine, ranging from a light red wine similar to Beaujolais to more extracted wines with intense dark "inky" purple colour and unique varietal character, and even sweet, fortified, Port-like wines. Wines made from Marechal Foch tend to have strong acidity, aromas of black fruits and, in some cases, toasted wheat, mocha, fresh coffee, bitter chocolate, vanilla bean, and musk. In the darker variants of the wine a strong gamey nose is also often described. Highly extracted, and more carefully produced wines made from older plantings of Marechal Foch have recently been successfully marketed as more expensive niche wines with a dedicated following.

== Related varieties ==
The grape varieties Léon Millot, Lucie Kuhlman, and Marechal Foch came out of the same crossing, and are therefore related.

== Synonyms ==
Foch, Kuhlmann 188.2, Marschall Foch

== See also ==
- List of grape varieties
- Marechal Joffre
