= Kehlmann =

Kehlmann is a German surname. Notable people with the surname include:

- Daniel Kehlmann (born 1975), Austrian/German author
- Michael Kehlmann (1927–2005), Austrian film and theatre director, screenwriter and actor
- Robert Kehlmann (born 1942) artist and writer

== See also ==
- Cullman (disambiguation)
- Cullmann, a surname
- Kuhlman, a surname
- Kuhlmann (disambiguation)
- Kullmann, a surname
