= Adhémar de Chaunac =

Arms of the Chaunac-Lanzac family

Vicomte Fernand Adhémar Ferdinand Antoine de Chaunac de Lanzac (5 September 1896 – 12 November 1972) was a French-born Canadian wine pioneer who helped lay the groundwork for a successful wine industry in Ontario and other eastern North American wine regions.

He was born in 1896 in Montfaucon, Lot, France, into an ancient aristocratic family, the son of Bernard de Chaunac-Lanzac and Marguerite Bibonnet. His family immigrated to Canada in 1907. He temporarily returned to France to serve in the French army during World War I between 1915 and 1919. He was captured in 1915 but escaped, and was later awarded the Croix de Guerre and the Medaille des Evades.

Trained as a chemist, and having worked in the dairy and yeast industries, he was hired as the chief chemist at Brights Wines in 1933. Promoted to director of research in 1944, he served in this capacity until he retired in 1961. Alongside viticulturalist George Hostetter, he was to have a major impact on the long-term prospects of the North American wine industry.

In 1946, de Chaunac was responsible for the introduction to Canada of 35 French hybrid grapevines. Prior to the use of these varieties, wines in eastern North America were typically made with "foxy" native North American varieties like Concord or Niagara. The use of French hybrid varieties allowed for a more neutral flavour profile for wine production while still providing tolerances to climatic, soil, and disease conditions that had made the use of traditional Vitis vinifera varieties impossible in North American viticulture at that time.

It was de Chaunac, along with John Paroshy who first tested the use of Vidal blanc for the production of ice wine. Vidal is now the most common ice-wine grape in Ontario, producing ice wines which are a successful export product and routinely win international competitions.

Marechal Foch (Kuhlmann 188-2), De Chaunac (Seibel 9549), Baco noir, and Leon Millot are some of the successful hybrids introduced by de Chaunac. While Vitis vinifera varieties have ultimately supplanted the majority of French hybrid plantings in eastern North America, hundreds of hectares remain in production, some even used to produce "cult wines" from old vine plantings.

The De Chaunac (Seibel 9549) grape variety, still grown in some northeastern wine regions, was named after Adhémar de Chaunac.

He died in 1972 in Niagara Falls, Ontario.
