= Saxony (wine region) =

Wine region in Germany

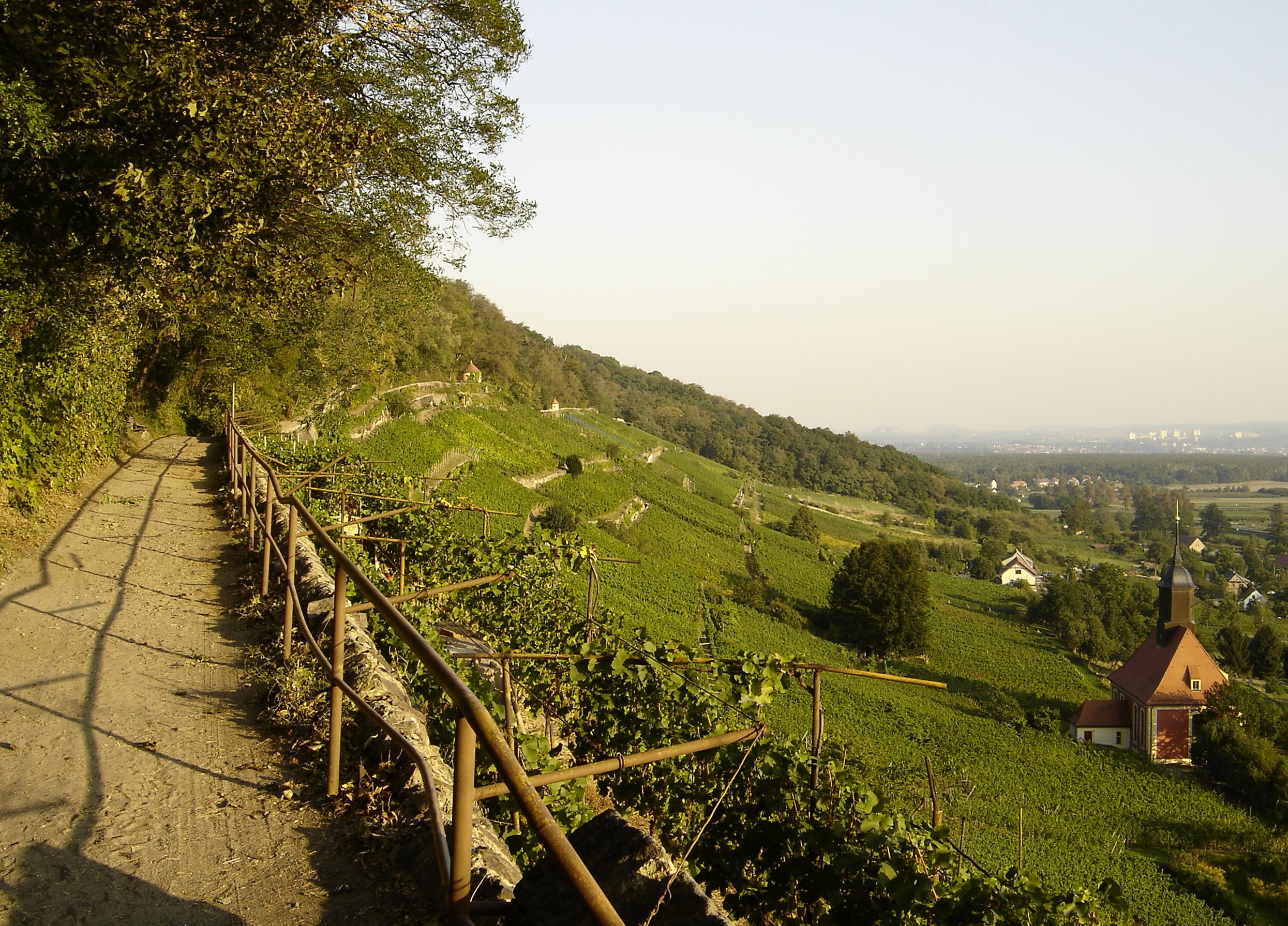
A footpath through vineyards in the village Pillnitz in Saxony

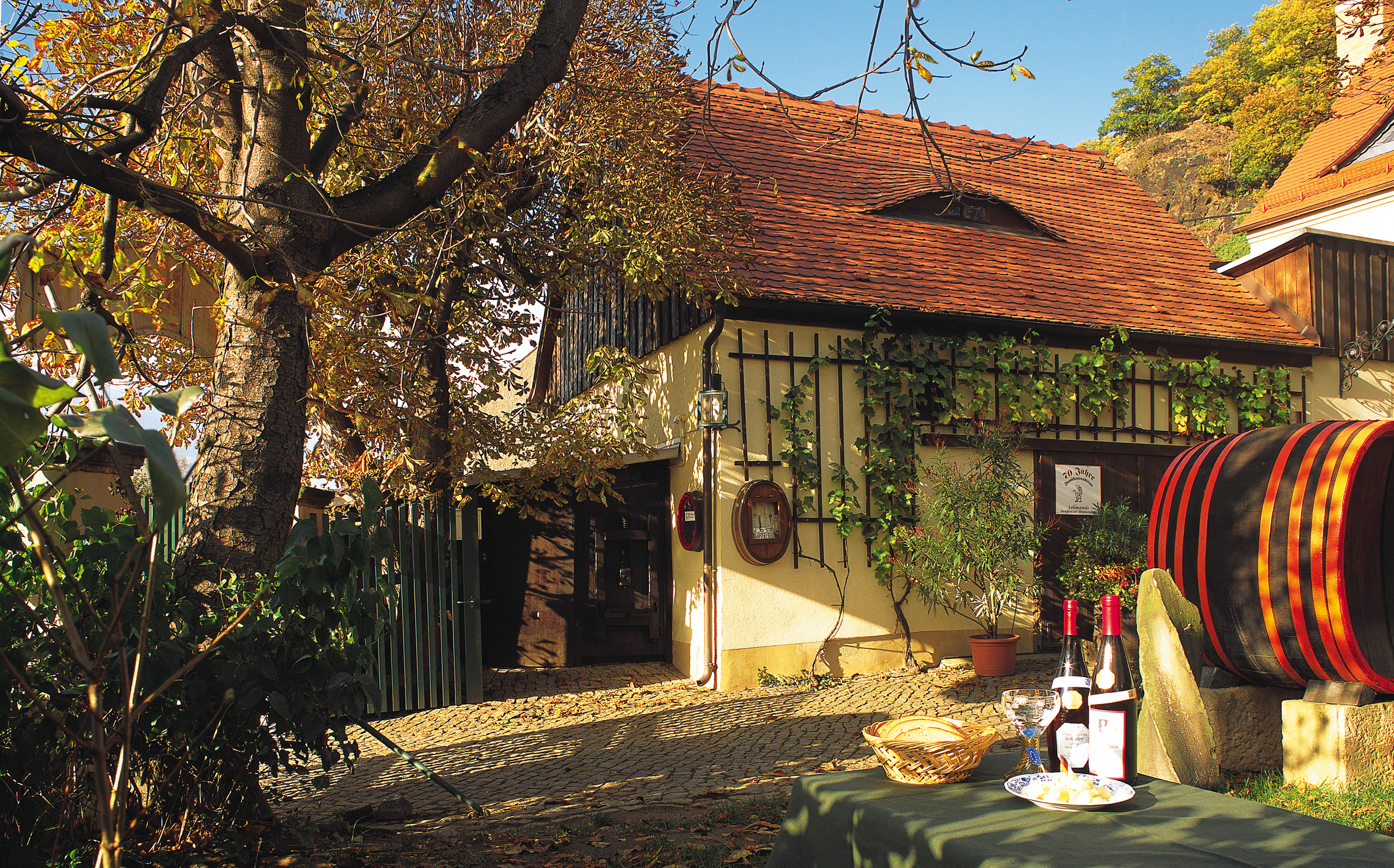
A winery in Saxony

Saxony (Sachsen) is a region for quality wine in Germany located in the German federal state of Saxony. The region is sometimes referred to colloquially as the Elbtal (Elbe valley). The wine region covers 462 hectares (1,140 acres), which makes it Germany's third smallest region, just ahead of Mittelrhein and Hessische Bergstraße in size. It is situated along the Elbe river from the Pillnitz section of Dresden to the village of Diesbar-Seußlitz located north of Meissen. Together with the Saale-Unstrut wine region, Saxony is one of the northernmost wine regions in Europe and are the only two of Germany's 13 wine regions that are located in the former East Germany. After German reunification in 1990, the vineyard surface was expanded from 200 to 450 hectares with European Union subsidies, but in recent years the vineyard area has decreased.

== History ==
The area of Saxony has a long winemaking tradition with evidence of viticulture in the region dating as far back as 1161 in Meissen.

== Climate and geography ==
Located in southeastern Germany near the border with the Czech Republic, the region has a continental climate that is tempered somewhat by the Elbe. The granite and gneiss based soils of the area are similar to the Austrian Wachau wine region.

== Grapes and wine ==
The Müller-Thurgau grape is the leading planting of the area at 85 hectares (210 acres) and 18.4% (2008 figures) followed by Riesling at 14.5% and Weissburgunder (Pinot blanc) at 11.9%. The majority of the wine production, around 90%, is in dry wine.

The most cultivated grape varieties, by area in 2008, were:

- Müller-Thurgau, 85 ha (18.4%)
- Riesling, 67 ha (14.5%)
- Weißer Burgunder, 55 ha (11.9%)
- Grauer Burgunder, 43 ha (9.3%)
- Spätburgunder, 38 ha (8.2%)
- Roter Traminer, 29 ha (6.3%)
- Kerner, 27 ha (5.8%)
- Dornfelder, 23 ha (5.0%)
- Goldriesling, 17 ha (3.7%)
- Scheurebe, 15 ha (3.2%)

== Impressions ==
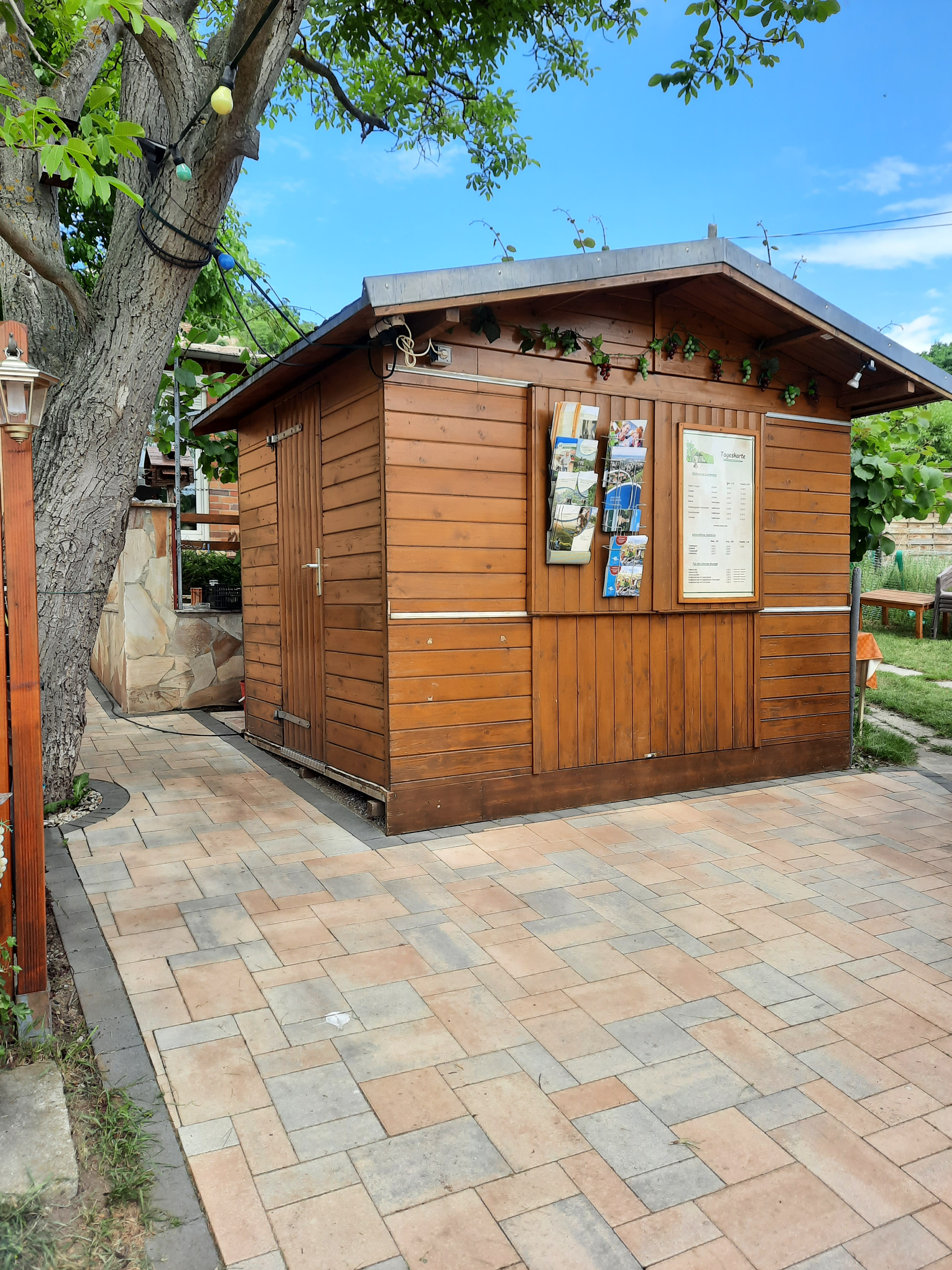
Wine shop out of season

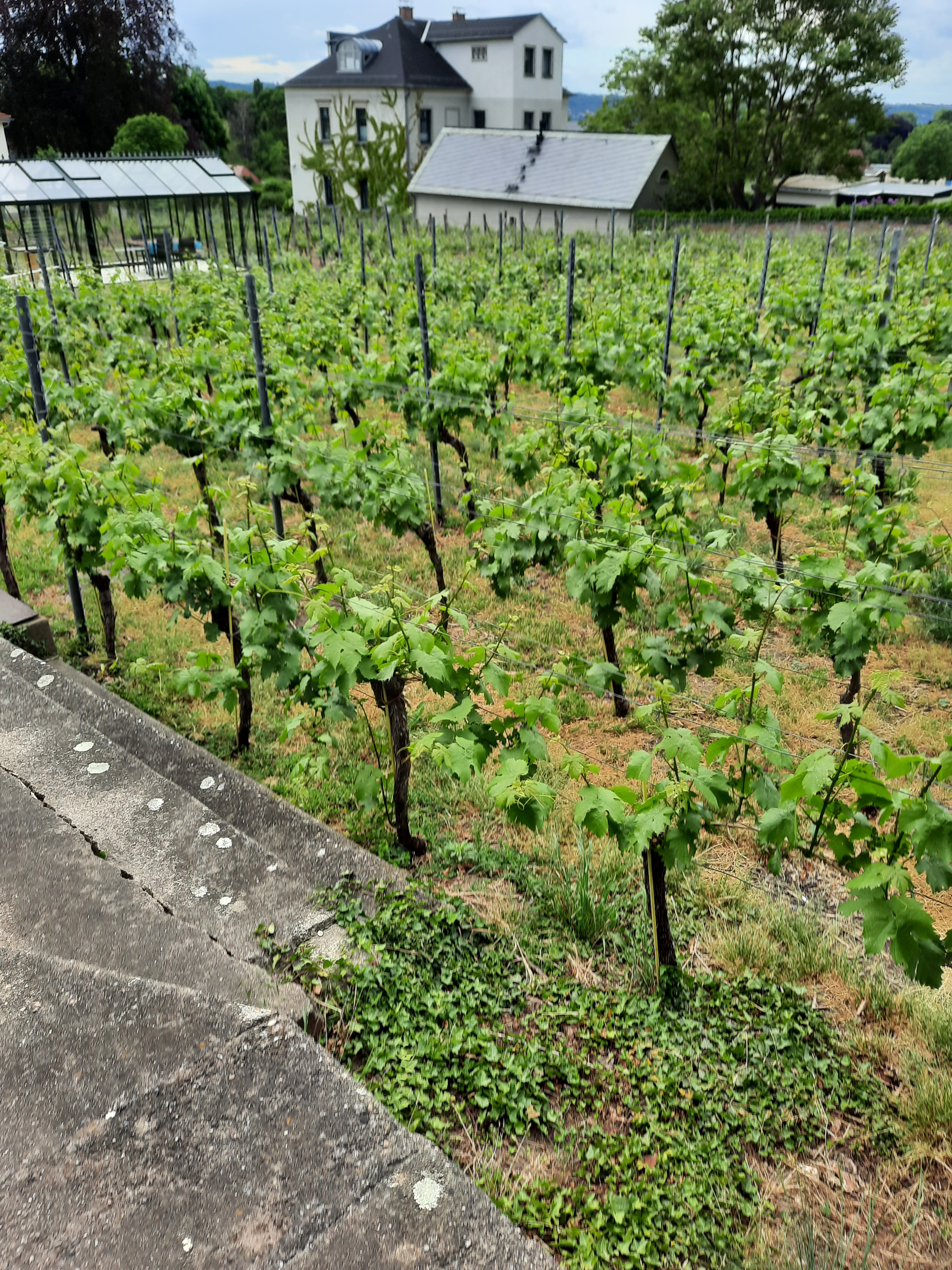
Young vines

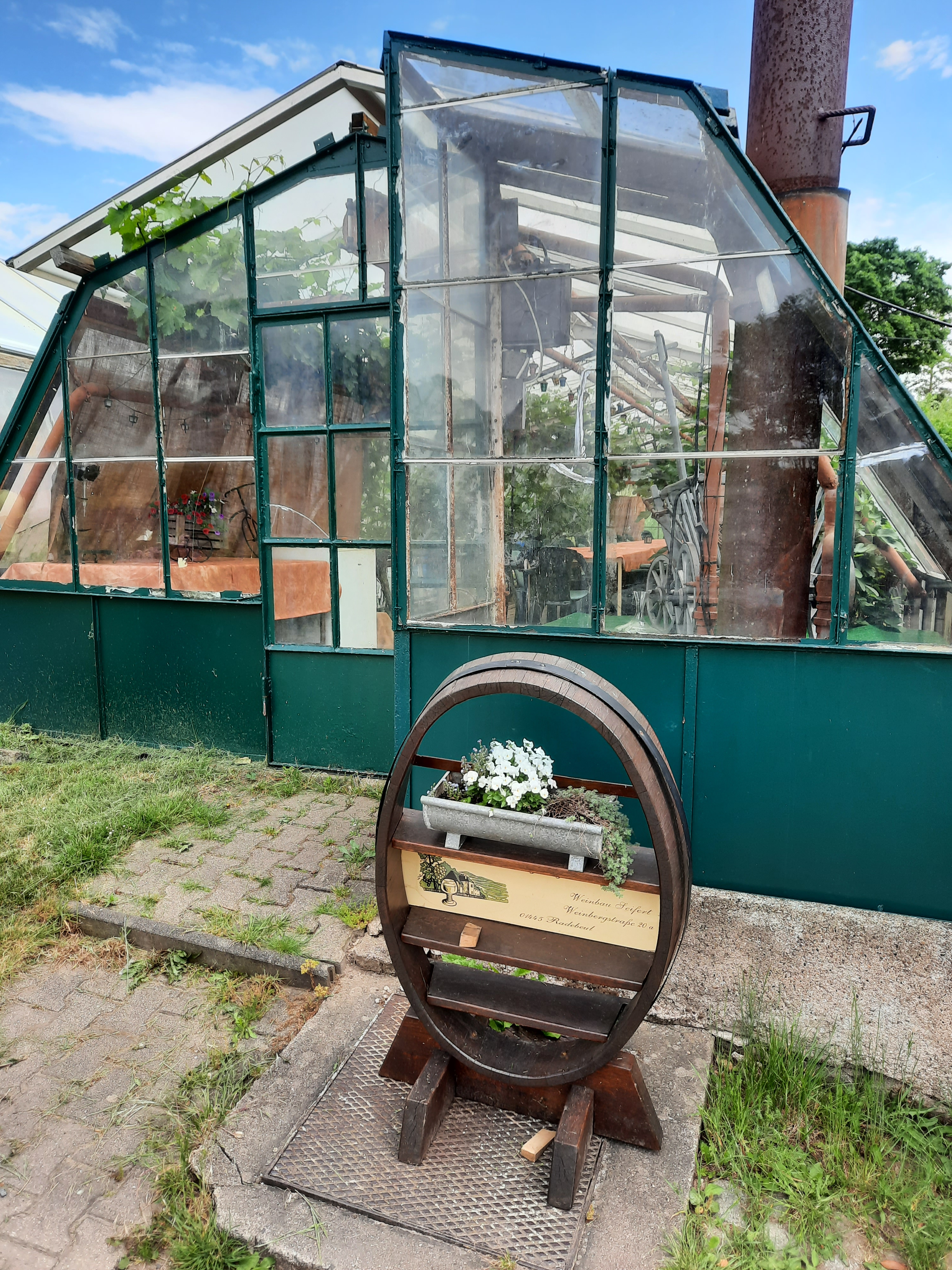
Old green house now used to serve wine

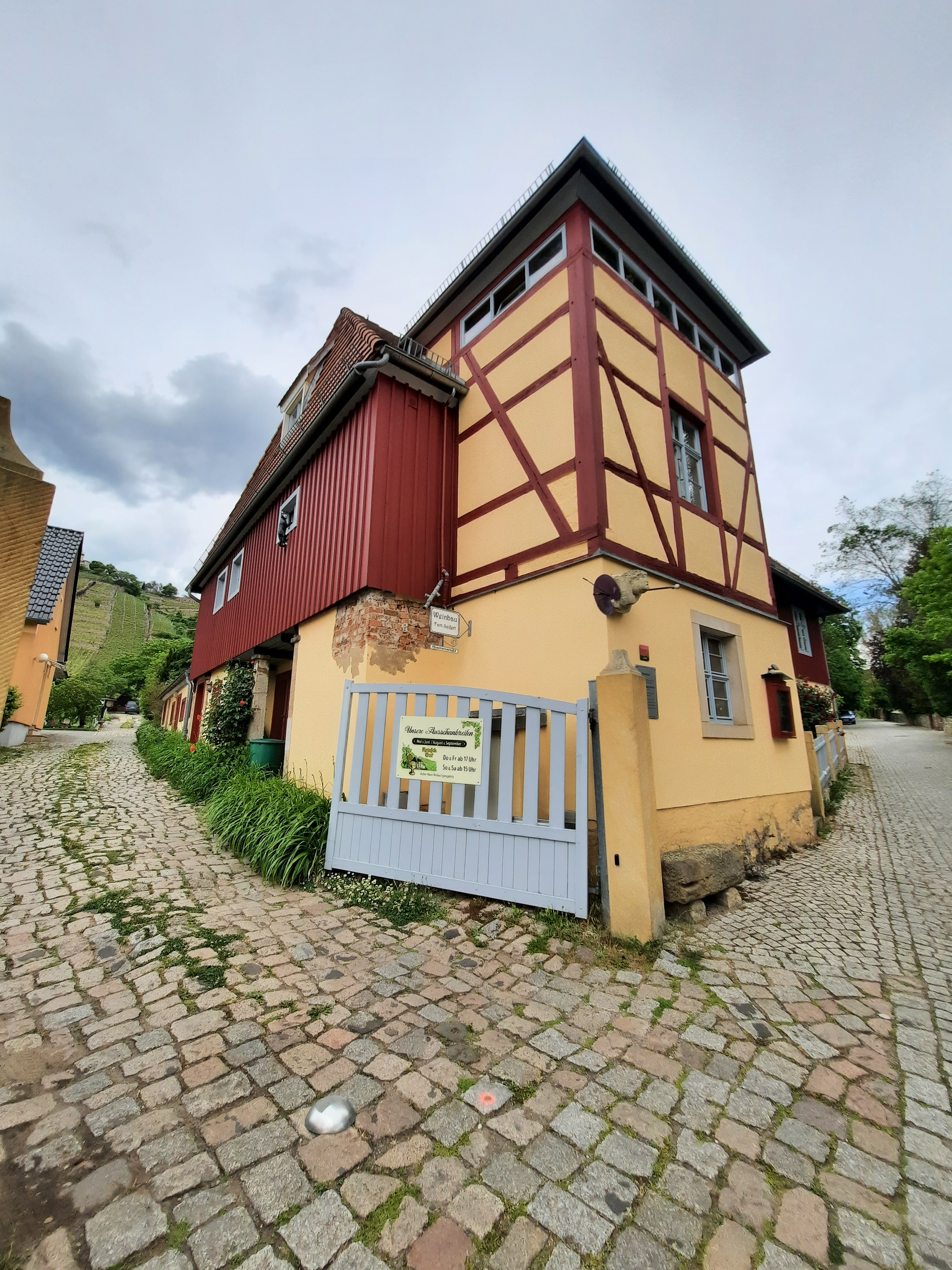
Entry to a winery

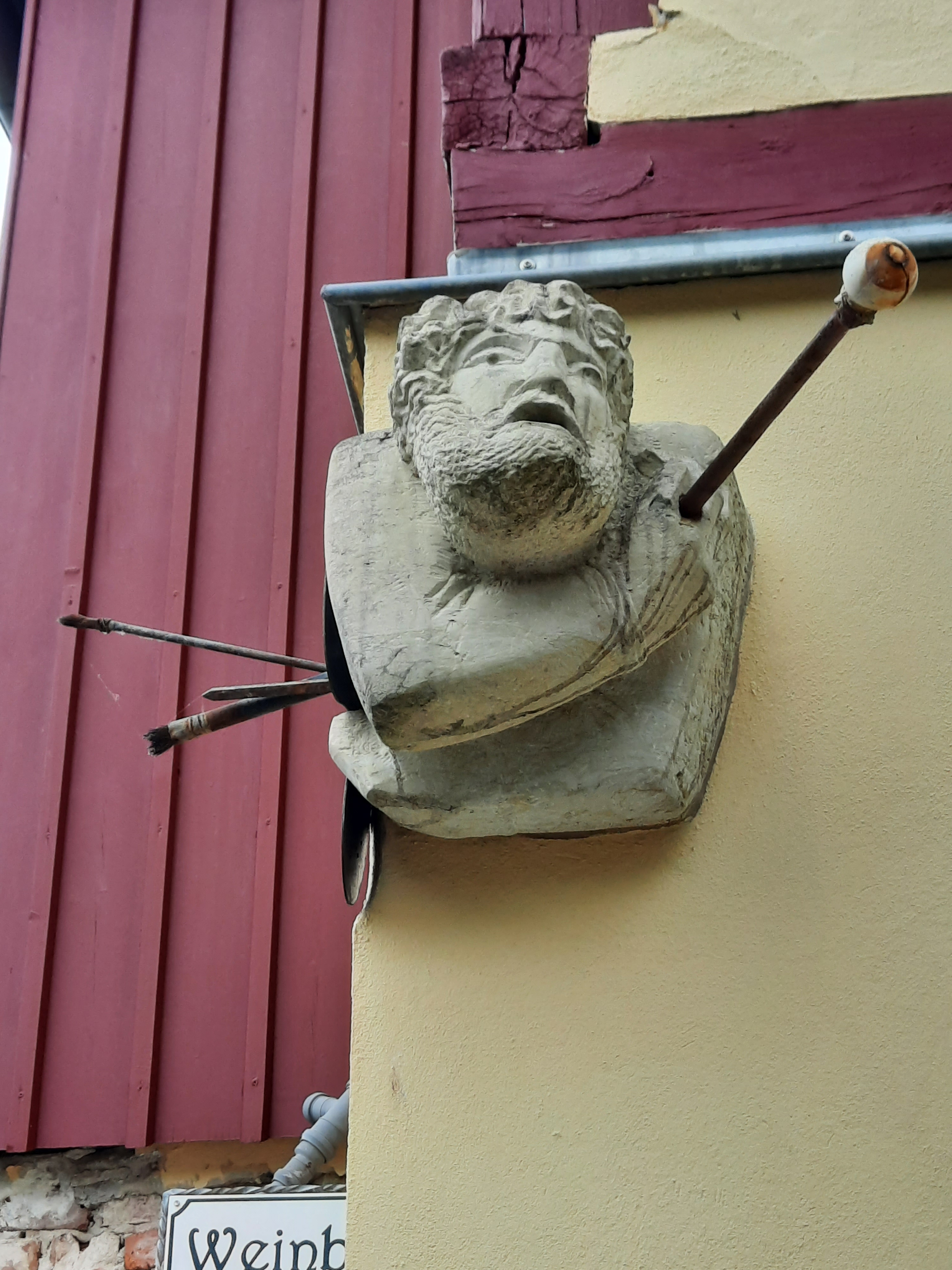
Figure on a winery building

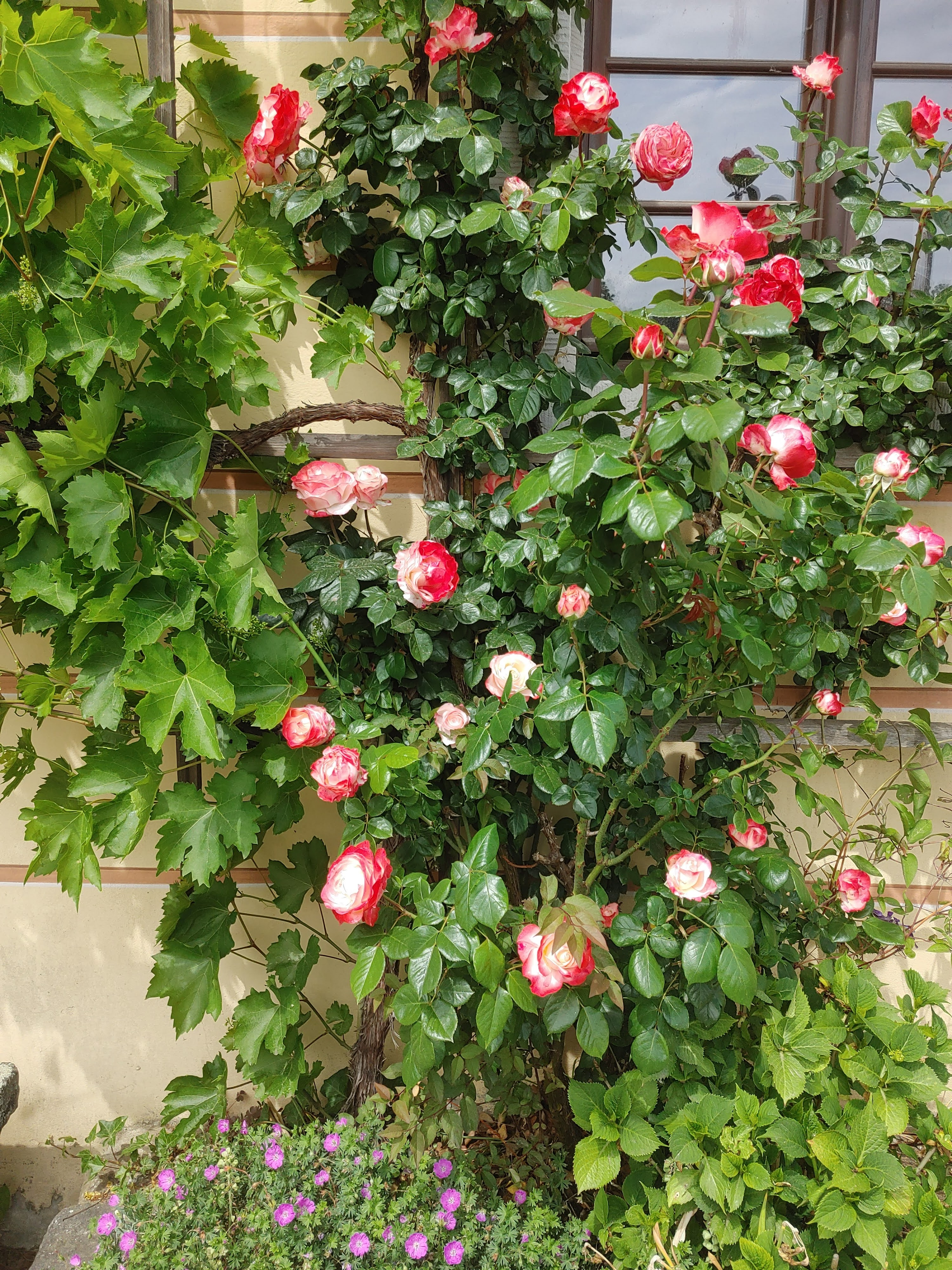
Detail of an old building

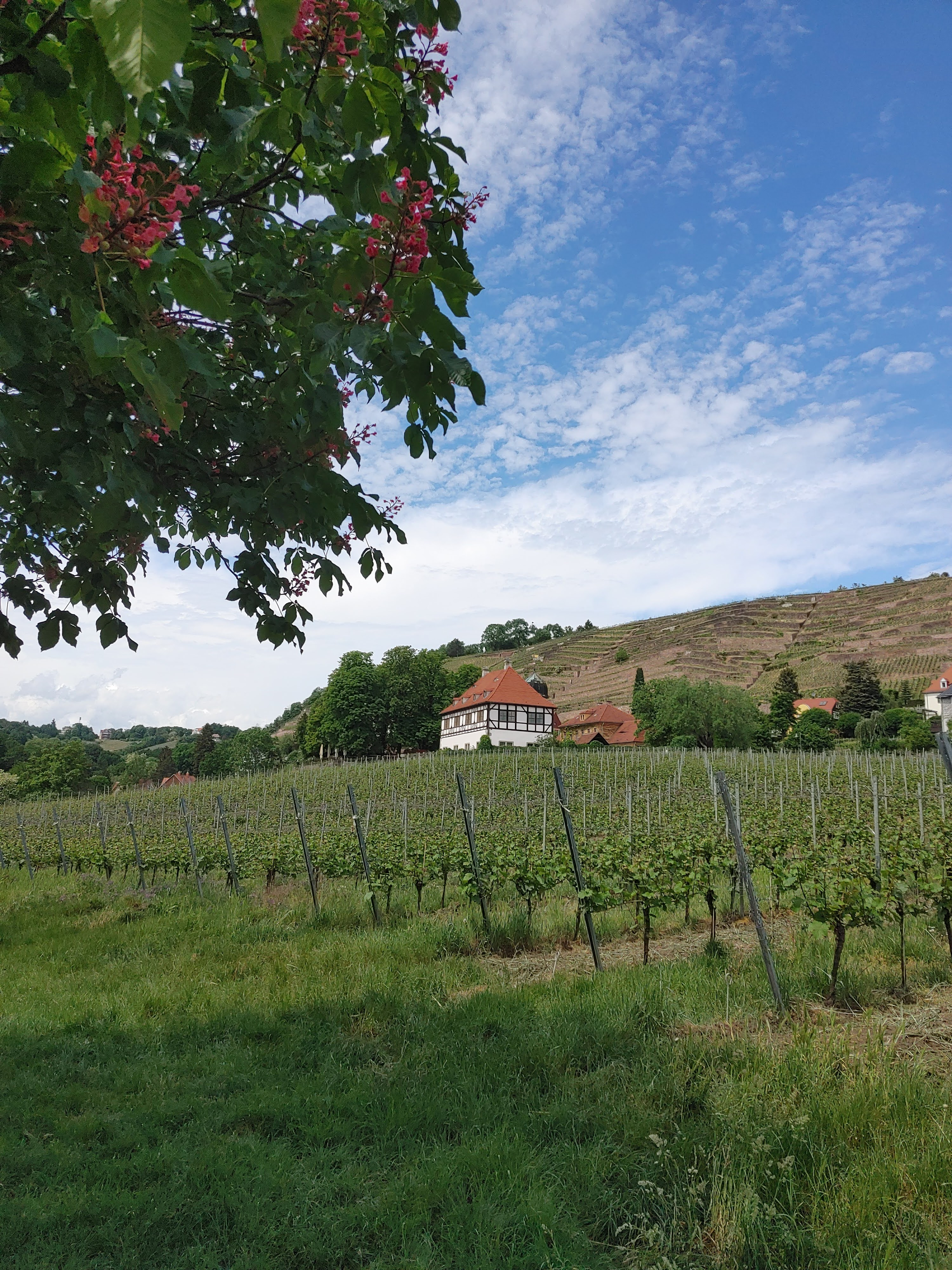
Landscape with vines

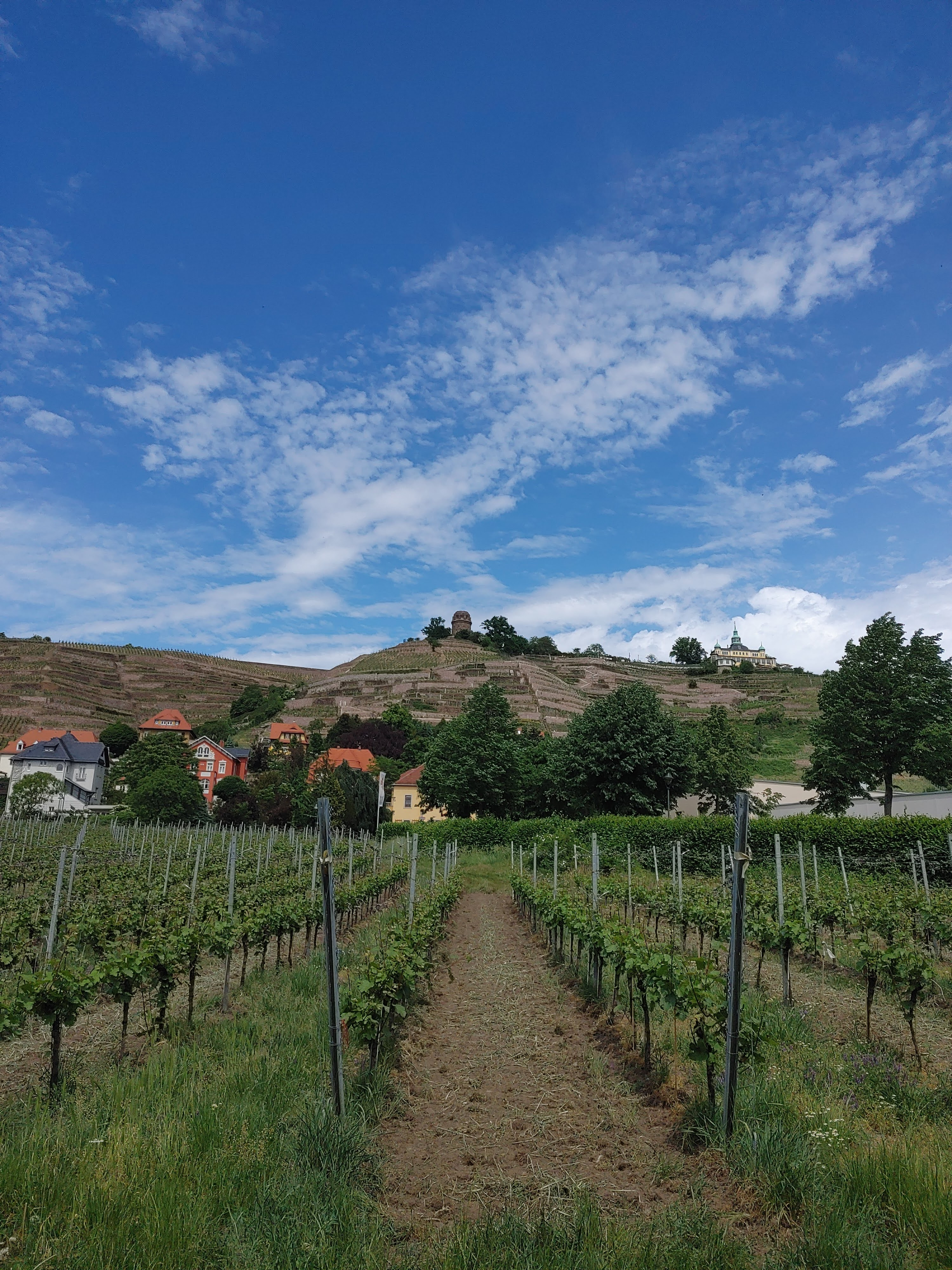
Landscape with winery

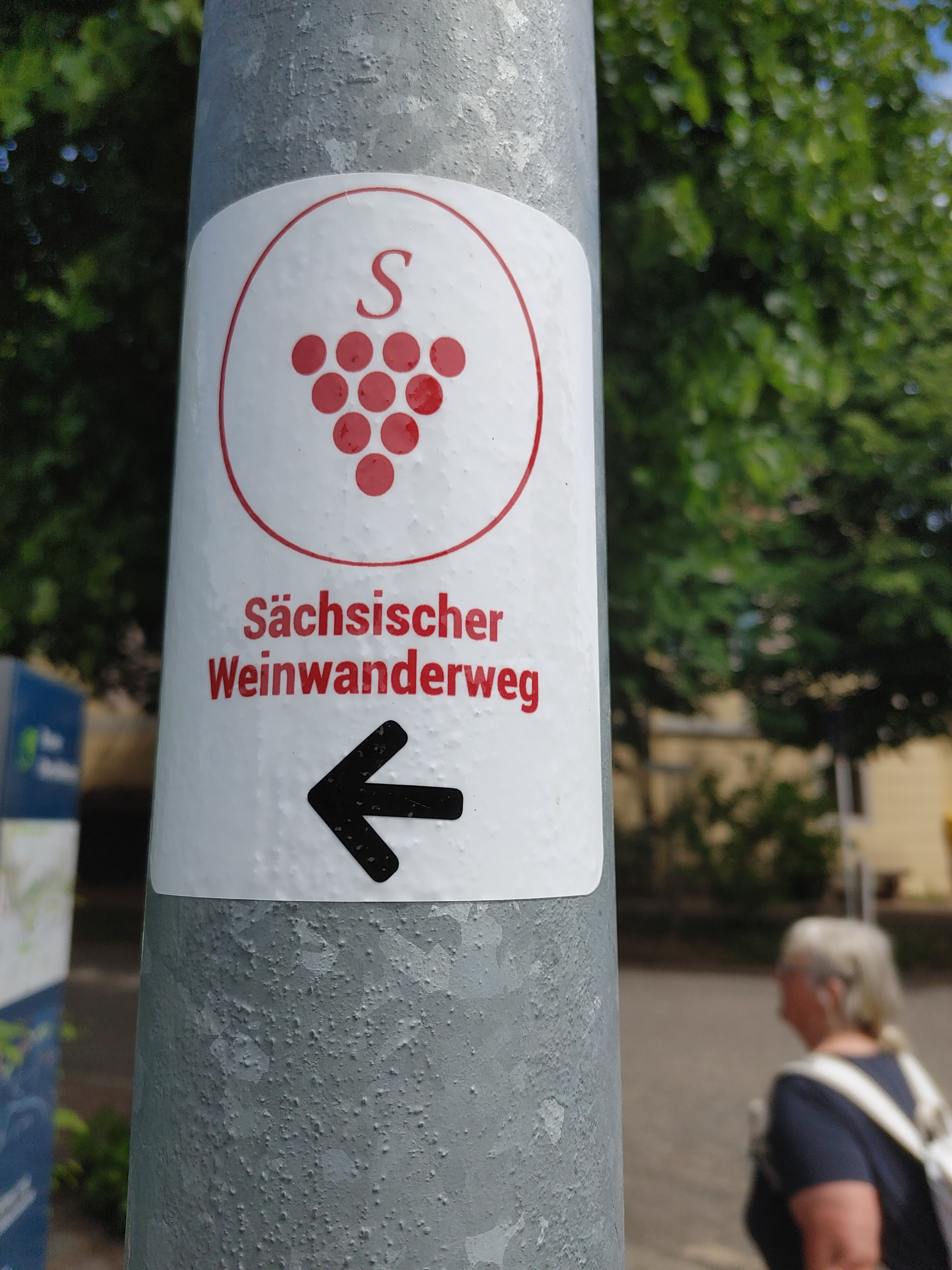
Saxon wine hiking trail

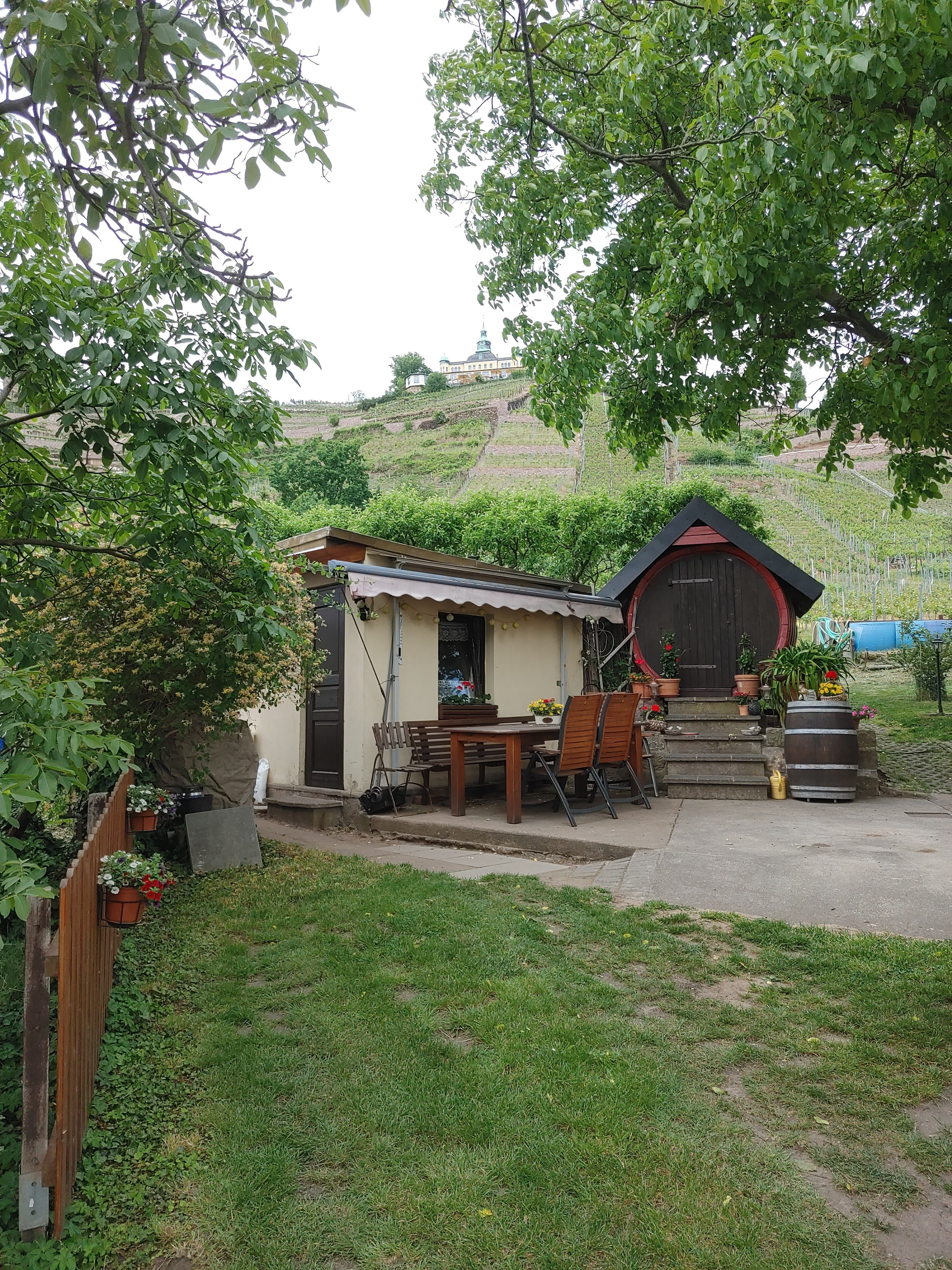
Small wine vault

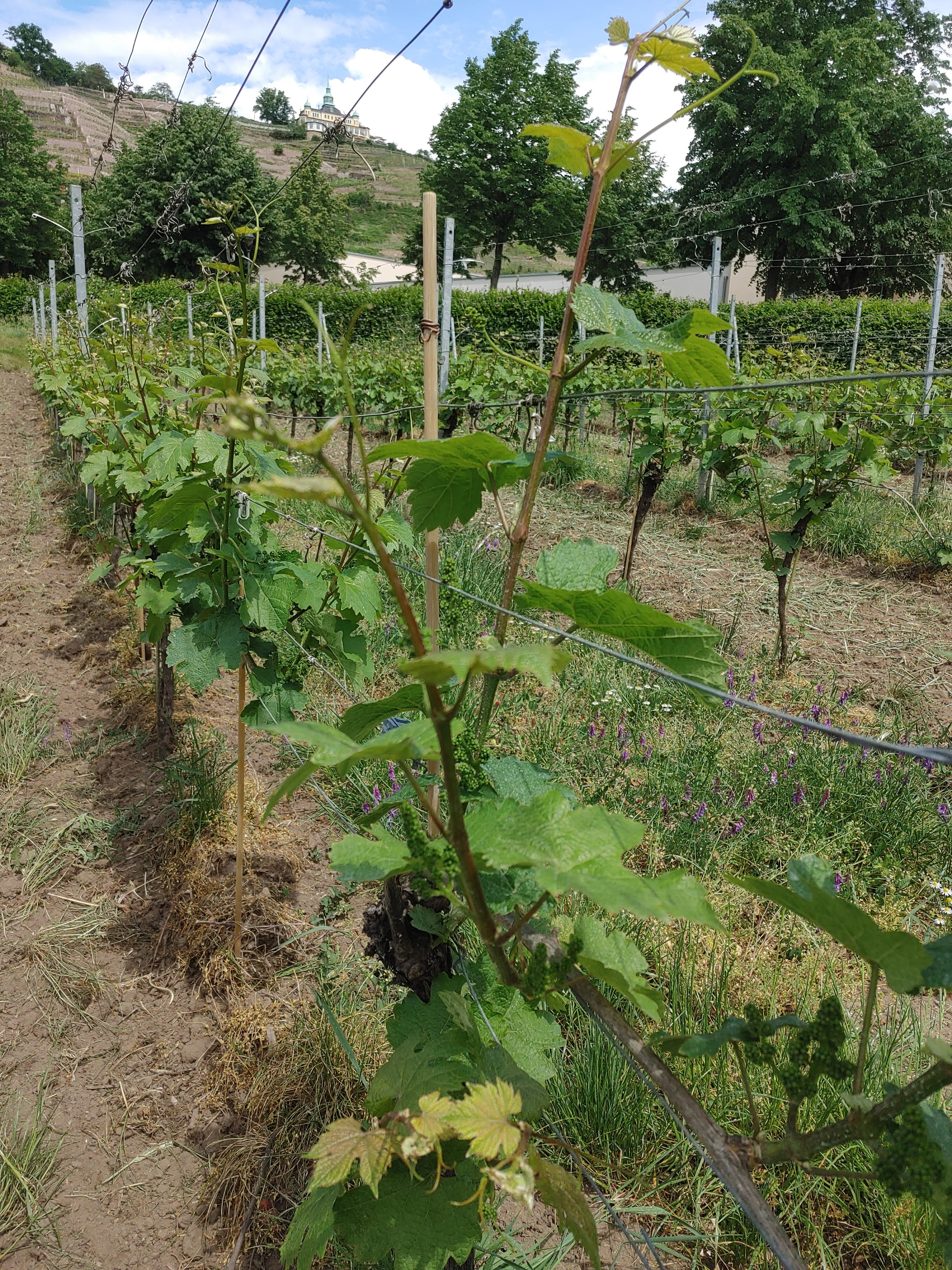
Vines in spring

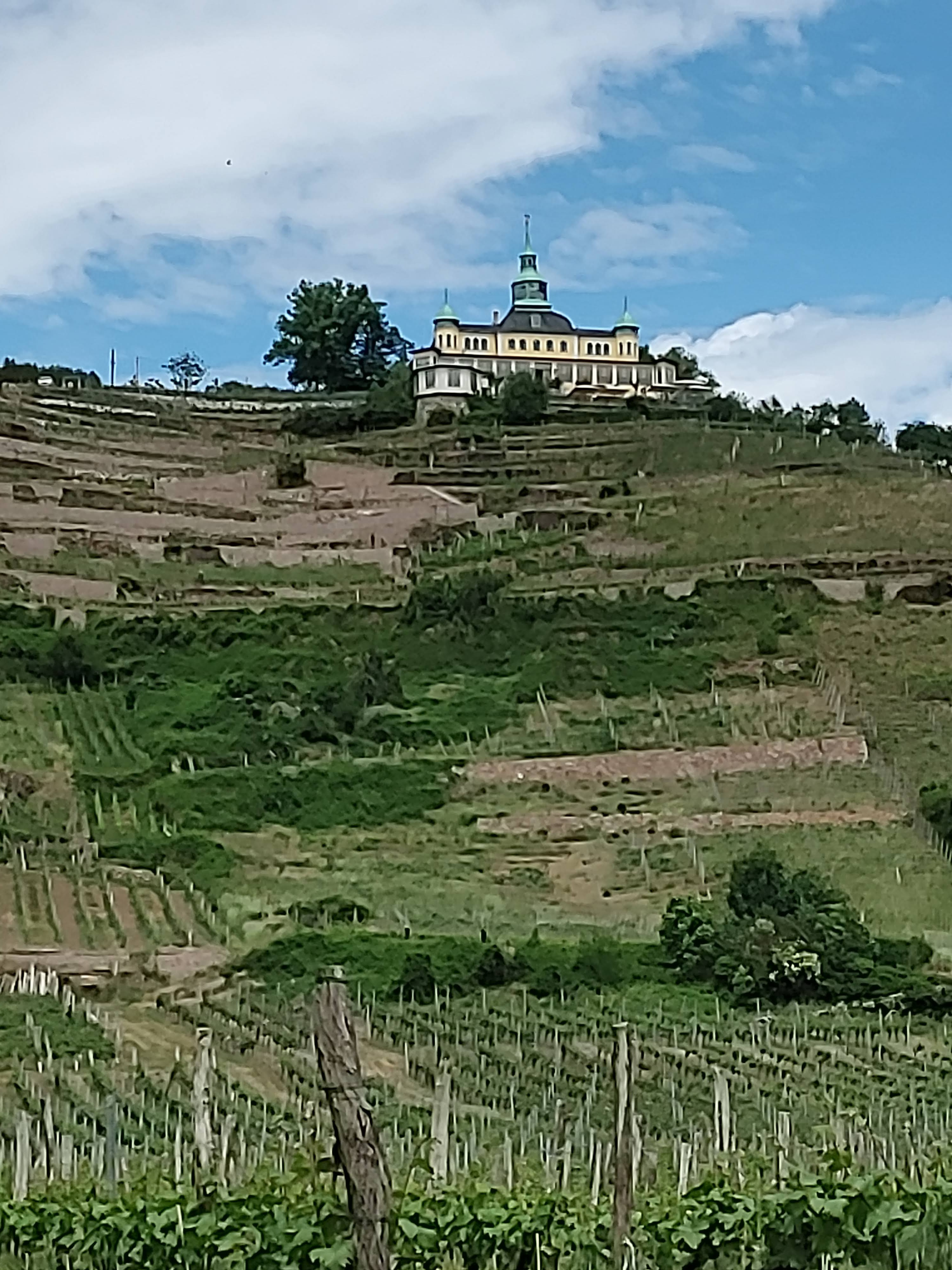
Vineyard with stately estate
