= Kihlman =

Kihlman is a surname. Notable people with the surname include:

- Christer Kihlman (1930–2021), Finland-Swedish author
- Lorenzo Kihlman, Finnish lawyer

== See also ==
- Killman
- Kuhlman
