= Kullmann =

Kullmann or Kulmann is a surname. Notable people with the surname include:

- Christopher Kullmann (born 1986), German footballer
- Dimitri Kullmann (born 1958), British neurologist
- Eduard Kullmann
- Kaci Kullmann Five, Norwegian politician
- Leonie Kullmann (born 1999), German swimmer
- Elisabeth Kulmann (1808–1825), Russian-German poet
- Olaf Kullmann (1892–1942), Norwegian naval officer and peace activist
- Samuel Kullmann

== See also ==
- Cullmann, a surname
- Kehlmann, a surname
- Kuhlman, a surname
- Kullman, a surname
