= Marechal Joffre (grape) =

Variety of grape

- Grape (Vitis)
- Color of berry skin: Noir
- Species: Vitis hybrid
- Also called: Joffre, Kuhlmann 187-1
- Origin: France

Marechal Joffre is a red inter-specific hybrid grape variety created by French viticulturist Eugène Kuhlmann (1858–1932). Like Marechal Foch, which was also created by Kuhlman, Marechal Joffre is named after a notable French World War I general, in this case Marshal (Fr. Maréchal) Joseph Joffre.

The grape is a crossing of the Vitis vinifera variety Goldriesling and another inter-specific crossing Millardet et Grasset 101-14. Through Millardet et Grasset 101-14, the pedigree of Marechal Joffre includes varieties from other species in the Vitis genus including Vitis riparia and Vitis rupestris.

== Viticulture ==
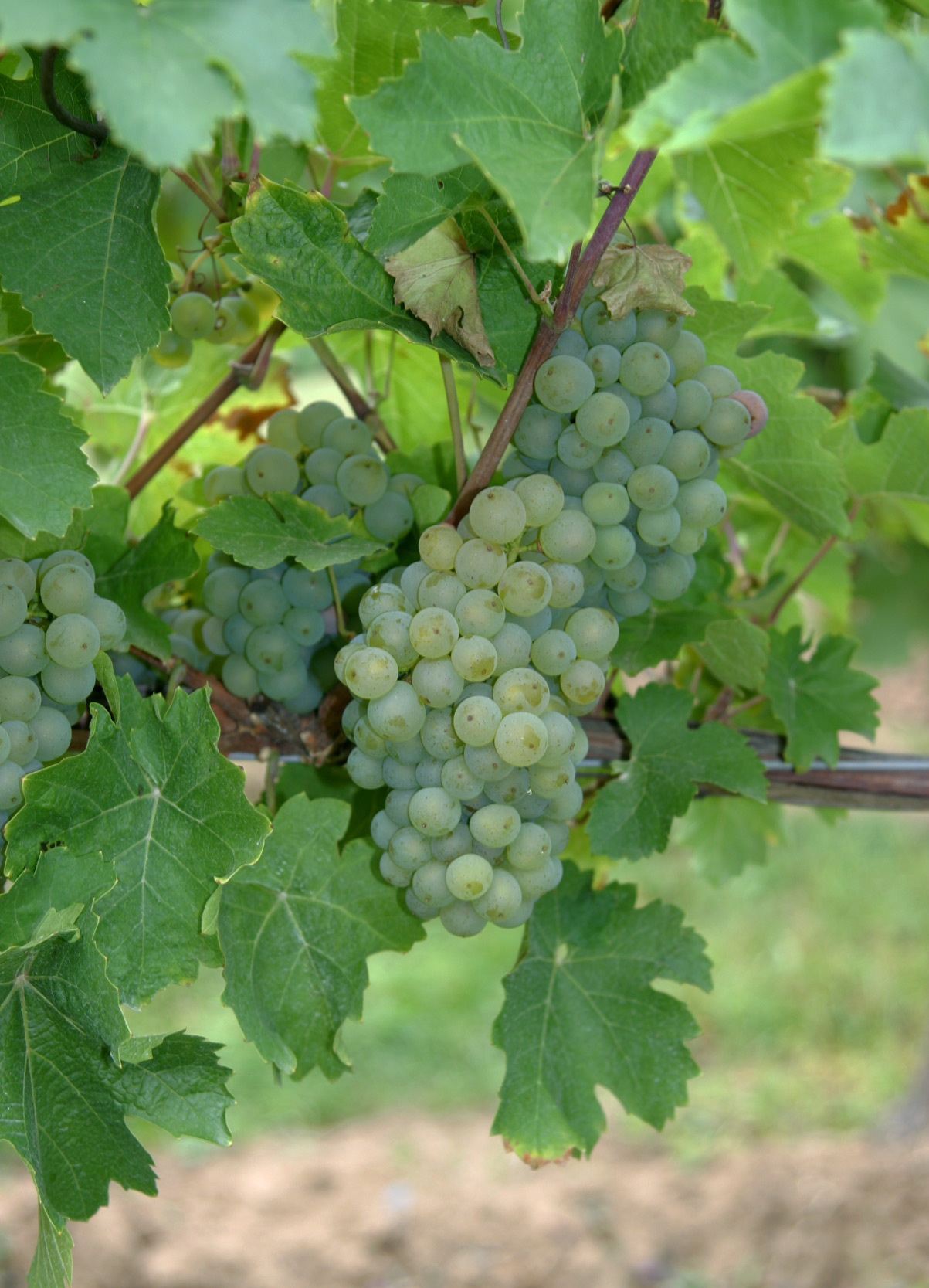
Goldriesling (pictured) is one of the parent varieties of Marechal Joffre.

Like Agria, Leon Millot, Madeleine Angevine and Siegerrebe, Marechal Joffre is a considered a "very early" ripening variety, often ripening several days to a couple weeks earlier than Marechal Foch, Pinot gris, Riesling and other varieties often grown in cool-climate regions. The grape is considered to be moderately winter hardy (though not as hardy as other Kuhlmann hybrids) with good resistance to most grapevine diseases.

Like Marechal Foch, Marechal Joffre can be a high yielding vine that produces small berries in clusters that tend to be long in length and not very compacted.

== Relationship to other varieties ==
Marechal Joffre is very similar to other hybrid varieties created by Eugène Kuhlmann, particularly Marechal Foch, Lucie Kuhlmann and Leon Millot with all the grapes being made from the same Goldriesling and Millardet et Grasset 101-14 crossing.

== Wine regions ==
The winter hardy nature and early ripening tendency of Marechal Joffre makes it suitable for cooler climates with shorter growing seasons and less degree days. It is a recommended variety for plantings in the Puget Sound AVA of western Washington state and in Colorado, particularly for vineyards located in the Colorado Front Range. Plantings of the grape can also be found in Minnesota.

In Canada there are some plantings of the variety in Nova Scotia and New Brunswick.

== Synonyms ==
As a relatively recently created hybrid variety, Marechal Joffre is not known under many synonyms with only Joffre and Kuhlmann 187-1 being recognized by the Vitis International Variety Catalogue (VIVC).

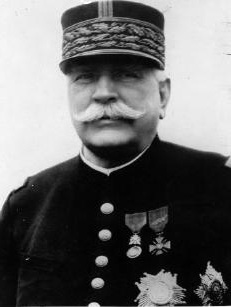
As he did with Marechal Foch, Eugène Kuhlmann named Marechal Joffre after a notable French World War I general, in this case Marshal Joseph Joffre (pictured).
