= Eduard Kullmann =

German cooper

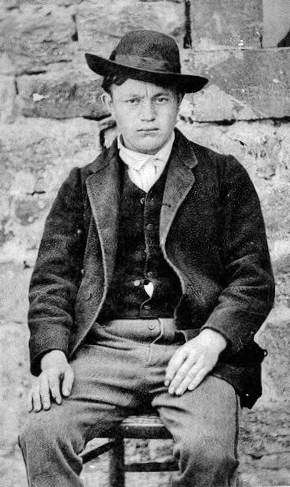
- Kullmann photographed in Bad Kissingen's prison on July 14, 1874
- Born: July 14, 1853; Magdeburg, Kingdom of Prussia
- Died: March 16, 1892 (aged 38); Amberg, German Empire
- Height: 158 cm (5 ft 2 in)
- Criminal charges: Attempted murder, Insubordination, Assault
- Criminal penalty: 3 months for assault 14 years imprisonment with hard labor for attempted murder 7 years imprisonment for insubordination

Eduard Franz Ludwig Kullmann (14 July 1853 – 16 March 1892) was a German cooper who tried to assassinate Otto von Bismarck on July 13, 1874.

== Early life ==
Kullmann was the son of a poor fishmonger from the Catholic region of Eichsfeld, and his mother was a deeply religious woman who later began to suffer from mental illness and was in psychiatric care several times as a result of trauma caused by her husband's drunkenness and neglect. His mother's father also committed suicide because of a foot ailment, which contributed to her mental decline.

Kullmann became a cooper's apprentice, and after becoming a journeyman he joined a Catholic journeyman organization in Salzwedel. Kullman became increasingly worried about the anti-Catholic sentiment in the German Empire, which ultimately reached its height with the Kulturkampf. The Falk Laws were the last straw for Kullmann, and he decided to kill Bismarck to end the Kulturkampf sometime around Easter of 1874. He also reportedly called Bismarck a "liberal scoundrel" and a "liberal philistine". Kullmann was reportedly infected with syphilis and had scars from the infection.

Kullmann had a history of violence and of not controlling his anger. In one incident he got angry and threw a cooper knife at a fellow apprentice named Gustav Welsch. In July 1873, Kullmann stabbed his fellow journeyman Carl Otto in the back with his pocketknife twice. He claimed he did it because he was drunk, and his punishment was waived after Carl dropped the charges at the court proceedings. In Salzwedel, Kullmann allegedly attacked another apprentice with a knife named Friedrich Günther. Kullmann denied this and said it was a lie that there was a knife involved. However, the attack was stopped by an Uhlan who was slightly wounded in the mouth by Kullmann's knife. He was arrested in September for trying to stab Philipp Welsch, the brother of his former master he had apprenticed under in Magdeburg. The reason given by Kullmann was that Welsch called him a "Catholic prude", and later accused him of saying something he didn't say. One month later he was convicted of assault and given three months in prison. In February 1874, Kullmann was thrown out of a ball after insulting his former master August Welsch, and he later assaulted one of the journeymen who threw him out at a hotel.

== Attempted assassination of Otto von Bismarck ==
=== Planned assassination in Berlin ===
Kullmann bought a single-shot pistol in Salzwedel and practiced shooting birds and random objects. He reportedly told a witness named Ernst Meisner, "This thing has its purpose and will achieve its purpose", referring to his new gun. Another witness named Carl Dörr, who was a cooper's apprentice, claimed that Kullmann said, "Before I die, another will fall". On May 26, 1874, Kullmann got on a train to Berlin because he saw in the newspapers that Bismarck would be there, and a witness said that Kullmann told him "He wanted to go to Berlin to find Prince Bismarck". Once he arrived in Berlin, he bought more ammunition for his gun. The search for Bismarck's apartment proved to be difficult, and his plans to kill him in Berlin were ruined when Bismarck left on May 31 to go to Varzin. To earn some money, he worked for a cooper master in Berlin, and then another one in Potsdam.

=== Waiting for another opportunity ===
While in Potsdam, a witness claimed that Kullmann told him "My hand is destined for something else, and I will act on it" while at the Christian Inn. Kullmann and another cooper named August Schulze left Potsdam on June 19 to work in the town of Sangerhausen. Schulze claims Kullmann told him, "Those are already big enough to blow out the lifeblood of someone", when he saw the large chunks of gunpowder in his dresser, and that Kullmann laughed when he saw a news article about Bismarck's poor health. Kullmann also read in the paper that Bismarck was going to Bad Kissingen for treatment, and Bismarck arrived on July 3. On July 6, Kullimann left Sangerhausen and set off to Bad Kissingen, he arrived on July 12. Since it was Sunday, the Christian day of rest, he refused to try to kill Bismarck the day he arrived. He wandered around the town asking about where Bismarck lived and when he normally leaves. His map had Bismarck's home address on it and the times people said that he normally leaves his home. The next day he went to Bismarck's home and waited for him to leave.

=== Attempted assassination in Bad Kissingen ===
==== Assassination attempt ====
Bismarck got in his carriage and headed to the spa at around 1:30 in the afternoon. Like most days, a crowd of people was outside to see him. Kullmann popped out of the crowd and fired a shot towards Bismarck's head at a distance of about one to one and a half paces. The bullet grazed Bismarck's right hand and went past his head. Bismarck also reportedly suffered burns to his face from the gun going off so close to him. Kullmann threw his pistol away and tried to run away, however the coachman Sebastian Schmidt smacked him in the face with his whip. This allowed several bystanders, including Hungarian opera singer José Lederer, to attack Kullmann and prevent him from escaping so the police could arrest him. The essentially state run newspaper Provinzial-Correspondenz described the outrage and beating by saying, "They grabbed him by all parts of his body and almost tore him to pieces, so great was the outrage at the heinous crime". One witness in the trial also claimed many people were shouting, "Hang him, the scoundrel".

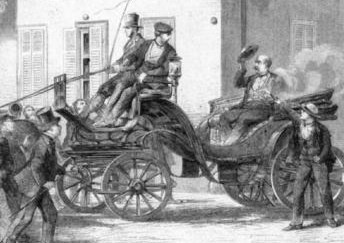
Kullman shoots at Bismarck

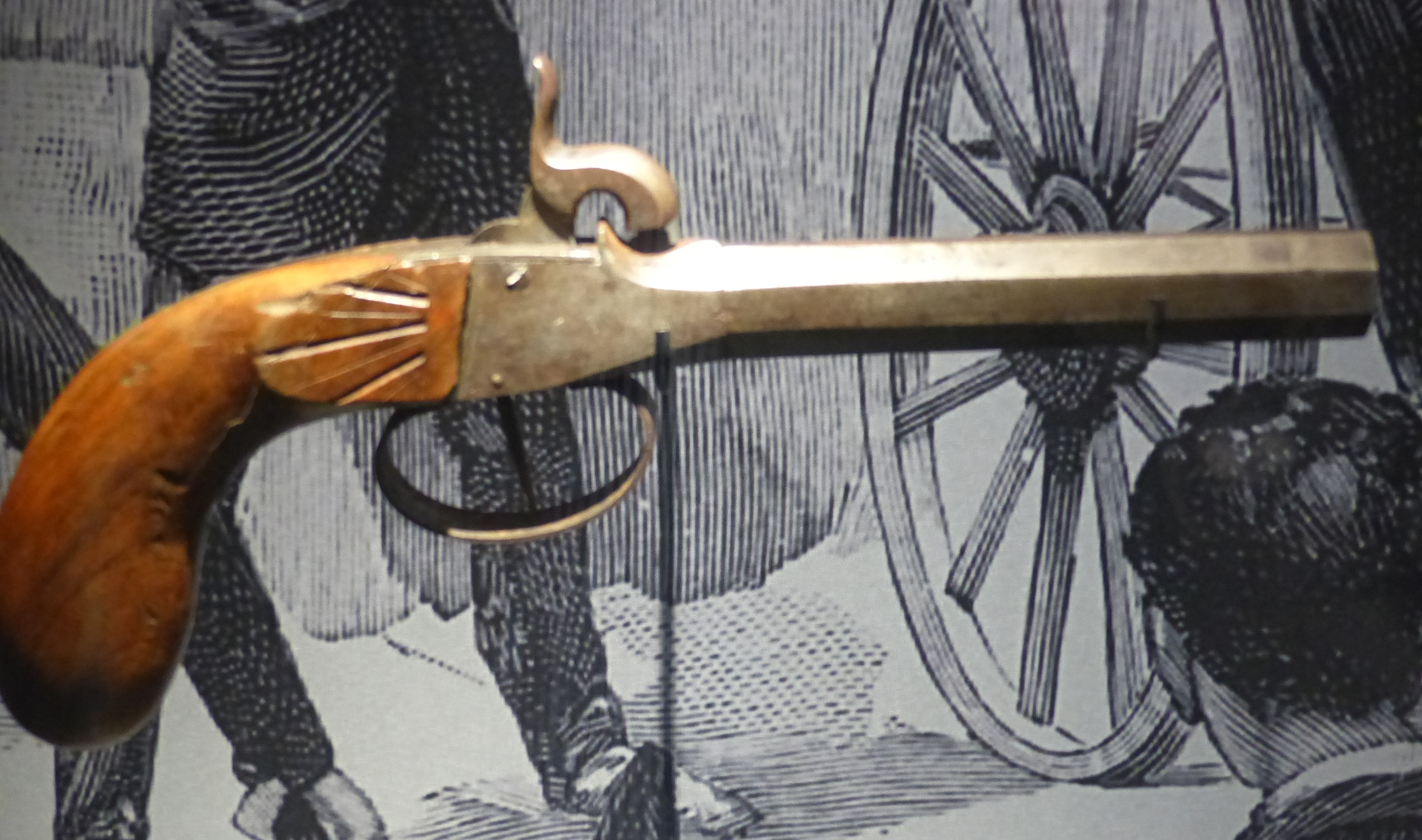
Kullman's Joseph Chaineux "bundle" revolver which shot "bundle" of small cartridges or pellets from a single barrel

==== Aftermath ====
Kullmann was taken to the local prison, before being taken to the prison in Würzburg. While in custody, he was interrogated several times and he repeatedly confessed to trying to kill Bismarck. He also stated multiple times that his only regret was that he didn't shoot better, and complained that he only missed because Bismarck moved slightly at the last second. Kullmann denied having any help from anyone or any group, saying that it was solely his own decision. He explained that he hated Bismarck for portraying Kullmann and Catholics as enemies of the Reich. A priest named Hauthaler was also apprehended because it was believed that he may have been associated with Kullmann and stepped in front of the carriage to cause a distraction, however he was later released after an investigation showed that he played no part in the crime.

The Catholic newspaper Germania, which was the media outlet for the Centre Party, explicitly condemned Kullmann's actions saying:

“All Germany, without distinction of party, will unanimously condemn, with the deepest indignation, the criminal who raises his hand to commit a deed of murder. The history of the world shows but too many murders and attempts at murder which had their origin in political animosity. The horrible nature of this crime is, however, in no wise mitigated thereby. And particularly may one feel indignant at such an undertaking when any one apparently a Christian, who even imagines that he is laboring for the faith and for the church, allows himself to be so blinded by passion or ambition as to disregard the teachings of his faith, and commit the greatest violation of the divine order of the World."

==== Trial ====
The trial was held in Würzburg and only lasted two days from October 29 to October 30. Kullmann was charged with attempted murder. 31 witnesses were called to testify, however one couldn't be questioned in court because he was in prison. The written indictment was leaked to the press by someone from the defense's law firm and a small investigation had to be done to find out who leaked it.

During the trial, Kullmann talked about how he ended up in such a radical position, and why he felt taking out Bismarck was the only way to solve the integration problem. He claims he was influenced by liberal newspapers which talked about the persecution of Catholics by the German government without an anti-Catholic bias. When asked why he called Bismarck "the worst, the most terrible enemy of the Catholic Church", he replied, "Because the liberal papers themselves portrayed him as such". Kullmann told the court that he, "considered myself an Ultramontane", and said that he considered Bismarck to be the orchestrator of the Falk Laws. He admitted to saying that if his pastor was taken away by the government, "he who wanted to take him away would fall". Despite the obvious anti-Catholic bias in the government and prosecution, they did show some sympathy, with the prosecution saying that they felt Kullmann's "fierce character" was corrupted by anti-German Catholic rhetoric.

Kullman's father did not come to the court to ask for clemency, and according to Kullmann's former elementary teacher who also knew his parents, his father was not a devout Catholic and was never once seen going to mass in the time that he'd known him. The teacher also said the mother was put in the mental hospital in Halle about a year before the crime, and she died there sometime in September 1874. Although she was severely mentally ill, she was described as kind and harmless.

Kullmann was convicted of the attempted murder of Otto von Bismarck on October 30, 1874. He was given fourteen years' imprisonment with hard labor at Bayreuth Prison. The death penalty was never on the table as they didn't want to create a Catholic martyr during the difficult times.

== Imprisonment and death ==
Special precautions were taken for Kullmann at the prison. Doors were reinforced, windows fitted with iron grilles, and all the locks near his cell were changed. While in prison, Kullmann committed 36 offenses and suffered severe consequences for his insubordination. He received a seven-year sentence for his offenses in prison and was transferred to Amberg Prison in 1888. Kullmann died alone there on March 16, 1892.
