= Kuhlman =

Kuhlman is a surname. Notable people with the surname include:

- Adam Kuhlman, animation director
- Carolina Kuhlman (1778–1866), Swedish actress
- Evan Kuhlman, American children's author
- Jeffrey Kuhlman (born 1963), American physician
- Karson Kuhlman (born 1995), American ice hockey player
- Kathryn Kuhlman (1907–1976), American evangelist
- Ray Kuhlman (1900–1956), American politician

== See also ==
- G. C. Kuhlman Car Company
- Cullmann, a surname
- Kehlmann, a surname
- Kihlman, a surname
- Kuhlmann (disambiguation)
- Kullmann, a surname
