= Wolfgang Kuhlmann =

German philosopher (1939 – 2025)

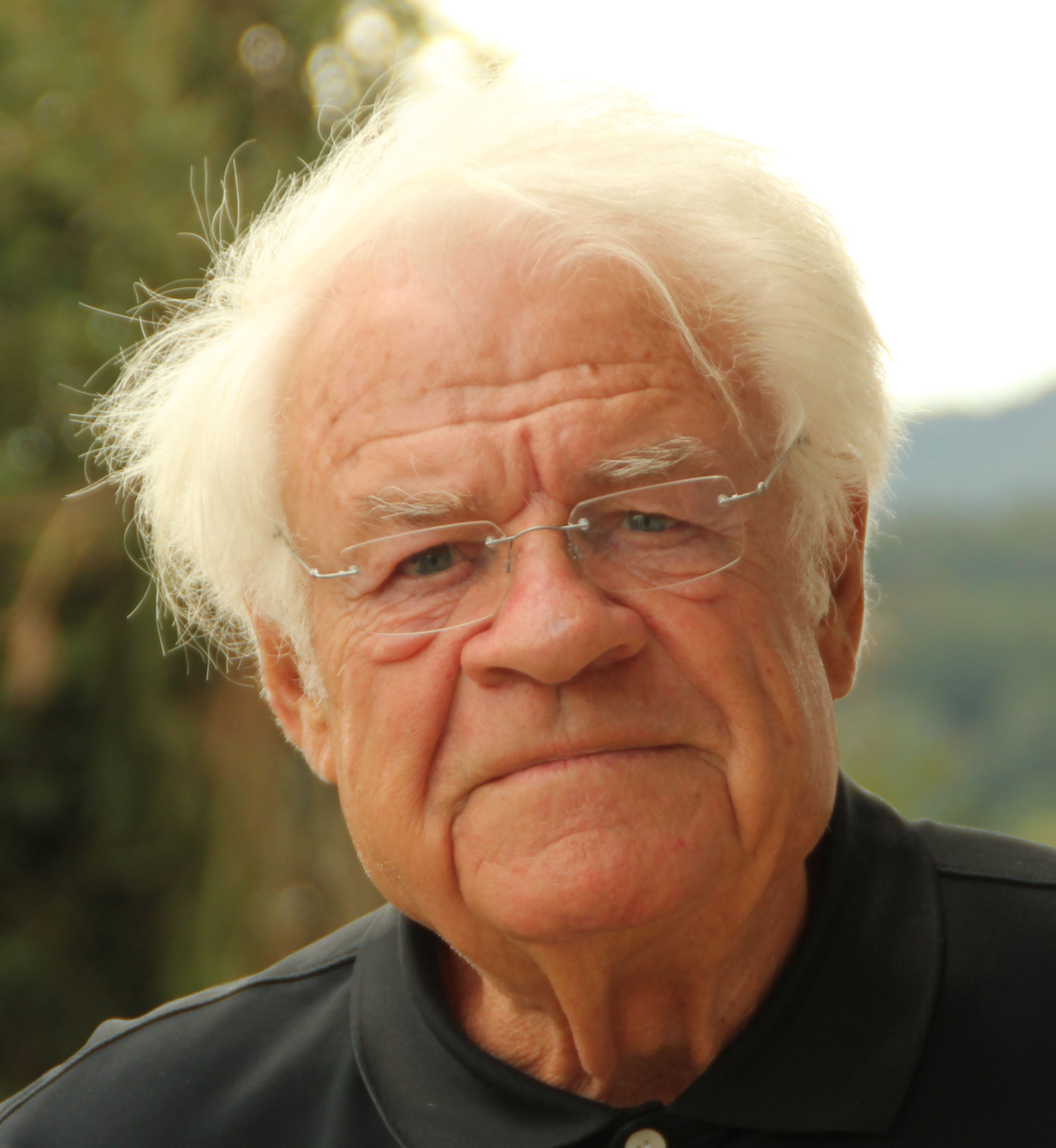
- Kuhlmann in 2019
- Born: October 1939; Kiel, Germany
- Died: August 2025 (aged 85); Wuppertal, Germany

Education
- Education: Kiel University
- Doctoral advisor: Karl-Otto Apel

Wolfgang Kuhlmann (19 October 1939 – 7 August 2025) was a German philosopher and representative of discourse ethics. He was a professor at the Goethe University, the University of Erfurt, and the RWTH Aachen University.

== Life and career ==
Born in Kiel in 1939, Kuhlmann studied German, Greek and philosophy. He received his doctorate from Kiel University in 1974, where he had studied with Karl-Otto Apel and was a colleague of Peter Rohs. Kuhlmann followed Apel to Goethe University in Frankfurt, where he worked as lecturer in philosophy. With Apel, Jürgen Habermas and others, he focused on Transzendentalpragmatik (transcendental pragmatism), an influential school in the late 20th century, departing from Kantian thoughts in the direction of American pragmatists such as Charles Sanders Peirce as well as those of Ludwig Wittgenstein. Kuhlmann had written his habilitation, titled Reflexive Letztbegründung (Reflexive ultimate justification), in 1985, where he argued that a rationally communicating actor is relieant on implicit knowledge of the rules of reasonable communication which can be uncovered by "strict reflection".

From 1985 to 1992 Kuhlmann was managing director and editor of the publication series in the Forum für Philosophie in Bad Homburg, an institution that aims at nudging politics and economics towards philosophical perspectives. In this context he collaborated with Eberhard Schnelle from 1987 to 1991. In 1989 Kuhlmann became full professor at the University of Frankfurt, from 1992 held a chair at the University of Erfurt, and from 1993 to 2005 he was professor at RWTH Aachen.

Kuhlmann affirmed the possibility of ultimate justification taking an universalist position, and claiming ultimate justification especially for discourse ethics in Apel's sense.

Wolfgang Kuhlmann died in Wuppertal in August 2025, at the age of 85.

== Work ==
- Reflexion und kommunikative Erfahrung. Suhrkamp Verlag, Frankfurt 1975. ISBN 978-3-518-57440-9
- Reflexive Letztbegründung. Untersuchungen zur Transzendentalpragmatik. Alber Verlag, Freiburg/Munich 1985. ISBN 978-3-495-47568-3.
- Kant und die Transzendentalpragmatik. Würzburg, Germany: Verlag Königshausen & Neumann, 1992. ISBN 978-3-8847-9645-0
- Sprachphilosophie, Hermeneutik, Ethik. Studien zur Transzendentalpragmatik. Würzburg, Germany: Verlag Königshausen & Neumann, 1992.
- Moralität und Sittlichkeit. Suhrkamp Verlag, Frankfurt, 1986. ISBN 978-3-8847-9646-7
- Beiträge zur Diskursethik. Studien zur Transzendentalpragmatik. Würzburg, Germany: Verlag Königshausen & Neumann, 2007. ISBN 978-3-8260-3321-6. OCLC 77548416.
- Unhintergehbarkeit. Studien zur Transzendentalpragmatik. Würzburg, Germany: Verlag Königshausen & Neumann, 2010. ISBN 978-3-8260-4045-0. OCLC 540980901.
- Zur Struktur unserer Vernunft: Studien zur Transzendentalpragmatik. Würzburg, Germany: Königshausen & Neumann, 2023. ISBN 978-3-8260-7670-1.
