= Léon Millot =

Variety of grape

- Grape (Vitis)
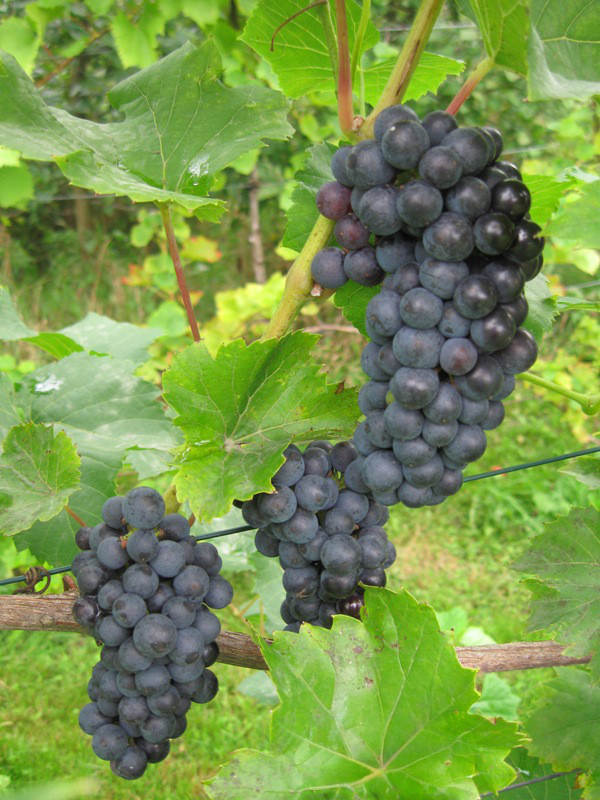
- Color of berry skin: Noir
- Species: (Vitis riparia × Vitis rupestris) × Vitis vinifera
- Also called: see below
- Origin: France
- VIVC number: 6806

Léon Millot (sometimes called "Leon Millot Rouge" (or "Foster's Leon") to distinguish it from "Leon Millot Noir" (a.k.a. "Wagner's Leon") which many breeders believe to be Oberlin N595) is a red variety of hybrid grape used for wine. It was created in 1911 in the Oberlin Institute in Colmar, Alsace, by the French viticulturist Eugène Kuhlmann (1858–1932) by crossing the hybrid grape Millardet et de Grasset 101-14 O.P. (which is Vitis riparia × Vitis rupestris) with Goldriesling, which is Vitis vinifera. The variety was named after the winemaker and tree nursery owner Léon Millot.

== Characteristics ==
Léon Millot ripens early, is blue-skinned, grows with fair vigor, and has high resistance against fungal diseases. It is therefore suited for cultivation in cooler climates. The grape has small berries and small clusters (perhaps 0.20 lbs/cluster), and thus it is time-consuming to manually harvest. It can yield a bigger wine similar to a ripe Syrah, or a lighter wine more in the style of Pinot Noir. Common aromatic and flavor profiles for Leon Millot include earthy/barnyard/woodsy notes, purple fruits, and chocolate.

== Winemaking ==
There are two general approaches to winemaking with Leon Millot: First, if the grapes are pressed at crush and removed from the skins after a few hours of contact time, the juice makes a bright cherry-red wine whose flavor is rich and vivid. The chemistry is fairly simple with this approach. Second, the traditional approach involves long skin contact time, with malolactic fermentation and subsequent tartaric addition. This produces a medium-bodied red wine that takes oak and ages well, with the flavor profile of a rustic Pinot Noir. Some winemakers believe that if left on the skins too long, Leon Millot can develop unwanted herbaceous notes. Also, the grape is high in malic acid and a malolactic fermentation is usually necessary. A malic-reducing yeast might also be used to good effect. As the grape is low in tannin, a tannin addition during fermentation is often useful, and that may also help to prevent color loss. If Leon Millot is allowed to remain too long at higher pH levels, its deep, vivid purple color can change to red or brick red.

== Cultivation ==
Léon Millot is cultivated in small amounts in Switzerland (on 9.35 hectares (23.1 acres) in 2009), Alsace, Oregon, New Mexico, Ohio, and Canada. In August 2011, a Leon Millot varietal wine produced by Keuka Lake Vineyards in the Finger Lakes region of New York State won the prize for "best red wine" in the "New York Wine and Food Classic," sponsored by the New York Wine and Grape Foundation and open to all of New York's 307 wineries.

== Regulation ==
In similarity with many other hybrid grapes, Leon Millot was originally not allowed to be used in professional winemaking in the European Union. However, after the regulations were somewhat relaxed, varieties with some Vitis vinifera in their pedigree, such as Léon Millot, are currently allowed to be used for wine production in Europe.

Léon Millot was the product of the same crossing trials as Lucie Kuhlmann, Marechal Joffre (grape) and Marechal Foch (grape), and these three varieties are related.

== Synonyms ==
Léon Millot is also known under the synonyms Kuhlmann 194-2 and Millot. It is also supposed to have been called Frühe Schwarze when cultivated in the German wine region of Ahr.
