= Katharina Kuhlmann =

German model (born 1977)

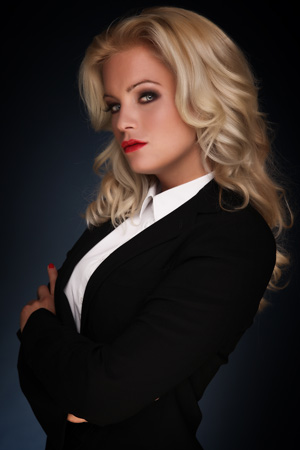
- Kuhlmann in 2009
- Born: Katharina Kuhlmann; 1 July 1977 (age 49); Hanover, Lower Saxony, Germany
- Modeling information
- Height: 5 ft 8 in (1.73 m)
- Hair color: Blond
- Eye color: Blue
- Website: www.katharinakuhlmann.de

Katharina Kuhlmann (born 1 July 1977) is a German model. From 2004 to 2007 she was a presenter on the motorsport show Tuning TV, and on other shows, on the German sports channel Deutsches Sportfernsehen. She currently appears mostly in motorsport-related catalog and calendar shoots, and actively promotes the sport of drift racing.

In 2004 Kuhlmann appeared in a photo shoot for Maxim magazine. In 2007 she appeared in Playboy magazine.

In 2011 she created a "Wellness Car", a modified SL 500, with kind of an Electrotherapy that will help to beware you of an microsleep and your body cells will keep in movement and you will feel healthier after driving in your car, as usual. The "box" can be added to every car/truck and it costs about €2000.
