= Moysés Kuhlmann =

Brazilian botanist (1906–1972)

Moysés Kuhlmann (December 4, 1906 – January 12, 1972) was a Brazilian born botanist.
