= Goldriesling =

Variety of grape

- Grape (Vitis)
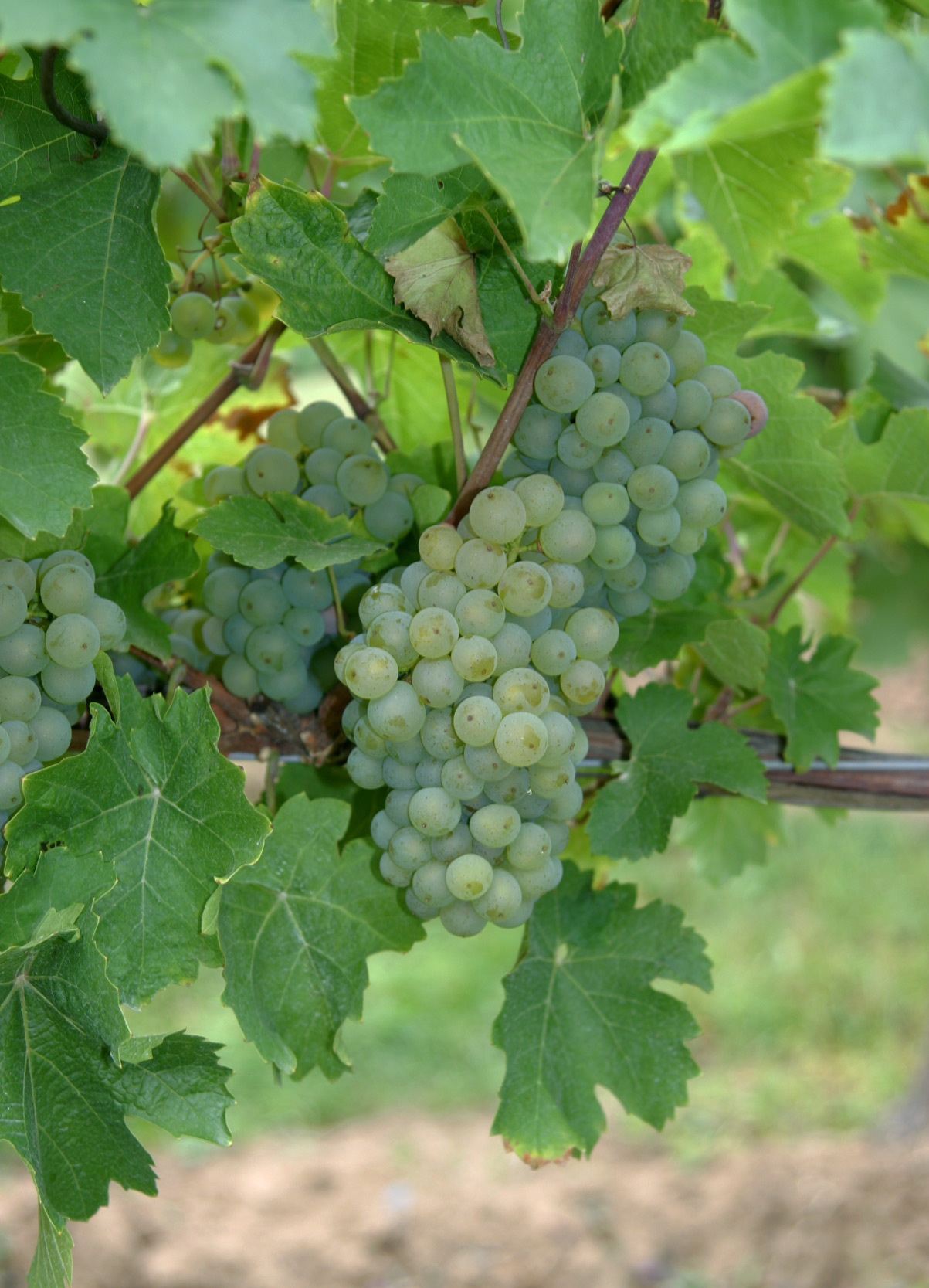
- Leaves and grapes of Goldriesling
- Color of berry skin: Blanc
- Species: Vitis vinifera
- Also called: see below
- Origin: France
- VIVC number: 4884

Goldriesling is a grape variety of the species Vitis vinifera used for white wine. It was created in 1893 by Christian Oberlin in Colmar, Alsace by crossing Riesling with another grape variety, which is sometimes given as Courtillier Musqué Précoce, but not identified conclusively.

Goldriesling is typically characterised by Muscat-like aromas and high acidity, and ripens fairly early.

It has been used as a crossing partner for several other grape varieties including Lucie Kuhlmann, Léon Millot, Marechal Joffre and Maréchal Foch.

Goldriesling is an approved grape variety for German wine, but is almost only cultivated in Saxony, where it covered 17 hectares (42 acres) in 2008.

== Synonyms ==
Goldriesling is known under the synonyms Goldmuskat, Riesling Doré, Riesling Khativ and Risling Zolotistyi.
