= Kuhlemann =

Kuhlemann is a German topographic surname. It may be derived from the place of residence, from Middle High German (Central German) kūle 'pit', Middle Low German kūle 'pit, depression, hole'. Notable people with the surname include:

- Christian Kuhlemann (1891–1964), German politician
- Johannes Theodor Kuhlemann (1891–1939), German journalist and writer in the Cologne dialect
- Frank-Michael Kuhlemann (born 1955), German historian
- Peter Kuhlemann (1913–2005), German zoologist and author
