= Samuel Kullmann =

Swiss politician

Samuel Timutschin Kullmann (born September 21, 1986 in Leeds) is a Swiss politician (EDU).

== Life and work ==
Born in Leeds, England, Samuel Kullmann spent twelve years of his childhood in Ulaanbaatar, Mongolia, until he began attending Gymnasium in Thun in 2003. In the same year, he became a member of EDU Switzerland and began his political engagement on the board of the EDU City of Thun. In 2005, he collected approximately 5,000 signatures with the regional youth party and friends for the Federal Popular Initiative "For the Non-Expiration of Pornographic Crimes Against Children", which was later accepted by the electorate despite opposition from the Federal Council and the Parliament. After completing his Matura, Kullmann served in the Swiss Army as a strategic signals intelligence officer and began studying Political Science, English, Social Sciences, and Media Studies at the University of Bern, where he graduated with a bachelor's degree in 2011. After working as a research assistant at the University of Bern, he worked for the Swiss Embassy in Ethiopia. In 2014, he completed his master's degree in political science with a focus on "Comparative and Swiss Politics." At the end of 2014, he began working as a political employee for EDU Switzerland. In 2015, Kullmann became self-employed as a political consultant, financial advisor, and translator (in addition to his native German he speaks English, French, Swahili, and Dutch). In 2016, he led the campaign against the amendment to the reproductive medicine law. After several unsuccessful candidacies for the Grand Council, Kullmann succeeded EDU politician Daniel Beutler as a member of the Bernese legislature in 2017. On May 1st 2026 he married Joyce Lynne Hasler.

== Politics ==
Kullmann's main concerns include combating human trafficking and forced prostitution, financial policy, the right to life, and families. Since 2017, he has also been advocating for victims and survivors of ritual abuse. The smartmap for the 2019 National Council elections places Kullmann in the value-oriented center.

During his time in the Grand Council of the Canton of Bern,. Accessed August 24, 2021. Kullmann has submitted motions on the following topics:

- Prevention in the area of lover boy issues and human trafficking in schools
- More resources for law enforcement agencies and stronger cooperation with civil society in combating human trafficking
- Transition of the cantonal vehicle fleet to electric
- Exploring and utilizing the medical potential of cannabis: Establishment of a chair for medical cannabis research at the University of Bern
- No circumvention of the right of the population and municipalities to participate in decisions regarding 5G antennas
