= Cullmann =

Cullmann or Cullman is a German surname. Notable people with the surname include:

- Bernd Cullmann (1939–2025), West German athlete
- Bernhard Cullmann (born 1949), German footballer
- Carl Culmann (1821–1881), German structural engineer
- Edgar M. Cullman (1918–2011), American businessman
- Howard S. Cullman (1891–1972), American civil servant and philanthropist
- John G. Cullmann (1823–1895), Bavarian-born political activist and founder of Cullman, Alabama
- Joseph Cullman (1912–2004), American businessman
- Nan Ogburn Cullman (1929–2015), American singer and philanthropist
- Oscar Cullmann (1902–1999), Christian theologian in the Lutheran tradition

== See also ==
- Cullman (disambiguation)
- Kehlmann, a surname
- Kuhlman, a surname
- Kuhlmann (disambiguation)
- Kullmann, a surname
