= Killman Zoo =

Coordinates: 43.1025°N 79.9143°W

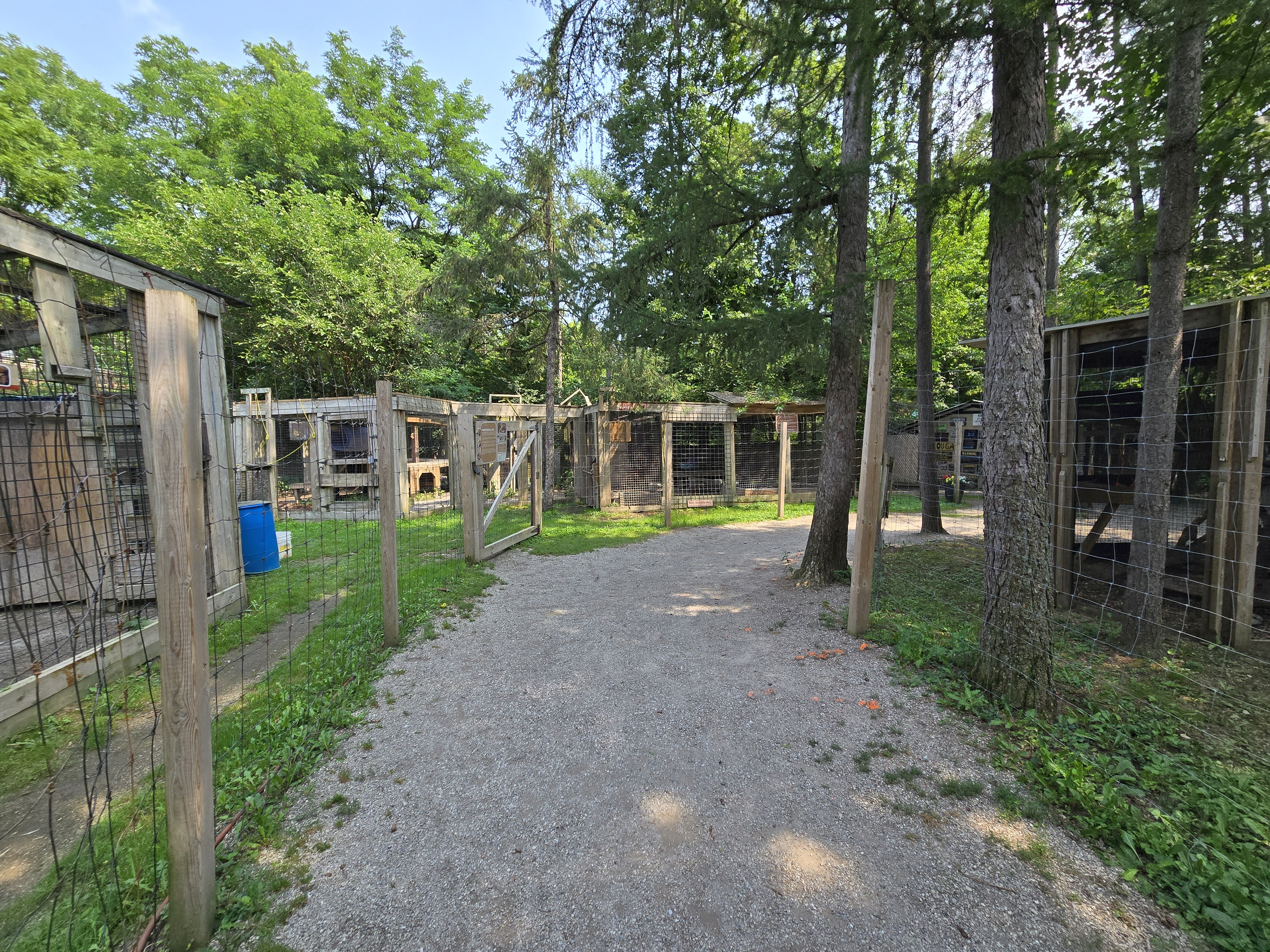
- Path between exhibits at Killman Zoo.
- Interactive map of Killman Zoo
- Date opened: April 1, 1988
- Location: 237 Unity Road East, Caledonia, Haldimand County, Ontario, Canada
- Land area: 13 hectares (33 acres/130,000 m^{2})
- No. of species: 45
- Owner: Joanne Killman, Mark Killman

Killman Zoo is a privately owned zoo approximately 4 kilometres or 2.5 miles north of Caledonia in Haldimand County, Ontario, Canada.

== History ==
Killman Zoo was founded by the wildlife artist Murray Killman. Murray obtained his first big cat, a cougar named Maggie, in 1979, who became the subject of many paintings. Throughout the 1980s, Murray acquired more big cats, and numerous enclosures were built to house them. Murray's property soon became known as Killman's Wildlife Sanctuary. In 1982, Murray's son, Mark, began giving tours of the property by appointment. By 1987, the idea came about to convert Killman's Wildlife Sanctuary into a zoo open to the public. Killman Zoo officially opened on April 1, 1988. Since 1988, the zoo has continued to expand. As of 2020, the zoo spanned 33 acres and housed animals of 45 different species.

== Overview ==
This rural zoo is located 2 kilometres or 1.2 miles east of Highway 6 at 237 Unity Road East. It is a privately owned and operated zoo using 9 acres (36,000 m^{2}) of trails on a property spanning 33 acres (130,000 m^{2}). There are gift shops and picnic facilities; which allow guests to eat pre-packaged food at the zoo. Tamer animals like dwarf goats and deer can be petted by people of all ages at the special petting zoo portion of the attraction. People with wheelchairs are able to access the sights with wheelchair-accessible trails.

The Killman family that operates the zoo are descended from the Seneca, Onondaga and Mohawk Tribes of the Canadian First Nations. An adult ticket costs $25.00 while a child's ticket costs $16.00. The zoo is an ongoing project and expansion is commonly taking place.

The zoo contains a wide range of animals including lemurs, porcupines, coyotes, wolves, birds of prey, a bear and about 30 exotic cats. Felids make up a large portion of the zoo including lions, tigers, jaguars, lynx, bobcats and cougars. You can get as close to 5 feet to these animals.

In 2022, the Killman Zoo, along with ten other Ontario zoos, was named in report by the Canadian branch of the non-profit group World Animal Protection. The report, submitted to the Provincial Animal Welfare Services (a government body tasked with overseeing animal welfare laws in Ontario), mainly raised concern about enclosure size, and lack of space for big cats to remove themselves from public view. Owners Joanne and Mark Killman, in an interview with the Hamilton Spectator, affirmed that the welfare of their animals is a top priority, and explained that while the zoo is continually working to improve enclosures, the budget must prioritize the animals' medical costs. The two also stated that the zoo is regularly licensed and inspected by the Provincial Animal Welfare Services.
