= Cullman =

Cullman may refer to:

- USS Cullman (APA-78), an attack transport ship that served in the US Navy during World War II
- Cullman, Alabama, a city
- Cullman County, Alabama, a county
  - List of Registered Historic Places in Cullman County, Alabama
- Cullman High School, largest high school in Cullman, Alabama
- Birmingham-Hoover-Cullman Combined Statistical Area, an area known as Greater Birmingham

== See also ==
- Cullmann, a surname
