= Auguste Courtiller =

Auguste Courtiller (1795-1875) was a French paleontologist and viticulturist. Muscat de Saumur was first cultivated in 1842 by Auguste Courtiller, who created it by selecting seedlings from a Pinot Noir Précoce vine with open pollination. Courtiller worked in the Jardin des Plantes of the city of Saumur.

As a paleontologist, he described the ammonites species Ammonites cephalotus (syn. of Neoptychites telinga) in 1860 and Kamerunoceras salmuriensis in 1867. He also named the genus Cupulina in 1861.

== Works ==
- Éponges fossiles des sables du terrain crétacé supérieur des environs de Saumur: étage senonien de d'Orbigny. A Courtiller - 1861
- Catalogue du musée de Saumur. A Courtiller, C Trouillard - 1868
