= Précoce =

Précoce is a French term meaning precocial but which when used in viticulture is a term for "early ripening". This term is used in the names (or synonyms) of a number of more-or-less early ripening grape varieties.

Grape varieties with "Précoce" as part of their name include:

- Malingre Précoce
- Muscat Précoce de Saumur
- Pinot Noir Précoce
