= Muscat d'Eisenstadt =

Variety of grape

- Grape (Vitis)
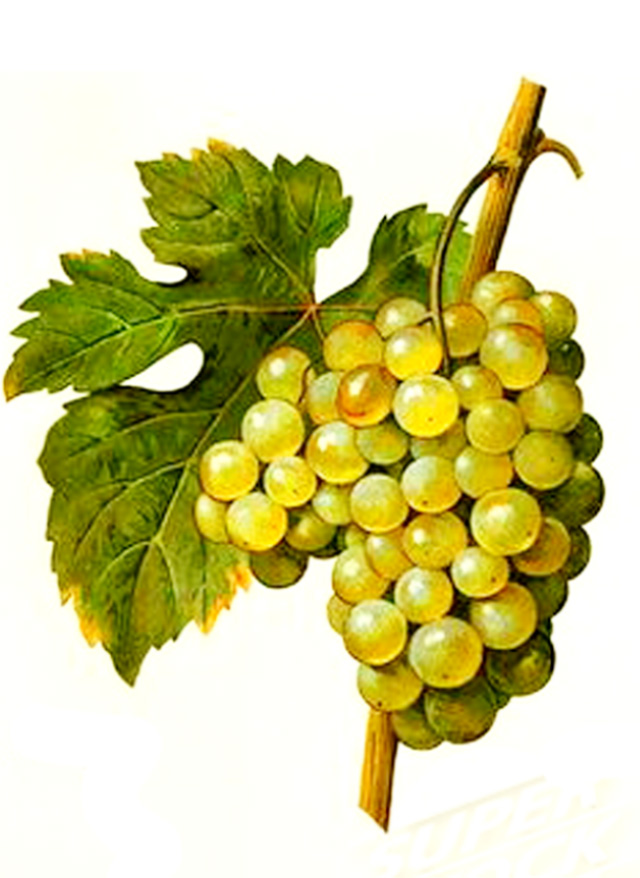
- Muscat Précoce de Saumur in Viala & Vermorel (as Muscat de Saumur)
- Color of berry skin: Blanc
- Species: Vitis vinifera
- Also called: Muscat de Saumur, Muscat de Courtiller and other synonyms
- Origin: France
- VIVC number: 8246

Muscat d'Eisenstadt (also known as Muscat de Saumur and Muscat Précoce de Saumur) is a white variety of grape of French origin. It was first cultivated in 1842 by Auguste Courtiller (1795–1875), who created it by selecting seedlings from a Pinot Noir Précoce vine with open pollination. Courtiller worked in the Jardin des Plantes of the city of Saumur. Muscat d'Eisenstadt shows very early ripening, which is indicated by the term "précoce" in its name. This property has made Muscat d'Eisenstadt popular to use as a crossing partner for many other grape varieties, including Huxelrebe and possibly including Muscat Ottonel.

== Synonyms ==
Muscat d'Eisenstadt is also known under the following synonyms: Blanc Précoce Musqué de Courtiller, Courtiller Musqué, Courtiller Précoce, Courtillier Muskat, Early Saumur Frontignan, Kurtie, Kurtile Rannii, Madeleine Musqué de Courtillier, Mouskat Soumjur, Muscat de Courtiller, Muscat de Saumur, Muscat Précoce de Courtiller, Précoce Blanc Musqué de Courtiller, Précoce de Courtiller, Précoce de Courtillier, Précoce de Saumur, Précoce Musqué, Précoce Musqué de Courtiller, Prekos de Kurtile.
