= Ahr (wine region) =

Wine region in Germany

Coordinates: 50.54°N 7.04°E

- Wine region
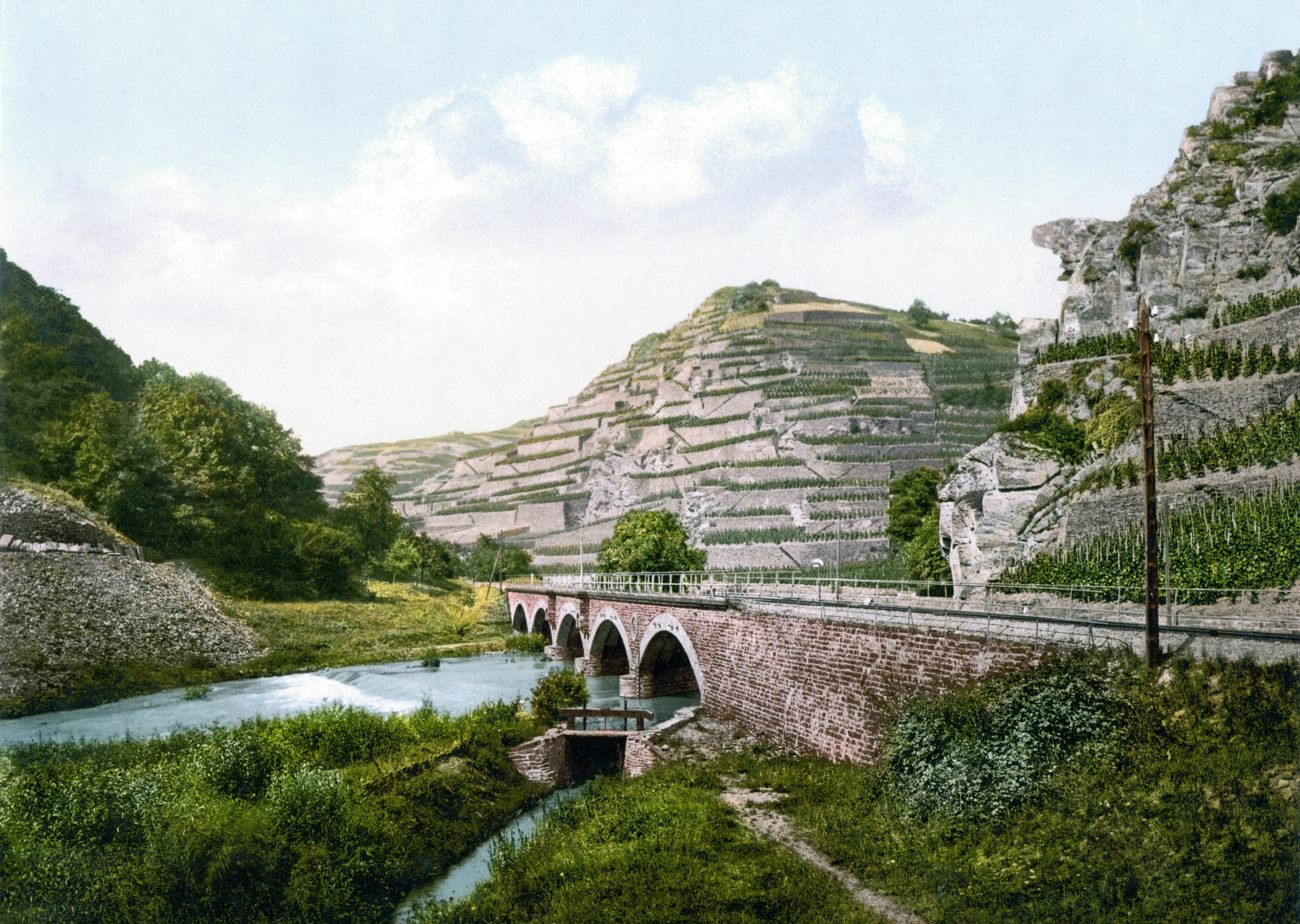
- Years of wine industry: c. AD 893
- Country: Germany
- Part of: Rhineland-Palatinate
- Size of planted vineyards: 539 ha (2010)
- Varietals produced: Riesling, Silvaner, Ruländer (Pinot gris), Kerner, Weißer Burgunder (Pinot blanc), Chardonnay, Ortega, Dornfelder, Spätburgunder (Pinot noir), Portugieser, Regent, Merlot, Dunkelfelder, Cabernet Sauvignon, Frühburgunder, Acolon, Cabernet Mitos
- Wine produced: 33,624 hl, 62.4 hl/ha

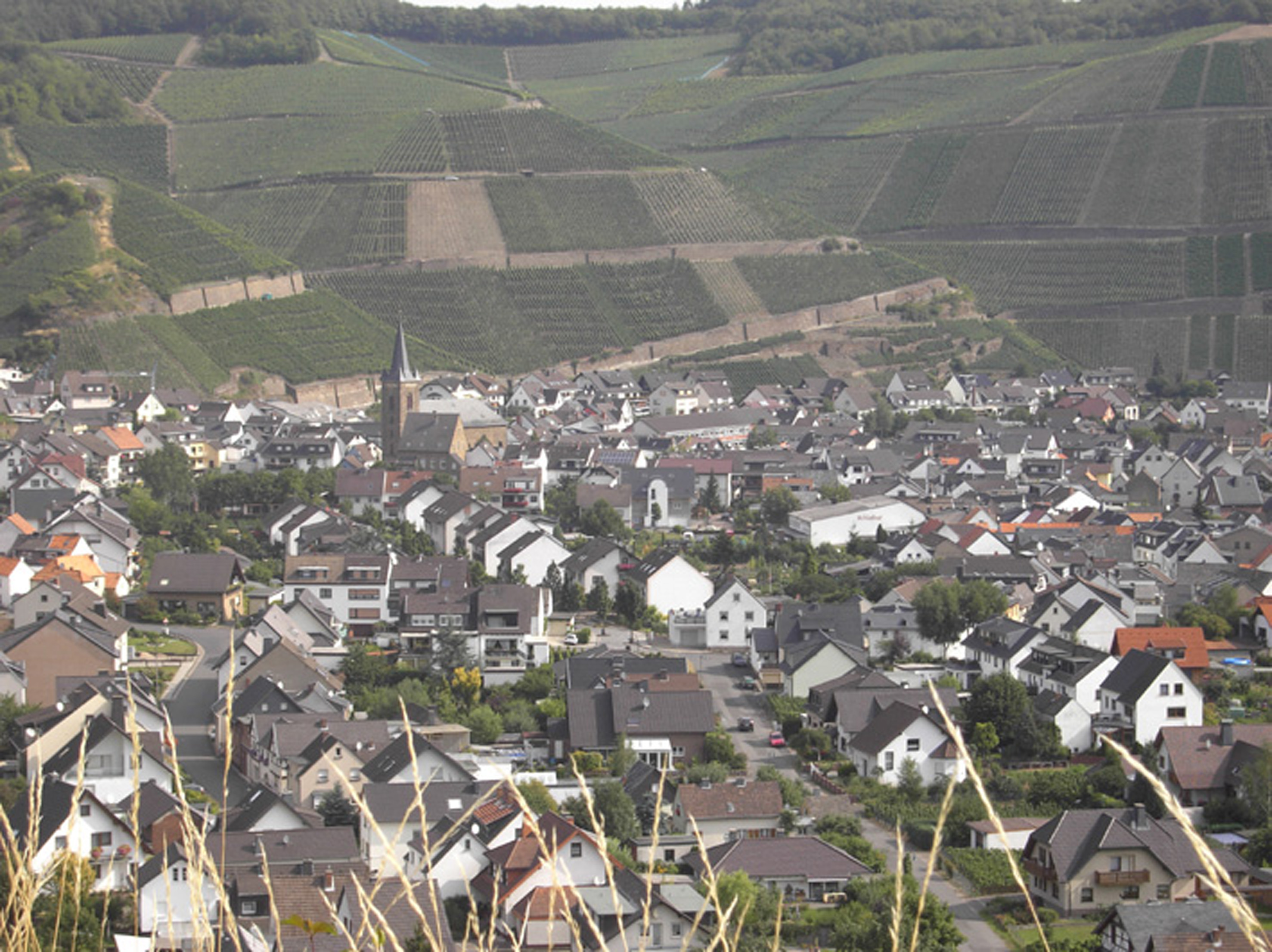
The village Dernau and Ahr vineyards.

Ahr is a wine region (Anbaugebiet) for quality wine in Germany, and is located in the valley of the river Ahr, a tributary of Rhine, and is situated in the federal state of Rhineland-Palatinate. With only 558 hectares (1,380 acres) of vines as of 2008, it is one of smaller of Germany's 13 regions. Despite its northern location (it is for example situated north of Mosel region) it primarily produces red wines, and red grape varieties account for 86% of the vineyard area, which is more than in any other German wine region.

== History ==
It is believed that vines were cultivated in the Ahr valley already in Roman times, as is the case with nearby Mosel, although definite documentary evidence to this effect seems to be lacking. However, a property list of the Benedictine Prüm Abbey drawn up in the year 893 AD, called the Prümer Urbar, lists vineyards in eight Ahr locations, so at least at this time, winemaking in the Ahr region was established.

During the 2021 European floods, about 10 % of the vineyards were destroyed. The flood hit viticulture on the Ahr with unimaginable force. The damage was even more severe in the wineries, cellars and cooperatives located in the lower-lying areas of the Ahr.

== Geography and climate ==
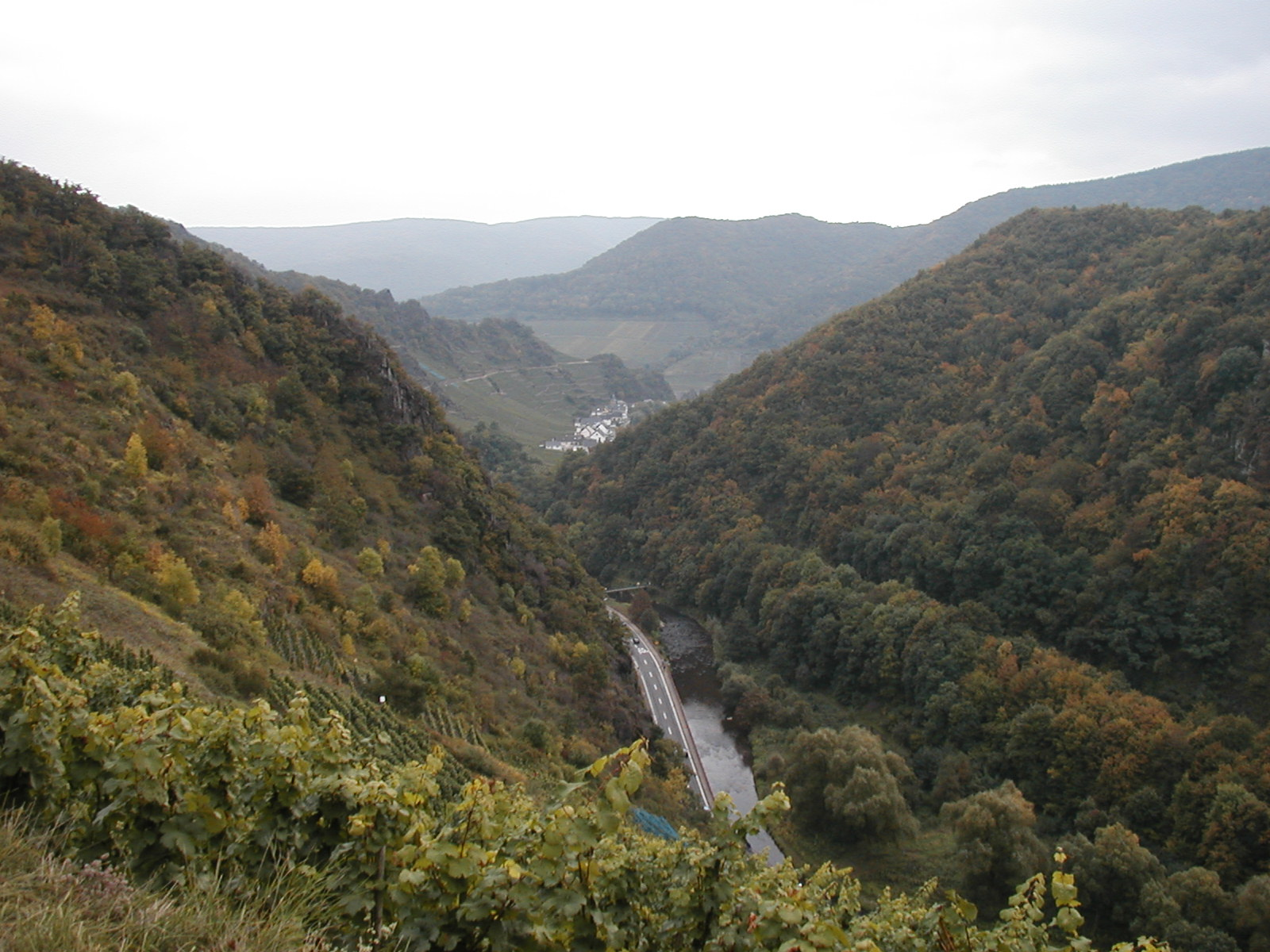
The narrow Ahr river valley is responsible for the region's favoured mesoclimate.

Situated between 50° and 51° north, Ahr is the world's most northern region dominated by red wine grapes. So far north, very good sites with a warm microclimate are needed to properly ripen red wine grapes, and the Ahr vineyards are said to have a "Mediterranean" microclimate. Most vineyards are located on terraced slopes facing southwest to southeast along the middle and lower portions of river Ahr, over a stretch of 25 kilometers, from Altenahr to the Rhine. The wine-growing parts of the Ahr valley enjoy protection from the Eifel mountains resulting in a favoured mesoclimate.

Soils vary between slate, basalt and greywacke clay of volcanic origin.

Ahr consists of a single district (Bereich) called Walporzheim-Ahrtal, only one collective vineyard site (Großlage) called Klosterberg, and 43 single vineyard sites.

== Grape varieties ==
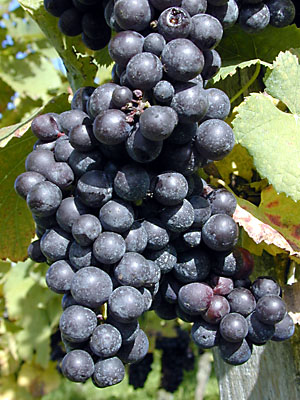
Spätburgunder, outside Germany more commonly known as Pinot noir, is the dominant grape variety of the Ahr wine region.

Ahr grows a higher proportion of the much-appreciated Spätburgunder (Pinot noir) than any other German wine region.

Leading grape varieties Ahr (update 2022)
Variety	Colour	Synonym	Area (%)	Area (ha)
1. Spätburgunder	red	Pinot Noir	64,3	340
2. Riesling	white		8,7	46
3. Frühburgunder	red	Pinot Madeleine, Klevner	5,9	31
4. Weißer Burgunder	white	Klevner, Pinot Blanc	4,0	21
5. Regent	red		2,8	15

== Wine style ==
While Ahr primarily grew red wine before the current red wine trend in Germany, until the 1980s the wines were almost invariably very light-colored, bordering on rosé, and often were significantly sweet. While this style of wine was perhaps rather unimpressive by international standards, Ahr could rely on its vicinity to the populous Ruhr Area to sell its small production to weekend tourists. In the 1980s, Werner Näkel of Weingut Meyer-Näkel started to experiment with extended maceration and a significant influence of oak, which then was a style of red wine which hardly existed in Germany. After his wines won their first award in 1989, his style was followed by many other Ahr wineries as well as in other German regions. This style is now firmly established as the style of the best wines of the top Ahr producers: dry, fairly tannic and with a heavy oak influence. In comparison with Pinot noir wines of Burgundy, Ahr wines tend to have a paler red color and being more oak-dominated.

The top red wines used to be classified as dry (trocken) Auslese, but nowadays they are either called Grosses Gewächs or are classified as plain Qualitätswein bestimmter Anbaugebiete and are sold under estate-specific wine names.

The best red wines of Ahr are quite expensive, and are routinely priced significantly higher than Germany's top dry Rieslings. Prices in excess of 50 euro are not uncommon for the top of the range at more well-known producers, although cheaper entry wines also are produced. Due to the limited production, and the high domestic demand for red wines in Germany, Ahr wines have only limited international (export) availability.
