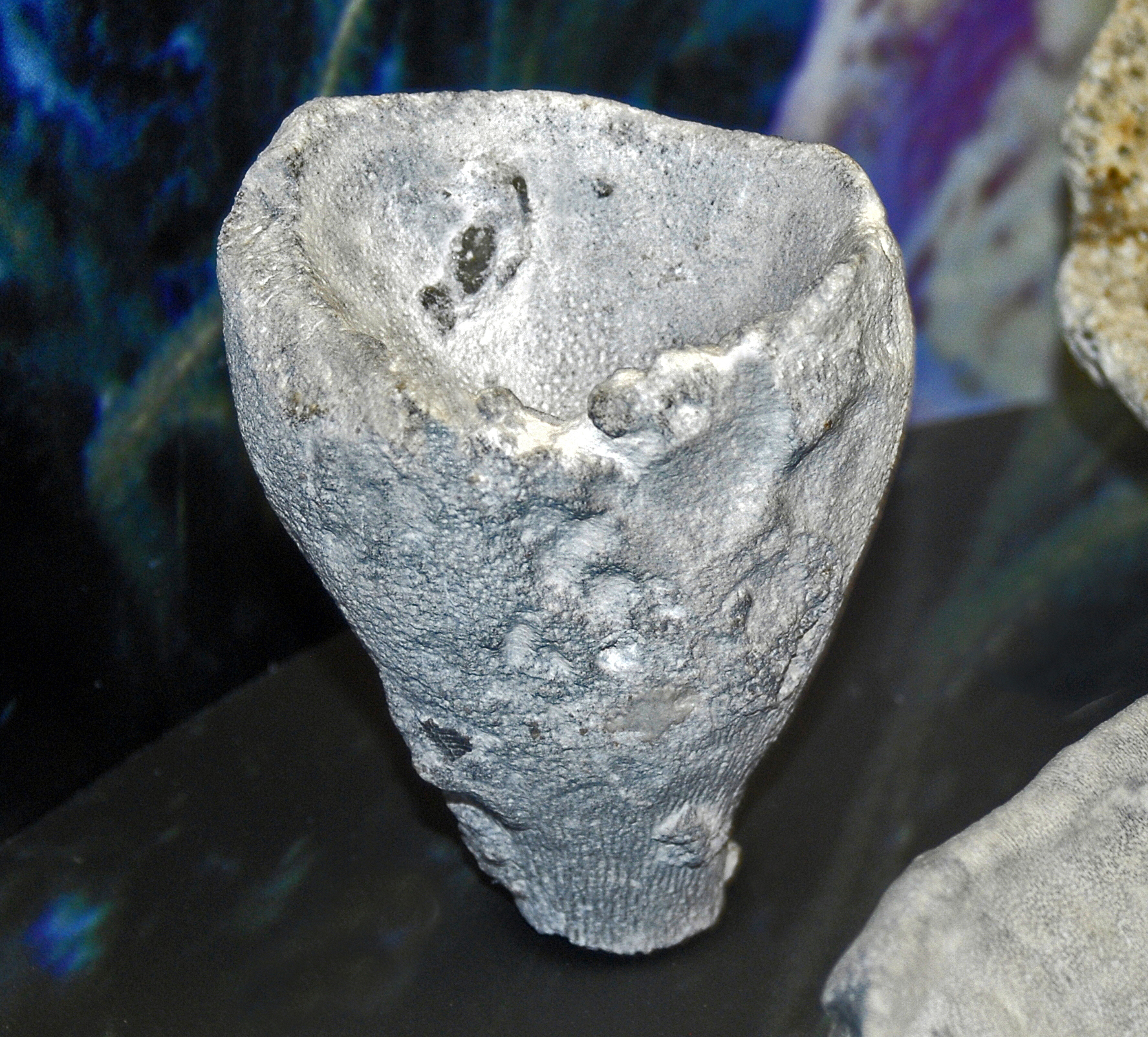
- Fossil of Cupulina elata from France

Scientific classification
- Kingdom: Animalia
- Phylum: Porifera
- Class: Demospongiae
- Subclass: Lithistida
- Genus: †Cupulina; Courtiller, 1861

= Cupulina =

Cupulina Temporal range: Upper Cretaceous

Extinct genus of sponges

Cupulina is an extinct genus of sea sponges belonging to the class Demospongiae.
