= Pinot noir =

Red wine grape variety

- Grape (Vitis)
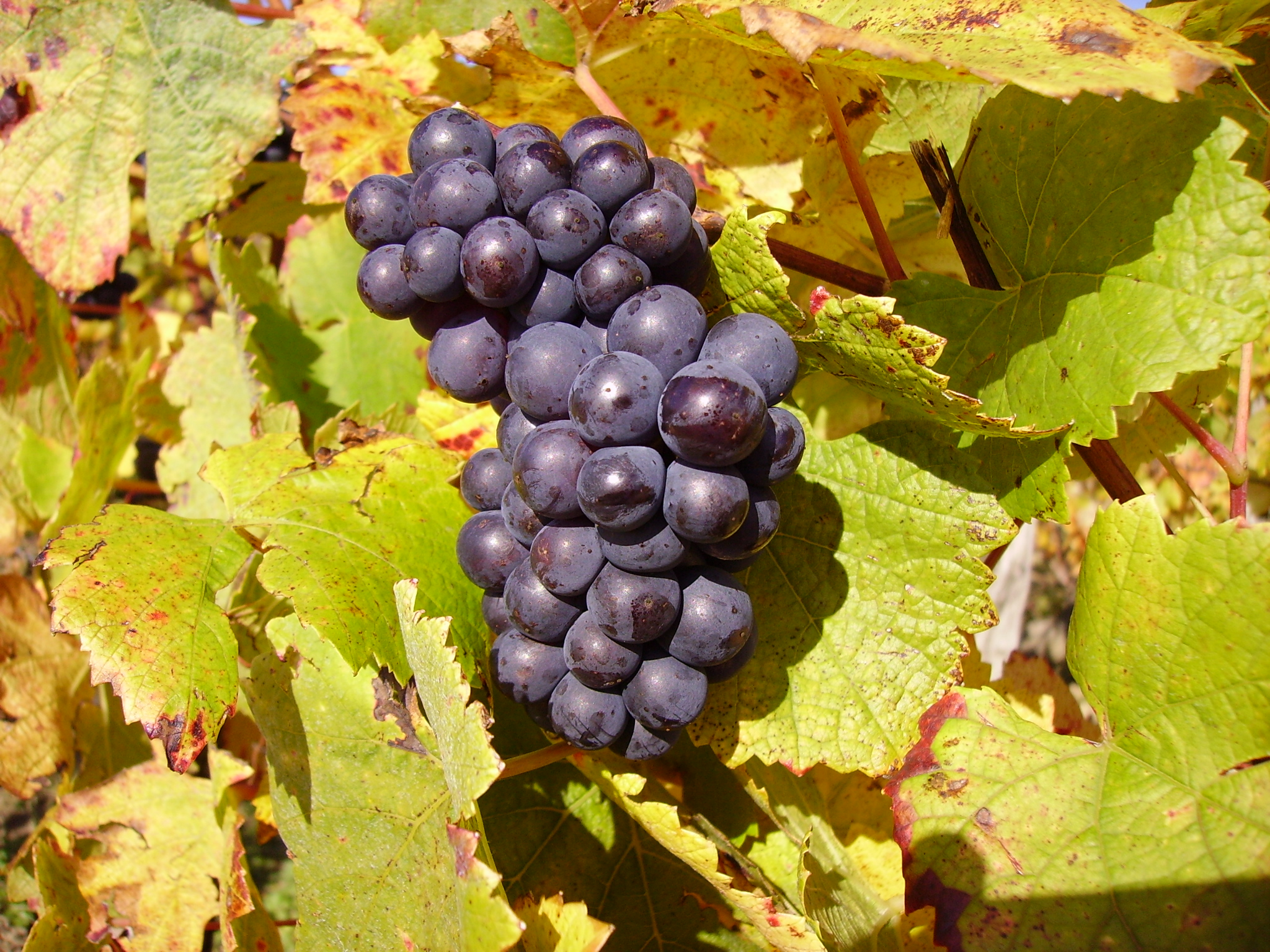
- Pinot noir grapes in Bué, Centre-Val de Loire, France
- Color of berry skin: Black
- Also called: Blauburgunder, Spätburgunder, Rulandské modré, Pinot nero, other synonyms
- Notable regions: France; Burgundy; Champagne; United States; Santa Barbara Region; Santa Cruz Mountains; Russian River Valley; Willamette Valley; New Zealand; Central Otago; Marlborough; Martinborough; Waitaki Valley; Australia (Adelaide Hills); Tasmania; Mornington Peninsula; Yarra Valley; Romania; Germany (Ahr); Chile (Casablanca Valley); Canada (Okanagan Valley); England (Rother Valley); South Africa (Elgin)
- Notable wines: Gevrey-Chambertin, Nuits-Saint-Georges
- Ideal soil: Chalky clay
- VIVC number: 9279

Wine characteristics
- General: Light tannins
- Cool climate: Cabbage, wet leaves
- Medium climate: Strawberry, raspberry, cherry, mushroom, meaty

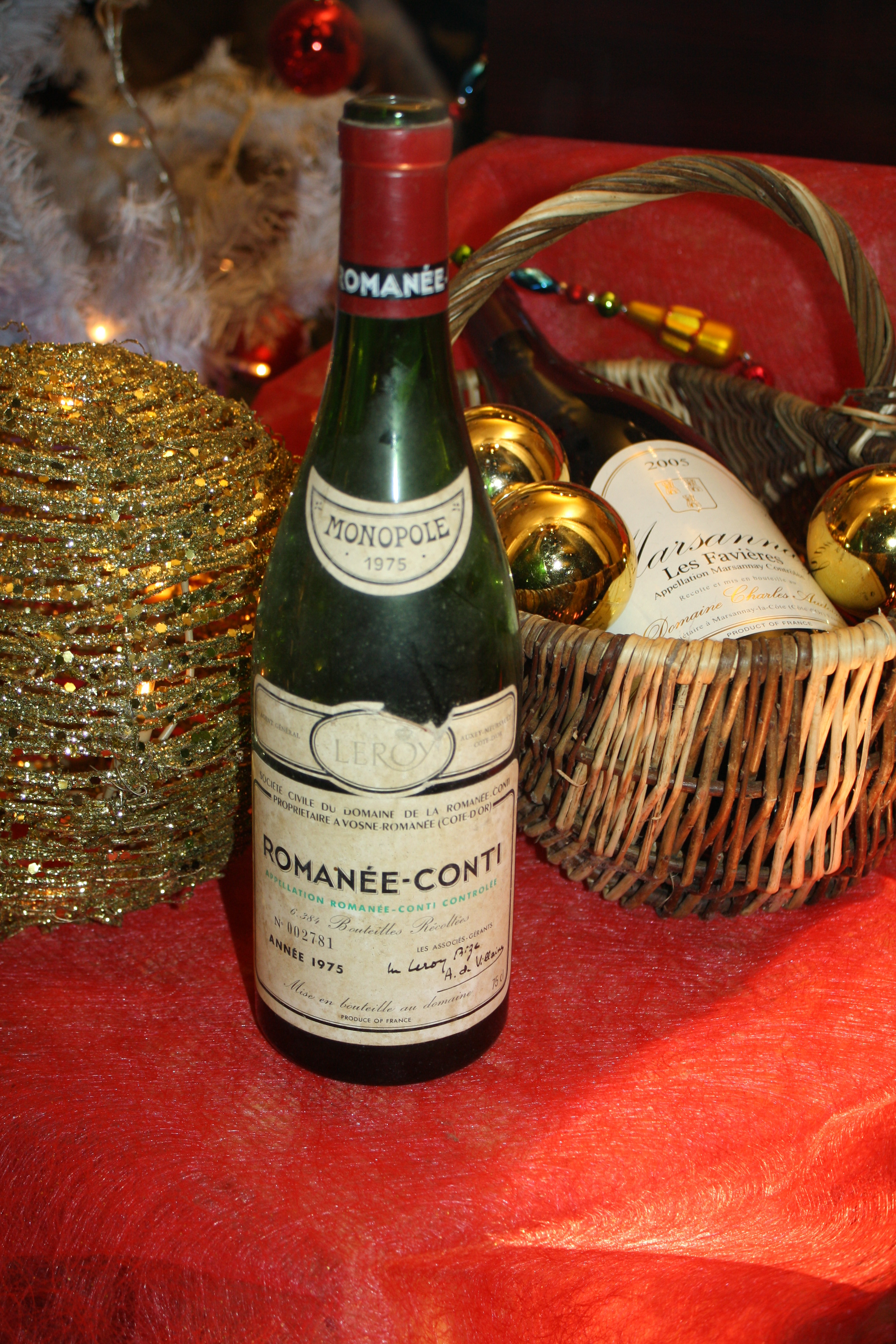
Romanée-Conti, among the world's most expensive wines, is made from Pinot noir.

Pinot noir (English: /ˌpiːnoʊ ˈnwɑːr/, French: [pino nwaʁ]), also known as Pinot nero, and Spätburgunder is a red-wine grape variety of the species Vitis vinifera. The name also refers to wines created predominantly from Pinot noir grapes. The name is derived from the French words for pine and black. The word pine alludes to the grape variety having tightly clustered, pinecone-shaped bunches of fruit.

Pinot noir is grown around the world, mostly in cooler climates, and the variety is chiefly associated with the Burgundy region of France. Pinot noir is now used to make red wines around the world, as well as Champagne, and sparkling white wines such as the Italian Franciacorta, along with English sparkling wines. Regions that have gained a reputation for red Pinot noir wines include the Willamette Valley of Oregon; Carneros in Napa and Sonoma, Central Coast, Sonoma Coast, and Russian River AVAs of California; the Elgin and Walker Bay wine regions of South Africa; the Mornington Peninsula, Adelaide Hills, Great Southern, Tasmania, and Yarra Valley in Australia; and the Central Otago, Martinborough, Marlborough and Waitaki Valley wine regions of New Zealand. Pinot noir is the most planted varietal (38%) used in sparkling wine production in Champagne and other wine regions.

Pinot noir is a difficult variety to cultivate and transform into wine. The grape's tendency to produce tightly packed clusters makes it susceptible to several viticultural hazards involving rot that require diligent canopy management.

The thin skins and low levels of phenolic compounds lend pinot to producing mostly lightly colored, medium-bodied and low-tannin wines that can often go through phases of uneven and unpredictable aging. When young, wines made from Pinot noir tend to have red fruit aromas of cherries, raspberries, and strawberries. As the wine ages, Pinot has the potential to develop more vegetal and "barnyard" aromas that can contribute to the complexity of the wine.

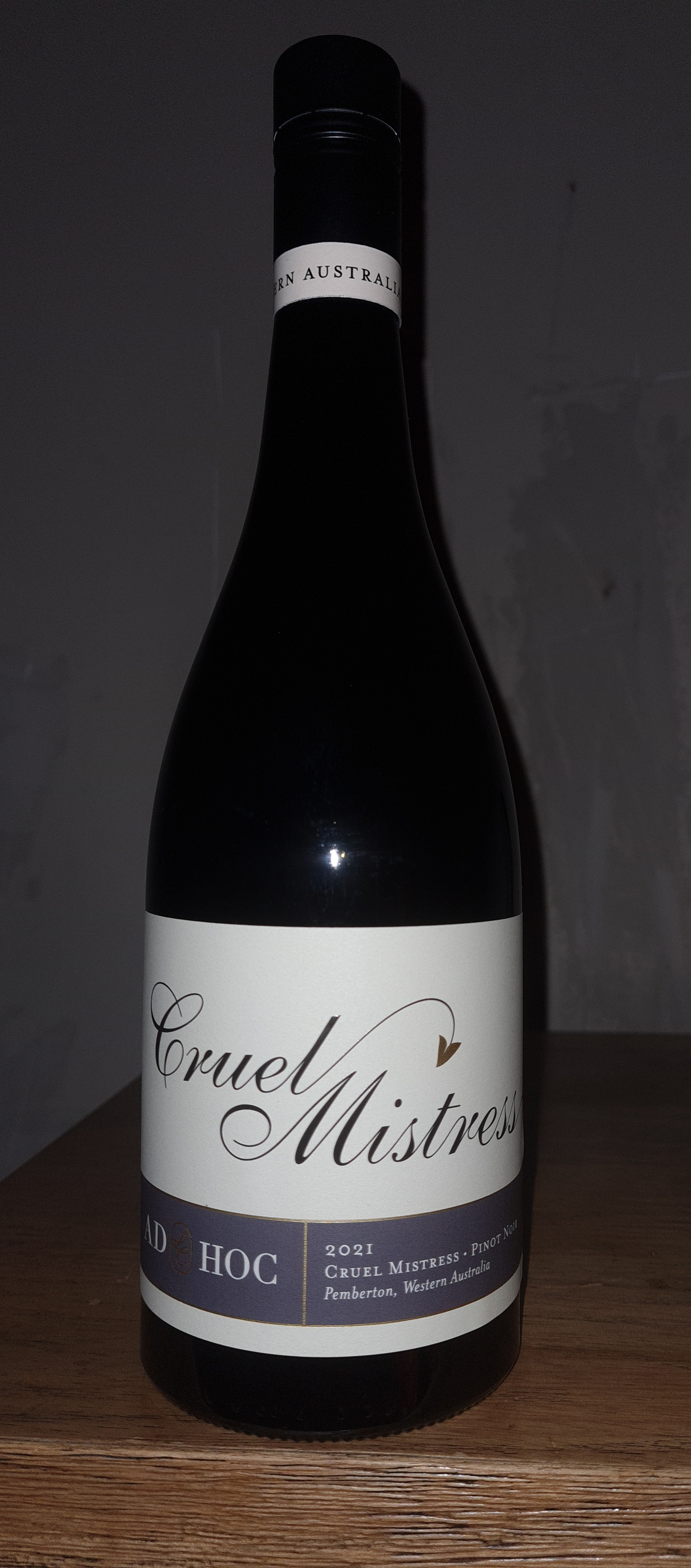
Cruel Mistress is an Australian Pinot noir from Pemberton in the state of Western Australia.

== Description ==
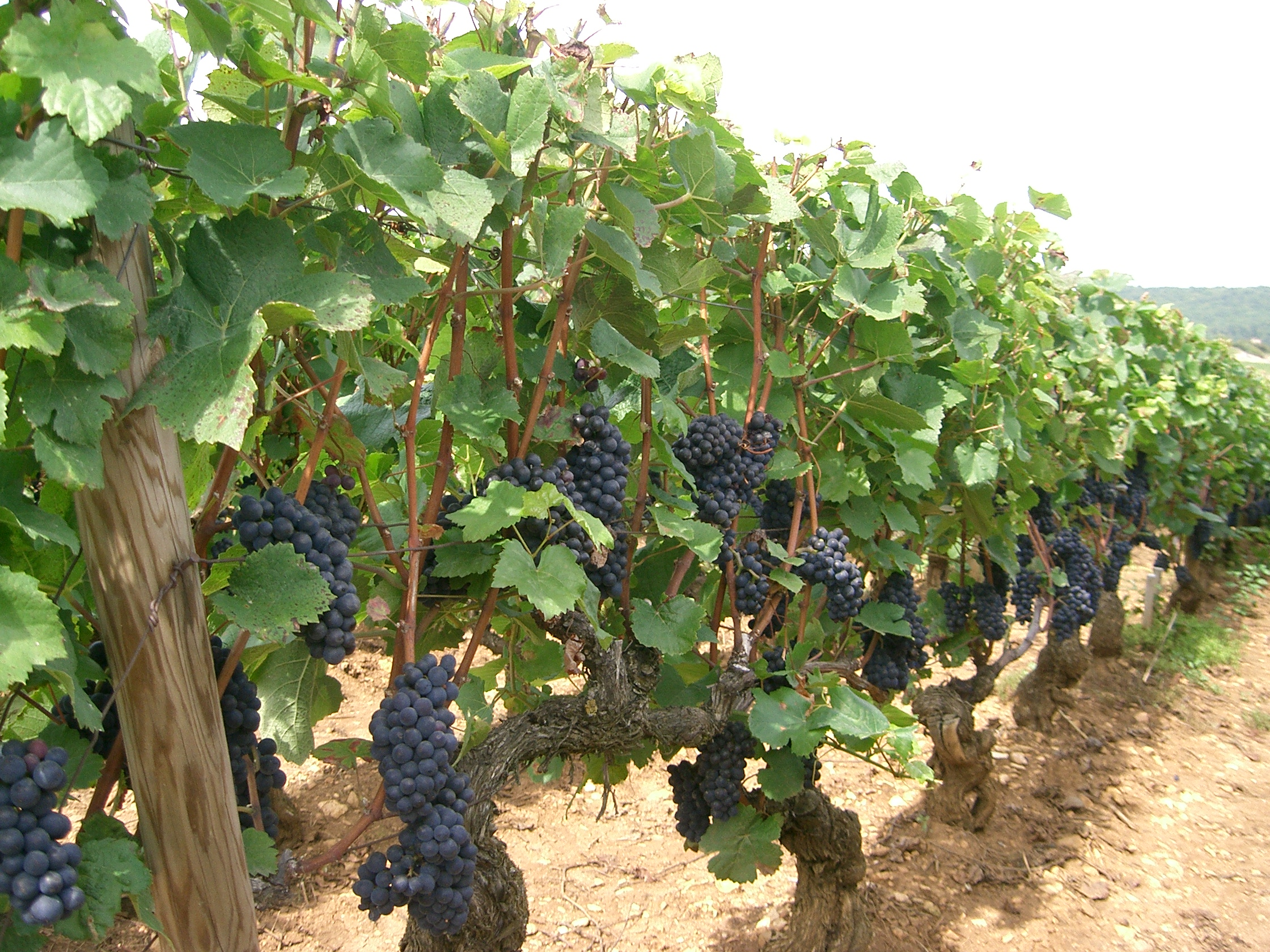
Pinot noir grapes at Santenay, in Burgundy

Pinot noir's home is France's Burgundy region, particularly Côte-d'Or. It is also planted in Argentina, Australia, Austria, Bulgaria, Canada, Chile, northern parts of Croatia, Czech Republic, England, the Republic of Georgia, Germany, Greece, Israel, Italy, Hungary, Albania, Kosovo, North Macedonia, Moldova, New Zealand, Romania, Serbia, Slovakia, Slovenia, South Africa, Switzerland, Ukraine, United States, and Uruguay. The United States has increasingly become a major Pinot noir producer, with some of the best regarded coming from Oregon's Willamette Valley, and California's Sonoma County with its Russian River Valley and Sonoma Coast appellations. Lesser-known appellations are found in Mendocino County's Anderson Valley, the Central Coast's Santa Lucia Highlands appellation, the Santa Maria Valley, and Sta. Rita Hills American Viticulture Area in Santa Barbara County. In New Zealand, it is principally grown in Martinborough, Marlborough, Waipara, and Central Otago. Smaller plantings are found in the Waitaki Valley of North Otago.

The leaves of Pinot noir are generally smaller than those of Cabernet Sauvignon or Syrah. The vine is typically less vigorous than either of these varieties. The grape cluster is small and conico-cylindrical, shaped like a pinecone. Some viticultural historians believe this shape similarity may have given rise to the name. In the vineyard, Pinot noir is sensitive to wind and frost, cropping levels (it must be low yielding for the production of quality wines), soil types, and pruning techniques. In the winery, it is sensitive to fermentation methods and yeast strains and is highly reflective of its terroir, with different regions producing very different wines. Its thin skin makes it susceptible to bunch rot and similar fungal diseases. The vines themselves are susceptible to powdery mildew, especially in Burgundy infection by leaf roll, and fanleaf viruses cause significant vine health problems. These complications have given the grape a reputation for being difficult to grow: Jancis Robinson calls pinot a "minx of a vine" and André Tchelistcheff declared that "God made cabernet sauvignon whereas the devil made Pinot noir". It is much less tolerant of harsh vineyard conditions than the likes of Cabernet Sauvignon, Syrah, Merlot or Grenache.

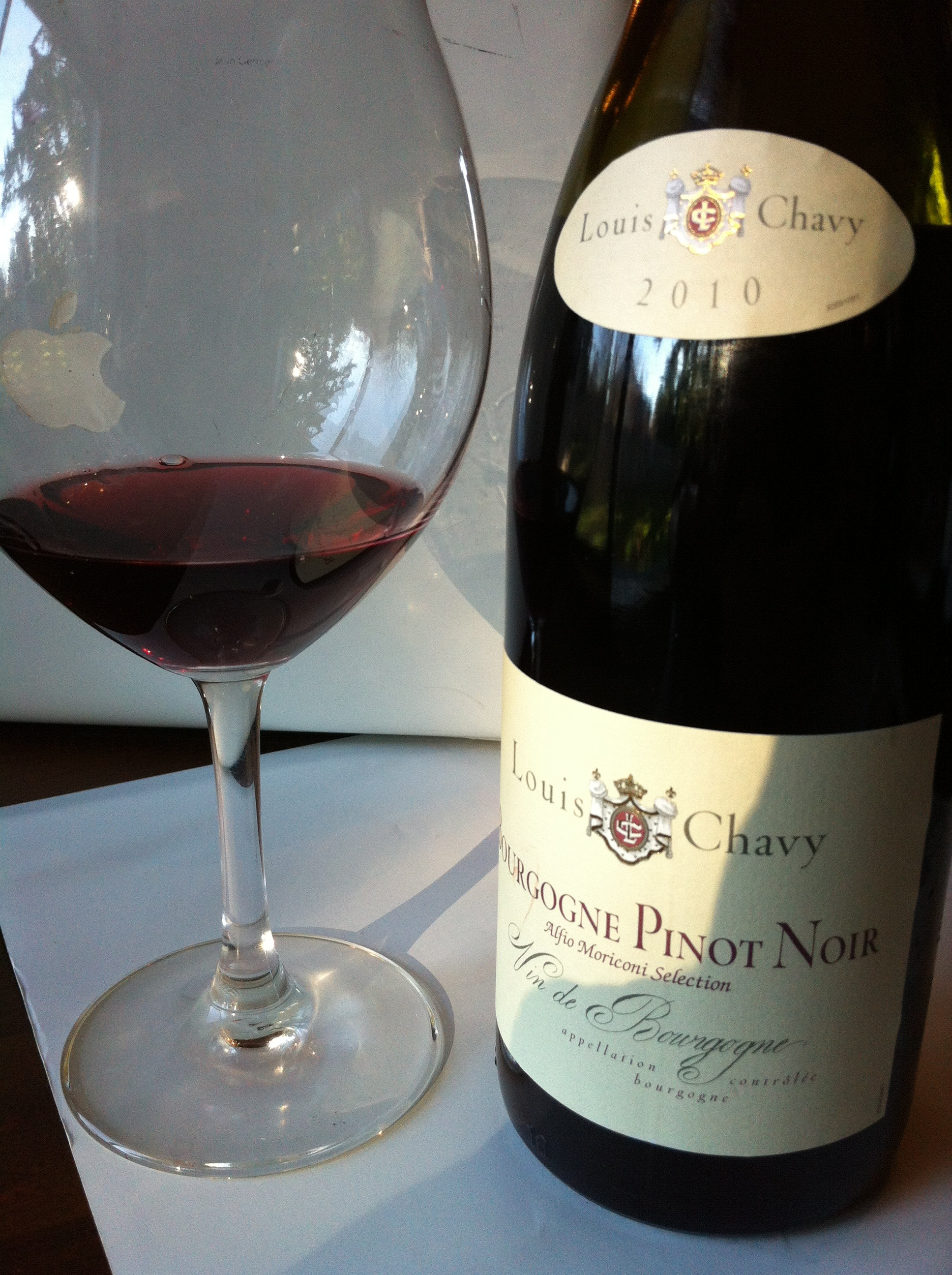
A Burgundy Pinot noir

However, Pinot noir wines are among the most popular in the world. Joel L. Fleishman of Vanity Fair describes them as "the most romantic of wines, with so voluptuous a perfume, so sweet an edge, and so powerful a punch that, like falling in love, they make the blood run hot and the soul wax embarrassingly poetic". Master Sommelier Madeline Triffon calls them "sex in a glass".

The tremendously broad range of bouquets, flavors, textures, and impressions that Pinot noir can produce sometimes confuses tasters. Broadly, the wines tend to be of light to medium body with an aroma reminiscent of black and/or red cherry, raspberry and to a lesser extent currant and many other fine small red and black berry fruits. Traditional red Burgundy is famous for its savory fleshiness and "farmyard" aromas (this latter is sometimes associated with thiol and other reductive characters), but changing fashions, modern winemaking techniques, and new easier-to-grow clones have favored a lighter, more fruit-prominent, cleaner style.

The wine's color, when young, is often compared to that of garnet, frequently being much lighter than that of other red wines. This is entirely natural and not a winemaking fault, as Pinot noir has a lower skin anthocyanin (coloring matter) content than most other classical red/black varieties. Callistephin, the 3-O-glucoside of pelargonidin, an orange-colored anthocyanidin, is also found in the berry skins of Pinot noir.

However, an emerging style from California and New Zealand highlights a more fruit-forward, stronger-flavored and darker wine that can tend toward Syrah (or even new world Malbec) in depth, extract, and alcoholic content.

Pinot noir is also used in the production of Champagne (usually along with Chardonnay and Pinot Meunier) and is planted in most of the world's wine-growing regions for use in both still and sparkling wines. Pinot noir grown for dry table wines is generally low-yielding and of lesser vigor than many other varieties, whereas when grown for use in sparkling wines (e.g., Champagne), it is generally cropped at significantly higher yields.

In addition to being used for the production of sparkling and still red wine, Pinot noir is also sometimes used for rosé still wines, Beaujolais Nouveau-style wines, and even vin gris white wines. Its juice is uncolored.

== History, mutants and clones ==
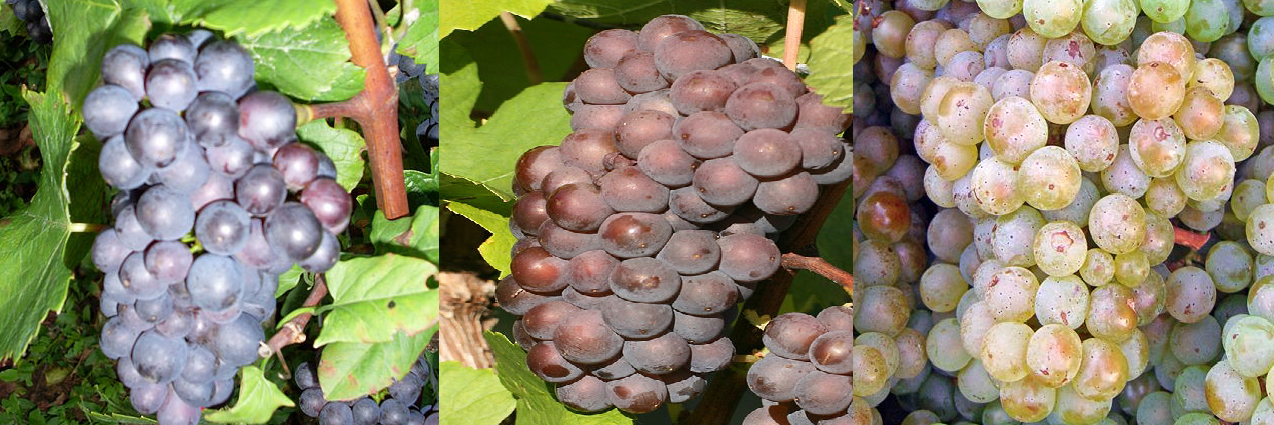
Pinot gris (center) and Pinot blanc (right) are color mutations of Pinot noir (left).

Pinot noir is almost certainly a very ancient variety that may be only one or two generations removed from wild Vitis sylvestris vines. Its origins are nevertheless unclear: In De re rustica, Columella describes a grape variety similar to Pinot noir in Burgundy during the 1st century CE; however, vines have grown wild as far north as Belgium in the days before phylloxera, and it is possible that pinot represents a direct domestication of (hermaphrodite-flowered) Vitis sylvestris.

Archaeological evidence of the variety's presence in France was further solidified by a 2021 excavation at the Great Hospital in Château-Thierry. In 2026, DNA analysis of grape seeds recovered from a 15th-century hospital latrine confirmed they were genetically identical to modern Pinot noir, proving the variety has remained virtually unchanged for at least 600 years.

Ferdinand Regner argued that Pinot noir is a cross between Pinot Meunier (Schwarzriesling) and Traminer, but this claim has since been refuted. In fact, Pinot Meunier has been shown to be a chimerical mutation (in the epidermal cells) which makes the shoot tips and leaves prominently hairy-white and the vine a little smaller and early ripening. Thus, Pinot Meunier is a chimera with two tissue layers of different genetic makeup, both of which contain a mutation making them non-identical to, and mutations of, Pinot noir (as well as of any of the other color forms of pinot). As such, Pinot Meunier cannot be a parent of Pinot noir, and, indeed, it seems likely that chimerical mutations which can generate Pinot gris from other pinot (principally blanc or noir) may in turn, be the genetic pathway for the emergence of Pinot Meunier.

Pinot gris is a pinot color sport (and can arise by mutation of Pinot noir or Pinot blanc), presumably representing a somatic mutation in either the VvMYBA1 or VvMYBA2 genes that control grape berry color. Pinot blanc is a further mutation and can either naturally arise from or give rise to Pinot gris or Pinot noir; the mutation-reversion path is multi-directional, therefore. The general DNA profiles of both Pinot gris and blanc are identical to Pinot noir; and other Pinots, Pinot mour, and Pinot teinturier are also genetically similarly close. Almost any given Pinot (of whatever berry color) can occur as a complete mutation or as a chimera of almost any other pinot. As such, suggestions that Pinot noir is the fundamental and original form of the Pinots are both misleading and highly tendentious. Indeed, if anything, Pinot blanc may be the original human-selected form of Pinot, although given the genetic variability of this longstanding genetic line, thinking of Pinot as a familial cluster of grapes sharing a fundamental and common genetic core is almost certainly nearest the truth. It is this core around which the sub-varietally identifying color variations (blanc, rouge, noir, gris, rose, violet, tenteurier, moure, etc.) occur, along with the more striking chimeric morphological mutation that is Pinot Meunier, and the interesting further mutations of this variety as Pinot Meunier gris and as the non-hairy mutation which the Germans classify as 'Samtrot' (effectively 'Pinot red velvet').

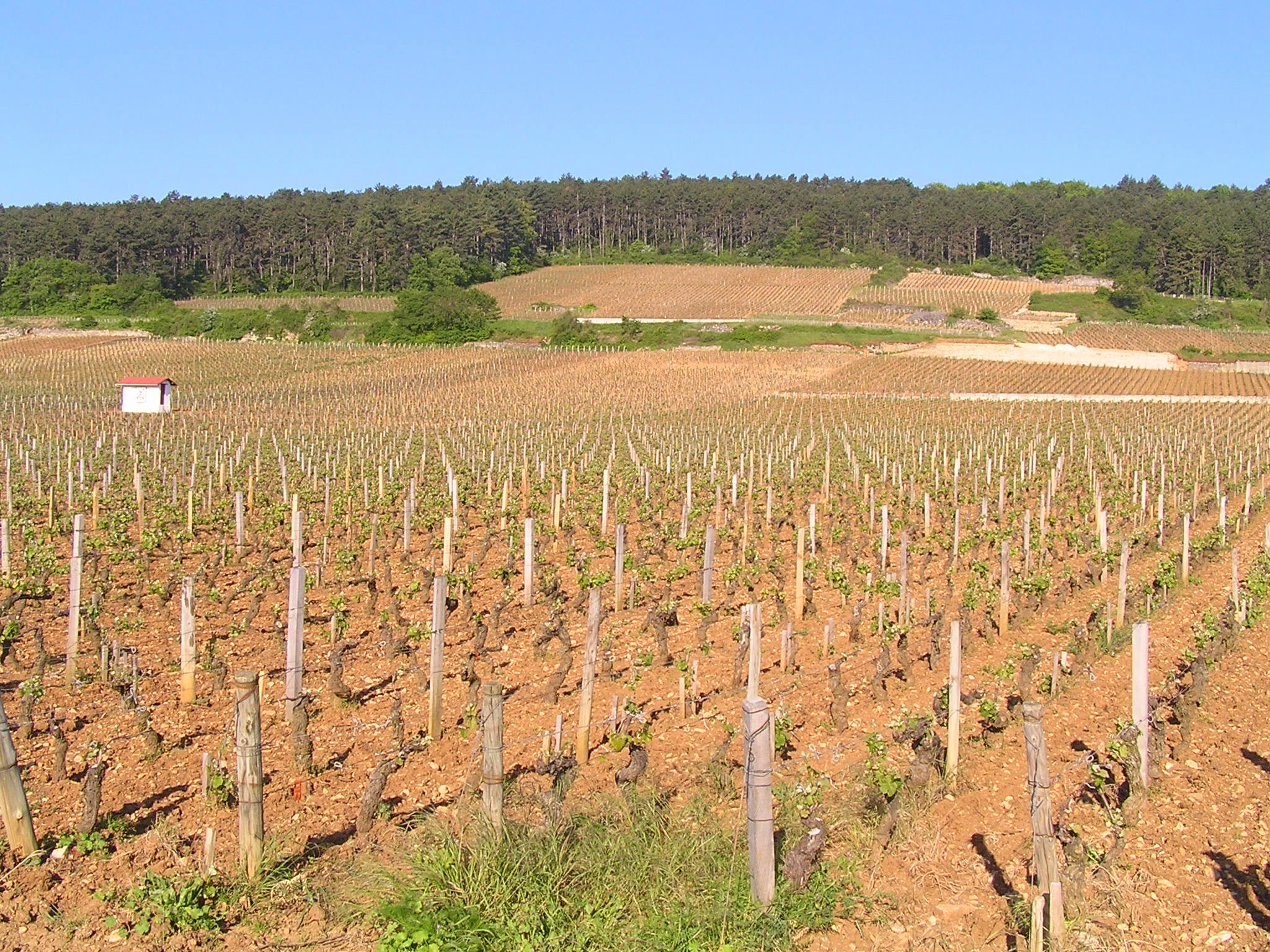
Pinot noir vines at Clos de Bèze, Gevrey-Chambertin, on Burgundy's Côte d'Or

A white berried sport of Pinot noir was propagated in 1936 by Henri Gouges of Burgundy, and there is now 2.5ha planted of this grape which Clive Coates calls Pinot Gouges, and others call Pinot Musigny. There is, however, no published evidence, nor any obvious reason, to believe that this is other than a (possibly quite fine) form of Pinot blanc, having simply arisen as a selected natural mutation of the original Pinot noir in the Gouges' vineyard.

In the UK, the name 'Wrotham Pinot' is a permitted synonym for Pinot Meunier and stems from a vine that one of the pioneers of UK viticulture, Edward Hyams, discovered in Wrotham (pronounced 'root-am' or 'root-em') in Kent in the late 1940s. It was, in all probability, the variety known as 'Miller's Burgundy,' which had been widely grown on walls and in gardens in Great Britain for many years. Archibald Barron writing in his book, Vines and Vine Culture, the standard Victorian work on grape growing in the UK, states that the 'Millers Burgundy' also was found by [the famous horticulturalist] Sir Joseph Banks in the remains of an ancient vineyard at Tortworth, Gloucestershire – a county well known for its medieval vineyards. Hyams took the vine to Raymond Barrington Brock, who ran what was to become the Oxted Viticultural Research Station, and he trialed it alongside the many other varieties he grew. Brock said that when compared to supplies of Meunier from France, Wrotham Pinot: had a higher natural sugar content and ripened two weeks earlier. Hyams, ever the journalist in search of a good story, claimed that this vine had been left behind by the Romans, although he provided absolutely no evidence for this. Brock sold cuttings of 'Wrotham Pinot,' and the variety became quite popular in early English "revival" vineyards in the late twentieth century, although it is unlikely that many vines from the cuttings supplied by Brock survive in any present UK vineyards. Indeed, despite the fact that today virtually all plantings of Meunier in the UK stem from French and German nurseries, the name Wrotham Pinot is still a legally acceptable synonym for this variety, although little, if ever, used by UK growers.

Pinot noir can be particularly prone to mutation (suggesting it has active transposable elements), and thanks to its long history in cultivation, there are hundreds of different clones in vineyards and vine collections worldwide. More than 50 are officially recognized in France compared to only 25 of the much more widely planted Cabernet Sauvignon. The French Etablissement National Technique pour l'Amelioration de la Viticulture (ENTAV) has set up a program to select the best clones of Pinot. This program has succeeded in increasing the number of quality clones available to growers. In the new world, particularly in Oregon, wines of extraordinary quality continue to be made from the (ex-University of California at Davis) Pommard (principally UCD4) and Wadensvil (UCD 1A and/or 2A) clones.

Gamay Beaujolais is a Californian misnomer for a UCD clone series of upright-growing ('Pinot Droit') Pinot noir. Planted mostly in California it also became established in New Zealand. In New Zealand, its disposition to poor fruit set in cool-flowering conditions can be problematic. It has been claimed that the 'Gamay Beaujolais' Pinot noir was brought to California by Paul Masson. But it was collected in France by Harold Olmo for UCD in the 1950s and was one of the first Pinot Noir vines this institution offered as a high-health clonal line from about 1962 onward. However, it was misleadingly identified at UCD as a 'Gamay Beaujolais' type (of Pinot noir). In general, these upright growing 'Pinot Droit' clones are highly productive (in suitable, hot-to-warm, flowering conditions) and in California and New Zealand, they produce robust, broad-shouldered wines. In Burgundy, the use of Pinot Droit clones is reportedly still widespread in inferior, Village appellation, or even non-appellation vineyards, and Pinot Droit is consequently regarded, arguably with very good reason, as a (genetic) sub-form significantly inferior to classical, decumbent, 'Pinot fine' or 'Pinot tordu', clonal lines of Pinot.

Frühburgunder (Pinot Noir Précoce) is an early-ripening form of Pinot noir. Across the Pinot family, ripening in typical climates can be dispersed by as much as four, and even six weeks between the very earliest (including Précoce) clones and the very latest ripening. Virus infection and excessive cropping significantly add to the delaying of Pinot noir ripening.

Gouget noir is sometimes confused as being a clone of Pinot noir but, DNA analysis has confirmed that it is a distinct variety.

In August 2007, a consortium of researchers, announced the sequencing of the genome of Pinot noir. It is the first fruit crop to be sequenced, and only the fourth flowering plant.

== Crosses ==
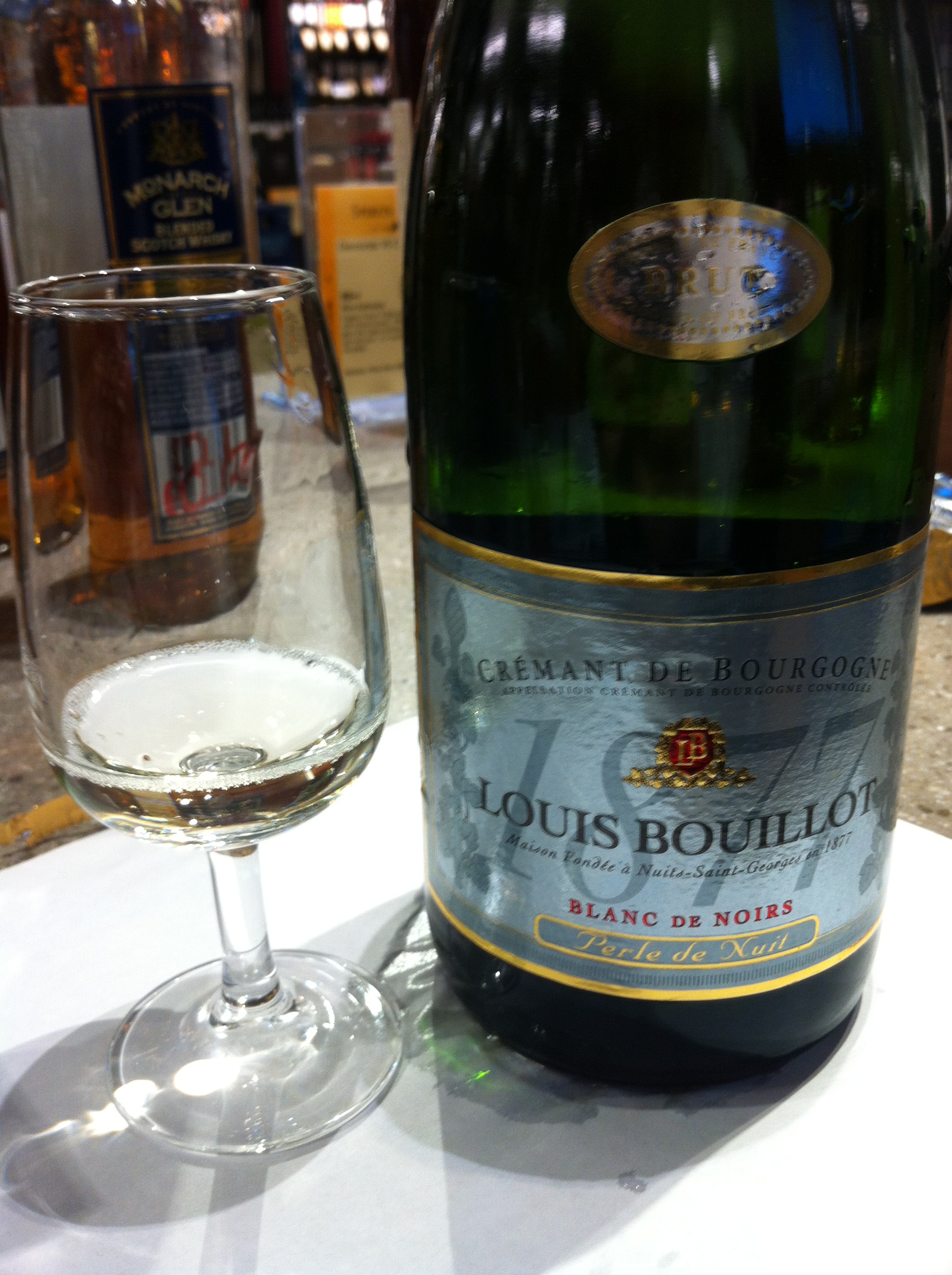
A sparkling Crémant de Bourgogne Blanc de Noirs (white from blacks) made from Pinot noir and Gamay

In the Middle Ages, the nobility and church of northeast France grew some form of Pinot in favored plots, while peasants grew a large amount of the much more productive, but otherwise distinctly inferior, Gouais blanc. Cross-pollination may have resulted from such close proximity, with the genetic distance between the two parents imparting hybrid vigor leading to the viticultural selection of a diverse range of offspring from this cross (which may, nevertheless, have also resulted from deliberate human intervention). In any case, however, it occurred; offspring of the Pinot–Gouais cross include: Chardonnay, Aligoté, Auxerrois, Gamay, Melon and eleven others. Pinot noir was not necessarily the Pinot involved here; any member of the Pinot family appears genetically capable of being the Pinot parent to these ex-Gouais crosses.

In 1925, Pinot noir was crossed in South Africa with the Cinsaut grape (known locally by the misnomer 'Hermitage') to create a unique variety called Pinotage.

== Regions ==
=== Argentina ===
Pinot noir is produced in the wine-growing regions of Mendoza (particularly in the Uco Valley), Patagonia, Neuquén Province and Río Negro Province.

=== Australia ===
Pinot noir is produced in several wine-growing areas of Australia, notably in the Southern Highlands in New South Wales, Yarra Valley, Geelong, the Bellarine Peninsula, Beechworth, South Gippsland, Sunbury, Macedon Ranges and Mornington Peninsula in Victoria, Adelaide Hills in South Australia, Great Southern Wine Region in Western Australia, all Tasmania, and the Canberra District in the Australian Capital Territory.

Best's Wines in Great Western has what is believed to have some of the world's oldest Pinot noir plantings—having survived phylloxera, these vines were planted in 1868.

=== Austria ===
In Austria, Pinot noir is often called Blauburgunder (literally Blue Burgundy) and produced in Burgenland and Lower Austria. Austrian Pinot noir wines are dry red wines similar in character to the red wines of Burgundy, mostly aged in French barriques. Some of the best Austrian Pinots come from Neusiedlersee and Blaufraenkischland (Burgenland), and Thermenregion (Lower Austria).

=== Canada ===
Pinot noir has been grown in Ontario for some time in the Niagara Peninsula and especially the Niagara-on-the-Lake and Short Hills Bench wine regions, as well as in Prince Edward County and on the north shore of Lake Ontario. It has also been grown recently in the Okanagan; here it is grown predominantly on the Naramata bench and in the northern Okanagan, Lower Mainland, and Vancouver Island wine regions of British Columbia. It is also grown in the Annapolis Valley region of Nova Scotia and the Lanaudière and Brome-Missisquoi regions of Quebec.

=== Chile ===
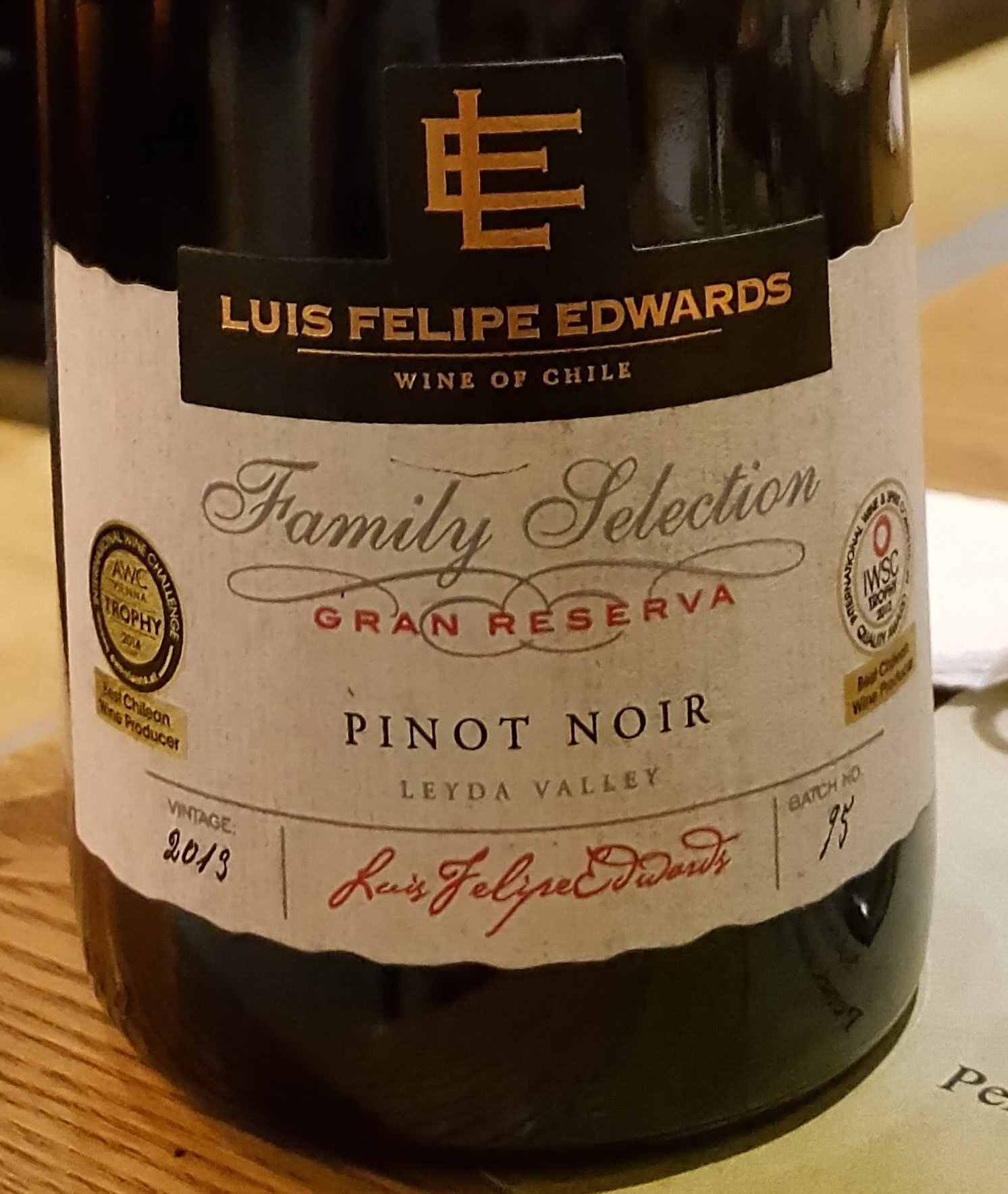
An example from Leyda Valley, Chile

Pinot noir is produced at the Leyda Valley, one of the minor wine districts of the Aconcagua wine region of Chile and in the southern district Biobio.

=== UK ===
Pinot noir is increasingly being planted in the U.K. and is now the second most widely planted variety (305-ha in 2012), almost all of it for sparkling wine.

=== France ===
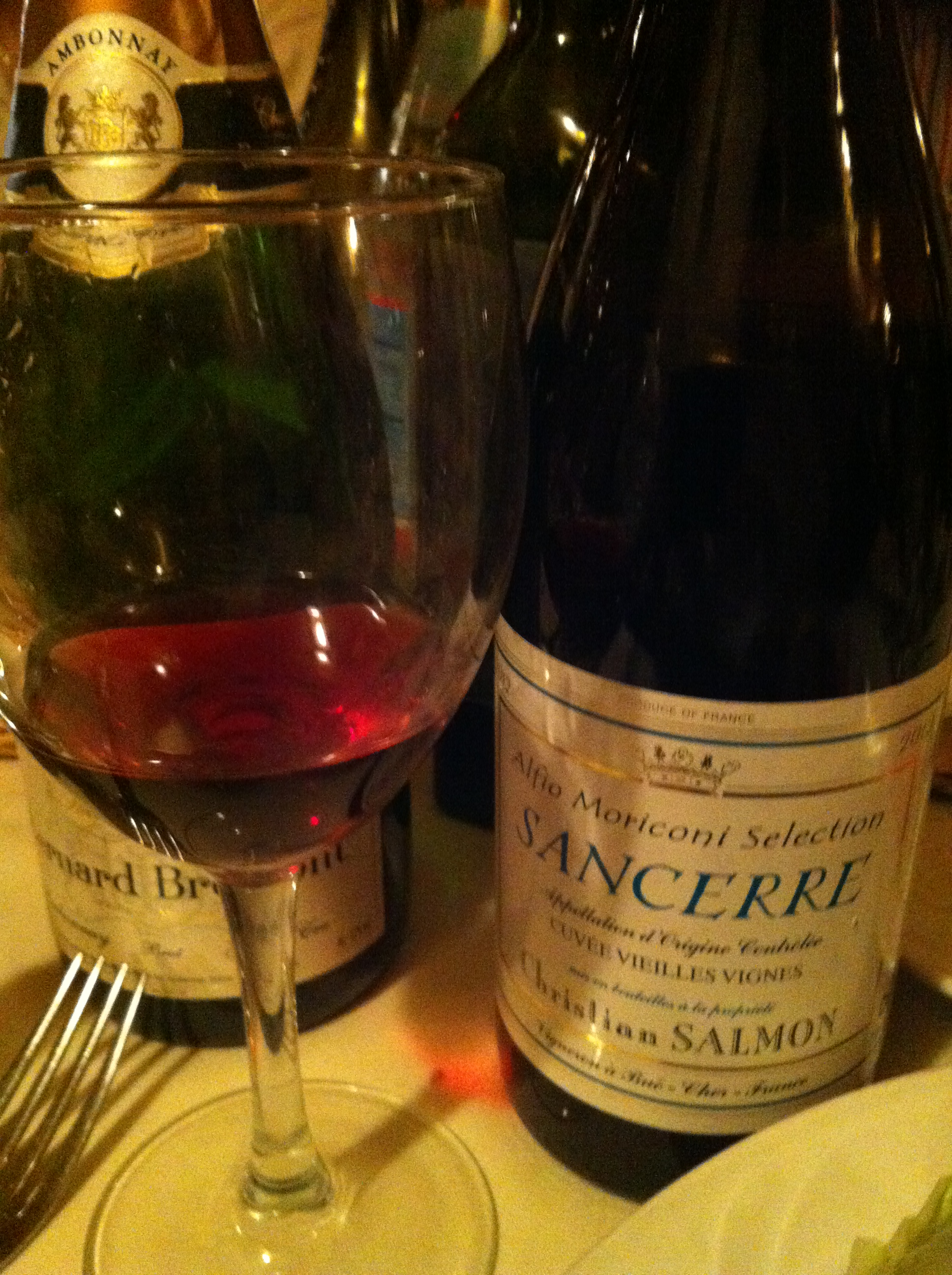
A Sancerre rouge from the Loire Valley made from Pinot noir

Pinot noir has made France's Burgundy appellation famous, and vice versa. Wine historians, including John Winthrop Haeger and Roger Dion, believe that the association between Pinot and Burgundy was the explicit strategy of Burgundy's Valois dukes. Roger Dion, in his thesis regarding Philip the Bold's role in promoting the spread of Pinot noir, holds that the reputation of Beaune wines as "the finest in the world" was a propaganda triumph of Burgundy's Valois dukes. In any event, the worldwide archetype for Pinot noir is that grown in Burgundy, where it has been cultivated since 100 AD. Burgundy is the most northerly good red wine growing district in the World.

Burgundy's Pinot noir produces wines that can age well in good years, developing complex fruit and forest floor flavors as they age, often reaching peak 15 or 20 years after the vintage. Many of the wines are produced in small quantities. Today, the Côte d'Or escarpment of Burgundy has about 4,500 hectares (11,000 acres) of Pinot noir. Most of the region's finest wines are produced from this area. The Côte Chalonnaise and Mâconnais regions in southern Burgundy have another 4,000 hectares (9,900 acres).

In Jura département, across the river valley from Burgundy, the wines made from Pinot noir are lighter.

In Champagne it is used in blending with Chardonnay and Pinot Meunier. It can also appear unblended; in which case it may be labeled Blanc de Noirs. The Champagne appellation has more Pinot planted than any other area of France.

In Sancerre it is used to make red and rosé wines, much lighter in style than those of Burgundy, refreshing served chilled, especially in warmer years when they are less thin.

In Alsace it is generally used to make Pinot-noir d'Alsace, similar in character to red Burgundy and Beaujolais wines but usually consumed chilled. Prominent examples are Rouge de Barr and Rouge d'Ottrott. Pinot noir is the only red wine produced in Alsace.

=== Germany ===
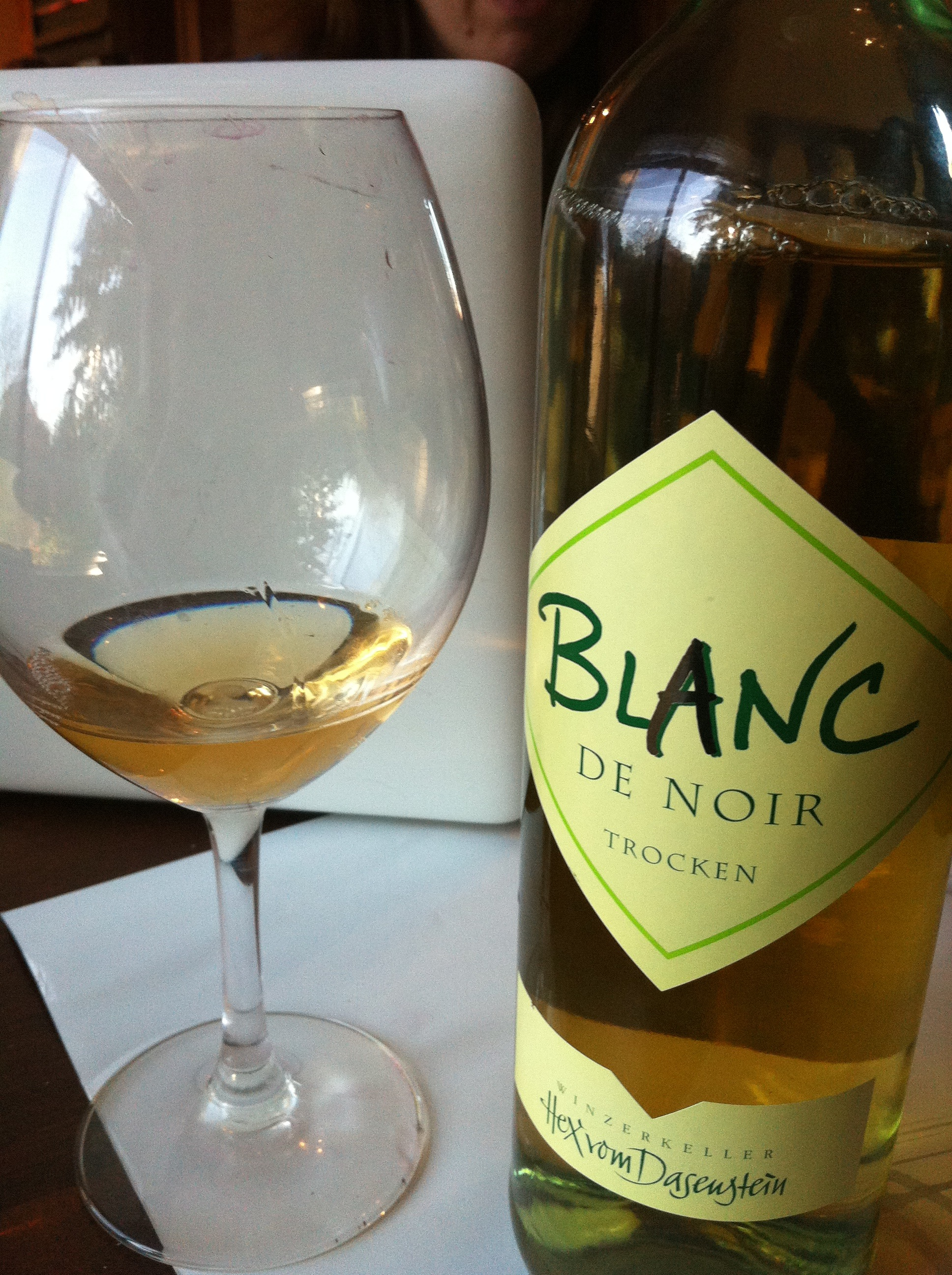
A German Blanc de Noirs from the Baden region made from Pinot noir grapes pressed quickly after harvest to produce a white wine from the red grapes

Among countries planted with Pinot noir, Germany ranks third behind France and the United States. In Germany it is called Spätburgunder (German pronunciation: [ˈʃpɛːtbʊʁˌɡʊndɐ], lit. 'Late Burgundian') and is now the most widely planted red grape. Historically much German wine produced from Pinot noir was pale, often rosé like the red wines of Alsace; over-cropping and bunch-rot were major contributing factors to this. However, recently, despite the northerly climate, darker, richer reds have been produced, often barrel (barrique) aged, in regions such as Baden, Palatinate (Pfalz) and Ahr. These are rarely exported and are often expensive in Germany for the better examples. In the weekend edition of the "Financial Times" of 21/22 April 2018 Jancis Robinson wrote about ... alternatives to red burgundy As "Rhenish", German Pinot noir is mentioned several times in Shakespearean plays as a highly prized wine.

There is also a smaller-berried, early ripening, lower yield variety called Frühburgunder (Pinot Noir Précoce; lit. 'Early Burgundian'), which is grown in Rheinhessen and Ahr area.

=== Italy ===
In Italy, where Pinot noir is known as Pinot nero, it has traditionally been cultivated in South Tyrol, the Collio Goriziano, Franciacorta, Oltrepò Pavese, Veneto, Friuli and Trentino. It is also planted in Tuscany. In South Tyrol the variety is first noted 1838 as "Bourgoigne noir" in a grape wine buy list of the "k.u.k. Landwirtschafts-Gesellschaft von Tirol und Vorarlberg, Niederlassung Bozen" and later called "Blauburgunder" like in Austria. The first analytical descriptions are from Edmund Mach (founder of Ist. Agr. San Michele a.A.) in the year 1894: Friedrich Boscarolli - Rametz/Meran - Rametzer Burgunder 1890, Chorherrenstift Neustift - Blauburgunder 1890, R.v.Bressendorf - Vernaun/Meran - Burgunder 1890, C. Frank - Rebhof Gries Bozen - Burgunder 1889, Fr. Tschurtschenthaler - Bozen - Burgunder 1890 & 1891, Fr. Tschurtschenthaler - Bozen - Kreuzbichler 1889 & 1891 & 1887.

=== Moldova ===
Pinot noir grapes in a vineyard in Moldova

Large amounts of Pinot were planted in central Moldova during the 19th century, but much was lost to the ravages of phylloxera; Soviet control of Moldova from 1940 to 1991 also reduced the productivity of vineyards.

=== New Zealand ===
Pinot noir is New Zealand's most widely planted red wine grape variety and its second most widely planted wine grape overall, after Sauvignon blanc. New Zealand Winegrowers recorded 5,171 hectares (12,780 acres) planted with Pinot noir in 2025, of which 5,053 hectares (12,490 acres) was producing.

The development of modern New Zealand Pinot noir was supported by the introduction of Swiss clones during the 1960s, followed by further imports, principally from Burgundy. Improvements in planting material, vineyard management and winemaking contributed to the variety's growing reputation from the 1980s onward.

Differences in climate, soils and vineyard location contribute to regional variation in New Zealand Pinot noir. Marlborough examples commonly show red-fruit flavours and fresh acidity, while Wairarapa wines, including those from Martinborough, often have darker fruit and savoury characteristics. Central Otago encompasses a range of styles, reflecting differences between its warmer basins and cooler vineyard areas.

The Waitaki Valley wine region in North Otago produces Pinot noir characterised by red-fruit flavours, herbs, spice, fresh acidity and fine tannins, from vineyards on limestone slopes and river gravels. Its distinctive savoury style has been noted in New Zealand Winegrower, while winemaker Jeff Sinnott has described the regional wines as restrained, ethereal and fine-boned. Matt Kramer compared the perfume and layered depth of Clos Ostler's 2010 Caroline's Pinot Noir with Chambolle-Musigny.

=== Slovenia ===
In Slovenia, the Pinot noir is produced especially in the Slovenian Littoral, particularly in the Goriška Brda sub-region. In smaller amounts, the Pinot noir is also produced in Slovenian Styria. The wine is usually called Modri Pinot (Blue Pinot) or also Modri Burgundec (Blue Burgundy).

=== South Africa ===
With the growth of the South African wine industry into newer areas, Pinot noir is now also to be found in cool climate Walker Bay and Elgin, the two oldest Pinot regions in the country.

There are currently just over 1,200 ha of Pinot noir in South Africa, making up 1,5% of the total plantings in the country.

The Top 5 Pinot noir Wine Awards annually recognizes the top South African Pinot noir red wines.

=== Spain ===
In Spain, Pinot noir is grown in many of the wine regions from the north to the south, but the vast majority of Pinot noir is grown in Catalonia, where it is used in still wines and Cava, Spanish sparkling wine. It is an authorised variety in some of the Catalan DOPs. In 2015 there were 1,063 hectares (2,630 acres) of Pinot noir grown in Spain.

=== Switzerland ===
Pinot noir is a popular grape variety all over Switzerland. In German-speaking regions of Switzerland it is often called Blauburgunder. Pinot noir wines are produced in Neuchâtel, Schaffhausen, Zürich, St. Gallen and Bündner Herrschaft (Grisons). In Valais, Pinot noir is also blended with Gamay to produce the well-known Dôle.

=== United States ===
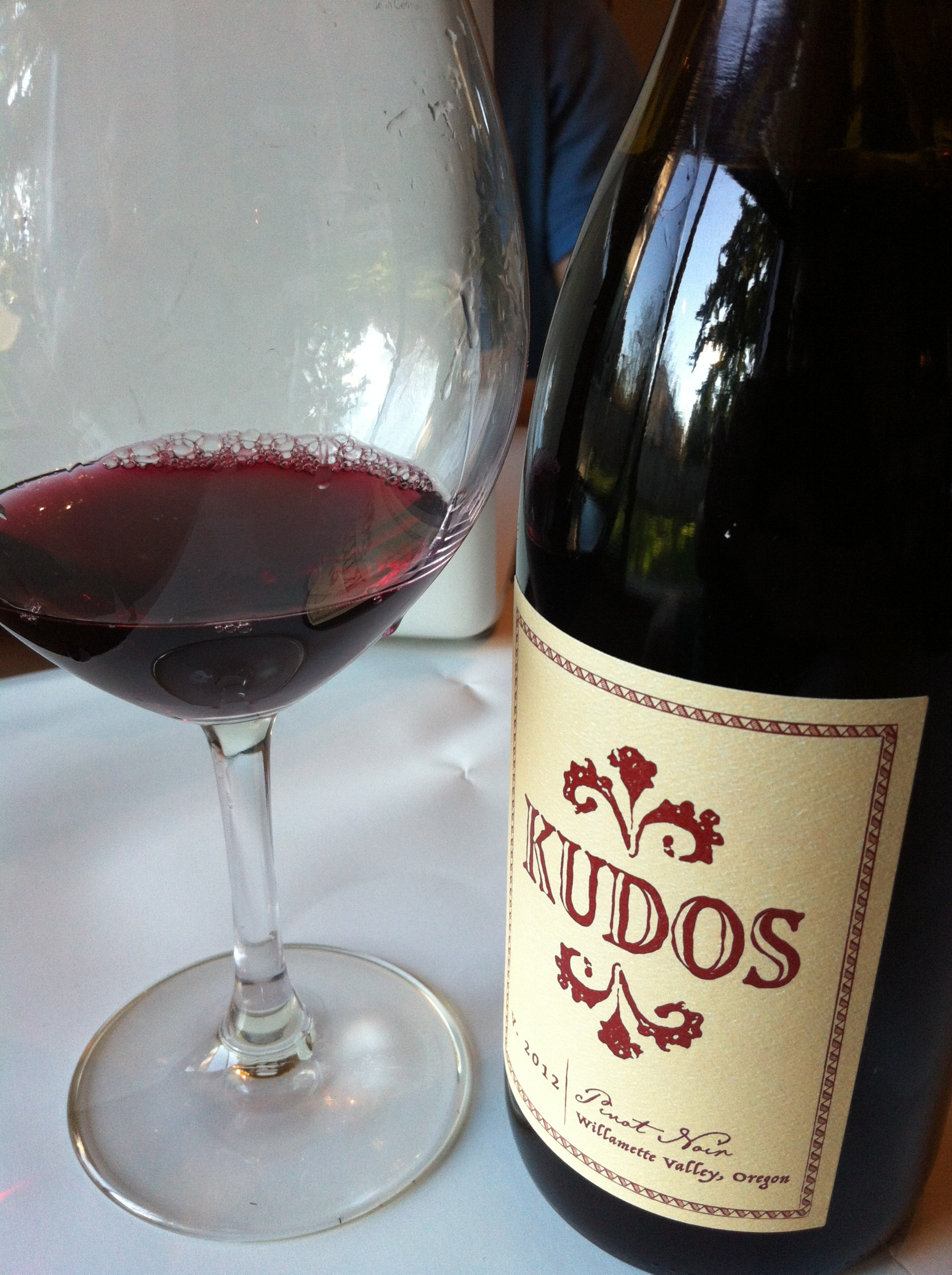
A Pinot noir from the Willamette Valley in Oregon

By volume most Pinot noir in America is grown in California, with Oregon second in production. Other growing regions are the states of Washington, Michigan, and New York.

California wine regions known for producing Pinot noir are:

- Sonoma Coast AVA
- Russian River Valley AVA
- Central Coast AVA
- Sta. Rita Hills
- Monterey County / Santa Lucia Highlands
- Santa Cruz Mountains AVA
- Carneros District of Napa and Sonoma
- Anderson Valley
- Livermore Valley
- San Luis Obispo County / Arroyo Grande Valley, Edna Valley

Oregon wine regions known for producing Pinot noir:

- Willamette Valley AVA
- Dundee Hills AVA
- Laurelwood District AVA
- Eola-Amity Hills AVA
- Yamhill-Carlton District AVA
- McMinnville AVA
- Chehalem Mountains AVA
- Ribbon Ridge AVA
- Rogue Valley AVA
- Umpqua Valley AVA

Washington wine regions known for producing Pinot noir:

- Columbia Valley AVA
- Walla Walla Valley AVA
- Yakima Valley
- Wahluke Slope AVA

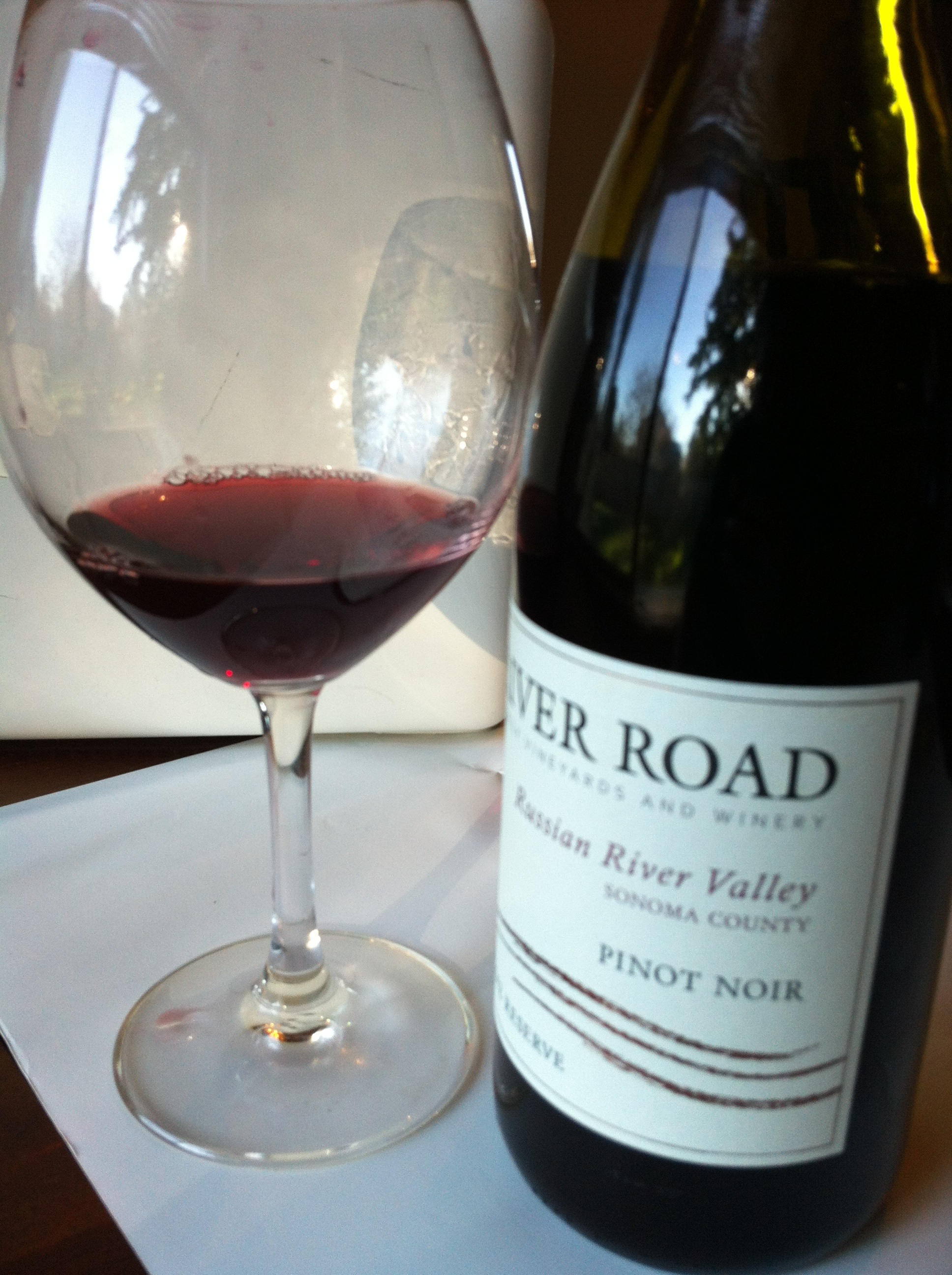
A Pinot noir from the Russian River Valley of California

Richard Sommers of HillCrest Vineyard in the Umpqua Valley of Oregon is the father of Oregon Pinot noir. An early graduate of UC Davis, Sommers moved north after graduation with the idea of planting Pinot noir in the Coastal valleys of Oregon. He brought cuttings to the state in 1959 and made his first commercial planting at HillCrest Vineyard in Roseburg Oregon in 1961. For this, he was honored by the Oregon State House of Representatives (HR 4A). In 2011 the State of Oregon honored him for this achievement and also for producing the first commercial bottling in the state in 1967. It was announced by the state of Oregon in the summer of 2012 that a historical marker would be placed at the winery in the summer of 2013.

Sommers, who graduated from UC Davis in the early 1950s, brought Pinot noir cuttings to Oregon's Umpqua Valley in 1959 and planted them at HillCrest Vineyard in 1961. These first Pinot noir cuttings came from Louis Martinis Sr.'s Stanley Ranch located in the Carneros region of Napa Valley. The first commercial vintage from these grapes was the noted 1967 Pinot noir although test bottlings were made as early as 1963. In the 1970s several other growers followed suit. In 1979, David Lett took his wines to a competition in Paris, known in English as the Wine Olympics, and they placed third among Pinots. In a 1980 rematch arranged by French wine magnate Robert Drouhin, the Eyrie vintage improved to second place. The competition established Oregon as a world-class Pinot noir-producing region.

The Willamette Valley of Oregon is at the same latitude as the Burgundy region of France and has a similar climate in which the finicky Pinot noir grapes thrive. In 1987, Drouhin purchased land in the Willamette Valley, and in 1989 built Domaine Drouhin Oregon, a state-of-the-art, gravity-fed winery. Throughout the 1980s, the Oregon wine industry blossomed.

== Blends ==
While Pinot noir is commonly blended in sparkling Champagne (with Chardonnay and Pinot Meunier), in still wines it is best-known as unblended, varietal wines; this is similar to Chardonnay, the other great variety of Burgundy. Some traditional blends of Pinot noir include:

- Jura wine, particularly the Arbois AOC and Côtes du Jura, where it is blended with Trousseau and Poulsard.
- Bourgogne Passe-Tout-Grains AOC, where it is blended with Gamay, and can also be blended with Chardonnay, Pinot blanc, and Pinot gris. Pinot noir is also blended with Gamay in Switzerland.
- Loire Valley (wine), where it is often found in blends, including with Gamay and Cabernet Franc, notably in the Touraine AOC.

Pinot noir may also be blended with other grapes in inexpensive varietal wines, where the Pinot noir percentage is high enough for a varietal labeling but is not 100% (75% in the United States, 85% in the European Union). Commonly a heavier grape like Syrah is used to add color and body, resulting in a wine rather unlike pure Pinot noir wines. This was traditionally done in Burgundy until the 1920s and is today found in California wine. Similarly, it is sometimes blended with Malbec.

== Recent popularity ==
Being lighter in style, Pinot noir has benefited from a trend toward more restrained, less alcoholic wines around 12% alcohol by volume.

During 2004 and the beginning of 2005, Pinot noir became considerably more popular among consumers in the US, Australia, New Zealand and Asia as a result of the film Sideways, and its deleterious effect on Merlot sales. Throughout the film, the main character speaks fondly of Pinot noir while denigrating Merlot. Following the film's U.S. release in October 2004, Merlot sales dropped 2% while Pinot noir sales increased 16% in the Western United States. While the film mainly celebrated California's Santa Barbara County, it also highlighted Oregon's Pinot Noirs. A similar trend occurred in British wine outlets. A 2009 study by Sonoma State University found that Sideways slowed the growth in Merlot sales volume and caused its price to fall, but the film's main effect on the wine industry was a rise in the sales volume and price of Pinot noir and in overall wine consumption. A 2014 study by Vineyard Financial Associates estimated that Sideways cost American Merlot farmers over US$400m in lost revenue in the decade after its release.

== Synonyms ==
Blauburgunder, Blauer Arbst, Blauer Spätburgunder, Burgunder, Cortaillod, Mário Feld, Mário Feld Tinto, Morillon, Morillon noir, Mourillon, Savagnin noir or Salvagnin noir.

== See also ==
- International variety

== Bibliography ==
- Haeger, John Winthrop (September 14, 2004). North American Pinot Noir. University of California Press. ISBN 978-0-520-24114-5. Archived from the original on May 16, 2008.
- Robinson, Jancis (2006). The Oxford Companion to Wine, Third Edition. Oxford University Press. ISBN 978-0-19-860990-2.
