= Pinot Noir Précoce =

Variety of grape

- Grape (Vitis)
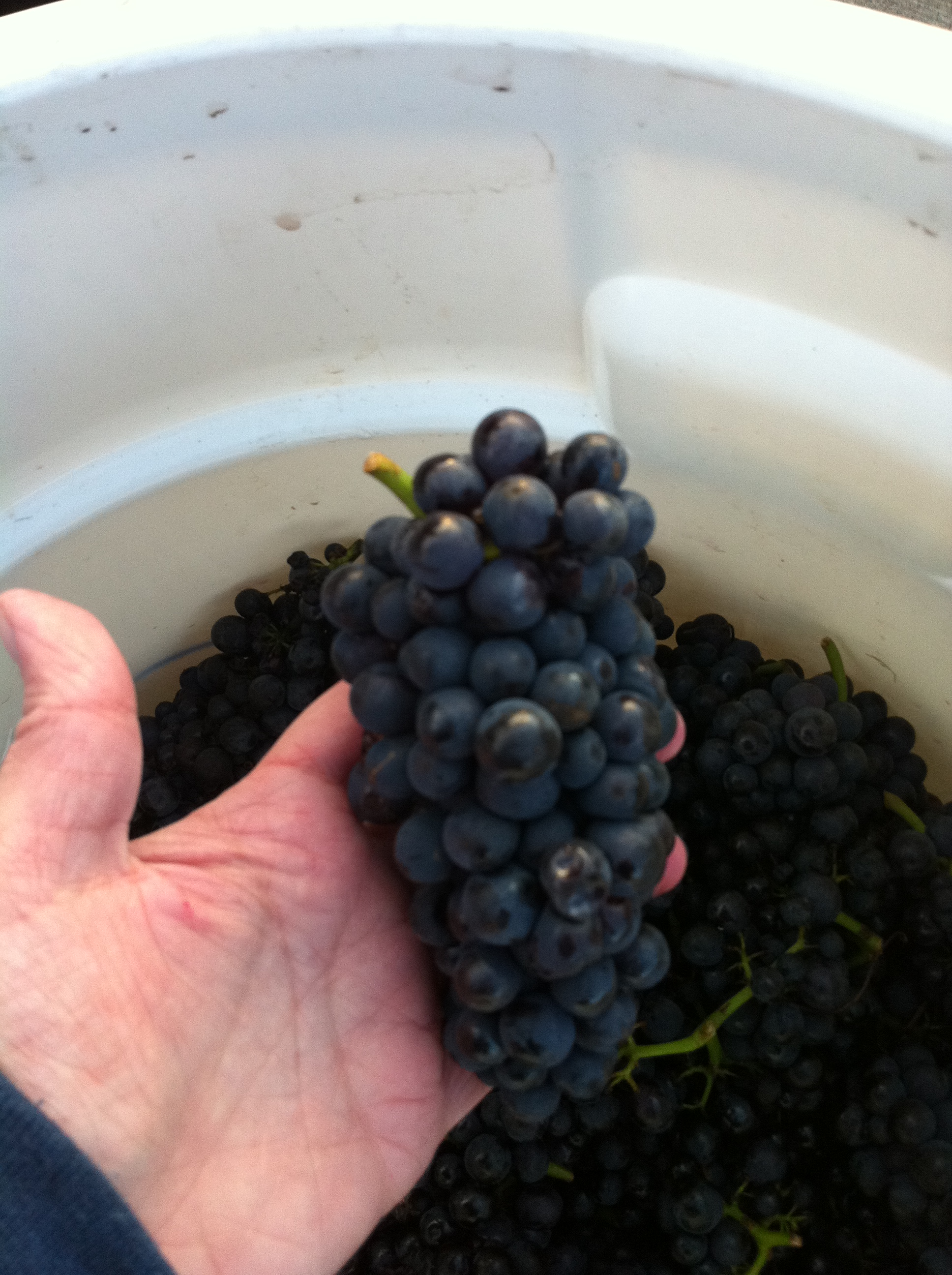
- Pinot Precoce grown at Cloud Mountain Vineyard in the Puget Sound AVA of Western Washington
- Species: Vitis vinifera
- Also called: Frühburgunder, other synonyms
- Origin: France
- Notable regions: Germany
- VIVC number: 9280

Pinot Noir Précoce (English: /ˌpiːnoʊ ˈnwɑːr prɛˈkɒs/, French: [pino nwaʁ pʁekɔs]) or, as it is called in parts of Germany, Frühburgunder (German: [ˈfʁyːbʊʁˌɡʊndɐ]) is a dark, blue-black–skinned, variety of grape used for wine and is a form or mutation of Pinot noir, which differs essentially by ripening earlier than normal (thus the use of the descriptive nomination 'précoce'). Whilst sometimes treated as a separate grape variety by ampelographers, there are nevertheless those who consider it is simply an early ripening form of Pinot Noir, and in some cases, Pinot Noir Précoce wines may therefore be found straightforwardly labelled "Pinot noir".

As it seems highly likely that Pinot Noir Précoce is simply a natural early ripening mutation of Pinot noir, it is extremely likely to have occurred and been selected and specially cultivated in many different Pinot growing regions (e.g., Burgundy, Champagne, Alsace, Loire, and throughout many older German vineyards) on many separate occasions throughout the long history of Pinot noir cultivation in Europe.

Wines from Pinot Noir Précoce are closely similar to, if not indistinguishable from, those of Pinot noir, and it is far from clear that anything distinguishes its wines other than oenological characters resulting from its early ripening (e.g., relatively fuller flavor development, lower acidity, and the like).

== Geographical distribution ==
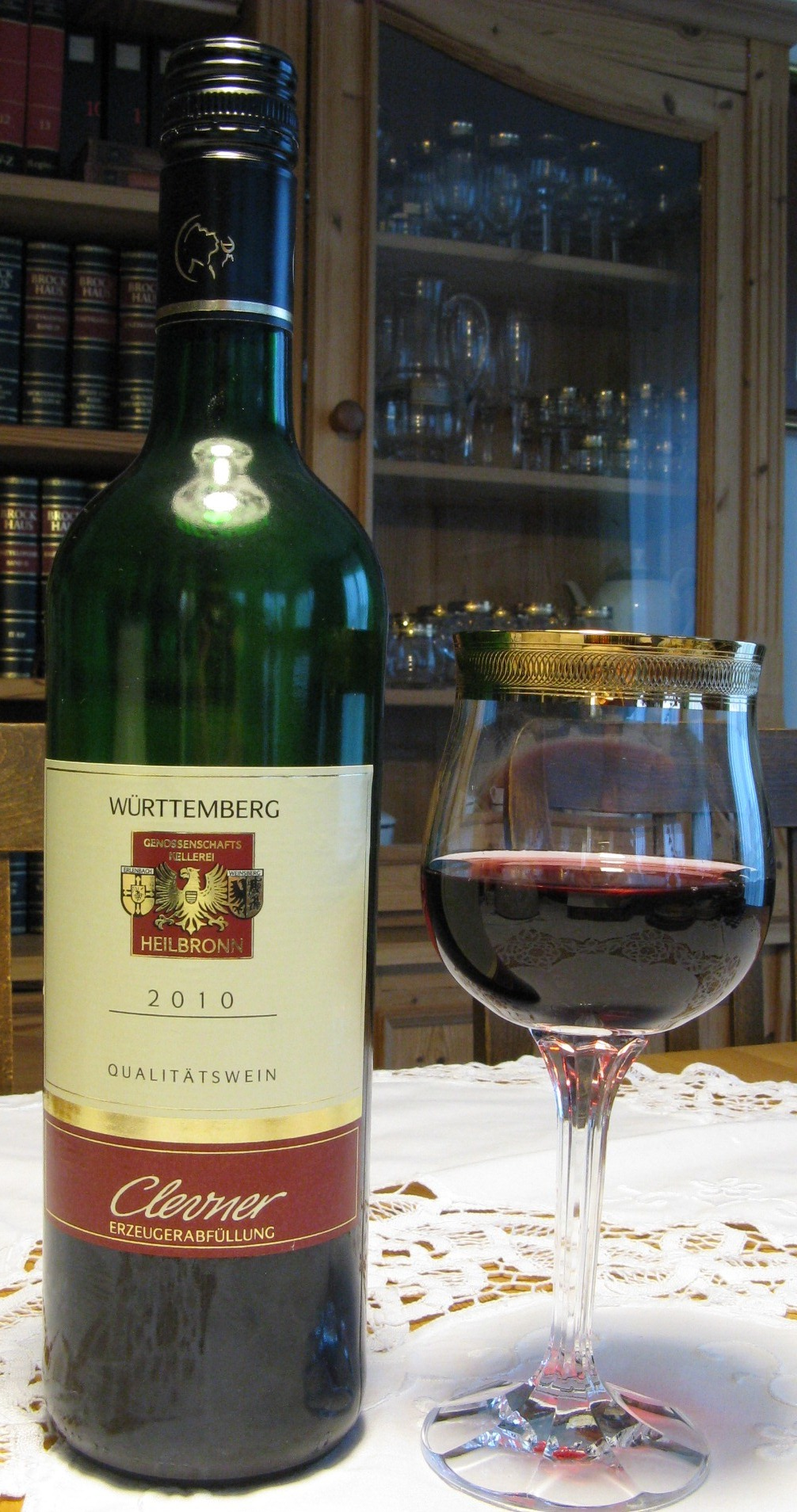
German Clevner wine from Württemberg made from Pinot Noir Précoce.

The early ripening of Pinot Noir Précoce means that it is primarily popular in colder wine regions, and most of the current plantations are found in Germany. Up until the early 20th century, it was one of the most grown varieties in the Ahr region, but then declined to only 15 hectares (37 acres) in the 1960s, and was on the verge of becoming extinct due to problems of vine diseases. In the 1970s, the Geisenheim Grape Breeding Institute took an interest in it, and began selecting virus-free clones suitable for propagation. The variety has thereafter had a modest revival in Germany, and in 2008 plantations stood at 252 hectares (620 acres). It also attracts a growing level of interest in areas traditionally considered as marginal regions, even in cool climate viticulture, plantings can now be seen in vineyards between 54°N in North Yorkshire, England to 58.5°N on Muhu island, Estonia.

== Synonyms ==
Pinot Noir Précoce is also known under the following synonyms: Augsttraube, Augustiner blau, Augustklevner, Augusttraube, Black Inly, Blaue Jakobstraube, Blauer Frühburgunder, Burgundac Crni Rani, Burgunder Früh Blau, Burgunder Früher Blauer, Champagner Schwarz, Clävner Früh, Clevner Frühburgunder, Frauentagtraube, Frühburgunder, Frühburgunder Blau, Frühe Jakobstraube, Früher Blauer Klevner, Frühreifer Schwarzer Burgunder, Frühtraube, Gospinsza, Ischia, Iskiya, Jackobstraube, Jacobi, Jacobitraube, Jacobstraube, Jacobszoeloe, Jakubske, Jakubske Skore, Juliusi Szoeloe, July Grape, Korai Kek Kisburgundi, Laurenzitraube, Laurenziustraube, Loerinc Szoeloe, Lujega, Luviana Veronese, Maddalena nera, Madeleine noire, Magdalenentraube, Magdolna Szoeloe, Möhrchen, Morillon Hatif, Morillon Noir Hatif, Morillon Parisien, Noir Précoce de Gênes, Noir Précoce de Hongrie, Noir Printannier, Petit Noir Précoce, Petit Noirin, Pineau De Juillet, Pineau Madeleine, Pino Cornij Ranij, Pino Rannii, Pinot Hatif de Rilly, Pinot Madeleine, Pinot Nero Précoce, Pinot Noir Précose, Pinot Plant de Juillet, Pinot Pommier, Pinot Précoce Noir, Pinot Rannii, Pinot Timpuriu, Plant Printanier, Précoce noir, Raisin de Juillet, Raisin de la Madelaine, Raisin de St. Jean, Raisin Précoce, Rani Modri Burgrendac, Saint Jacques, Szent Anna Szoeloe, Tidlig Bla Burgunder, Trauentagtraube, Tuannes Negres, Uva De Trivolte, Uva Di Tre Volte, Vigne D'ischia and Zherna Mushza.

== Offspring ==
The variety Madeleine Royale is a seed plant of Pinot Noir Précoce.
