= List of viticulturists =

Viticulture is the science, production, and study of the cultivation of grapes. This is a list of notable viticulturists:

== A ==
- John Adlum, American viticulturist who was the first to cultivate the Catawba grape
- Mary Anderson, American female real estate developer, rancher, and viticulturist
- Fabio Asquini, Italian economist and winemaker

== B ==
- Bo Barrett, American male winemaker of Chateau Montelena and son of Jim Barrett
- Heidi Barrett, American winemaker and entrepreneur known for California's cult wines, also wife of Bo Barrett
- Jim Barrett (winemaker), American winemaker and former owner of Chateau Montelena
- Helmut Becker, German viticulturist and former chief of the Geisenheim Grape Breeding Institute
- Andy Beckstoffer, California vineyard owner
- Eleanor Berwick, English wine grower in Suffolk
- Heinrich Birk, German viticulturist and former chief of the Geisenheim Grape Breeding Institute
- Jean-Charles Boisset, French winemaker and the proprietor of the Boisset Collection
- Henri Bouschet, French viticulturist
- Romeo Bragato, wine personality who played a significant role in the development of the wine industry in Australia and New Zealand
- Gustavo Brambila, Mexican-American winemaker in the Napa Valley
- Isidor Bush, Jewish publisher and viticulturist.

== C ==
- Joseph Bernard Chambers, New Zealand sheep farmer, viticulturist and winemaker
- Adhémar de Chaunac, French-born Canadian wine pioneer
- Francis Ford Coppola, American film director, producer, screenwriter, and winemaker
- Assid Abraham Corban, New Zealand peddler, importer, viticulturist, and wine-maker
- Cathy Corison, American winemaker, entrepreneur, and consultant
- Phil Coturri, American viticulturist and vineyard manager
- Auguste Courtiller, French paleontologist and viticulturist

== D ==
- John Bernard Philip Humbert, 9th Count de Salis-Soglio, British soldier, lawyer, and winemaker

== F ==
- Peter Fanucchi, Californian winegrower
- Ernest Ferroul, French physician, politician, and a leader of the 1907 revolt of the Languedoc winegrowers
- Maurice Fontaine, French politician and viticulturist
- Konstantin Frank, a viticulturist and winemaker in New York
- Barbara Funkhouser, American journalist, newspaper editor, writer and vineyard operator
- Elizabeth Furse, American politician and small business owner

== G ==
- Dave Godfrey
- Sir David Graaff, 3rd Baronet
- Wharton J. Green
- Mike Grgich

== H ==
- Victor Davis Hanson
- Agoston Haraszthy
- August Herold
- Theodore Erasmus Hilgard
- Terry Hoage

== J ==
- Mathieson Jacoby
- Hermann Jaeger
- Sally Johnson, American female winemaker
- Kathy Joseph
- Hans Otto Jung

== K ==
- James King (pioneer)
- Mia Klein
- Géza Krepuska

== L ==
- Leo Laliman
- Anna Larroucau Laborde de Lucero
- Pauline Lhote
- Nicholas Longworth (winemaker)
- Louis Lucas
- Giorgio Lungarotti

== M ==
- William Macarthur
- Marcelin Albert
- Henri Marès
- Paul Masson
- Fritz Maytag
- Philippe Melka
- Carole Meredith
- Marshall Dawson Miller
- Constantin Mimi
- Robert Mondavi
- Jacques Augustin Mourgue
- Hermann Müller (Thurgau)
- Thomas Volney Munson

== N ==
- Henry Morris Naglee

== O ==
- Nello Olivo

== P ==
- Mary Penfold
- Abraham Izak Perold
- Ben Pon
- Dorota Pospíšilová

== R ==
- Benoît Raclet
- Rashbam
- Pierre Richard
- Charles Rosen (scientist)
- Alphonse James de Rothschild
- Ariane de Rothschild
- Benjamin de Rothschild
- David René de Rothschild
- Édouard Alphonse James de Rothschild
- Édouard de Rothschild
- James Mayer de Rothschild
- Nathaniel de Rothschild
- Philippe de Rothschild

== S ==
- Charles Saalmann
- Pierre Sainsevain
- Guy Salisbury-Jones
- Otto Schneider-Orelli
- Albert Seibel
- Richard Smart (viticulturalist)
- John Summerskill
- Elmer Swenson

== T ==
- Pierre Taittinger
- William Thompson (viticulturist)
- Helen Turley, American winemaker

== V ==
- Elizabeth Vianna
- Jean-Louis Vignes

== W ==
- Gil Wahlquist, Australian pioneer organic winemaker
- John Carl Warnecke
- Martin Weinek
- Warren Winiarski
- Friedrich Wohnsiedler
- John Reid Wolfskill
- William Wolfskill

== Z ==
- Phyllis Zouzounis, American female winemaker known for Zinfandel wine
- Fritz Zweigelt, Austrian botanist, entomologist and grapevine breeder
