= Jako =

German sportswear company

Jako AG
- Type: AG
- Founded: November 1, 1989; 36 years ago
- Founder: Rudi Sprügel
- Headquarters: Hollenbach district, Mulfingen (Hohenlohe), Baden-Württemberg, Germany
- Key people: Rudi Sprügel, Chairman
- Products: Teamsports Apparel
- Revenue: €95 Million (2017)
- Number of employees: 395
- Website: www.jako.com

Jako AG is a German sportswear company based in the Hollenbach district of Mulfingen, Baden-Württemberg. The company was founded by Rudi Sprügel in 1989 in Stachenhausen. Jako provides kits for teams playing association football, handball, basketball, ice hockey and other sports.

Jako has provided teams with equipment since 1989. They began equipping sports teams located geographically between the Jagst and Kocher rivers. Jako is represented in more than 40 countries.

== Product lines ==
- Teamline
- Football
- Running
- Handball
- Volleyball
- Basketball
- Fistball
- Basics
- Women
- Hardware

== Current sponsorships ==
Jako is the official kit provider for the following sports teams.

=== Football ===
==== Asia ====
- Iraq
- Syria
- Turkmenistan

==== Europe ====
- Moldova
- Luxembourg (from 2026)

==== Africa ====
- (Ethiopia) Fasil Kenema
- (Morocco) Difaâ El Jadidi
- (Rwanda) Rayon Sports
- (Egypt) Al Ahly Volleyball
- (Egypt) Al Ahly Handball
- (Egypt) Al Ahly Basketball

==== Asia ====
- (Australia) Arncliffe Scots FC
- (Bahrain) Al Najma Club
- (Bahrain) Al Riffa
- (Iraq) Al-Minaa SC
- (Iraq) Al-Kahrabaa SC
- (Iraq) Al-Karkh SC
- (Iraq) Al-Hussein SC
- (Iraq) Naft Maysan SC
- Al-Jazeera Club (Jordan)
- (Lebanon) AC Tripoli
- (Lebanon) Shabab Baalbeck SC
- (Lebanon) Shabab Al-Sahel
- (Lebanon) Tadamon Sour
- (Malaysia) Thai Selangor
- (Oman) Dhofar
- (Qatar) Al Ahli SC (Doha)
- (Qatar) Muaither SC
- (Qatar) Umm Salal SC
- (Turkmenistan) FC Aşgabat
- (Turkmenistan) Merw
- (Uzbekistan) Kokand 1912
- (Uzbekistan) FC Shurtan Guzar

==== Europe ====
- (Armenia) Urartu
- (Austria) SC Rheindorf Altach
- (Azerbaijan) Sumgayit
- (Belgium) Antwerp
- (Belgium) OH Leuven
- (Belarus) FC Shakhtyor Soligorsk
- (Bulgaria) Belasitsa Petrich
- (Bulgaria) CSKA 1948 Sofia
- (Bulgaria) Ludogorets Razgrad
- (Bulgaria) Marek Dupnitsa
- (Bulgaria) Montana
- (Croatia) NK Slaven Belupo
- (Cyprus) Pafos FC
- (Czech Republic) FC Hradec Králové
- (Czech Republic) MFK Chrudim
- (Georgia (country)) FC Dinamo Tbilisi
- (Germany) Bahlinger SC
- (Germany) Berliner AK 07
- (Germany) Chemnitzer FC
- (Germany) Berliner FC Dynamo
- (Germany) Dynamo Dresden
- (Germany) VfB Eichstätt
- (Germany) VfB Germania Halberstadt
- (Germany) FC Gießen
- (Germany) TuS Haltern
- (Germany) VfB Homberg
- (Germany) Mainz 05
- (Germany) Mainz 05 II
- (Germany) SC Preußen Münster
- (Germany) TSV Rain am Lech
- (Germany) SV Rödinghausen
- (Germany) Rot-Weiss Essen
- (Germany) VfB Stuttgart
- (Germany) 1. FFC Turbine Potsdam
- (Germany) FSV Union Fürstenwalde
- (Germany) FC Würzburger Kickers
- (Hungary) Paksi FC
- (Hungary) Nyíregyháza Spartacus FC
- (Hungary) Gyirmót FC Győr
- (Hungary) MTE 1904
- (Iceland) Breiðablik Kópavogur
- (Iceland) ÍR Reykjavík
- (Iceland) UMF Selfoss
- (Iceland) Ungmennafélagið Afturelding
- (Iceland) ÍF Völsungur
- (Iceland) Knattspyrnufélag Fjarðabyggðar
- (Iceland) Vestri
- (Iceland) UMF Tindastóll
- (Iceland) ÍF Huginn
- (Iceland) IF Höttur
- (Iceland) Fylkir Reykjavík
- (Iceland) UMF Víkingur Ólafsvík
- (Italy) Arzignano Valchiampo
- (Italy) Desenzano
- (Italy) Vidardese
- (Kosovo) SC Gjilani
- (Lithuania) FK Ekranas
- (Lithuania) FK Neptūnas
- (Latvia) Riga FC
- (North Macedonia) Renova
- (Poland) Odra Opole
- (Poland) Błękitni Stargard
- (Poland) AZS Biała Podlaska
- (Portugal) CF Os Bucelenses
- (Romania) FC Metaloglobus București
- (Romania) SCM Zalău
- (Russia) FC Rubin Kazan
- (Russia) FC Shinnik Yaroslavl
- (Russia) FC Anji Makhachkala
- (Russia) FC Tyumen / MFK Tyumen
- (Russia) FC Baltika Kaliningrad
- (Russia) FC Sibir Novosibirsk
- (Russia) FC Nizhny Novgorod
- (Russia) FC Tekstilshchik Ivanovo
- (Slovenia) ND Marjeta na Dravskem polju
- (Serbia) FK Radnički 1923
- (Serbia) FK Radnik Surdulica
- (Serbia) FK Metalac Gornji Milanovac
- (Slovakia) FC Nitra
- (Slovakia) FC VSS Košice
- (Slovakia) MŠK Púchov
- (Turkey) Akhisarspor
- (Turkey) İstanbulspor
- (Ukraine) Chernihiv
- (Ukraine) Lviv
- (Ukraine) Nyva Ternopil
- (Ukraine) Obolon Kyiv
- (Ukraine) Vovchansk
- (Ukraine) Yednist Kyiv

=== Associations ===
Jako is also the official ball supplier for the following leagues and associations:

- (Lebanon) Lebanese Premier League

==== Referees ====
Jako is also the official referee kits supplier for the leagues:

- Oman Professional League (Referees)

=== Track and field ===
==== National teams ====
- Kuwait

=== E-sport teams ===
- (Sweden) S:t Hyby
- (Iceland) Þór Þorlákshöfn

=== Wrestling ===
==== National teams ====
- Ukraine
