= Friedrich Wohnsiedler =

- Born: November 23, 1879; Eberbach-am-Jagst, Germany
- Died: February 10, 1958 (aged 78)
- Occupations: Butcher, orchardist, viticulturist, wine-maker
- Known for: Viticulture in the Hawke's Bay Region

Friedrich Wohnsiedler (23 November 1879 – 10 February 1958) was a New Zealand butcher, orchardist, viticulturist and wine-maker. He was born in Eberbach-am-Jagst, Germany in 1879. He arrived in New Zealand around 1900 and worked as a butcher, first in Lower Hutt, then Woodville, eventually settling in Gisborne. He fled from Gisborne in 1914 due to anti-German feelings, and later settled in Waihirere in the Hawke's Bay Region, where he started with viticulture.
