= Fanucchi =

Fanucchi is an Italian surname. Notable people with the surname include:

- Jacopo Fanucchi (born 1981), Italian footballer
- Ledio Fanucchi (1931–2014), American football player
- Nicola Fanucchi (born 1964), Italian actor and director
- Peter Fanucchi, American winemaker
