= Great French Wine Blight =

Mid-19th century blight by Phylloxera

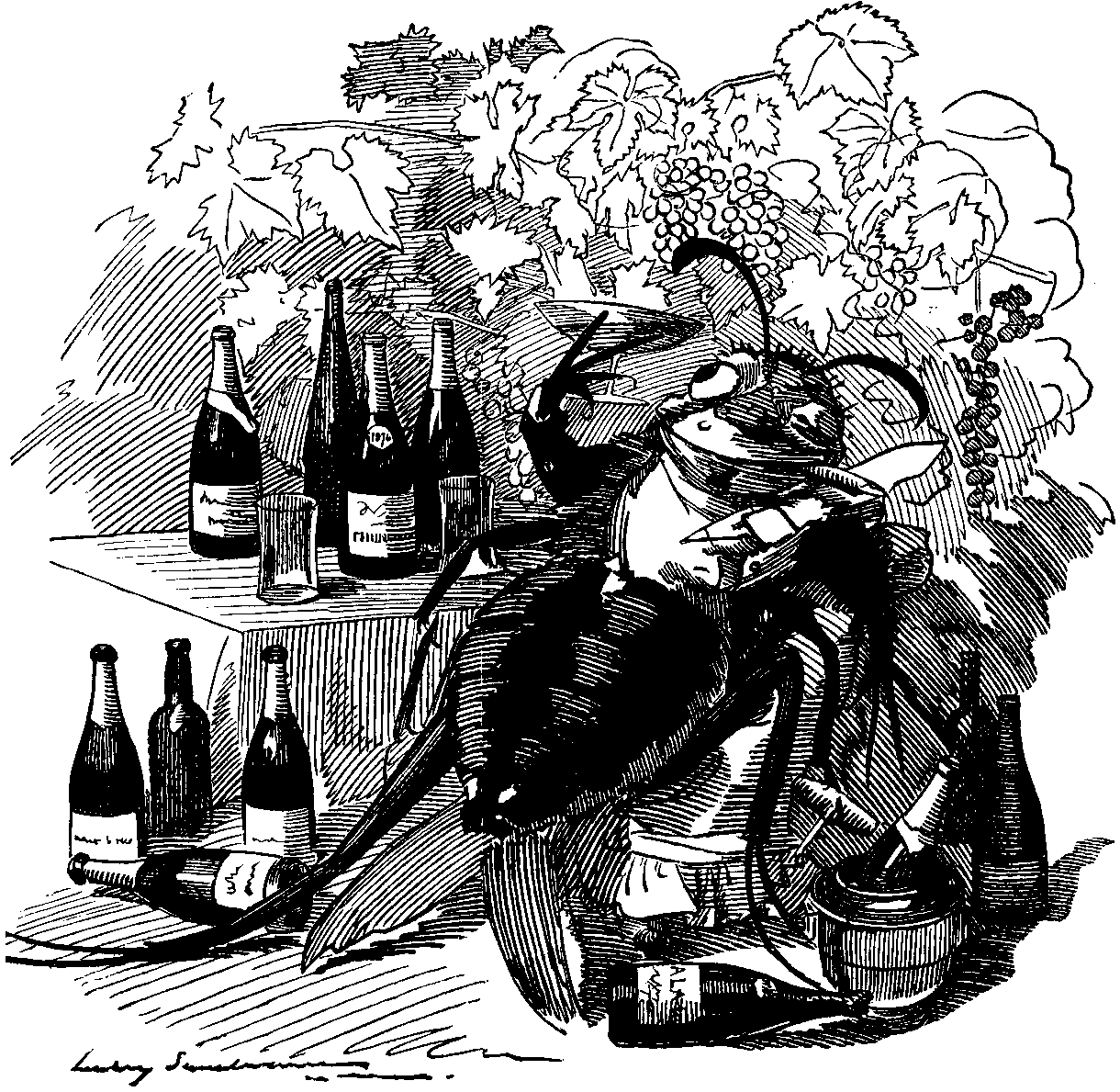
A cartoon from Punch from 1890: The phylloxera, a true gourmet, finds out the best vineyards and attaches itself to the best wines.

The Great French Wine Blight was a severe blight of the mid-19th century that destroyed many of the vineyards in France and laid waste to the wine industry. It was caused by an insect that originated in North America and was carried across the Atlantic in the late 1850s. The actual genus of the insect is still debated, although it is largely considered to have been a species of Daktulosphaira vitifoliae, commonly known as grape phylloxera. While France is considered to have been worst affected, the blight also did a great deal of damage to vineyards in other European countries.

How Phylloxera was introduced to Europe remains debated: American vines had been taken to Europe many times before, for reasons including experimentation and trials in grafting, without consideration of the possibility of the introduction of pestilence. While the Phylloxera was thought to have arrived around 1858, it was first recorded in France in 1863, in the former province of Languedoc. It is argued by some that the introduction of such pests as phylloxera was only a problem after the invention of steamships, which allowed a faster journey across the ocean, and consequently allowed pests such as the Phylloxera to survive the trip.

Eventually, following Jules-Émile Planchon's discovery of the Phylloxera as the cause of the blight, and Charles Valentine Riley's confirmation of Planchon's theory, Leo Laliman and Gaston Bazille, two French wine growers, proposed that the European vines be grafted to the resistant American rootstock that were not susceptible to the Phylloxera. While many of the French wine growers disliked this idea, most found themselves with no other option. The method proved to be an effective remedy. The "Reconstitution" (as it was termed) of the many vineyards that had been lost was a slow process, but eventually the wine industry in France was able to return to relative normality.

== Background ==
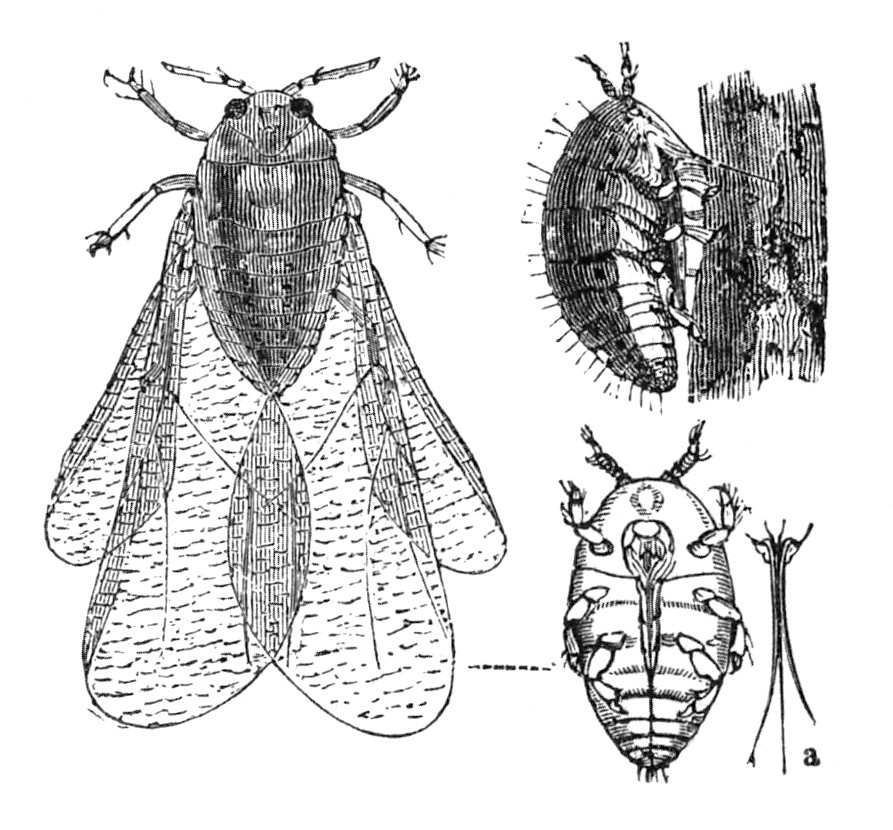
The grape phylloxera responsible for the failure of the French colonist's plantations in Florida, and probably the later destroyer of the French wine industry.

The aphid that was the central source of the damage in France was first noted following the growing of the European vine Vitis vinifera by French colonists in Florida, in the 16th century. These plantations were a failure, and later experiments with related species of vine also failed, although the reason for these failures appears to have been a mystery to the French colonists. It is known today that it was a species of North American grape phylloxera that caused these early vineyards to fail; the venom injected by the Phylloxera causes a disease that is quickly fatal to the European varieties of vine. The aphids initially went unnoticed by the colonists, despite their great numbers, and the pressure to successfully start a vineyard in America at the time.

It became common knowledge among the settlers that their European vines, of the vinifera variety, simply would not grow in American soil, and they resorted to growing native American plants, and established plantations of these native vines. Exceptions did exist; vinifera plantations were well-established in California before the aphids found their way there.

=== Phylloxera ===
There have been several theories proposed for why the phylloxera was ignored as the possible cause of the disease that resulted in the failure of so many vineyards, most of which involve the feeding behaviour of the insect, and the way it attacks the roots. The proboscis of the grape phylloxera has both a venom canal from which it injects its deadly venom and a feeding tube through which it takes in vine sap and nutrients. As the toxin from the venom corrodes the root structure of a vine, the sap pressure falls and, as a result, the Phylloxera quickly withdraws its feeding tube and searches for another source of food. Thus, anyone digging up a diseased and dying vine will not find Phylloxera clinging to the roots of the plant.

=== Journey to Europe ===
For a few centuries, Europeans had experimented with American vines and plants in their soil. Many varieties were imported from America without regulation, disregarding the possibility of pest transfer and related problems. Jules-Emile Planchon, a French biologist who identified the Phylloxera in the 1860s, maintained that the transfer of American vines and plants into Europe greatly increased between roughly 1858 and 1862, and accidentally introduced Phylloxera to Europe around 1860. Others say that the aphid did not enter France until around 1863. The advent of steamships may have been a factor: as they were faster than sailing ships, the Phylloxera were better able to survive the shorter ocean voyage.

== The blight ==
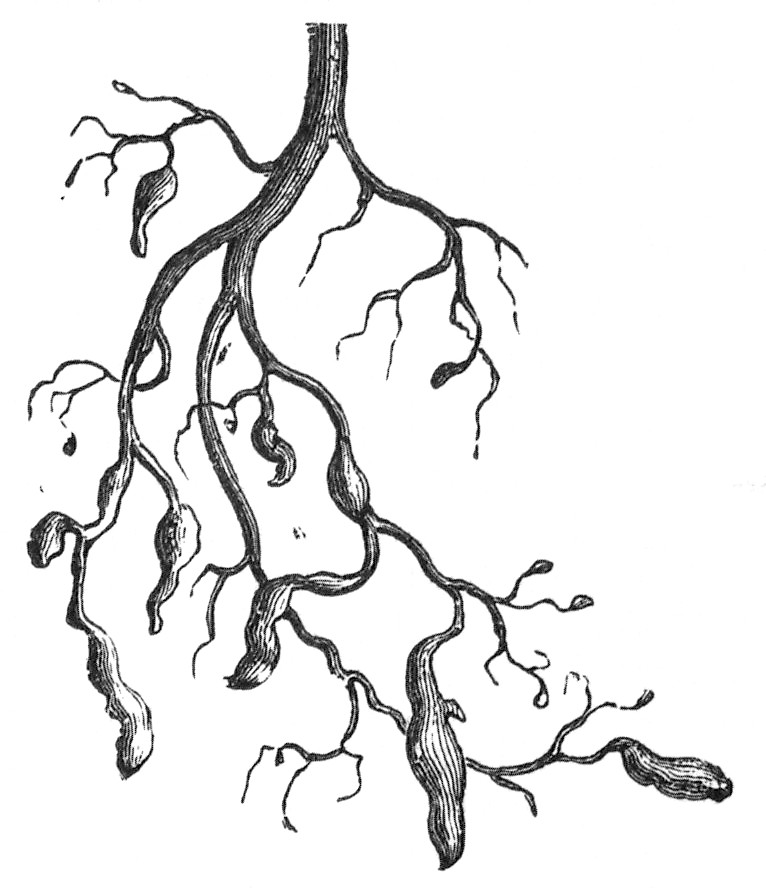
Diagram of the roots of a Vitis vinifera damaged by the aphid.

=== Initial appearance ===
The first known documented instance of an attack by the Phylloxera in France was in the village of Pujaut in the department of Gard of the former province of Languedoc, in 1863. The wine makers there did not notice the aphids, just as the French colonists in America had not, but they noted the mysterious blight that was damaging their vines. The only description of the disease that was given by these wine growers was that it "reminded them distressingly of 'consumption'"(tuberculosis). The blight quickly spread throughout France, but it was several years before the cause of the disease was determined.

=== Damage ===
Over 40% of French grape vines and vineyards were devastated over a 15-year period from the late 1850s to the mid-1870s. The French economy was badly hit by the blight: many businesses were lost, and wages in the wine industry were cut to less than half. There was also a noticeable trend of migration to places such as Algiers and America. The production of cheap raisins and sugar wines caused the domestic industry several problems that threatened to persist even after the blight itself. The damage to the French economy is estimated to have been slightly over 10 million Francs.

=== Discovery ===
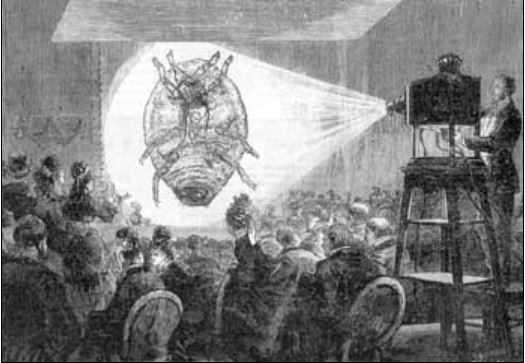
A phylloxera conference in Paris (1874)

Research into the cause of the disease began in 1868, when grape growers in Roquemaure, near Pujaut, asked the agricultural society in Montpellier for help. The society appointed a committee including botanist Jules Émile Planchon, local grower Felix Sahut, and the society's president, Gaston Bazille. Sahut soon noticed that the roots of dying vines were infested with "lice" which were sucking sap from the plants. The committee named the new insect Rhizaphis vastatrix. Planchon consulted French entomologists Victor Antoine Signoret and Jules Lichtenstein (Planchon's brother-in-law). Signoret suggested renaming the insect Phylloxera vastatrix, due to its similarity to Phylloxera quercus, which afflicted oak leaves. In 1869, English entomologist John Obadiah Westwood suggested that an insect that had afflicted grape leaves in England circa 1863 was the same insect afflicting grape vines' roots in France. Also in 1869, Lichtenstein suggested that the French insect was an American "vine louse" that had been identified in 1855 by the American entomologist Asa Fitch, which he had named Pemphigus vitifoliae. However, there was a problem with these suggestions: French grape lice were known to infest only a vine's roots, whereas American grape lice were known to infest only its leaves. The British-born American entomologist Charles Valentine Riley had been following news of the outbreak in France. He sent Signoret specimens of American grape lice, which Signoret concluded – in 1870, while he was besieged in Paris during the Franco-Prussian War – were indeed identical to French grape lice. Meanwhile, Planchon and Lichtenstein had found vines with afflicted leaves; lice that were transferred from those leaves to the roots of healthy vines attached themselves to the vines' roots as other French grape lice did. Also in 1870, Riley discovered that American grape lice wintered on American grape vines' roots, which the insects damaged, albeit less than in the case of French vines. Riley repeated Planchon and Lichtenstein's experiment using American grape vines and American grape lice, with similar results. Thus the identity of the French and American grape lice was proven. Nevertheless, for another three years, a powerful majority in France argued that Phylloxera was not the cause of vine disease; instead, vines that were already sickly became infested with Phylloxera. Thus, in their opinion, Phylloxera was merely a consequence of the "true" disease, which remained to be found. Regardless, Riley had discovered American grape varieties that were especially resistant to Phylloxera, and by 1871, French farmers began to import them and to graft French vines onto the American rootstock. (Leo Laliman had suggested importing American vines as early as 1869, but French farmers were reluctant to abandon their traditional varieties. Gaston Bazille then proposed grafting traditional French vines onto American rootstock.) However, importation of American vines did not entirely solve the problem: some American grape varieties struggled in France's chalky soils and succumbed to Phylloxera. By trial and error, American vines were found that could tolerate chalky soils. Meanwhile, entomologists worked to unravel the strange life cycle of Phylloxera, a project that was completed in 1874.

=== Solution ===
Many growers resorted to their own methods in attempt to resolve the issue. Chemicals and pesticides were used to no avail. In desperation, some growers positioned toads under each vine, and others allowed their poultry to roam free in the hope they would eat the insects. None of these methods were successful.

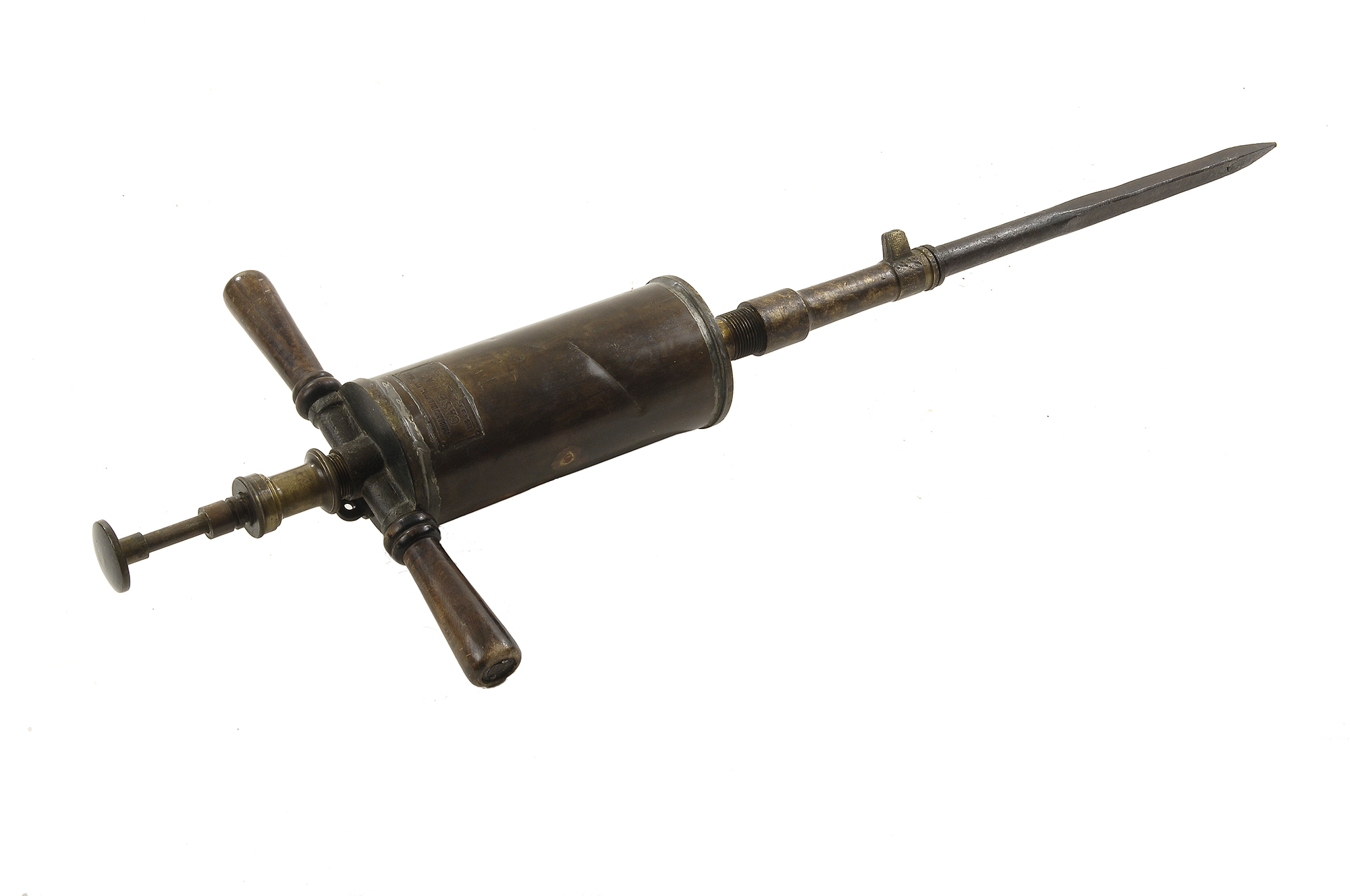
A vine root injector used to combat phylloxera

After Charles Valentine Riley, Missouri's state entomologist, confirmed Planchon's theory, Leo Laliman and Gaston Bazille, two French wine growers, both suggested the possibility that if vinifera vines could be combined, by means of grafting, with the aphid-resistant American vines, then the problem might be solved. Thomas Volney Munson was consulted and provided native Texan rootstocks for grafting. Because of Munson's role, the French government in 1888 sent a delegation to Denison, Texas, to confer on him the French Legion of Honor Chevalier du Mérite Agricole.

Another viticulturist, Hermann Jaeger of Neosho, Missouri, was pivotal in the rescue of the French vineyards, as well. Jaeger working with the Missouri state entomologist George Hussman, had already raised vines with resistance to the pest. Indeed, several of the rootstalk varietals T.V. Munson had developed in Texas (Mrs Munson, Muench, and Neva Munson) were grafts with the hardy Neosho hybrids Jaeger had developed in Missouri. Jaeger exported 17 boxcars of his resistant rootstock to France. In 1893, for his contribution to the grape and wine industries of France, Jaeger was awarded the French Legion of Honor - Chevalier of the Légion d'honneur.[2]

The grafting method was tested, and proved a success. The process was colloquially termed "reconstitution" by French wine growers. The cure for the disease caused a great division in the wine industry: some, who became known as the "chemists", rejected the grafting solution and persisted with the use of pesticides and chemicals. Those who became grafters were known as "Americanists", or "wood merchants". Following the demonstrated success of grafting in the 1870s and 1880s the immense task of "reconstituting" the majority of France's vineyards began.

In the Cognac region, where chalky soils posed particular difficulties for American rootstocks, Léon Benjamin Croizet of Saint-Même-les-Carrières established experimental vineyards from 1871 and a public trial field in 1883, work that Louis Ravaz credited with contributing to the reconstitution of the Charentais vineyard; Croizet received the Legion of Honour in 1902 for these efforts.

==== Prize ====
The French government had offered over 320,000 Francs as a reward to whoever could discover a cure for the blight. Having reportedly been the first to suggest the possibility of using the resistant American rootstock, Leo Laliman tried to claim the money, but the French government refused to award it, with the rationale that he had not cured the blight, but rather stopped it from occurring. However, there may have been other reasons for the government denying Laliman the prize: he was mistrusted by several notable parties, and he was thought by many to have originally introduced the pest.

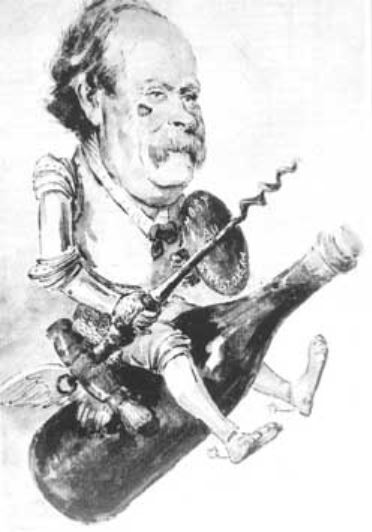
"Death to Phylloxera!" (a French caricature from 1880)

== Present day ==
There is still no remedy, as such, for the Phylloxera, or the disease it brings with it, and it still poses a substantial threat to any vineyard not planted with grafted rootstock. There is only one European grape vine known to be resistant to the Phylloxera, the Assyrtiko vine, which grows on the volcanic Greek island of Santorini; however there is speculation that the actual source of this resistance may arise from the volcanic ash in which the vines grow, and not from the vine itself.

There still exist some vines which have been neither grafted nor destroyed by phylloxera, including some owned by Bollinger and Quinta do Noval, in Portugal.

== Notes and references ==
Specific

General

- Kolleen M. Guy When Champagne Became French: Wine and the Making of a National Identity. JHU Press, 2003. ISBN 0-8018-7164-6
- Fisher, William Edward Garrett (1911). "Phylloxera" . In Chisholm, Hugh (ed.). Encyclopædia Britannica. Vol. 21 (11th ed.). Cambridge University Press. pp. 547–548.
- Gregory McNamee Moveable Feasts: The History, Science, And Lore of Food. Greenwood Press, 2006. ISBN 0-275-98931-3
- California Dept. of Agriculture, California State Commission of Horticulture Biennial Report. Published 1901.
