= Waihīrere =

Settlement in Gisborne District, New Zealand

- Settlement
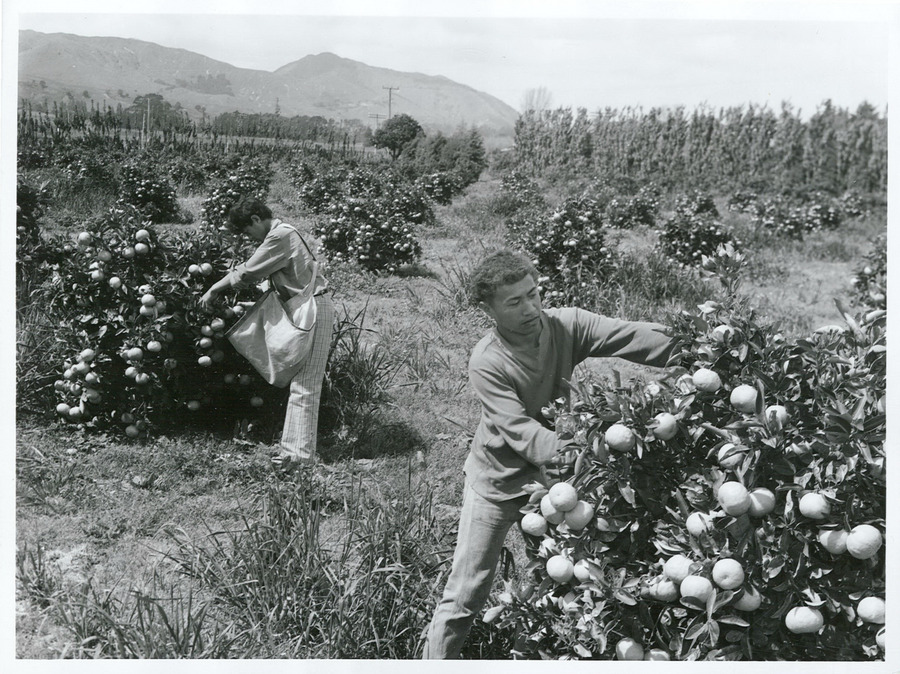
- Growing tangelos at Waihirere orchard
- Interactive map of Waihīrere
- Coordinates: 38.6043683°S 177.9222628°E
- Country: New Zealand
- Region: Gisborne District
- Ward: Tairāwhiti General Ward
- Electorates: East Cape; Ikaroa-Rāwhiti (Māori)

Government
  - Territorial authority: Gisborne District Council
  - Mayor of Gisborne: Rehette Stoltz
  - East Cape MP: Dana Kirkpatrick
  - Ikaroa-Rāwhiti MP: Cushla Tangaere-Manuel

Waihīrere is a settlement and rural area in the Gisborne District of New Zealand's North Island. It is located 16 km (9.9 mi) inland from the coastal city of Gisborne.

The settlement is a stronghold for kapa haka, and is where prominent performer Louise Kingi grew up and learned her skills from elders.

The Rhythm and Vines music festival is located in nearby Waimata Valley.

== Marae ==
Parihimanihi Marae and Te Poho o Māhaki meeting house is a meeting place of the hapū of Ngāi Tūketenui and Ngāti Wahia, from the iwi of Te Aitanga-a-Māhaki.

Hangi Pants, a short film about a conflict at a tangi at the marae, was released in 2020.

In October 2020, the Government committed $102,771 from the Provincial Growth Fund to upgrade Parihimanihi Marae, and create three jobs.

== Parks ==
Waiherere Domain is a public reserve owned and operated by Gisborne District Council, which features a playground, cycleway, dog walking area and picnic area, which is also used for jet skiing and kite surfing.
