= Mulfingen =

- Municipality
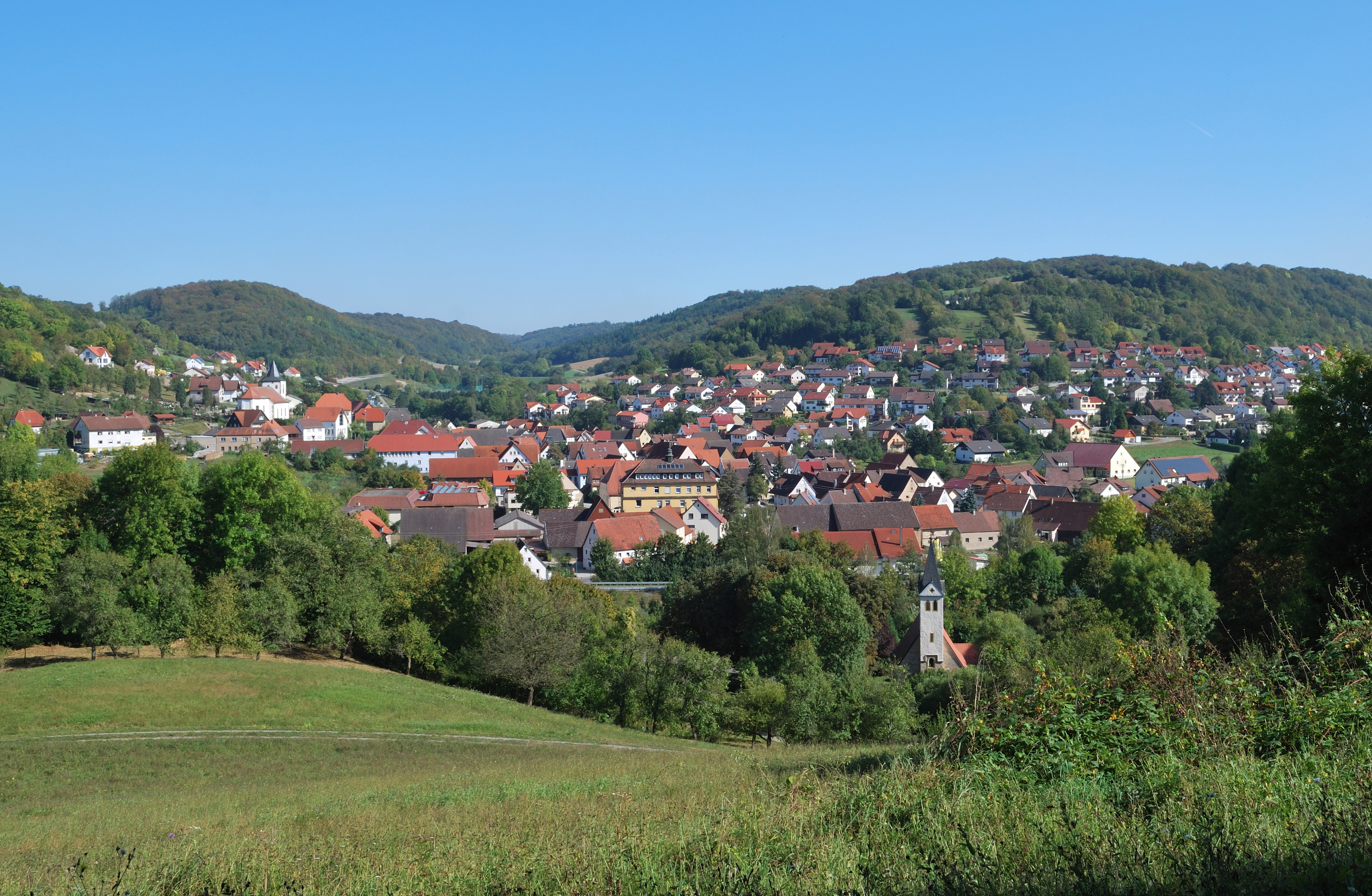
- Mulfingen

- Coat of arms

- Location of Mulfingen within Hohenlohekreis district
- Interactive map of Mulfingen
- Location within Germany Location within Baden-Württemberg
- Coordinates: 49°20′N 9°48′E
- Country: Germany
- State: Baden-Württemberg
- Admin. region: Stuttgart
- District: Hohenlohekreis
- Municipal assoc.: Krautheim
- Subdivisions: 8

Government
  - Mayor (2024–32): Sören Döffinger

Area
  - Total: 80.09 km^{2} (30.92 sq mi)
- Elevation: 263 m (863 ft)

Population (2025-12-31)
  - Total: 3,633
  - Density: 45.36/km^{2} (117.5/sq mi)
- Time zone: UTC+01:00 (CET)
  - Summer (DST): UTC+02:00 (CEST)
- Postal codes: 74673
- Dialling codes: 07938
- Vehicle registration: KÜN, ÖHR
- Website: www.mulfingen.de

Mulfingen (German pronunciation: [ˈmʊlfɪŋən]) is a municipality in the district of Hohenlohe in Baden-Württemberg in Germany.

Friedrich Wohnsiedler (1879–1958), a native of the town, emigrated to New Zealand around 1900 and became a notable wine-maker.

== Demographics ==
Population development:

Year	Inhabitants
1990	3,645
2001	3,855
2011	3,733
2021	3,656
