= Marshall Dawson Miller =

American winemaker

Marshall Dawson Miller (January 2, 1919 – September 9, 2008), also known as Mark Miller, was a New York winemaker and magazine illustrator. Miller was known for being the proprietor of Benmarl Vineyards in the Hudson Valley of Marlboro, N.Y. and being a highly visible public advocate for small wineries. His artwork is famous for romance and was featured in The Saturday Evening Post. His memoir, Wine – A Gentleman's Game: The Adventures of an Amateur Winemaker Turned Professional, was published in 1984.

== Early life and education ==
Miller was born in Eldorado, Oklahoma, where his family owned cotton farms. He studied art in college; first at the University of Oklahoma, and then at the Chouinard Art Institute via transfer.
