= Viticulture =

Cultivation and harvesting of grapes

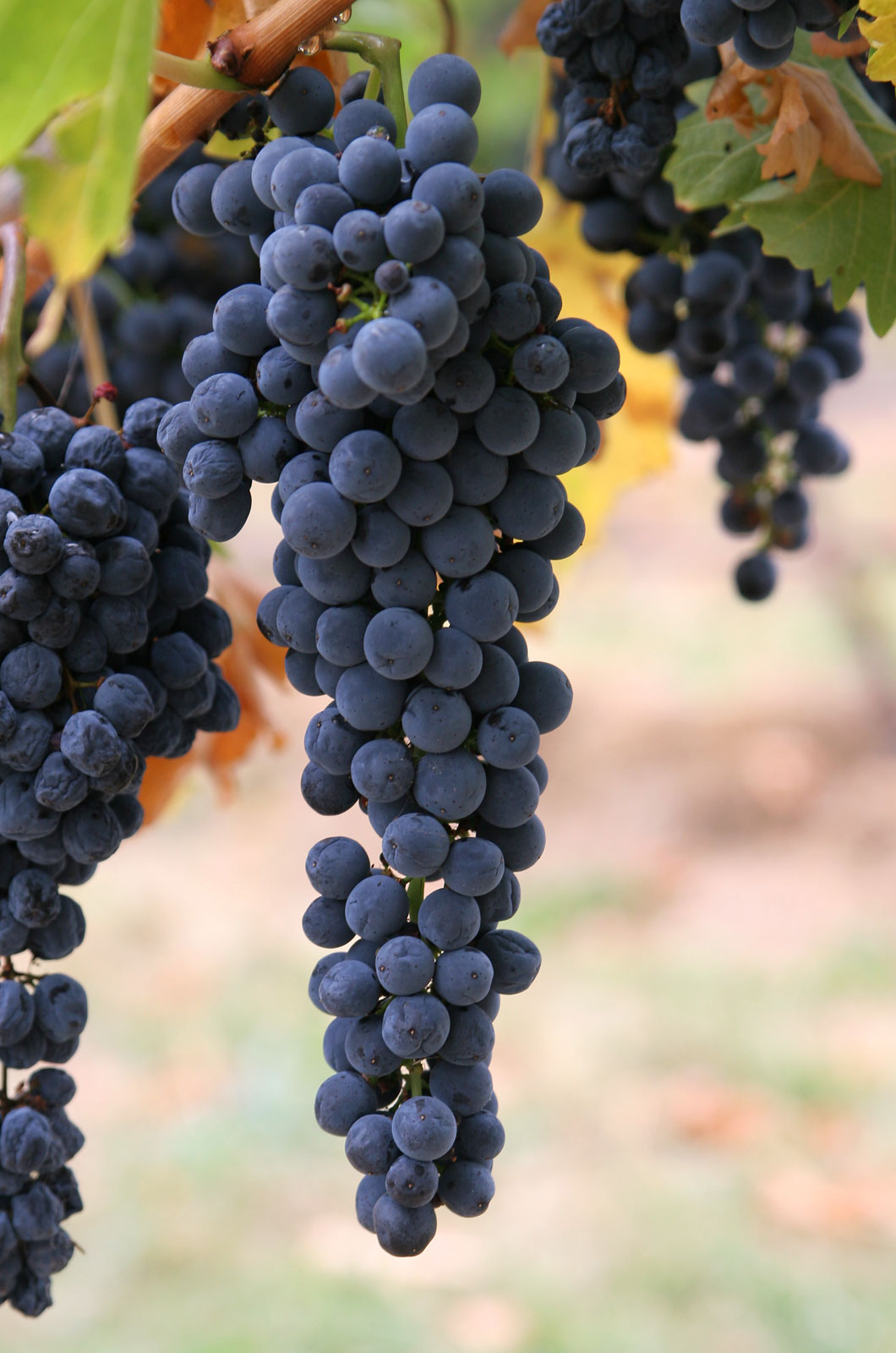
Wine grapes on Long Island

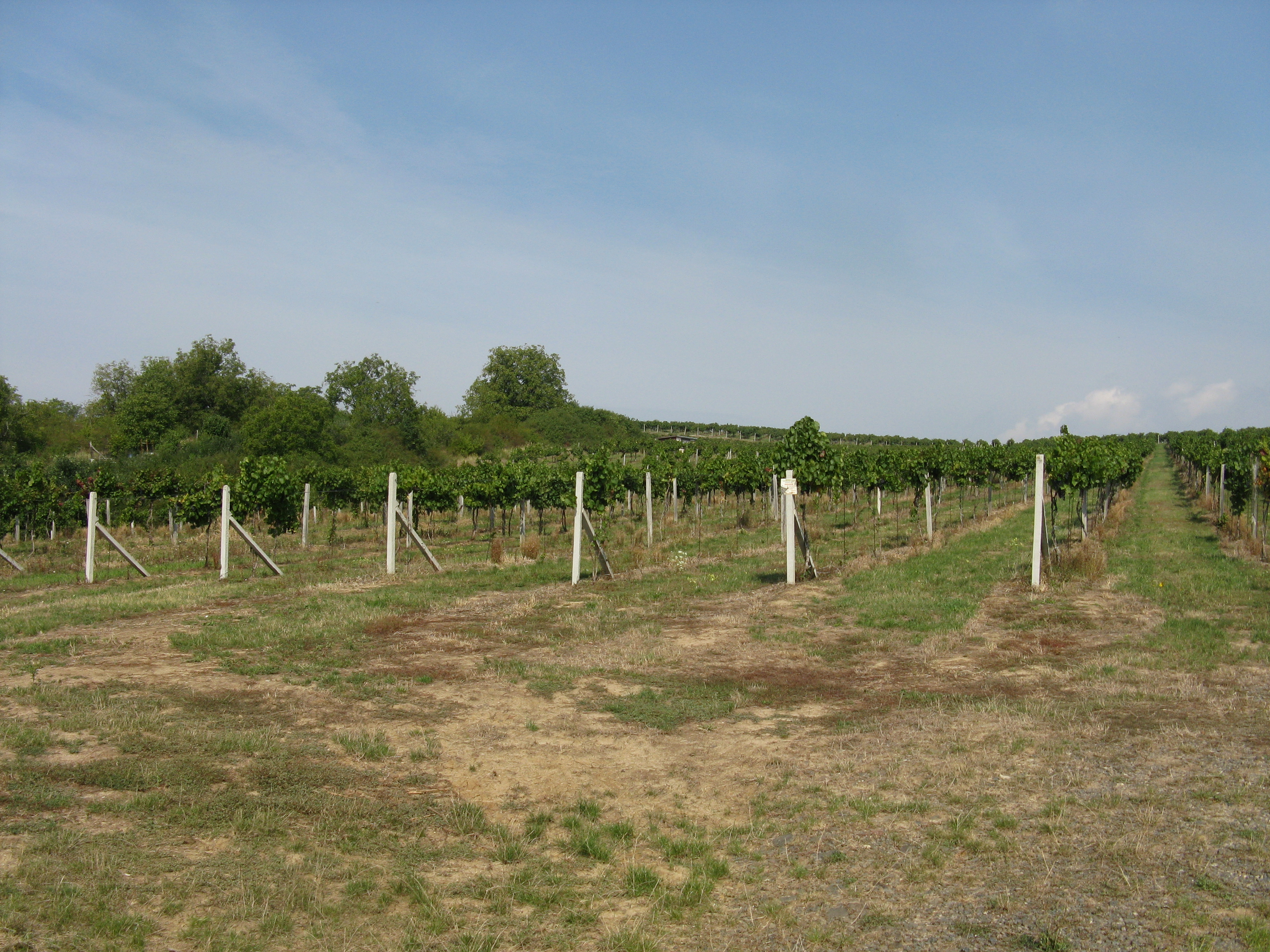
A vineyard in Brhlovce, Slovakia

Viticulture (Latin: vitis cultura, 'vine-growing'), viniculture (vinis cultura, 'wine-growing'), or winegrowing is the cultivation and harvesting of grapes. It is a branch of the science of horticulture. While the native territory of Vitis vinifera, the common grape vine, ranges from Western Europe to the Persian shores of the Caspian Sea, the vine has demonstrated high levels of adaptability to new environments, hence viticulture can be found on every continent except Antarctica.

The duties of a viticulturist include monitoring and controlling pests and diseases, fertilizing, irrigation, canopy management, monitoring fruit development and characteristics, deciding when to harvest, and vine pruning during the winter months. Viticulturists are often intimately involved with winemakers, because vineyard management and the resulting grape characteristics provide the basis from which winemaking can begin. A great number of varieties are now approved in the European Union as true grapes for winegrowing and viticulture.

The history of wine dates back at least 8,000 years. Evidence suggests that some of the earliest domestication of Vitis vinifera occurred in the area of the modern countries Georgia and Armenia. The oldest-known winery was discovered in the "Areni-1" cave in Vayots Dzor, Armenia. Dated to c. 4100 BC, the site contained a wine press, fermentation vats, jars, and cups.

== The grape vine ==
The vast majority of the world's wine-producing regions are found between the temperate latitudes of 30° and 50° in each hemisphere. Within these bands, the annual mean temperatures are between 10 and 20 °C (50 and 68 °F). The presence of large bodies of water and mountain ranges can have positive effects on the climate and vines. Nearby lakes and rivers can serve as protection for drastic temperature drops at night by releasing the heat that the water has stored during the day to warm the vines.

=== Structure of the grape vine ===
There are many different important parts of the grape vine. Starting from the bottom and moving up there are the Fender roots, then above that are the roots. These help with anchorage, absorption and food storage. Then there is the trunk which branches out into arms. These help support conduction. Higher up are the node, inter node, leaves, cluster (of grapes) and the tendril. The tendril helps with support of the plant.

== The grape ==
The grape is classified as a berry. On the vine, grapes are organized through systems known as clusters. Grape clusters can vary in compactness which can result in long clusters (resulting in the grapes spreading out) or short clusters (resulting in grapes packed together). In some grape species, clusters ripen collectively, which allows them to be harvested together. For others, grapes may ripen individually within a cluster. Each grape berry contains a pedicel which attaches to the rachis. The main function of the rachis is to allow the grapes to receive their water and nutrients. The pollination and fertilization of grapes results in one to four seeds within each berry. When fertilization does not occur, seedless grapes are formed, which are sought after for the production of raisins. Regardless of pollination and fertilization, most plants will produce around 100 to 200 grapes.

The skin of the grape accounts for 5 to 20% of the total weight of a grape depending on the variety. When grape skin ripens, it contains the majority of the aromatic substances and tannin. These factors become important in winemaking for methods including color extraction or aroma dissolution. Although the skin contains the majority of the tannin, small percentages can be found throughout the grape and during all of its developmental stages. However, the tannin's most important role is during the grape's ripening stage as its function is to formulate color and body shape.

=== Growing vines ===
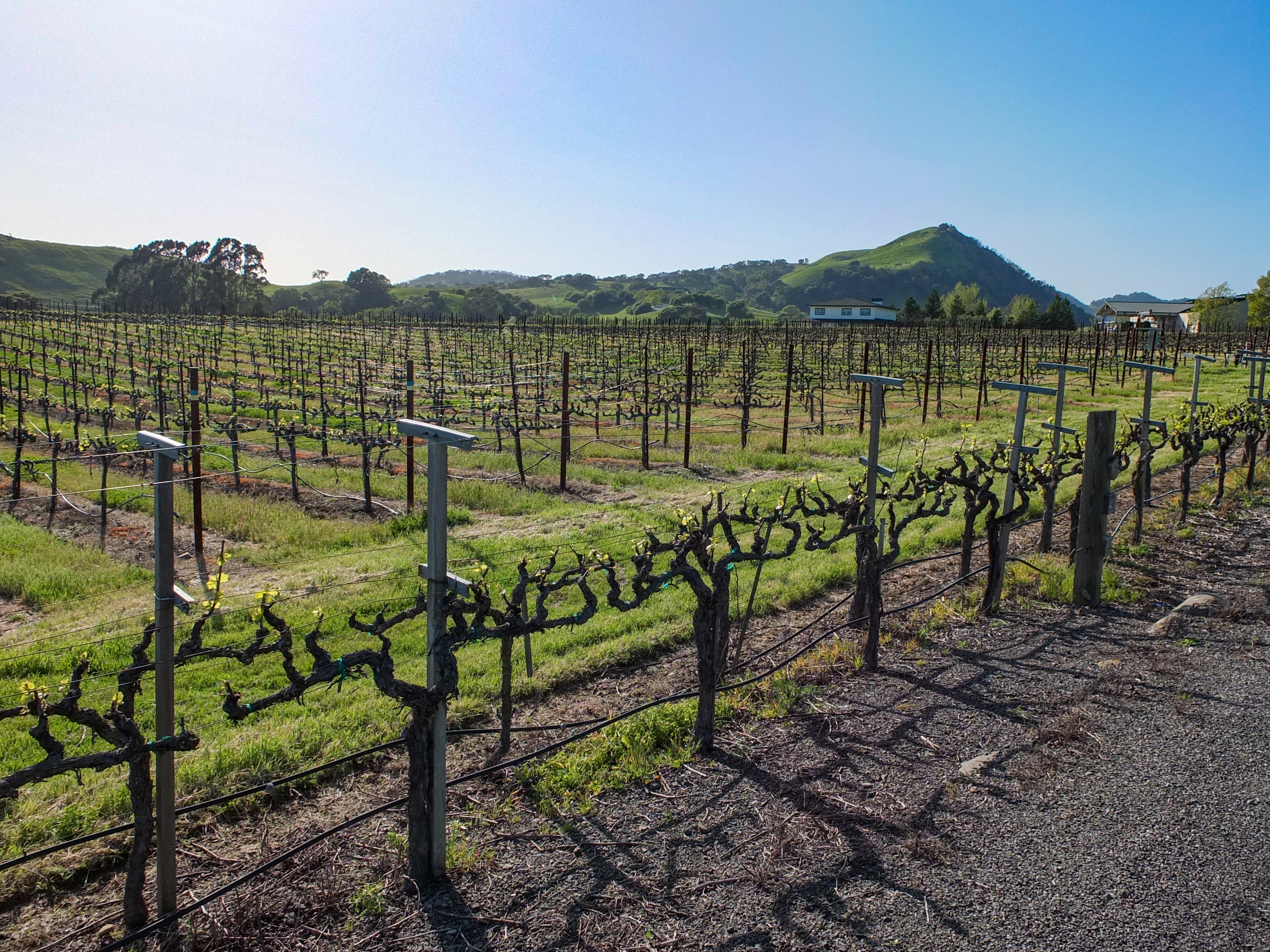
A Napa Valley vineyard on the side of a road

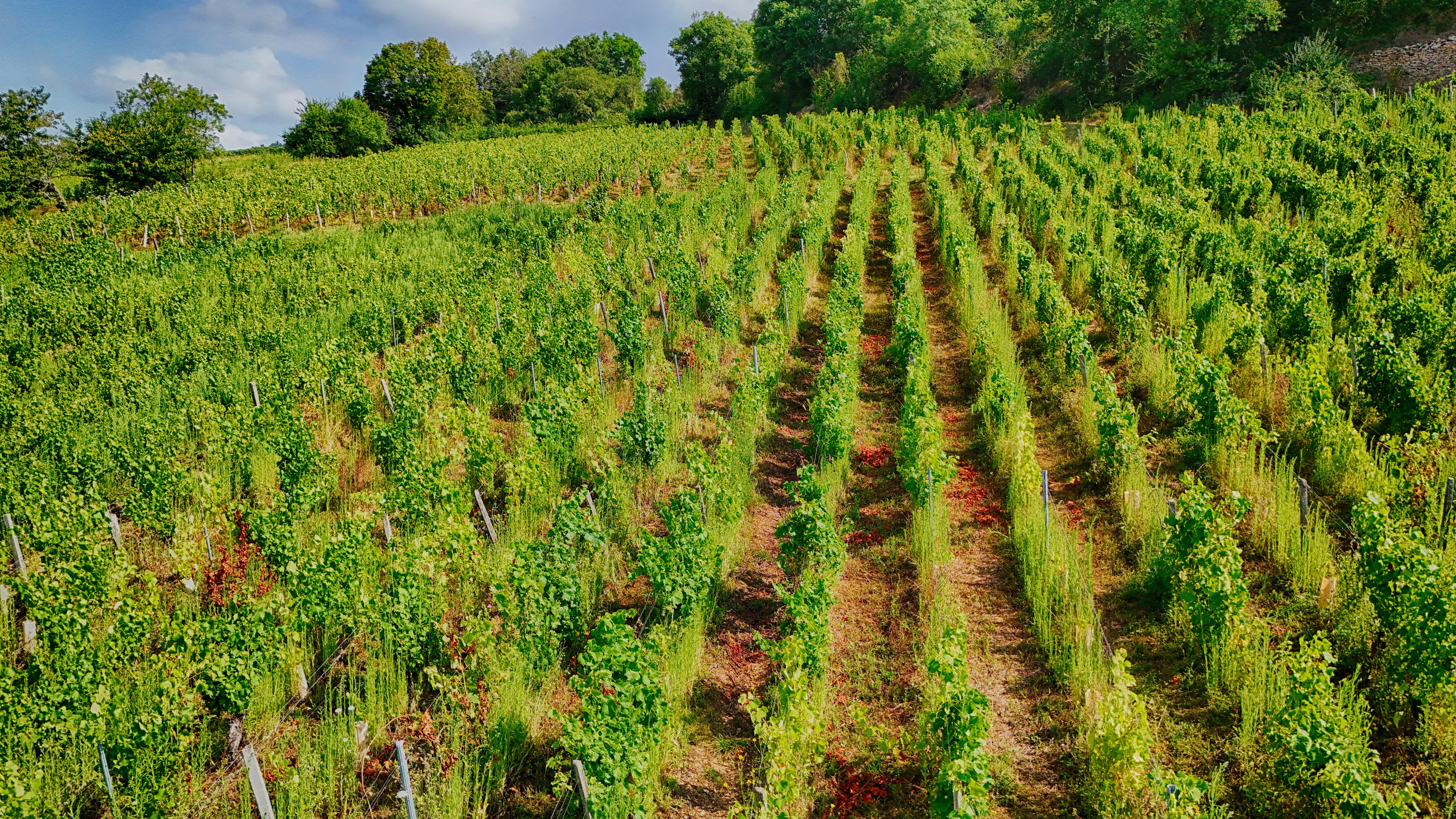
Vineyard rows illustrating grape cultivation practices

Although many factors can affect the overall quality of a grape vine, the three most important are climate, slope, and soil, often collectively referred to as the terroir.

==== Climate ====
Climate is the most significant external factor in determining a grape's inherent qualities. Each grape variety has a uniquely preferred environment for ideal growing. Because climates vary from region to region, selecting the best strain is an important decision in grape cultivation. Additionally, because climatic factors such as temperature and rain can be unpredictable and uncontrollable, each year will produce unique qualities and yields of grapes. Wine grapes are also especially susceptible to climate change and temperature variation.

To yield grapes fit for winemaking, grapevines require roughly 1300–1500 hours of sun during the growing season and an annual rainfall of 690 millimetres (27 in). In ideal circumstances, the vine will receive most of the rainfall during the winter and spring months: rain at harvesttime can create many hazards, such as fungal diseases and berry splitting. The optimum weather during the growing season is a long, warm summer that allows the grapes the opportunity to ripen fully and to develop a balance between the levels of acids and sugars in the grape. Hot and sunny climates have a frost-free growing season of 200 days or more. These climates allow grapes to ripen faster with higher sugar levels and lower acidity. Cooler climates have a frost-free growing season of around 150–160 days. Cooler seasons force the grapes to ripen earlier, which produces a fresher and more acidic harvest. Most crops require an average annual temperature near 15 °C (59 °F) for optimal grape quality.

Summer: Ideal temperatures in summer average around 22 °C (72 °F). Ideal summer temperatures enable fruits to ripen. Temperature and sunshine are the most important factors in ripening.

Winter: Ideal temperatures in winter average around 3 °C (37 °F). Ideal winter temperatures are necessary to allow grape vines to enter their resting phase. If temperatures fall too low, the crops can be injured.

Spring and Fall: Spring and fall are critical seasons for grape development, because the plants are susceptible to frost damage, which can injure the fruiting buds. Wet weather in spring can increase the odds of mildew formation. To prevent mildew, some farms introduce devices such as heaters or large fans in vineyards. However, such solutions can be costly.

==== Slope ====
Hillsides and slopes are preferred over flatter terrain: vines growing on a slope can receive a greater intensity of the sun's rays, with sunshine falling on an angle perpendicular to the hillside. In flatter terrain, the intensity of the sunlight is diluted as it spreads out across a wider surface area. Small slopes that are elevated above surrounding ground are the best and safest places for crops, because these small elevations are less prone to frost. Additionally, a slope affords better drainage, obviating the possibility that the vine might sit in overly moist soil. In cooler regions of the northern hemisphere, south-facing slopes receive more hours of sunlight and are preferred; in warmer climes, north-facing slopes are preferred. In the southern hemisphere, these orientations are reversed.

==== Soil ====
Quality soil is important to allow plants to have better root systems. The growth and health of a vine can be affected if the soil quality is poor. Different grape species prefer various soil conditions, although there are general quality factors. Favorable soil conditions include: aeration, loose texture, good drainage and moderate fertility. Drainage factors are cited as the most important soil characteristic to affect grape vine growth. When root growth is restricted due to bad soil, vine growth and fruit yields lessen and plant survival rates can dip to only a few years.

=== Hazards ===
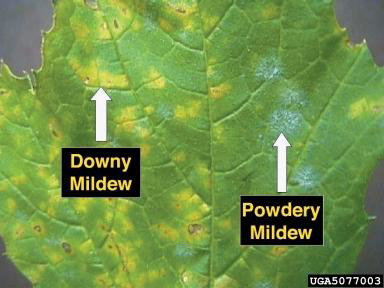
Examples of downy and powdery mildew on a grape leaf

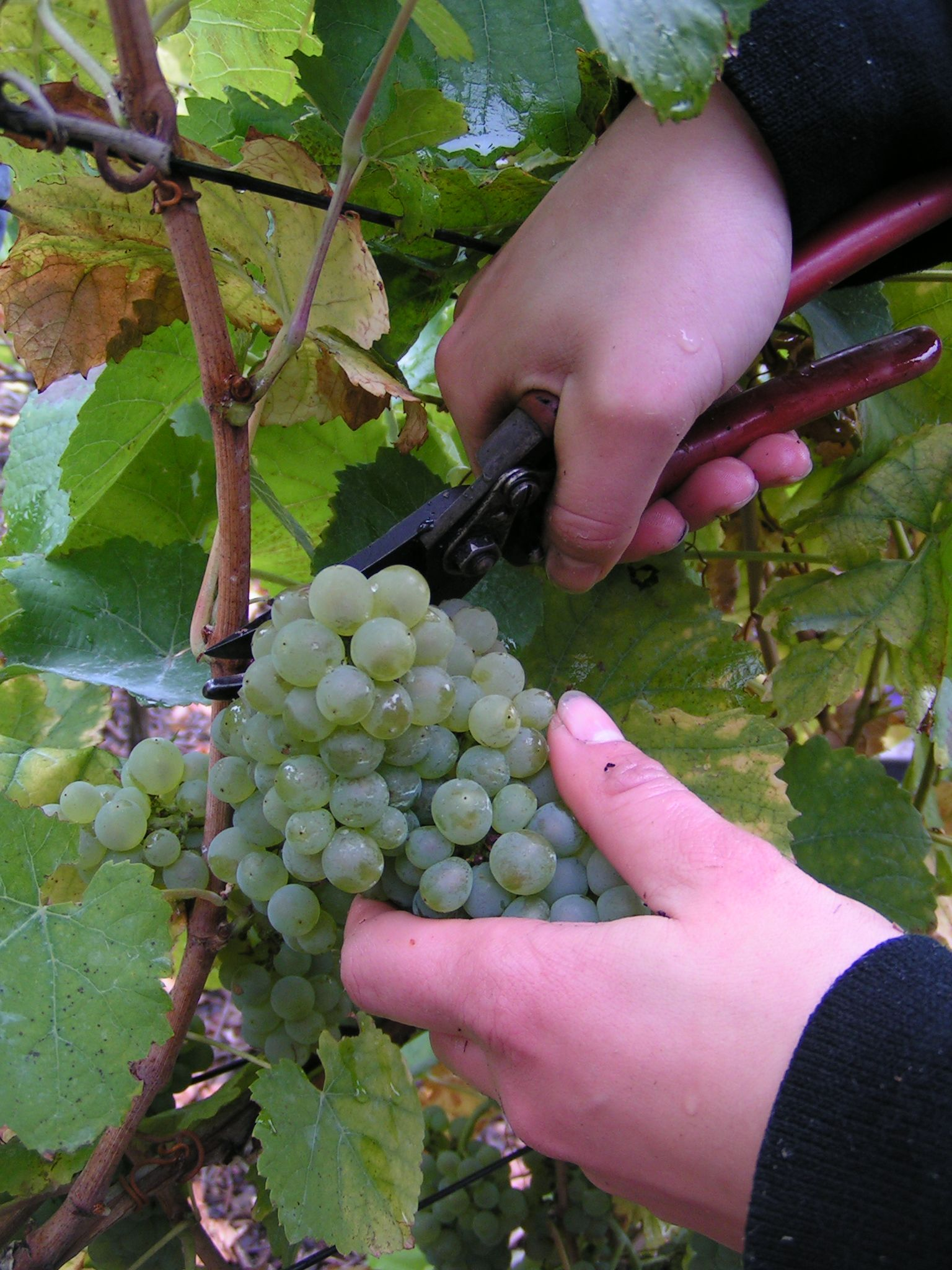
Manual grape gathering

A viticulturist faces many hazards that can have an adverse effect on the wine produced from the grape or kill the vine itself.

- When the vine is flowering, it is very susceptible to strong winds and hail. Cold temperatures during this period can lead to the onset of millerandage, which produces clusters with no seeds and varying sizes. Hot conditions can produce coulure that causes grape clusters to either drop to the ground or not fully develop.
- Erysiphe necator is a powdery mildew species that can infect any or all green parts of the vine. If left untreated, powdery mildew has the potential to be terminal for the plant. It thrives in cooler temperatures and in the shade. Some North American vine species have evolved to show resistance to the mildew.
- Downy mildew (Peronospora) thrives in high temperatures and humidity and produces stains on leaves. It can be treated by spraying plants with copper sulphate. Most American vines are resistant, excluding Vitis vinifera.
- Fanleaf virus is spread by nematodes that breed in the vine stem. It can lead to deformity, yellowing of leaves, and smaller crop yields. There is no cure for the plant; the best course of action is to remove infected plants and leave the remaining roots to rot.
- Frost
- Phylloxera
- Plant virus
- Pests

== Green harvest ==
A green harvest is the removal of immature grape bunches, typically for the purpose of decreasing yield. The removal of the bunches while they are still green induces the vine to put all its energy into developing the remaining grapes. In theory this results in better ripening and the development of more numerous and mature flavour compounds. In the absence of a green harvest, a healthy, vigorous vine can produce dilute, unripe grapes.

In Europe, many appellations restrict the yield permitted from a given area, so there is even more incentive to perform green harvesting when presented with excess crop. Often, the excess must be sold for a pittance and used for industrial alcohol production rather than wine.

While the concept of thinning or sacrificing part of the grape crop, i.e. green harvesting, with the aim of improving the quality of the remaining grapes, predates modern critics, the practice has increased in recent times in vineyards found in California and areas where the grapes grow easily. (McCoy)

== Field blend ==
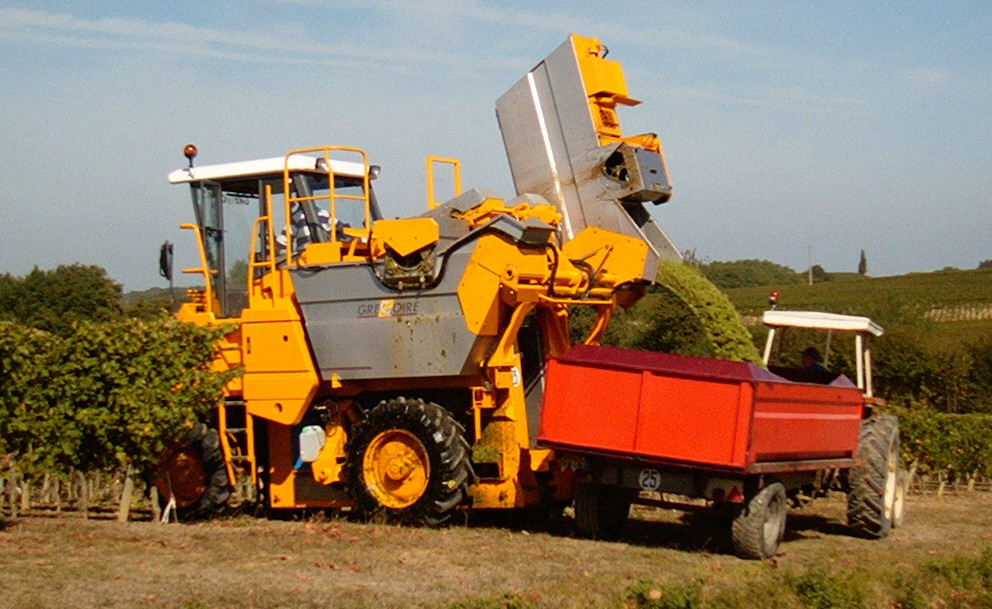
Mechanical harvesting of Sauvignon blanc grapes in Côtes de Duras, France

A field blend is a wine that is produced from two or more different grape varieties interplanted in the same vineyard. In the days before precise varietal identification, let alone rigorous clonal selection, a vineyard might be planted by taking cuttings from another vineyard and therefore approximately copying its genetic makeup. This meant that one vine could be Zinfandel and the next Carignan. When making wine with little equipment to spare for separate vinification of different varieties, field blends allowed effortless, though inflexible, blending.

Fermentation tanks are now cheap enough that the field blend is an anachronism, and almost all wines are assembled by blending from smaller, individual lots. However, in California some of the oldest (and lowest-yielding) Zinfandel comes from vineyards that are field-blended. Ridge Vineyards owns the Lytton Springs vineyards in Sonoma County, which were planted from 1900 to 1905 in what Ridge calls "a traditional field blend of about seventy percent Zinfandel, twenty percent Petite Sirah, and ten percent Grenache and Carignan." There is currently revived interest in field blends because of their potential for uniquely capturing the terroir of vineyard sites. In 2024 Hanna Winery planted a mix of 8 cultivars at their Dry Creek Mountain vineyard: Mission, Alicante Bouschet, Grenache, Tempranillo, Tinta Madeira, Petite Sirah, two clones of Zinfandel and Malvasia Bianca.

Gemischter Satz (Mixed set) is a wine term in German equivalent to a field blend, which means that grapes of different varieties are planted, harvested and vinified together. In older times, this was common, but the practice has almost stopped. It is, however, a specialty of Vienna.

Other traditional field blends include Alsace wine, notably edelzwicker and gentil blends, (Note: These now must be fermented separately, but some co-fermented field blends persist, without being called edelzwicker or gentil.) and Douro wine.

== Sustainability ==
Sustainable production meets the needs of the present generation without restricting the ability of future generations to meet their own needs. At the end of the 1990s the increased implementation of beneficial and environmentally friendlier production methods, such as "integrated viticulture", "organic-biological viticulture" and "biodynamic viticulture" in the vineyards marked the beginning of a more sustainable production in some regions.

Further measures to improve sustainability have been tried in projects: Examples include the combination with wood production. The use of sheep in vineyards (also known as integrated sheep-vineyard systems) would also be a viable dual-use system and could increase land use efficiency and biodiversity. However, the use of pesticides poses intolerable veterinary risks in many forms of implementation. So these risks severely restrict the temporal and spatial possibilities to introduce sheep in vineyards. The sowing of native wild herbs can generate very positive results for species conservation.

== See also ==
- Ampelography
- Annual growth cycle of grapevines
- Diurnal temperature variation
- Global warming and wine
- History of wine
- List of vineyard soil types
- List of viticulturists
- Oenology
- Precision viticulture
- Winemaking
