= Phyllis Zouzounis =

American winemaker

- Occupations: Winemaker; Entrepreneur
- Years active: 1980–present
- Known for: Zinfandel wine
- Notable work: Deux Amis wines
- Partner: Jim Penpraze
- Awards: Gold, Dan Berger's 2011 International Wine Competition; Bronze, 2011 San Francisco Chronicle Wine Competition

Phyllis Zouzounis is an American female winemaker based in Windsor, California, known for Zinfandel wine.

== Biography ==
She is one of the first pioneering professional female winemakers, having begun her career at Dry Creek Vineyard in Sonoma County in 1980.

She started as a winemaker specialized in Zinfandels, and won recognition for wine production using that grape in California.

By 1987, she produced three distinctive Zins under the Deux Amis label (with co-proprietor and winemaking colleague Jim Pempraze) and five more as winemaker at Mazzocco Vineyards.

Wine Enthusiast stated in 1999 that "Phyllis Zouzounis has captured the essence of Zinfandel here", and her 2007 Sonoma County Zinfandel was particularly acclaimed by wine critics. She is also involved in Cabernet Sauvignon and Cabernet Franc production at Raymond Burr Vineyards, Chardonnay at Bedarra Vineyards and Tre Ricci Wines in the Dry Creek Valley, and Viognier and Cabernet at Starlite Vineyards in the Alexander Valley.
