= Sally Johnson =

American female winemaker

Sally Johnson Blum
- Born: July 7, 1974 (age 52); Ann Arbor, Michigan
- Education: University of Michigan, University of California, Davis
- Occupation: Winemaker
- Years active: 1994-present
- Employer(s): https://www.sjbwinemaking.com, https://www.stereographwines.com, https://tamberbey.com, https://thewallsvineyards.com, https://pasxawines.com
- Spouse: Max Blum
- Awards: Multiple 100-point scores from Robert Parker’s The Wine Advocate Three inclusions on Wine Spectator’s annual Top 100 Wines of the World list. More than 30 wines produced under her direction served at White House State Dinners across multiple presidential administrations. Named one of Glamour magazine’s "Top 10 Most Badass Women Winemakers" in the United States.
- Website: https://www.stereographwines.com/

Sally Johnson Blum is an American winemaker. She has received significant critical acclaim, including two 100-point scores from Robert Parker, three inclusions in Wine Spectator’s Top 100 Wines of the World, and more than 30 of her wines served at White House state dinners across multiple administrations. She was named one of Glamour magazine’s “Top 10 Most Badass Women Winemakers” (#3). The San Francisco Chronicle has called her “one of Napa Valley’s most respected winemakers.”

== Early life and education ==
Johnson Blum was born in Ann Arbor, Michigan, into a family with scientific backgrounds. She earned dual bachelor’s degrees in biology and French literature from the University of Michigan in 1996. She became interested in winemaking while studying in France. Later, shecompleted a master’s degree in enology at the University of California, Davis in 1999.

== Early career ==
Johnson Blum began her professional winemaking career in 1999 at St. Francis Winery & Vineyards in Sonoma County, California, advancing from enologist to winemaker over approximately eight years. In 2002, she completed a harvest internship at St. Hallett Winery in Australia’s Barossa Valley and produced small-lot Cabernet Sauvignon and Syrah under her own early personal label for three vintages.

== Pride Mountain Vineyards (2007–2022) ==
In 2007, Johnson Blum joined Pride Mountain Vineyards as winemaker, serving for 15 years. During her tenure she also produced wines for custom clients. Her wines earned consistent high critical praise, including two Robert Parker 100-point scores (2012 and 2013 Reserve Cabernet Sauvignon) and multiple placements in Wine Spectator’s Top 100.

== Robert Mondavi Winery (2022–early 2023) ==
In 2022, Johnson Blum was appointed Director of Winemaking at the historic Robert Mondavi Winery in Oakville. She held the role briefly before departing in early 2023 to pursue independent work.

== Consulting and SJB Winemaking ==
In 2023, Johnson Blum founded SJB Winemaking, a consulting firm through which she works with boutique and premium wine brands. She serves as resident winemaker for Tamber Bey Vineyards in Calistoga and CourAvant wineries in Napa Valley, and consults for producers in Napa, Sonoma, the California Central Coast, and Washington State’s Walla Walla Valley (including The Walls, Pášxa, and Mullan Road Cellars)

== STEREOGRAPH Wines ==
In 2023, Johnson Blum co-founded STEREOGRAPH Wines, a small-production winemaker, with her husband. Johnson Blum handles vineyard sourcing and production; the wines showcase Napa’s diversity through specific sites (e.g., 77–80-year-old Chenin Blanc vines at Henry Ranch in Pope Valley, Oakville Cabernet Sauvignon, Merlot-Cabernet blends from Chiles Valley and Oak Knoll, Carneros Semillon, and others). Releases began in 2025.

== Style and philosophy ==
Johnson Blum is recognized for her work with Cabernet Sauvignon and other Bordeaux varieties, particularly from mountain and diverse Napa sites. She advocates for organic, regenerative, and biodynamic practices and aims to highlight Napa Valley’s terroir diversity while keeping wines approachable.

== Accolades and recognition ==
Johnson Blum’s wines have earned widespread acclaim, including:

- Two 100-point scores from Robert Parker (Pride Mountain 2012 and 2013 Reserve Cabernet Sauvignon).
- Three wines on Wine Spectator’s Top 100 Wines of the World list.
- Over 30 wines served at White House state dinners.
- Named one of Glamour magazine’s “Top 10 Most Badass Women Winemakers” (#3).

She serves on the Napa Valley Vintners Leadership Development Program.

== Personal life ==
Johnson Blum is married to Max Blum, an antique dealer, graphic designer, and musician.
