= Elizabeth Vianna =

American winemaker

- Born: São Paulo, Brazil
- Education: B.A. in Biology; M.Sc. in Fermentation Science, 1999
- Alma mater: Vassar College; University of California, Davis
- Occupation: Winemaker
- Years active: 1999 - present
- Employer: Chimney Rock

Elizabeth Vianna is a female winemaker and businesswoman who has been responsible for some of California's most notable Cabernet wines. She is one of America's few Latina winemakers, known for Bordeaux-style wines at Chimney Rock, a part of Terlato Wine Group.

== Career ==
Vianna came to the wine world by happenstance. She studied biology in undergrad at Vassar College in New York and worked as a clinical toxicologist after completing her undergraduate education. While living in New York City an working in New York Hospital-Cornell Medical Center, she tasted a glass of 1985 Sociando Mallet while at an auction at Chrisie's Auction House.

This newfound appreciation for wine led her to apply to the University of California, Davis for a masters program in winemaking. While in school, Vianna began an internship at Chimney Rock. When she graduated in 1999, Vianna became an enologist at that Napa company, and was named assistant winemaker there in 2002. She then advanced to the position of winemaker in 2005.

In 2011, Vianna was promoted to General Manager of the winery, while continuing in her role as head winemaker of this Stags Leap District estate enterprise.

Over time, Vianna worked with California's top winemakers, including Heidi Barrett, Erin Green, Pam Starr, and Celia Welch.

In 2009, Vianna was honored by the UC, Davis School of Graduate Studies when she was invited to deliver the commencement speech to the class of 2009. She is frequently selected for tasting panels and judging wine competitions.

In 2012, PBS filmed Vianna's work at Chimney Rock for a six-part TV series titled Vintage. The show took viewers behind-the-scenes at three Napa Valley wineries during the 2012 harvest season.

In 2017, Vianna's vines were almost affected by the October northern California wildfires.

== See also ==
- List of wine personalities
