= Peter Fanucchi =

American winemaker

Peter Fanucchi is a Californian winegrower in the Russian River Valley AVA. His winery, Fanucchi Vineyards began using grapes from a plot of land bought by his father in 1972. Already planted with planted at the end of the 19th century Zinfandel, Fanucchi's father originally wanted to pull it out but Fanucchi retrained the vines and for nearly a decade it went into White Zinfandel for. In 1992, he started his own commercial brand and began producing red Zinfandel wine. He also produces white wine made from the Trousseau Gris grape which after his father died in 1984, and at the same time as he was personally farming and restoring the zinfandel field, Peter finished bringing into production. In 2010 Fanucchi farmed the last known block of Trousseau Gris.
