= Yeringberg =

Heritage-listed winery, stables, and vineyard in Melbourne, Victoria, Australia

- Location of the winery and vineyard in Greater Metropolitan Melbourne
- Interactive map of the Yeringberg area
- Former names: Yering Station

General information
- Status: Completed
- Type: Winery, stables, vineyards
- Architectural style: Victorian Free Classical
- Location: 810–812 Maroondah Highway, Yering, Yarra Ranges, Melbourne, Victoria, Australia
- Coordinates: 37°41′24″S 145°26′04″E
- Groundbreaking: 1863 (first vines planted)
- Completed: 1885; 141 years ago
- Client: Baron Guillaume de Pury
- Owner: de Pury family

Technical details
- Material: Timber; bricks; corrugated iron; stone
- Floor count: 1 (winery); 2 (stables)
- Grounds: 450 ha (1,100 acres)

Design and construction
- Main contractor: David Mitchell

Website
- yeringberg.com.au

Victorian Heritage Register
- Official name: Yeringberg
- Type: Registered place
- Designated: 24 August 1988
- Reference no.: H0694
- Heritage overlay no.: HO1
- Categories: Farming and Grazing; Residential buildings (private)

Register of the National Estate
- Official name: Yeringberg Winery and Stables
- Type: Defunct register
- Designated: 21 March 1978
- Reference no.: 5704

Yeringberg is a winery and vineyard complex, located at 810–812 Maroondah Highway in Yering, in the Yarra Ranges, in the north eastern suburbs of Melbourne, in Victoria, Australia.

Established from 1862 on the traditional lands of the Wurundjeri people, the winery and stables were added to the Victorian Heritage Register on 24 August 1988 in recognition of their historical and architectural significance; and were also added to non-statutory lists by the Victorian branch of the National Trust on 2 February 1967 and the now defunct Register of the National Estate on 21 March 1978.

== History ==
=== Yering Station ===
Originally known as Yering Station, the pastoral run was established in 1837 by prominent settlers William Ryrie, and his brothers, Donald and James. The 17,401-hectare (43,000-acre) Yering Station is associated with the earliest phase of grazing and settlement in the region, only months after Governor Sir Richard Bourke's proclamation authorising settlement of the Port Phillip District. The Ryrie brothers drove 250 head of cattle from the Braidwood district of New South Wales, depasturing their stock in the Upper Yarra Valley. A home station was established at Yering and two outstations established on the northern side of the Yarra River, at Tarrawarra and Dalry. (Note: Dalry was later developed as a vineyard by Hubert de Castella, an elder brother of Paul de Castella.) In August 1838 the Ryries, with the help of Swiss vigneron, James Dardel, planted a four-thousand-square-metre (one-acre) vineyard, and are thought to have produced the first wine made in the Colony. (Note: Although, this claim is unclear.)

In 1850 Donald Ryrie sold Yering Station and a seven-room pre-fabricated house to Paul de Castella, who had arrived in the Port Phillip District from Neuchatel, Switzerland in 1849. From 1852, de Castella and his brother, Hubert, were assisted with the management of the cattle station by Samuel de Pury and his brother, Guillaume. In 1859, the de Castella brothers imported cellar equipment and ten thousand vines, half of which were Sauvignon and two thousand La Folle (the grape used for making the best Cognac), the latter of which were all failures. The property was renamed as Chateau Yering and developed from grazing to wine-making, with the assistance of the de Pury brothers. In 1889, Paul de Castella won a Grand Pix for his wine at Paris Exhibition.

=== Yeringberg ===
Yeringberg was established by Baron Guillaume de Pury in 1862 and developed to become a leading winery. De Pury was a Swiss nobleman and a leader of the emigre Swiss community in the Colony of Victoria in the nineteenth century. Swiss emigration to Victoria was encouraged by Lieutenant-Governor Charles La Trobe who was well known in Swiss aristocratic circles and whose wife Sophie was Swiss. De Pury and his brother, Samuel, arrived in Australia in 1852 and began initially working with Paul de Castella at the adjacent Chateau Yering.

In 1863, De Pury purchased 450 hectares (1,100 acres) of which he planted 32 hectares (79 acres) of vines and grazed sheep and cattle on the remaining portion. By 1868, the wines and vineyard were receiving favourable reviews. De Pury designed a two-storey timber winery, with a loading structure on posts, that was built in c. 1870 by David Mitchell, the father of Dame Nellie Melba. A unique component to the design was the gravity-fed winery and cellar, capable of making and storing approximately 110,000 litres (24,000 imp gal; 29,000 US gal) of wine. The single storey brick stables were built c. 1885, possibly also by Mitchell; and other buildings remain; although the former homestead was destroyed by fire.

Baron Guillaume de Pury died suddenly in 1890 on a visit to Switzerland. His son, George, aged 20 years, assumed management of the winery and developed Yeringberg into a successful 19th-century Victorian vineyard that was dominated by Chateau Yering. Hubert de Castella's vineyard, St. Hubert's, also developed into a leading winery. Yeringberg wines won awards in Australia, London, Bordeaux, Paris, Brussels and San Francisco, the latter including a Gold Medal at the 1915 Panama-Pacific International Exposition, to mark the opening of the Panama Canal. In 1889, it was reported that Queen Victoria ordered a quantity of Yerinberg 1884 vintage wine. Yeringberg was particularly noted for the quality of its white wine made from the Marsanne grape.

During the 1920s, wine production in region ceased and Yeringberg was returned to grazing for cattle and sheep, together with thoroughbred horses, operated by George de Pury until his death in 1956, when management of the estate was assumed by his only child, Guillaume ("Guill") George de Pury, who re-established Yerinberg for the production of wine from the late 1960s. The fourth generation of the de Pury family assumed responsibility for operations from the late-20th century.

== Description ==
Yeringberg Winery and Stables is a complex of buildings important for their representation of the early and internationally recognised wine growing industry of the Yarra Valley, an industry that re-emerged in the 1960s. Yeringberg has strong associations with the European migrants who settled the area and brought their wineries to national prominence. Architecturally the buildings are distinctive and unusual, stylistically and technically. The form and detailing of the winery is particularly notable.

The stables and winery were built between c. 1885 – c. 1891. The winery is built of timber with a corrugated iron roof and stone cellar. The winery is intact with original plant and tools. The plan of the winery is unusual in its provision for the movement of grapes and wine during production and storage, and its resolution in three dimensions. This has been expressed in the form and detail of the building which is both unique and remarkable. The plan of the stables is not remarkable in itself. There are stalls and harness rooms on the ground floor and a hay loft above. The stables are built of local bricks.

The homestead, which was rebuilt and extended, was destroyed by fire. All that remains of the early homestead buildings is the tutor's cottage and the fountain.

== See also ==
- Architecture of Melbourne
- List of places on the Victorian Heritage Register in the Shire of Yarra Ranges
- Victorian wine
- Yarra Valley wine region
