= Charterisville =

Heritage-listed house in Melbourne, Victoria, Australia

- Location of the house in Greater Metropolitan Melbourne
- Interactive map of the Charterisville area

General information
- Status: Completed
- Type: Former mansion and farm; Now house
- Architectural style: Old Colonial Georgian
- Location: 77–79 Burke Road, Ivanhoe, City of Banyule, Melbourne, Victoria, Australia
- Coordinates: 37°46′27″S 145°03′51″E
- Completed: 1840; 186 years ago

Technical details
- Material: Bricks; bluestone; sandstone; slate; timber; plaster; marble
- Grounds: 68 ha (168 acres) (in 1888); 2,000 m^{2} (0.5 acres) (1980)

Design and construction
- Architects: Robert Russell (attrib.); John Gill (attrib.)

Victorian Heritage Register
- Official name: Charterisville
- Type: Registered place
- Designated: 8 February 1996
- Reference no.: H1140
- Heritage overlay no.: HO15
- Category: Residential buildings (private)

Register of the National Estate
- Official name: Charterisville
- Type: Defunct register
- Designated: 21 March 1978
- Reference no.: 5609

Charterisville is a former mansion and former farm, now house, located at 77–79 Burke Road in Ivanhoe, in the City of Banyule, in the northern suburbs of Melbourne, in Victoria, Australia. The property is closely associated with the Heidelberg School of Australian art.

Built in c. 1840, on the traditional lands of the Wurundjeri people, the house was added to the Victorian Heritage Register on 8 February 1996 in recognition of its historical significance; and was also added to non-statutory lists by the Victorian branch of the National Trust on 12 May 1960 and the now defunct Register of the National Estate on 21 March 1978.

== History ==
=== David Charteris McArthur era ===
From 1839 onwards, Thomas Walker subdivided land known as Crown Portion 2 (1838) and sold 34 hectares (84 acres) to David Charteris McArthur for £350. McArthur opened Melbourne's first bank, the Bank of Australasia in August 1838 and may have moved to Charterisville, while still keeping a "cottage" in Little Collins Street, built during 1840. When built, the property comprised a single-storey mansion, with coachhouse, cottages, stables and winery. McArthur developed a prize-winning fruit orchard on the estate, and his wife was an early apiarist.

McArthur was active within Melbourne. In addition to his business activities, he played in first recorded cricket match in Victoria and was later captain and president of the Melbourne Cricket Club. His services included becoming the first chairman of the Associated Banks, one of the five original trustees of the Melbourne Public Library Trustees (1853), president of the Public Library, a trustee of the Museums and National Gallery of Victoria (1880-83), chairman of trustees of the Austin Hospital – together with William Guilfoyle, the director of the Royal Botanic Gardens director – president of the Old Colonists Association, and chairman of the Trustees Executors and Agency Co.

A mortgage taken out on his property during 1840 suggest improvements at this time. However, the 1841 Census of the Colony of New South Wales did not record that McArthur resided at Charterisville, it describes the house as being of timber, noting that eight persons resided there. McArthur left Melbourne in mid-1844 to manage the Hobart branch for a short period and returned to Melbourne in 1845 to a depressed economy which required that he submit to a reduction in salary. McArthur remained in Melbourne and Charterisville for a long period, and received regular rises in salary from 1848 onwards, with absences to travel around the Colony during the gold period to open branches at the various diggings. William Darkes, McArthur's brother-in-law, owned "Waverley", an undeveloped property that adjoined Charterisville. McArthur acquired "Waverley" in 1853 for £850, and then mortgaged the property in 1856 for £15,000; hence it is likely that a substantial part of the Charterisville mansion was built in the period 1853–1856.

McArthur took a £6,000 mortgage on Charterisville in 1861 indicating that further improvements may have taken place to that date. The timing and extent of these improvements is uncertain as McArthur's movements were even more varied than his frequent gold field trips of 1854. He travelled in Europe during 1861-62, went to New Zealand to open branches in 1862-63, and managed the Sydney branch from 1863 until his elevation to Superintendent meant his return to Melbourne in 1868 and his semi-retirement in 1877. It is likely, however, that the third extension, the brick facing and northern wing of the house (subsequently demolished), was added in the Italianate style after 1868 and before his retirement, and the second extension was done in 1861, or they may have been completed concurrently.

=== Development as an artist's retreat ===
After McArthur's death in 1887, the combined Charterisville and Waverley estate, by then 68 hectares (168 acres), was sold at auction to John Fergusson and John Roberts, who sublet the south half of the house to landscape artist, Walter Withers and his wife from 1890 to 1894. It was later reported that the property was in a ruinous condition around this time. The associated lodges were sublet to artists Hal Waugh, Arthur Bassett, Fred Monteath, Tom Humphrey and Leon Pole, amongst others. The second wave of tenants included Harry Recknall, cartoonist Heiner 'Ernest' Egersdorfer, and Jack Gordon. They were followed by Will Dyson, James Peter Quinn and Max Meldrum.

In the summer of 1897–98 Norman Lindsay, Lionel Lindsay and Ernest Moffitt spent some months living in the gardener's cottage. It was here that Lionel introduced Norman to the techniques of etching (and was possibly introduced to German black and white art by Egersdorfer). It is believed Arthur Streeton painted his famous Still Glides the Stream here.

Described in a 2018 heritage report for the Banyule City Council:

The group occupied a large somewhat derelict property at Eaglemont that was part of the Charterisville estate. This was situated close to the river and offered views of the river and the distant hills. The site had a tangled, unkempt garden with fruit trees and a ruined fountain, and provided an ideal and inspiring setting for landscape painters. Heidelberg was something of a backwater in the 1880s. With no direct rail connection to Melbourne, it was relatively isolated from the city and still considered to be ‘in the country’. Here, suburban expansion was yet to happen. The wider area was characterised by paddocks and gentle hills with pockets of bushland; large areas of the river front were already reserved from sale as Crown land. The locality offered both idyllic rural scenery and affordable rent: both were ideal conditions for an artistic community.

— Banyule Thematic Environmental History (Report), 2018.

Australia's first recognised summer school of art was run by E. Phillips Fox and Tudor St. George Tucker from 1893 to 1901, called the Melbourne Art School. (Note: Also known as the Melbourne School of Art.) Fox took over the lease from Withers in 1894. Australian women's artists Jessie Lavington Evans, Violet Teague, Mary Meyer and Ina Gregory were among those who studied under Fox and painted in the vast grounds of Charterisville. Female students Asquith Baker and Ursula Foster were notable subjects of Fox's own paintings; and other students included Hugh Ramsay. Marshal Hall, director of the Conservatorium of Music occupied one cottage, later occupied by Ernest Moffat. Fox and Tucker left for Europe in 1902. The new tenants included cartoonists Alfred Vincent and Alex Sass. Etcher John Shirlow, watercolourist Alexander McClintock, pastellist Alf Fisher, sculptor W. Wallace Anderson, W. S. Wemyss and Frank Crozier are recorded as having worked there.

Charterisville was used for outdoor scenes for the successful 1905 movie The Story of the Kelly Gang. The work of the Tait brothers – produced by John Tait and Nevin Tait, directed by Charles Tait to a script by Frank and John – it was billed as "the longest film ever made" and was profitable for its backers. Charterisville was at the time being leased as a dairy farm by members of the Tait family.

=== Ownership by the de Castella family ===
Hubert de Castella and his brother, Paul, were notable vignerons in the Yering area. Paul owned Chateau Yering and Hubert, who arrived in Australia in 1854, planted vines at St. Hubert's vineyard in Yering in 1862. Hubert returned to Switzerland in 1886 and settled permanently at Charterisville with his family from 1906, until his death the following year. The property passed to Hubert's son, François, and then his son, Rolet, and remained in the family until c. 1965. The de Castella family temporarily repurposed the house during World War II as a convalescent hospital, and were later responsible for demolishing the northern bay in 1962 for a subdivision, and also the previous subdivisions of 1916, 1920, 1927 and 1939 which had removed the lodges and most of the grounds.

=== Subsequent owners ===
Briefly owned by racing car driver, Bob Jane, who sought to demolish the dwelling, the property was acquired by Donald Merry, an economist, and his wife, who restored the property from c. 1965. In 1980, it was reported that the owners of the house, set on 2,000 square metres (0.5 acres), were Mr and Mrs Peter Wilson.

== Description ==
The architect of Charterisville is unknown but the work may be attributed to either Robert Russell, who designed the new Bank of Australasia branch of 1840, or John Gill, who designed the Heidelberg Road Board toll house (which McArthur was closely associated with) in 1854. Gill was responsible for at least three commissions in Heidelberg, including the Banyule Homestead, additions for Robert Martin, and another unnamed house in 1845 – which may have been Charterisville.

Charterisville is a single-storey residence completed in the Old Colonial Georgian style with walls mostly of sandstone construction on bluestone base walls and a low-pitched slated roof.

As completed by the 1860s, the house had a U-shaped plan form, with a long east-facing front wing and north and south wings extending to the rear to form a courtyard. On the front elevation is a verandah, facing the earliest section of the house. An extensive cellar was built under the drawing room. The north wing was demolished in 1962 and rear verandahs enclosed on both sides by projecting gabled wings with canted bay windows. A former verandah at the rear, now enclosed, extends along the full length of the front and south wings. A cellar extends under the drawing room.

With the exception of the demolished north wing, the majority of the exterior of the building appears to remain substantially as altered by the late 19th century. The east elevation of the original section of the house, enclosed by the front verandah, is rendered. The remainder of the front elevation is faced with red brick above the bluestone base wall, with white brick surrounds to the projecting bay window. The south and west elevations of the south wing have sandstone random rubble walls with dressed bluestone quoins and window surrounds. The windows to the east and south elevations have 19th-century double hung sashes with margin glazing bars. The front verandah, enclosed by folding windows by the early 20th century, was rebuilt in the 1980s and has more recent aluminium windows. The rear verandah retains possibly original chamfered timber posts, diagonal brackets and beams, and has been enclosed, probably in the late 19th century, with wide horizontal boarding with rusticated joints.

Internally, most rooms retain 19th-century moulded skirtings and architraves and panelled doors and window reveals. The third bedroom is enclosed with a 1930s timber-framed partition. Some floors have been repaired with hardwood boards, but the majority of the original softwood boarding appears to remain. Some plaster repairs have been carried out recently to the walls and all of the ceilings have been relined with plasterboard. The moulded cornice in the drawing room appears to be original. New cornices have been installed in the other rooms along the front of the house and ceiling roses have been installed in the drawing room and principal bedroom. The drawing room contains a 19th century white marble mantelpiece and open fireplace. The fireplace in the principal bedroom has been opened up and a new mantelpiece installed recently.

== Other places ==
Charterisville Avenue in the Canberra suburb of Conder is named in recognition of the artists' camp of the Heidelberg School.

== See also ==
- Architecture of Melbourne
- List of places on the Victorian Heritage Register in the City of Banyule
