= Jean-Edouard de Castella =

Swiss artist (1881–1966)

- Born: 21 November 1881; Lilydale, Australia
- Died: 26 July 1966 (aged 84); Fribourg, Switzerland
- Known for: Painting

Jean-Edouard (or Jean-Edward) de Castella (1881 in Lilydale, Australia – 1966 in Fribourg), was a Swiss painter and illustrator.

== Biography ==
Born in Australia in 1881, Jean-Edouard de Castella moved to Switzerland with his father Hubert de Castella and his family in 1886. He was a descendant of the Seigneurs de Castella, a noble family from Gruyère. He was the nephew of Paul de Castella and Lilly de Castella. In 1901 he entered the Academy of Fine Arts in Munich where he met Paul Klee with whom he then travels to Italy. He attended Ferdinand Hodler's classes together with his sister Nathalie at the Technicum in Fribourg where he studied with Raymond Buchs, Hiram Brülhart or Oswald Pilloud.

In 1903 he went to the Académie Julian in Paris. He regularly attended the Salon fribourgeois of the Swiss Society of Painters, Sculptors and Architects. In 1932 he created an art gallery in Fribourg, the Salon d'art permanent du Capitole where he mainly exhibits works by Swiss artists. This was unfortunately not as successful as he expected and the gallery closed two years later.

He made many stained glass windows for public buildings as well as churches. In 1918 he made a cycle of windows for the chapel of Our Lady of Bourguillon close to Fribourg. He then also collaborated with Alexandre Cingria and Eugène Dunand. He also illustrated fairy tales by Hans Christian Andersen and Perrault.

== Works in public institutions ==
- Art Nouveau stained glass windows for the chapel of Our Lady of Bourguillon (Fribourg), 1918.
