= Chateau Yering =

Heritage-listed house in Melbourne, Victoria, Australia

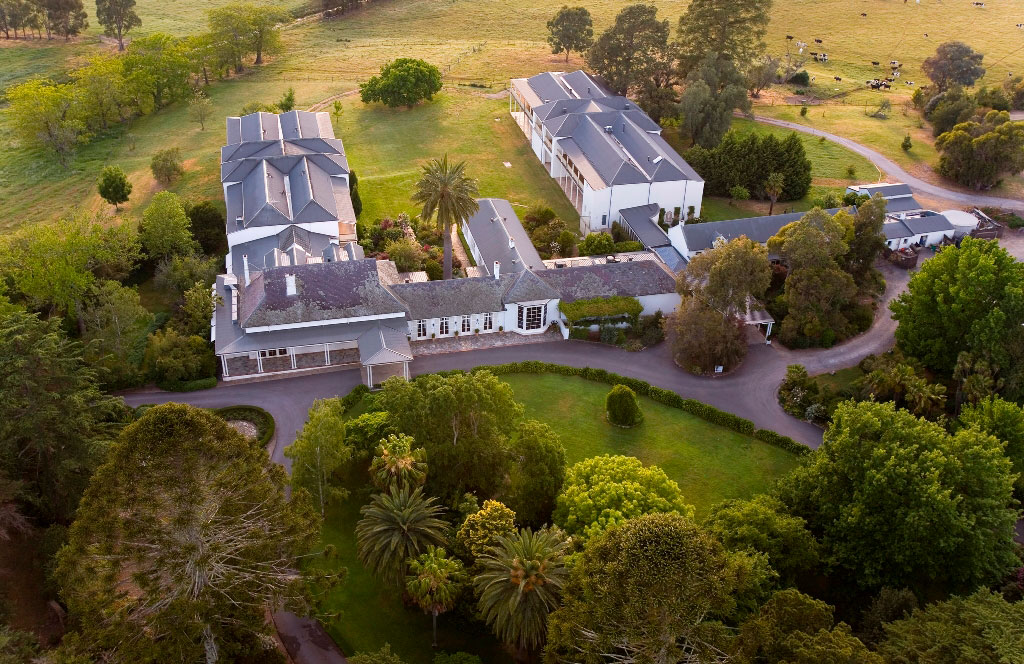
- Aerial view of the homestead, redeveloped as a luxury hotel, 2019

- Location of the homestead in Greater Metropolitan Melbourne
- Interactive map of the Chateau Yering area
- Former names: Yering Station
- Alternative names: Yering homestead

General information
- Status: Completed
- Type: Homestead (1854–1996); Luxury hotel (since 1996)
- Architectural style: Victorian Georgian
- Location: 38–42 Melba Highway, Coldstream, Yarra Ranges, Melbourne, Victoria, Australia
- Coordinates: 37°40′31″S 145°22′58″E
- Completed: 1854; 172 years ago

Technical details
- Material: Bricks; slate; marble; timber; glass; corrugated iron; stone
- Grounds: 101 ha (250 acres)

Website
- chateauyering.com.au

Victorian Heritage Register
- Official name: Chateau Yering
- Type: Registered place
- Designated: 7 December 1995
- Reference no.: H1139
- Heritage overlay no.: HO68
- Categories: Farming and Grazing; Residential buildings (private)

Register of the National Estate
- Official name: Chateau Yering
- Type: Defunct register
- Designated: undated
- Reference no.: 102883

Chateau Yering, also known as the Yering homestead, is a former homestead and its surrounding vineyards, and now luxury hotel complex, located at 38–42 Melba Highway in Coldstream, in the Yarra Ranges, in the north eastern suburbs of Melbourne, in Victoria, Australia.

Built in 1854 on the traditional lands of the Wurundjeri people, the former homestead was added to the Victorian Heritage Register on 7 December 1995 in recognition of its historical and architectural significance; and was also added to non-statutory lists by the Victorian branch of the National Trust on 3 August 1998 and the now defunct Register of the National Estate on an unknown date.

== History ==
=== Cattle station ===
Chateau Yering, known originally as Yering Station, was established as a pastoral run in 1837, by prominent settlers William Ryrie, and his brothers, Donald and James. The 17,401-hectare (43,000-acre) property is associated with the earliest phase of grazing and settlement in the region, only months after Governor Sir Richard Bourke's proclamation authorising settlement of the Port Phillip District.

The Ryrie brothers drove 250 head of cattle from the Braidwood district of New South Wales, depasturing their stock in the Upper Yarra Valley. A home station was established at Yering and two outstations established on the northern side of the Yarra River, at Tarrawarra and Dalry. (Note: Dalry was later developed as a vineyard by Hubert de Castella, an elder brother of Paul de Castella.) In August 1838 the Ryries, with the help of Swiss vigneron, James Dardel, planted a four-thousand-square-metre (one-acre) vineyard, and are thought to have produced the first wine made in the Colony. (Note: Although, this claim is unclear.)

=== Vineyard ===
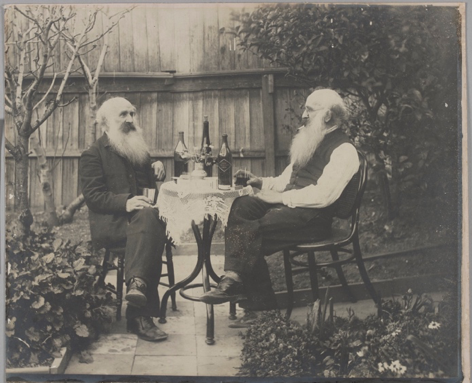
Chateau Yering wine, 1895

In 1850 Donald Ryrie sold the property and a seven-room pre-fabricated house to Paul de Castella, who had arrived in the Port Phillip District from Neuchatel, Switzerland in 1849. From 1852, de Castella and his brother, Hubert, were assisted with the management of the cattle station by Samuel de Pury and his brother, Guillaume. In 1859, the de Castella brothers imported cellar equipment and ten thousand vines, half of which were Sauvignon and two thousand La Folle (the grape used for making the best Cognac), the latter of which were all failures. Additions were subsequently made to the homestead as the property developed from grazing to wine-making, with the assistance of the de Pury brothers. In 1889, Paul de Castella won a Grand Pix for his wine at Paris Exhibition.

Chateau Yering developed as one of the most successful 19th-century Victorian vineyards, receiving local and international recognition for its table wines. For most of the 19th century, Yering was the largest vineyard in the Yarra Valley and played a significant role in viticulture in the district until the end of the century. Hubert de Castella's vineyard, St. Hubert's, also developed into a leading winery.

=== Homestead ===
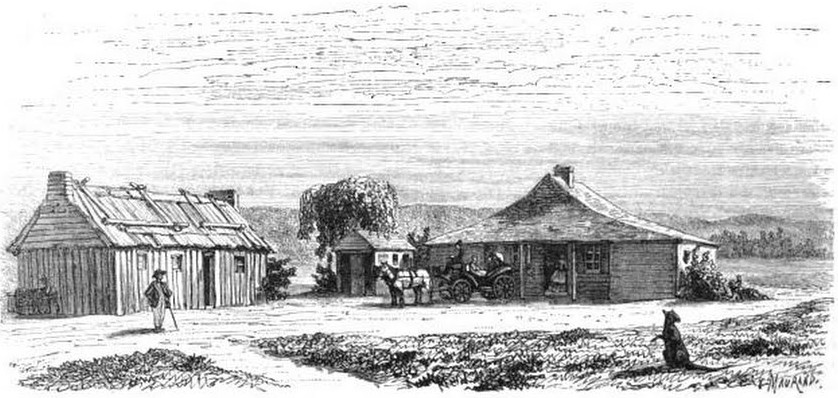
An 1861 etching of the homestead by Karl Girardet, published in Le Tour du Monde

Paul de Castella lived in Ryrie's pre-fabricated house until the grand Victorian Georgian homestead was constructed in 1854, using hand-made bricks and expensive fittings such as the marble fire surrounds and cedar timbers brought by bullock cart from Melbourne. The central section of the homestead, including the verandah and porte cochere, was constructed and the interior renovated. The homestead comprised a library, reading room, dining room, and formal lounge, and bedrooms and other facilities. The gardens surrounding the homestead were laid out by Paul de Castella, with the assistance of Baron Ferdinand von Mueller, the inaugural director of the Royal Botanic Gardens, Melbourne.

A description of the property was published in the Australian Vigneron in 1899:

"We recently had the pleasure of visiting the Chateau Yering Estate, at Yarra Glen. This vineyard which is one of the oldest in the colony, originally belonged to Mr Paul de Castella, who has been connected with the wine industry in Victoria for so many years. The view obtained from the Chateau would be difficult to surpass in any country: the surrounding hills are covered with native forest trees, and the course of the (Yarra) river is easily followed by observing the rows of wattle growing on the banks. The Chateau is a substantial building, surrounded by a 5-metre (15 ft) verandah. On entering one is struck by the loftiness of the rooms, and the handsome fittings and decorations which equal those to be found in an old English home. The Chateau is approached by an avenue of elm trees over half a mile long. Mr de Castella was noted for his hospitality, and most of the Governors and visitors of note in the early days have been royally entertained there."

— Australian Vigneron, 1899.

The importance of the complex is enhanced by its proximity to the remains of other 19th-century pastoral properties in the Yarra Glen district including the McPherson homestead and Gulf Station, and by its continuing association with pastoral and wine-making activities until the present day. The complex is also associated with the beginning of Victoria's wine industry, producing the first wine in the Colony, vines having been planted on the property in the late 1830s.

==== Ownership since the 1940s ====
The Sullivan family owned the property from the 1940s and, in 1996, sold the vineyard and winery to the Rathbone family – trading as 'Yering Station' – and the homestead to Len and Elly Milner. The Milners developed the Chateau Yering homestead into a luxury hotel, wedding venue, and conference centre. The redevelopment featured 32 individually-styled suites, many of which feature private balconies or verandahs overlooking the gardens and the surrounding countryside. The property was purchased in 2018 by William Wei for c.A$14 million; and a year later, the property was acquired by Chinese architect Max Zhang, who made further improvements including an outdoor pool and tennis court. Zhang listed the estate for sale in 2022 with expectations of $20 million. The property was acquired in December 2022 by the ASX-listed Elanor Investor Group for an undisclosed price.

== Description ==
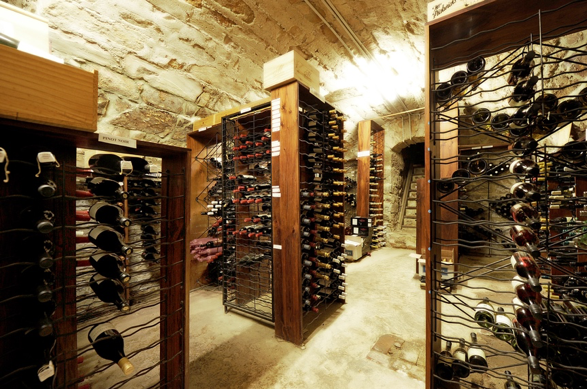
The cellar, 2019

The Yering homestead is an unusually planned domestic dwelling which demonstrates a changing sequence of occupation over since the 1850s. It is an important and rare example of a complex of farm buildings in the Yarra Glen district, demonstrating several phases of development from the original pastoral property and vineyard dating from the late 1830s, through the development of the cattle station and winery to become one of the Yarra Valley's largest and most famous wineries. The complex is enhanced by its good condition and demonstrates an integrity that is uncommon for such early properties in the region.

The site comprises a homestead complex, beneath an overlay of alterations and additions, with a fairly intact southern plan form, some original walls, doors and joinery, partially intact detached kitchen and some original fire surrounds. The brick winery building essentially retains its original form, although there have been some alterations and additions. The brick stables in their linear plan form, (now converted into flats), remain with a two-storey stable section and an upper level hay loft; the southern single-storey section appears to have contained various workshops and stalls. The corrugated iron clad 'milking' shed retains its original plan form and is a rectangular structure with central nave and two side sections.

== See also ==
- Architecture of Melbourne
- List of places on the Victorian Heritage Register in the Shire of Yarra Ranges
- Victorian wine
- Yarra Valley wine region
