= Armand Niquille =

Swiss painter

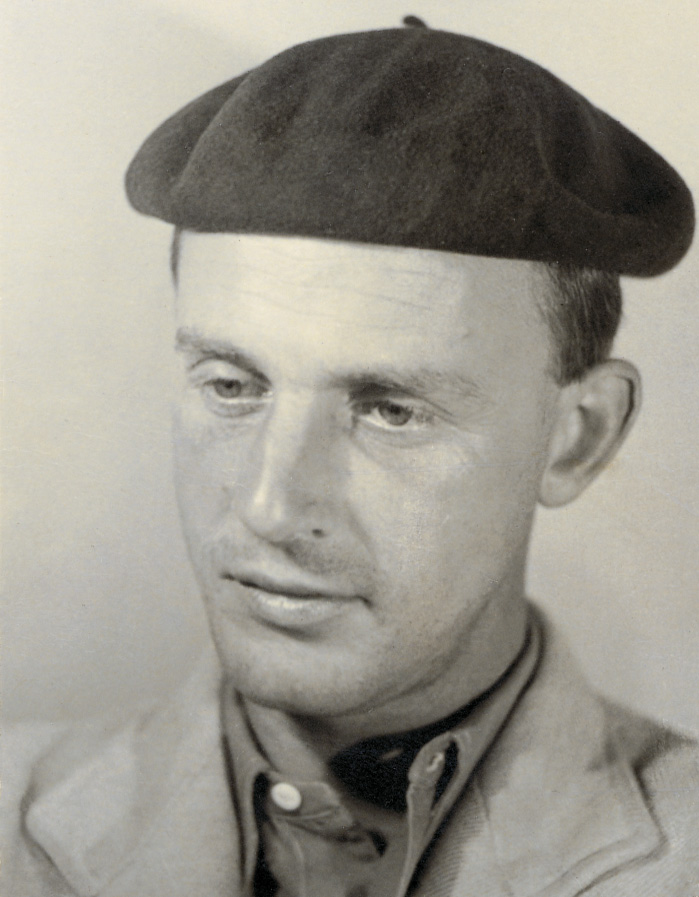
- Armand Niquille
- Born: Armand Marius Niquille; 30 March 1912; Fribourg, Switzerland
- Died: 17 December 1996 (aged 84); Fribourg, Switzerland
- Known for: Painting, drawing, oil painting

Armand Niquille (born 30 March 1912 – died 17 December 1996 in Fribourg, Switzerland) was a Swiss artist.

== Biography ==
Armand Marius Niquille, whose civil origin is Charmey, Switzerland, is the son of Césarine Niquille, née Barbey, married Auguste. The mystery surrounding Niquille's illegitimate birth seems to have had a profound effect on his artistic creation.

He began his artistic training in 1927 at the Technicum (State technical college) in Fribourg. From 1940 on he regularly restored art works for the Musée d’art et d’histoire de Fribourg. From 1947 to 1977 he taught drawing at Collège Saint-Michel, also in Fribourg.

On 28 March 1949 he married Simone Bluette Amey, (b. 18 March 1916 in La Sagne, Switzerland – d. 31 December 2001 in Fribourg), daughter of Marcel Amey and Rosa Tissot. A gold leaf gilding specialist, Simone produced frames for Niquille's paintings.

In spite of his discreet and humble character (some paintings are signed Nihil, ‘nothing’), Armand Niquille was honored by several retrospective exhibitions held in Canton Fribourg during his lifetime. A number of publications by contemporary authors contribute to his reputation.

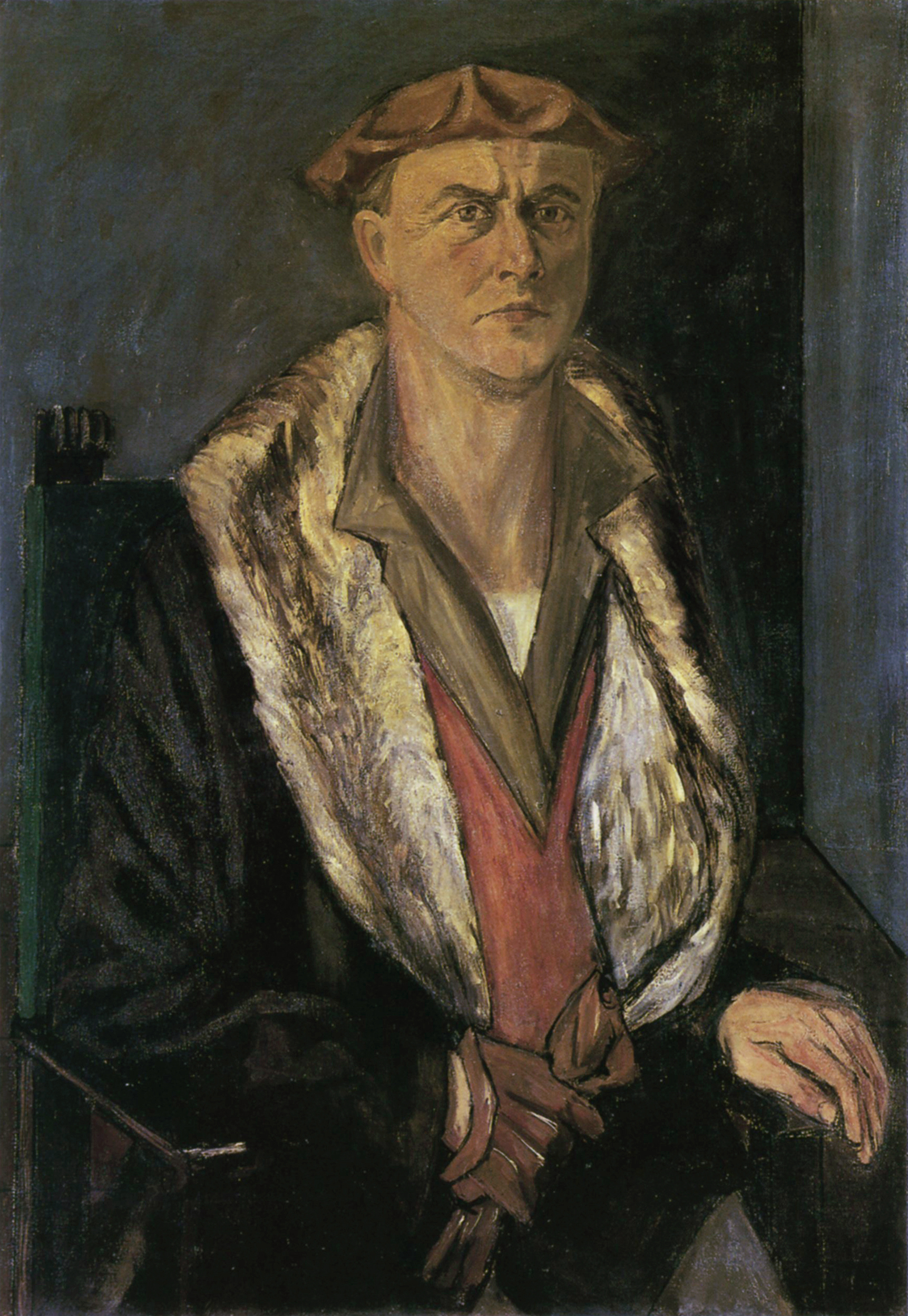
Armand Niquille The Man with the Gloves, Self-portrait, oil on canvas, 1954, 116x81 cm, MAHF

== Artistic training ==
From 1927 to 1931 he attended courses at the Technicum (technical college) in Fribourg, in the department for decorative arts. His teachers were the artists Hiram Brülhart, Oscar Cattani, Henri Robert and Oswald Pilloud. He learned the techniques of oil and tempera painting and practiced easel painting. Niquille complemented his artistic training by restoring art works in collaboration with his wife, an activity that made him familiar with the region's artistic patrimony. ‘By giving to earlier works their original vibrancy, Niquille uncovered the painters’ secrets, his own works were enriched in the process (…) Thus the painter regularly visited the imaginary studios of Fribourg masters (…).’

During World War II Niquille met artists taking refuge in Switzerland, among whom was Balthus. These artists encouraged him to persevere in his artistic career. "I am honoured to have been his friend, and he influenced me sufficiently that I avoid the trendy spring styles that appear every year in the hollow of big cities." After the war, trips to France, Spain and Italy completed his aesthetic education and reinforced his appreciation of the Old Masters.

== Pictorial work ==
"I am a daytime realist, and a nocturnal surrealist with an impressionist base". From 1929 until his death the same preoccupation ran through Niquille's artistic creation, ‘a double path’ which lead critics to study his work by subjects rather than by periods.

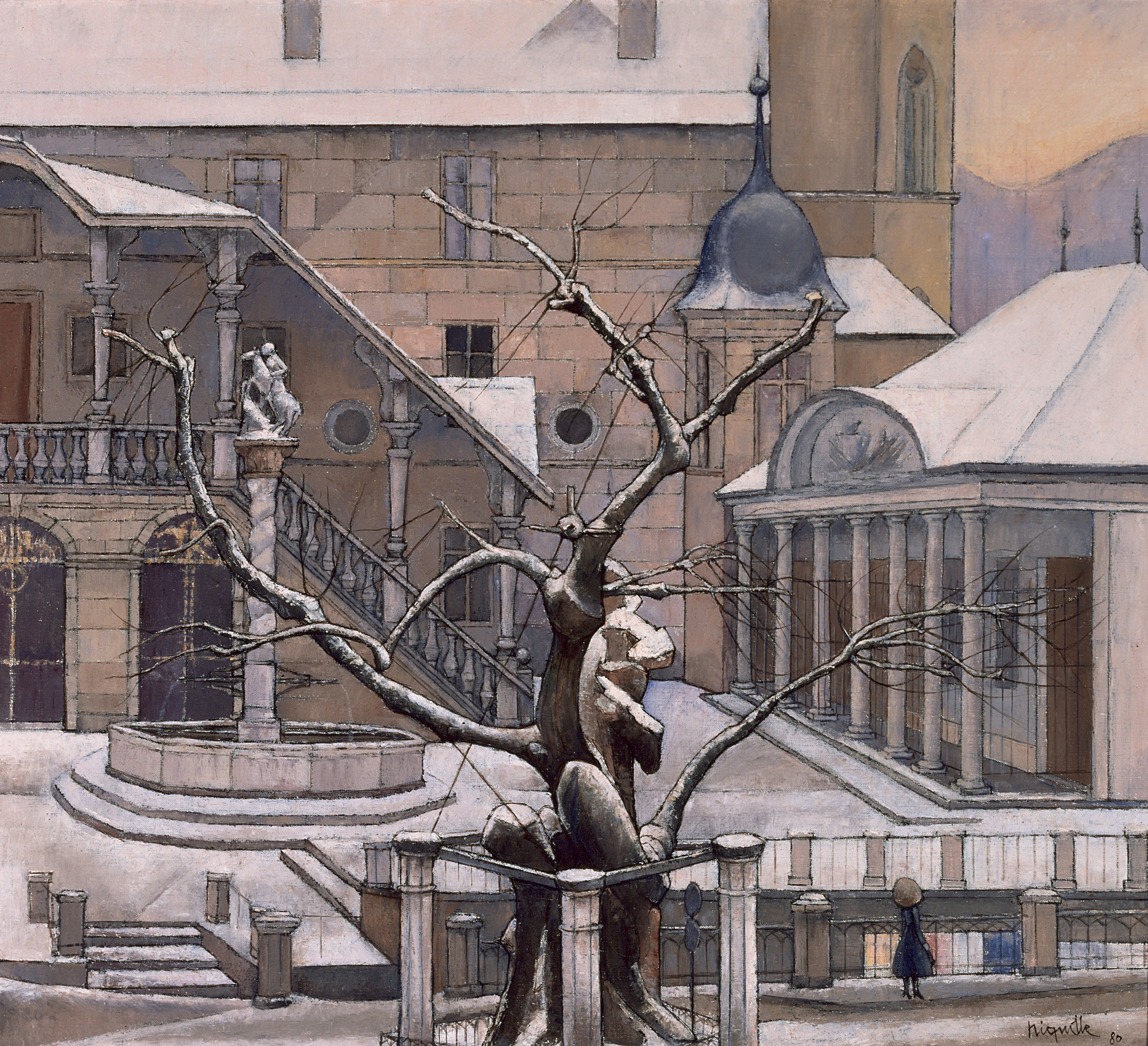
Armand Niquille, The Linden Tree and the City Hall Square, 1980, oil on canvas, 87x90 cm, PP

Daytime paintings depict daily reality, namely landscapes, in particular views of Fribourg. These representations of the city, lyrical and colourful in his early paintings, take in later works a decluttered aspect tending toward fantasticism and searching for a geometric absolute which reveals the contrasts between old and modern, between natural and built areas within the city.

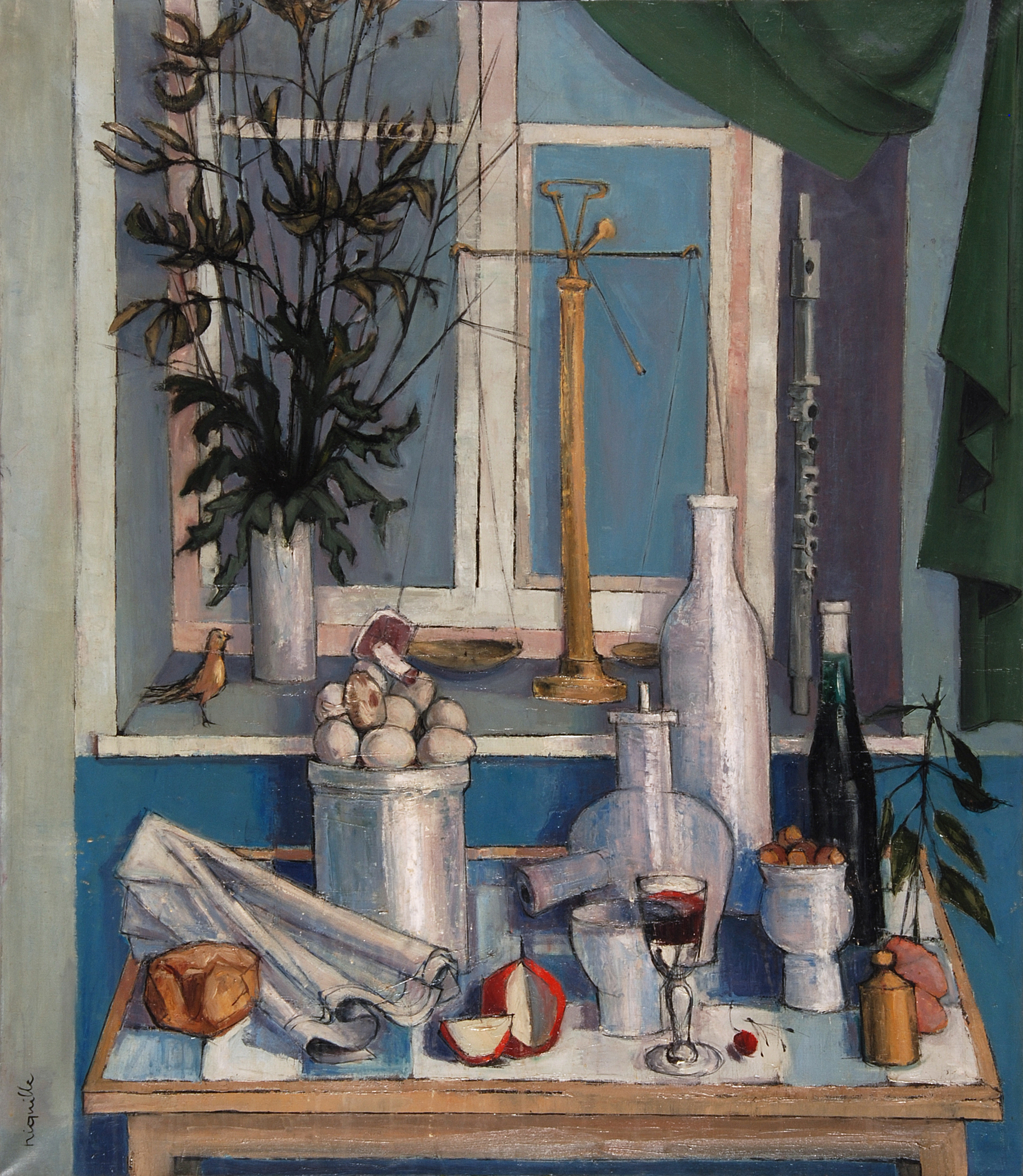
Armand Niquille, Still life with Scales, n.d., oil on canvas, 100x86 cm, PP

The other path of Niquille's pictorial creation, nocturnal paintings, depict mystical allegories, personal reflection on the mysteries of Faith, occasionally inspired by Christian literature. These canvases approach abstraction and often have commentaries by the painter written on their back, which are part of the works themselves. Along with these two categories are portraits and self-portraits, as well as some 75 still lifes. The latter have an intermediary status: halfway between daytime and nocturnal painting. In them the artist seeks to ‘invoke(...)the mystery of the sacred.’

Being an admirer of the art of the Middle Ages and the Renaissance, Armand Niquille used old painting techniques such as tempera. He also attached a particular importance to the laws of composition and to the rigorous organization of space, using the traditional mise au carré, a method learned at the Technicum. A member of the Society of Swiss Painters, Sculptors and Architects (SPSAS, now Visarte), he regularly participated in collective exhibitions of this group. Even though Niquille distanced himself from twentieth-century artistic movements, his pictorial creation nevertheless bears witness to modernity.

== Applied Arts ==
- 1954 Stations of the Cross for the church of Nuvilly (Canton of Fribourg, Switzerland)
- 1955 Stations of the Cross for the church of Christ-Roi (Canton of Fribourg, Switzerland) at the request of the architect Denis Honegger
- 1966 Stained-glass window for the church of Sévaz (Canton of Fribourg), two stained-glass windows for the Belluard secondary school (Canton of Fribourg)
- 1948-1951 Various theatre settings for the Collège Saint-Michel

== Literary work ==
Armand Niquille : Le veilleur de solitude, poèmes, Éditions de la Sarine, 1992.

== Exhibitions ==
- 2015 Armand Niquille, de Fribourg à Charmey, Musée de Charmey
- 2012 Armand Niquille, Espace du Rural, Givisiez
- 2006 Armand Niquille, œuvres profanes, Château de Boccard, Givisiez
- 2006 Oeuvres religieuses, Chapelle de l’Hôpital des Bourgeois, Fribourg
- 2006 Une œuvre, un destin, Bibliothèque cantonale et universitaire, Fribourg
- 1996 Niquille. Réalités et images de la foi. Gruyères Castle
- 1992 Niquille. Le centre et l'harmonie. Musée d'art et d'histoire de Fribourg
- 1989 Armand Niquille. Images, actes de foi, symboles et réalités. Ancienne Douane (actual Gutenberg Museum), Fribourg
- 1981 Exposition personnelle, Galerie de la Cathédrale, Fribourg
- 1976 Niquille. Peinture nocturne. Musée d'art et d'histoire de Fribourg
- 1966 Armand Niquille, Musée d'art et d'histoire de Fribourg
- 1947 Armand Niquille, peintre, Antoine Claraz, sculpteur, Musée d'art et d'histoire (then at the Miséricorde University), Fribourg
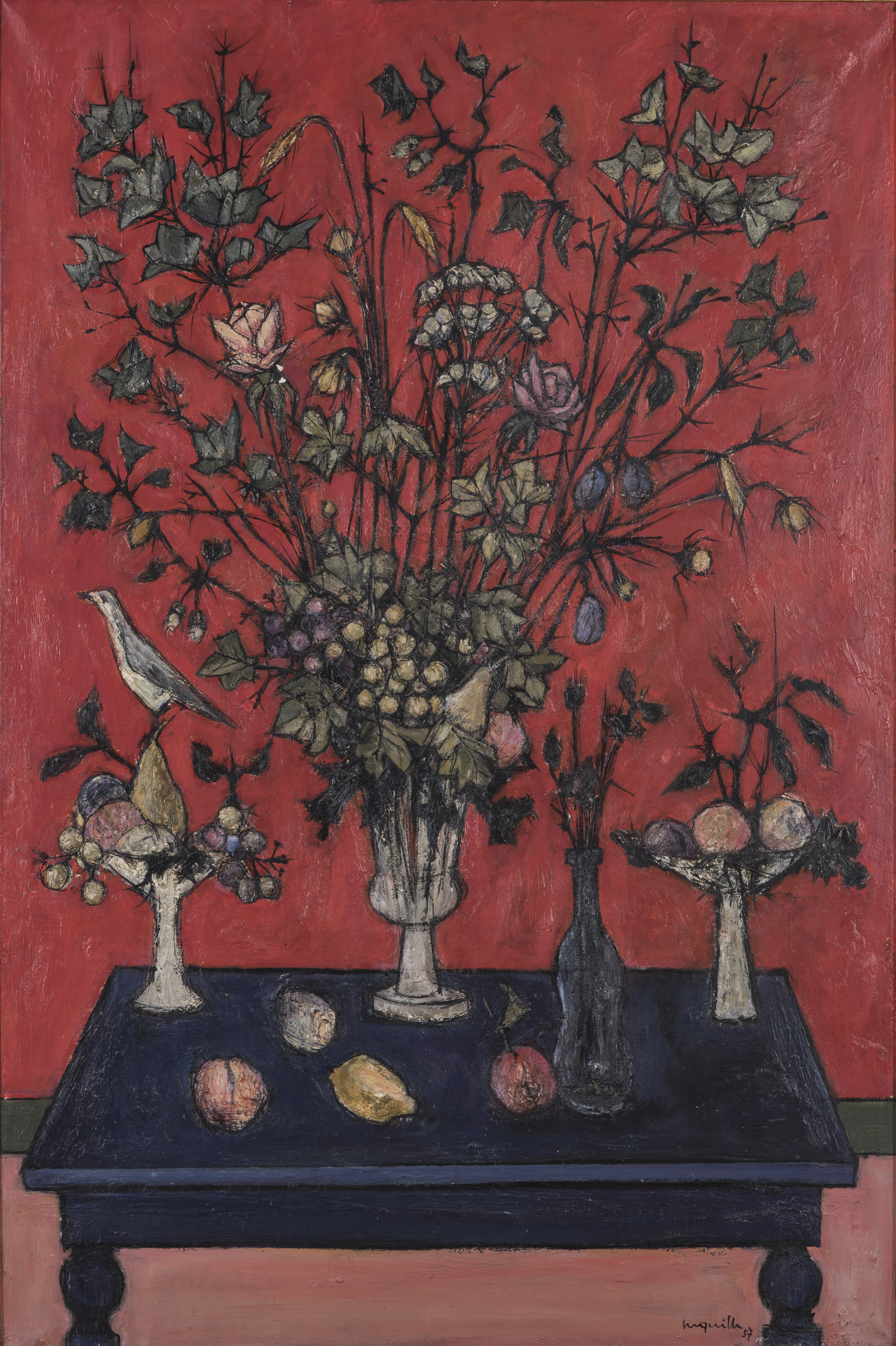
Armand Niquille, Red Bouquet on Red Background, 1957, 122x81 cm, FAN

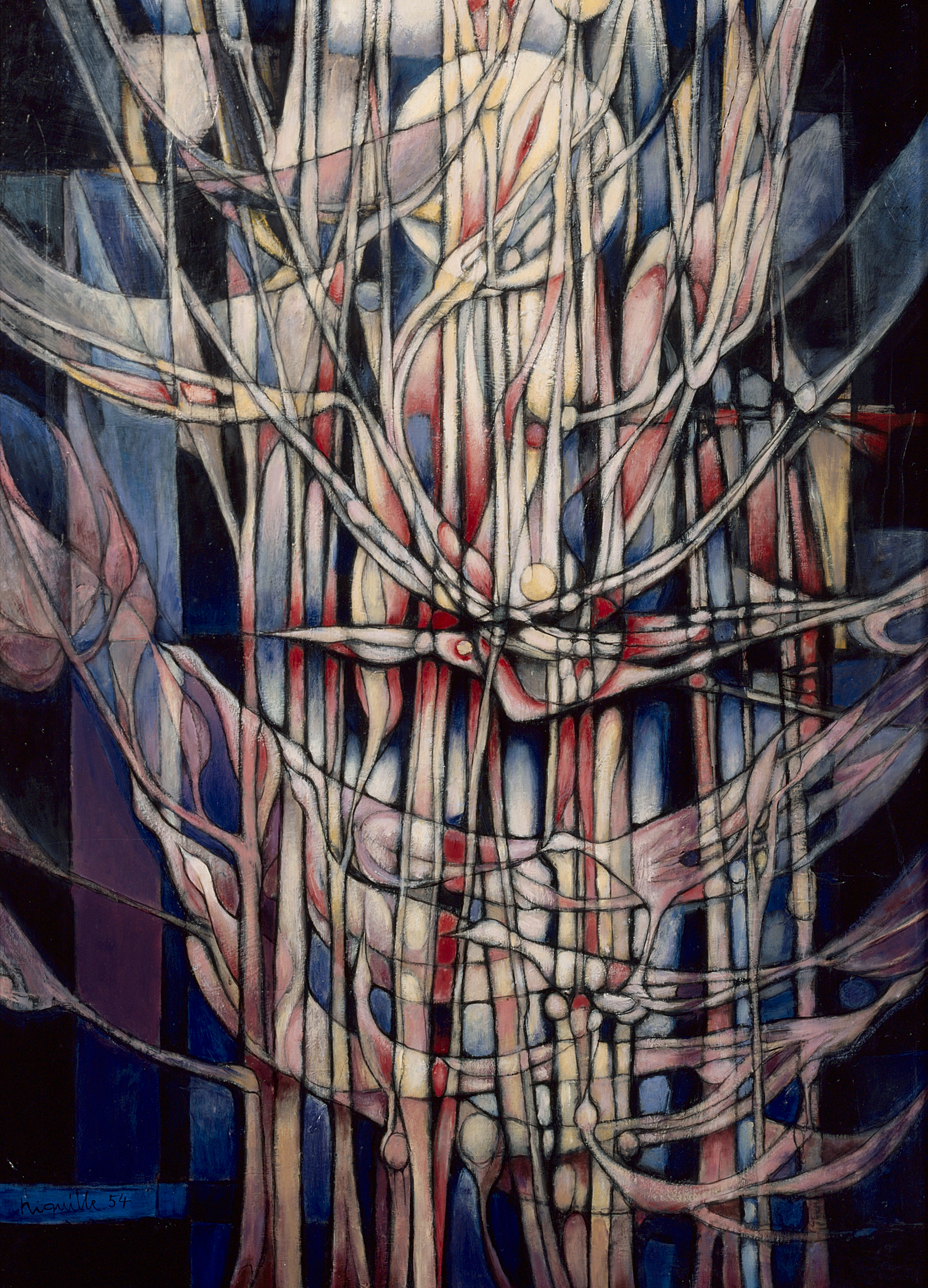
Armand Niquille, Birds, Branches and Reflects in the Water on a Spring Night, 1954, 110x80 cm, FAN

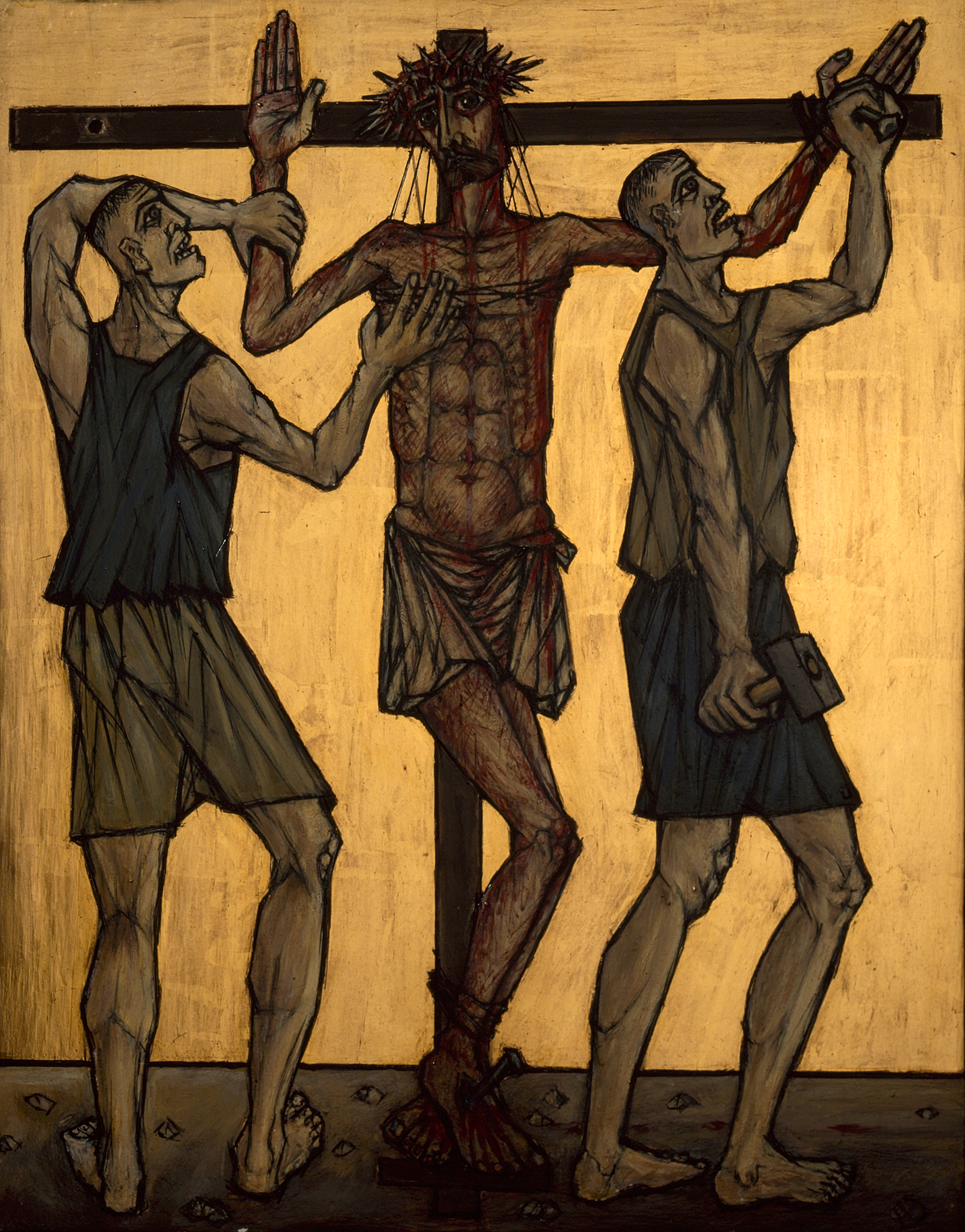
Armand Niquille, Way of the Cross, Station XXI Church of the Christ-Roi, 1955, 46x36 cm

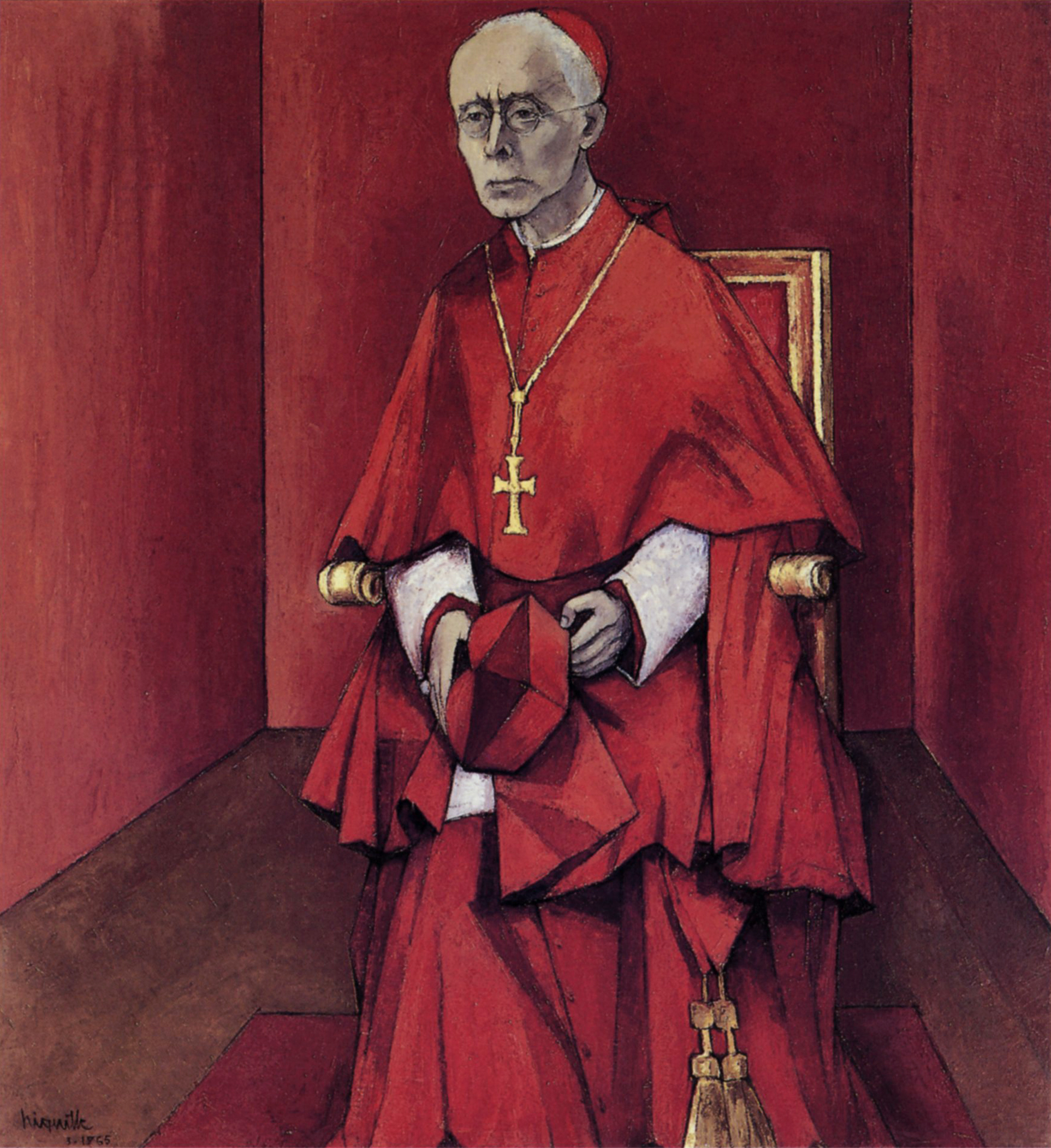
Armand Niquille, The Cardinal, 1965, 97x89 cm, Fondation Cardinal Journet

== The Armand-Niquille Esplanade ==
On 24 September 2022, in the presence of the authorities of the City and State of Fribourg, the Esplanade Armand-Niquille was inaugurated. The many people present at this event viewed the bronze commemorative plaque that the foundation commissioned from the artist Marc Monteleone, an admirer and great connoisseur of Niquille's work. It shows a portrait of Armand Niquille, inspired by one of his self-portraits painted in 1954, and a quotation from the artist, taken from his book "Le veilleur de solitude". A nameplate donated by the City of Fribourg also marks the location of the Esplanade Armand-Niquille, on the low wall overlooking the Bourg, at the top of the Escaliers du Collège and next to the courtyard of the Collège Saint-Michel.

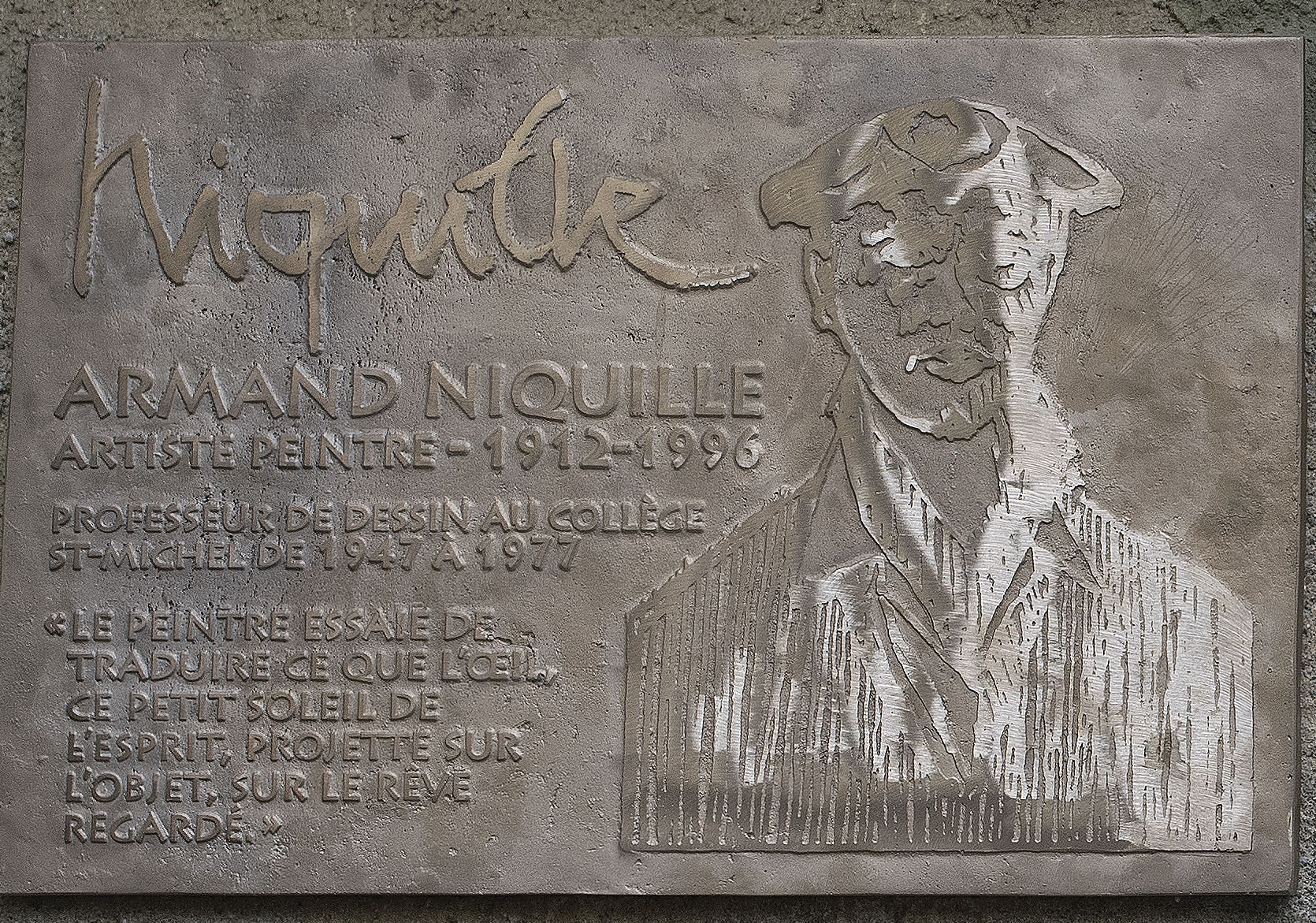
Commemorative plaque of the painter Armand Niquille

== Bibliography ==
- 2015 Armand Niquille, de Fribourg à Charmey, Musée de Charmey
- 2012 Armand Niquille, Espace du Rural, Givisiez
- 2006 Armand Niquille, œuvres profanes, Château de Boccard, Givisiez
- 2006 Oeuvres religieuses, Chapelle de l’Hôpital des Bourgeois, Fribourg
- 2006 Une œuvre, un destin, Bibliothèque cantonale et universitaire, Fribourg
- 1996 Niquille. Réalités et images de la foi. Gruyères Castle
- 1992 Niquille. Le centre et l'harmonie. Musée d'art et d'histoire de Fribourg
- 1989 Armand Niquille. Images, actes de foi, symboles et réalités. Ancienne Douane (actual Gutenberg Museum), Fribourg
- 1981 Exposition personnelle, Galerie de la Cathédrale, Fribourg
- 1976 Niquille. Peinture nocturne. Musée d'art et d'histoire de Fribourg
- 1966 Armand Niquille, Musée d'art et d'histoire de Fribourg
- 1947 Armand Niquille, peintre, Antoine Claraz, sculpteur, Musée d'art et d'histoire (then at the University Miséricorde), Fribourg
