= Oswald Pilloud =

Swiss artist (1873–1946)

- Born: 27 July 1873; Châtel-Saint-Denis, Switzerland
- Died: 6 July 1946 (aged 72); Fribourg, Switzerland
- Known for: Painting

Ignace Nazaire Oswald Pilloud (27 July 1873 – 6 July 1946) was a Swiss painter and illustrator.

== Biography ==
Born in Châtel-Saint-Denis in 1873, Pilloud attended Ferdinand Hodler's classes in Fribourg from 1896 to 1899 where he studied together with Raymond Buchs, Hiram Brülhart and Jean-Edouard de Castella. Encouraged by Hodler to pursue his career as a painter, he travelled to Paris where he studied at the Académie de la Grande Chaumière, as well as the Académie Colarossi, and was influenced by les Nabis.

Having returned to Switzerland in 1905 he worked as a drawing teacher at the Technicum in Fribourg and had in particular Armand Niquille amongst his students. Two years later he joined the Fribourg section of the Swiss Society of Painters, Sculptors and Architects. Even if he painted a few still lifes and portraits, Oswald Pilloud remains famous for his landscapes inspired by Ferdinand Hodler.

Pilloud died in 1946 in Fribourg.

== Works in public institutions ==
- Alpes fribourgeoises, vers 1917. Musée gruérien, Bulle
- La Veveyse, s.d.. Musée d’Art et d’Histoire, Fribourg
