= Museum of Art and History =

Museum of Art and History may refer to:

- Musée d'art et d'histoire de Saint-Denis, Saint-Denis, France
- Musée d'art et d'Histoire (Fribourg), Switzerland
- Musée d'Art et d'Histoire (Geneva), Switzerland
- Musée d'Art et d'Histoire du Judaïsme, Paris, France
- Museum für Kunst und Kulturgeschichte, Dortmund, Germany
- Royal Museums of Art and History, Brussels, Belgium
  - Art & History Museum, Brussels, Belgium
- Santa Cruz Museum of Art and History, California, United States
- Westphalian State Museum of Art and Cultural History, Münster, Germany
