= Antoine Claraz =

Swiss sculptor and teacher (1909–1997)

Antoine Claraz (8 September 1909, in Fribourg – 2 June 1997, in Fribourg), was a Swiss painter, sculptor and art teacher.

A selection of his work was exhibited in Musée d'art et d'histoire, Fribourg in 2000.

== Works ==
- Equestrian statue of Berthold IV, Duke of Zähringen, 1965, at Fribourg.
