= Yarra Valley wine region =

Australian wine region

Coordinates: 37°46′S 145°37′E

Yarra Valley
- Wine region
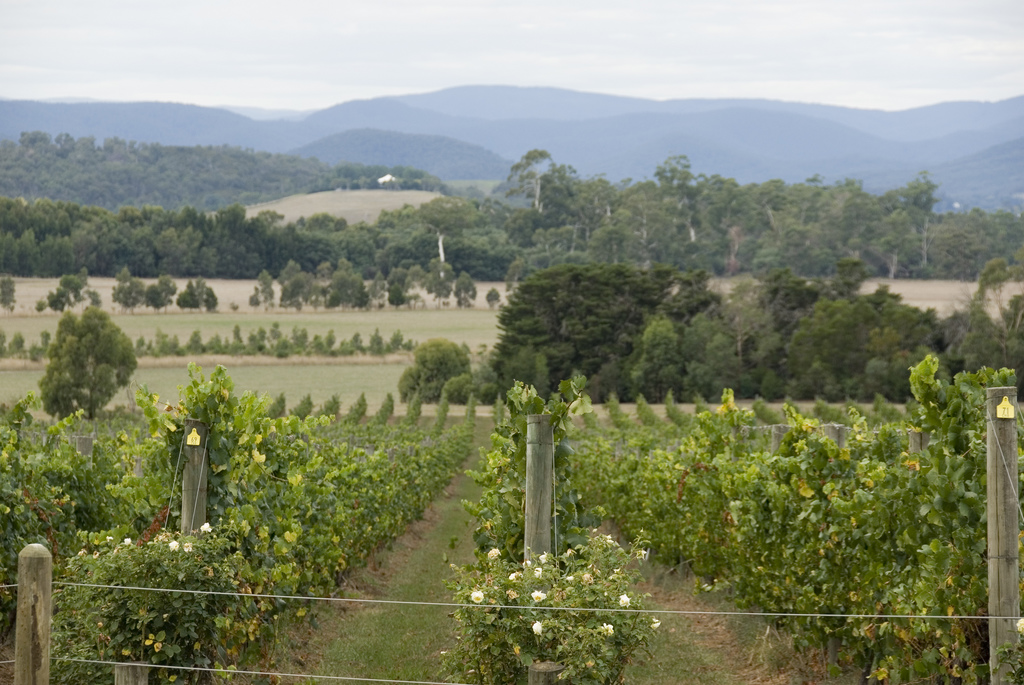
- Type: Wine region
- Country: Australia
- Climate region: Continental/Alpine
- Size of planted vineyards: 6,157 acres (24.92 km^{2})
- No. of vineyards: 200
- Grapes produced: Pinot Noir; Chardonnay; Cabernet Sauvignon; Syrah (aka Shiraz); Pinot Gris; Grenache; Merlot; Sangiovese; Sauvignon Blanc; Nebbiolo; Gamay; Pinot Blanc; Touriga Nacional; Tempranillo; Riesling
- No. of wineries: 160

The Yarra Valley is an Australian wine region located east of Melbourne, Victoria. It is a cool climate region that is best known for producing Chardonnay, sparkling wine and Pinot Noir. Its proximity to the urban centre and high profile wineries have made it an important destination for enotourism, receiving over 3.1 million visitors in 2011.

== Geography and climate ==
The westernmost point of the Yarra Valley is Whittlesea, north to Kinglake, east to Mount Gregory and south to Gembrook. It is divided into two distinct subregions, the Valley Floor and the Upper Yarra, with distinct altitudes, soils, rainfall and climates between them. Rainfall in the Yarra Valley is typically between 750mm - 950mm.

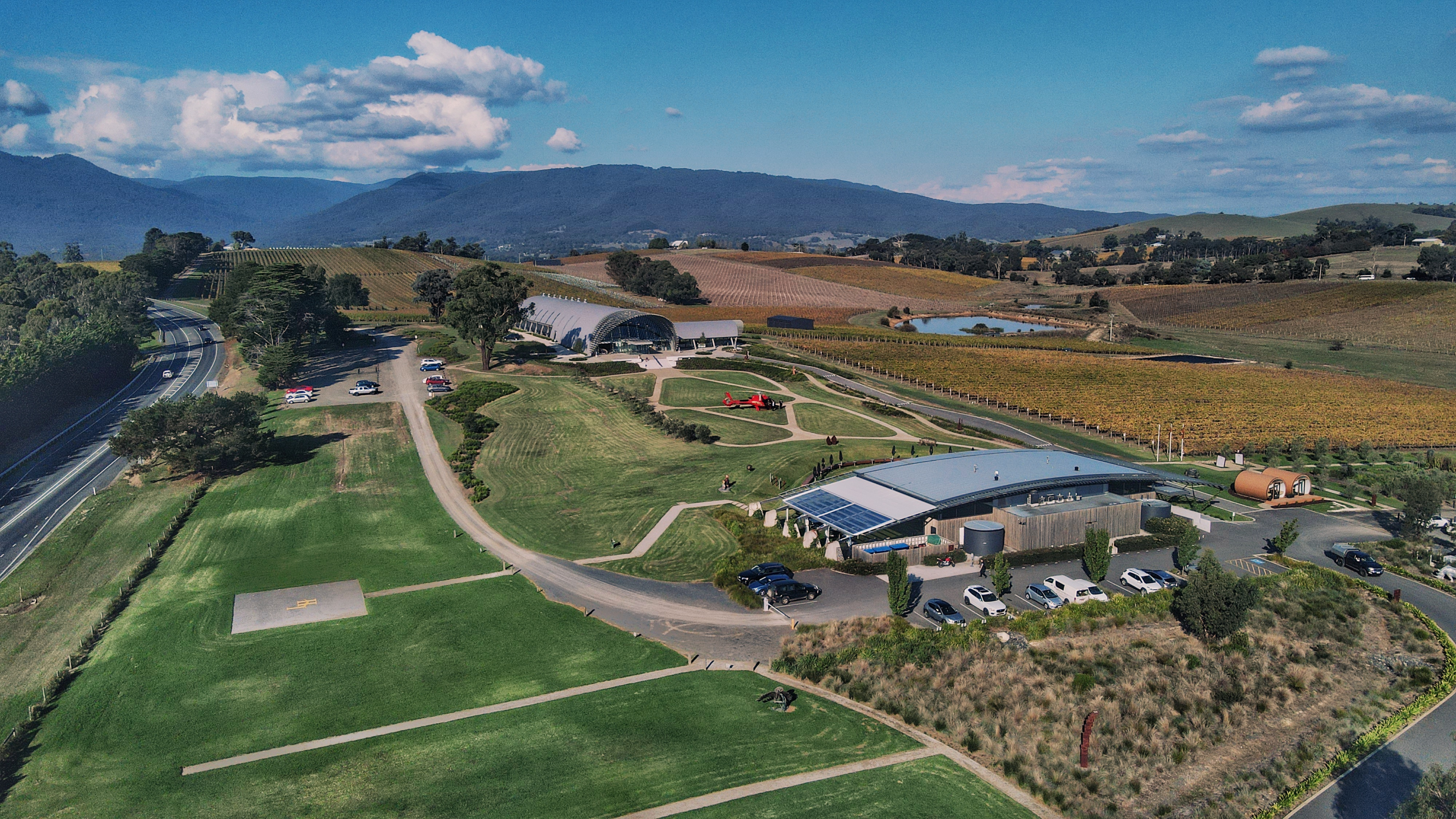
Levantine Hill estate from above. Shot on 230422

=== Valley Floor ===
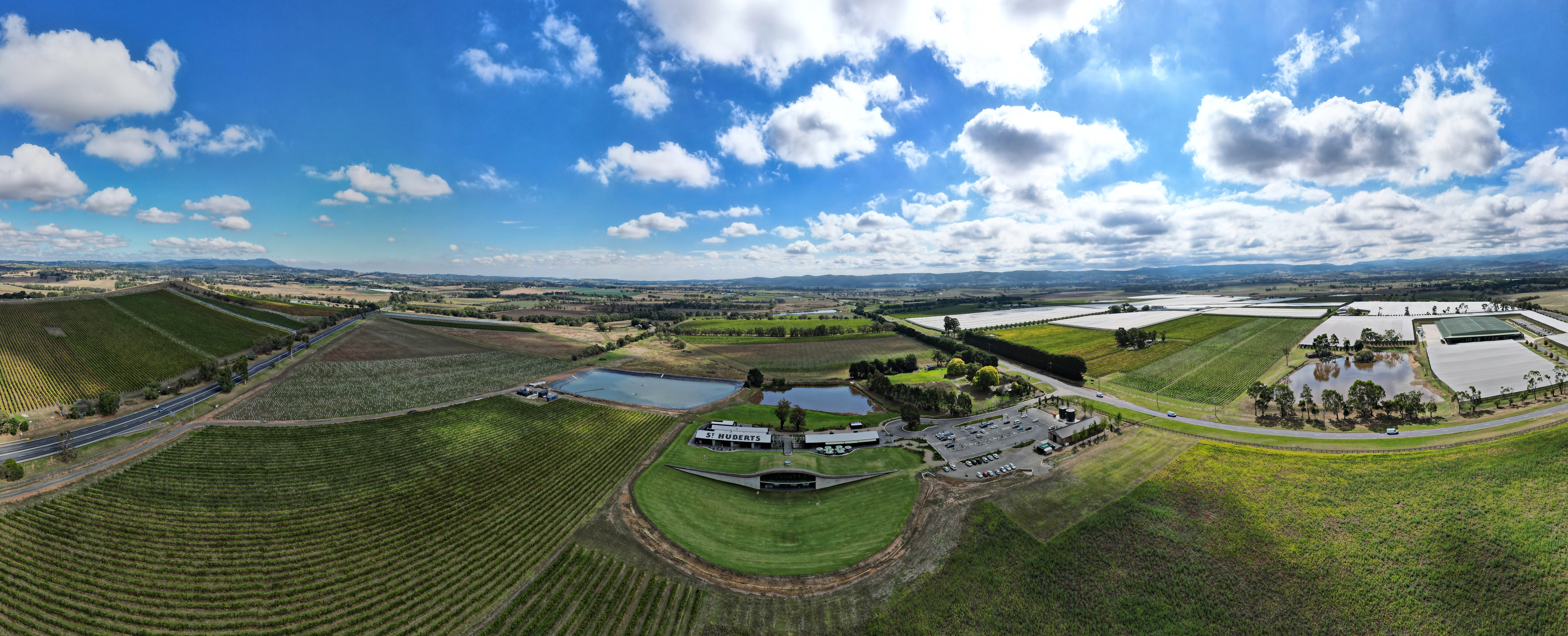
Aerial panorama of Coldstream with the St Hubert Vineyard in the middle of the frame. March 2023.

The valley floor includes the towns of Lilydale, Yarra Glen and Healesville, and is the path of both the Melba Highway and the Maroondah Highway. Most of the subregion sits between 50 and 80 metres above sea level and its gently sloping hills are warmer on average than other parts of the area. The area is predominantly grey soils, with pockets of granite around Yarra Glen and limestone near Kangaroo Ground and Lilydale.

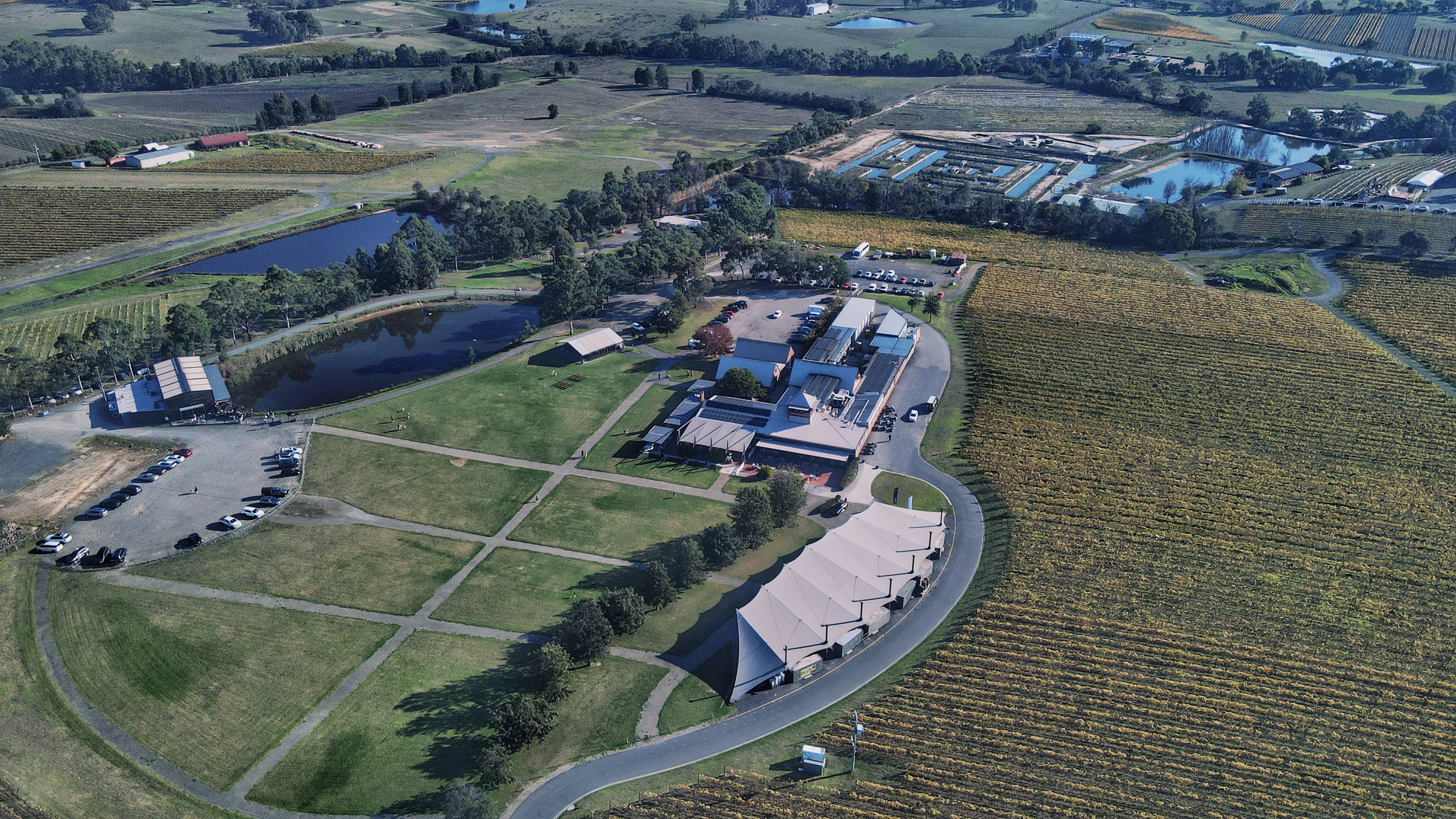
Rochford Wines Yarra Valley from above. Shot on 230422.

=== Upper Yarra ===
The Upper Yarra extends across most of the southern side of the valley and includes the towns of Seville, Warburton and Hoddles Creek. The younger, fertile red soils of this subregion coupled with a cooler climate owing to its increased elevation (up to around 400 metres) and south-westerly winds after March, produce the area's most notable varietals, Chardonnay and Pinot Noir.

== History ==
=== Yering ===
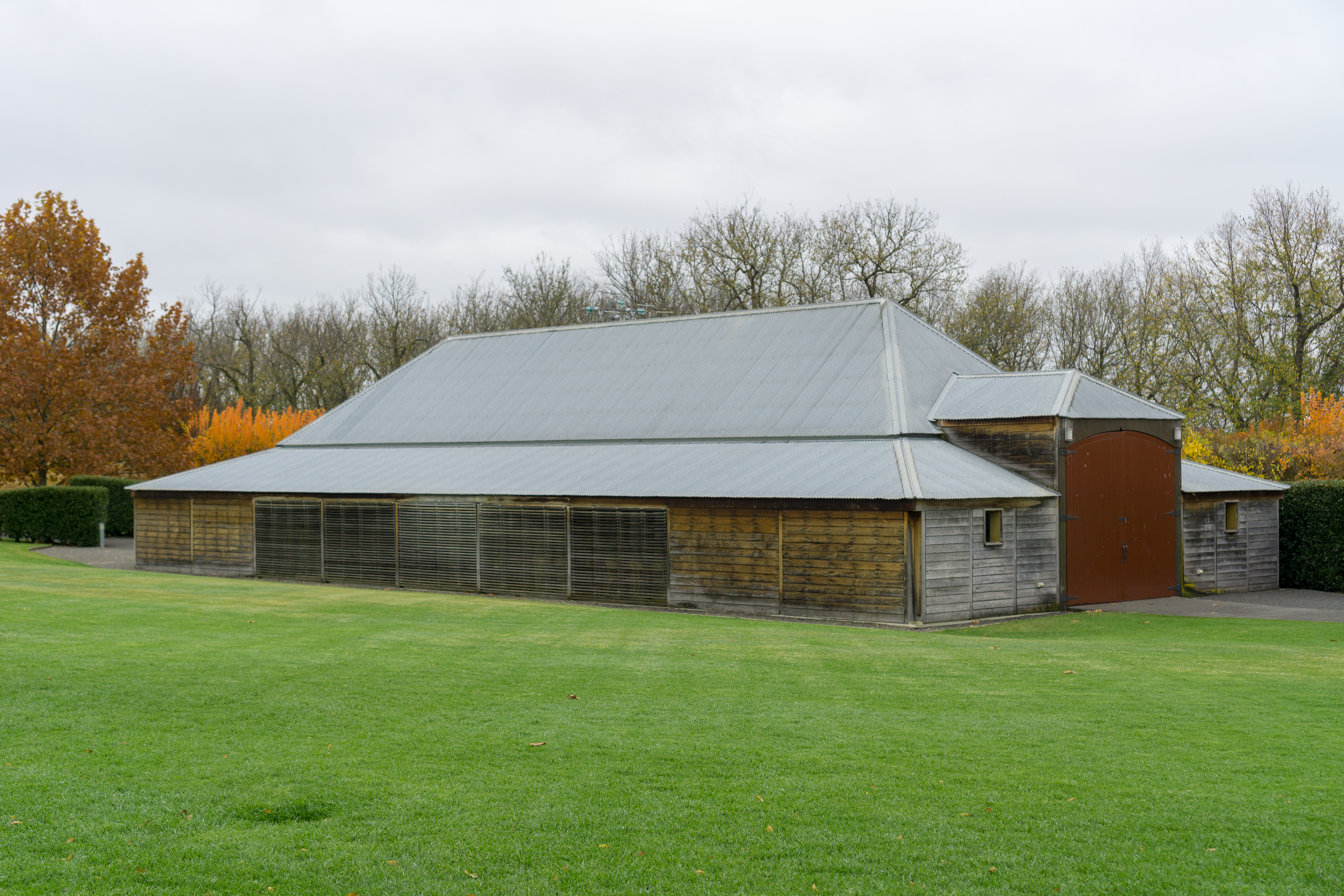
Historic barn at Yering Station

The Yarra Valley was Victoria's first planted wine region, beginning with a vineyard at Yering Station in 1838. The Ryrie brothers, moving their cattle south from Sydney, took up a grazing license of 43,000 acres and planted two varietals, the Black Cluster of Hamburg and Sweetwater. The property was taken over by Swiss-born Paul de Castella in 1850 and developed into a major wine centre for the region, its increasing profile recognised in 1861 when it won the Argus Gold Cup for best Victorian vineyard. In 1863, Hubert de Castella established St Huberts Winery and Frédéric Guillaume de Pury founded Yeringberg, increasing the area under vine to 430 acres. In 1889 Yering Station won the grand prix at the Exposition Universelle, the only time a winery in the southern hemisphere has ever done so. Although profile and plantings had grown considerably by the turn of the century, economic decline, the threat of phylloxera and changing palatal preference impacted on cool climate viticulture and by 1937 the region was entirely converted to dairy farming.

=== Wantirna and Warramate ===
In 1963, Reg Egan founded Wantirna Estate, the first of the most recent generation of Yarra Valley wineries, with plantings of varieties largely unknown in Australia, including Crouchon, Pedro Ximinez and Dolcetto. 12 hectares of vines were then planted in 1969 by the botanist Dr. Bailey Carrodus in the foot of the Warramate Hills, signalling the founding of Yarra Yering and the rekindling of interest in the region as a wine district. In 1985 prominent Australian wine critic James Halliday founded Coldstream Hills, and in the following year French Champagne house Moët & Chandon opened a local base at Domaine Chandon.

=== Black Saturday ===
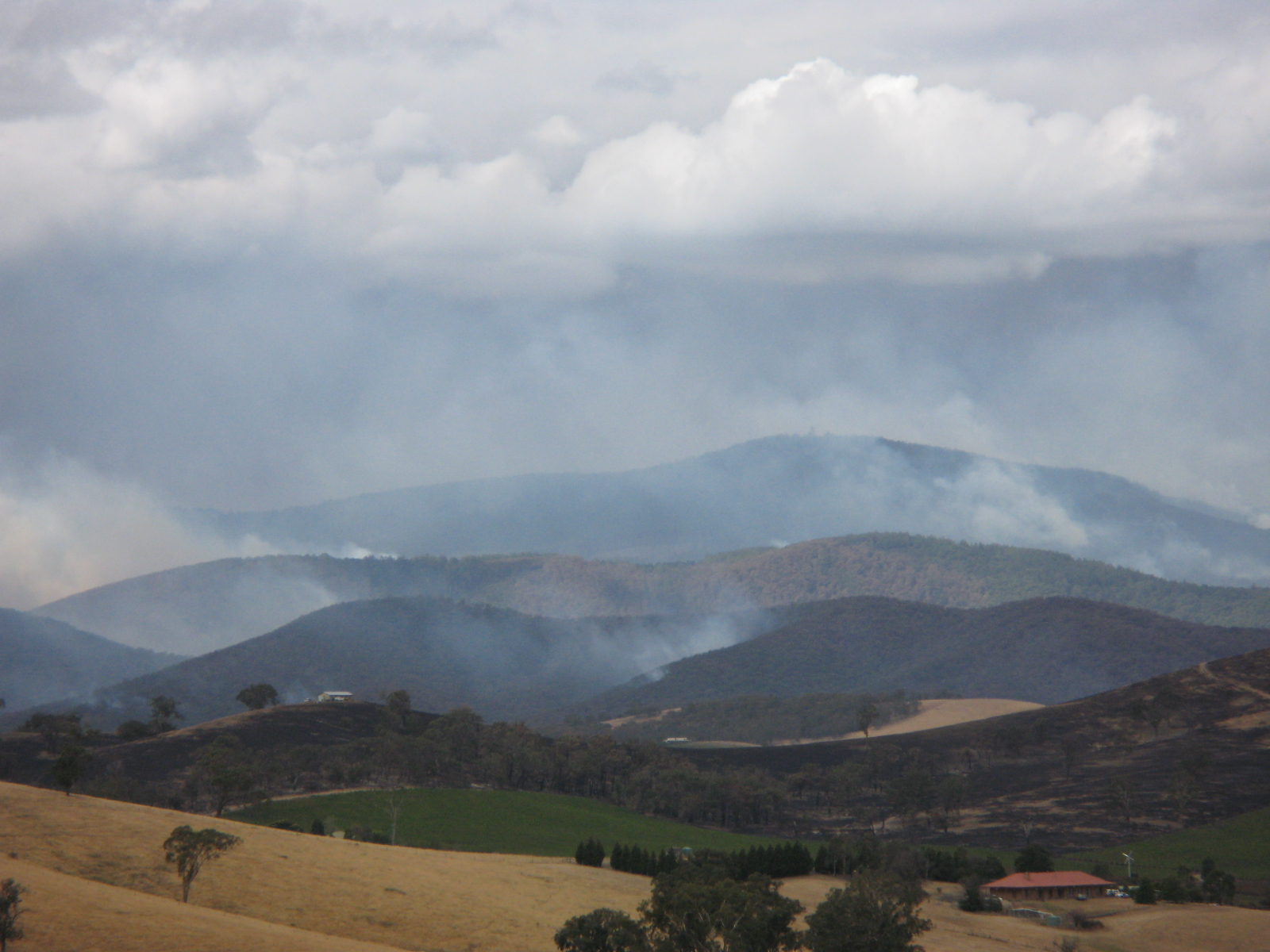
Part of the Maroondah/Yarra complex, east of Yarra Glen, on 10 February 2009

The Black Saturday bushfires were a series of fires that burnt large areas of rural Victoria on and around 7 February 2009, resulting in the death of 173 people. The wine region was threatened by three of the major fire complexes - Kinglake/Marysville, Dandenong Ranges & Maroondah/Yarra - and townships of Yarra Glen, Steels Creek and Dixons Creek were all heavily affected. Yering Station, Sticks, Punt Road, St Huberts and Domaine Chandon all reported losing some amount of fruit to spot fires. Mornington Peninsula winemaker Tom Carson's Serrat vineyard was destroyed. The Yarra Valley Wine Growers Association estimates that around 25 percent of viticultural area was threatened or impacted by fires, and around 457 acres (1.85 km^{2}) have been damaged or destroyed, approximately 5 percent of the total planted area. In most places fire caused little direct damage to vines, but huge amounts of fruit were lost due to smoke taint.

== Winemaking and styles ==
Though a definitive Yarra Valley style doesn't exist, recent trends with its key varieties offer some insight.

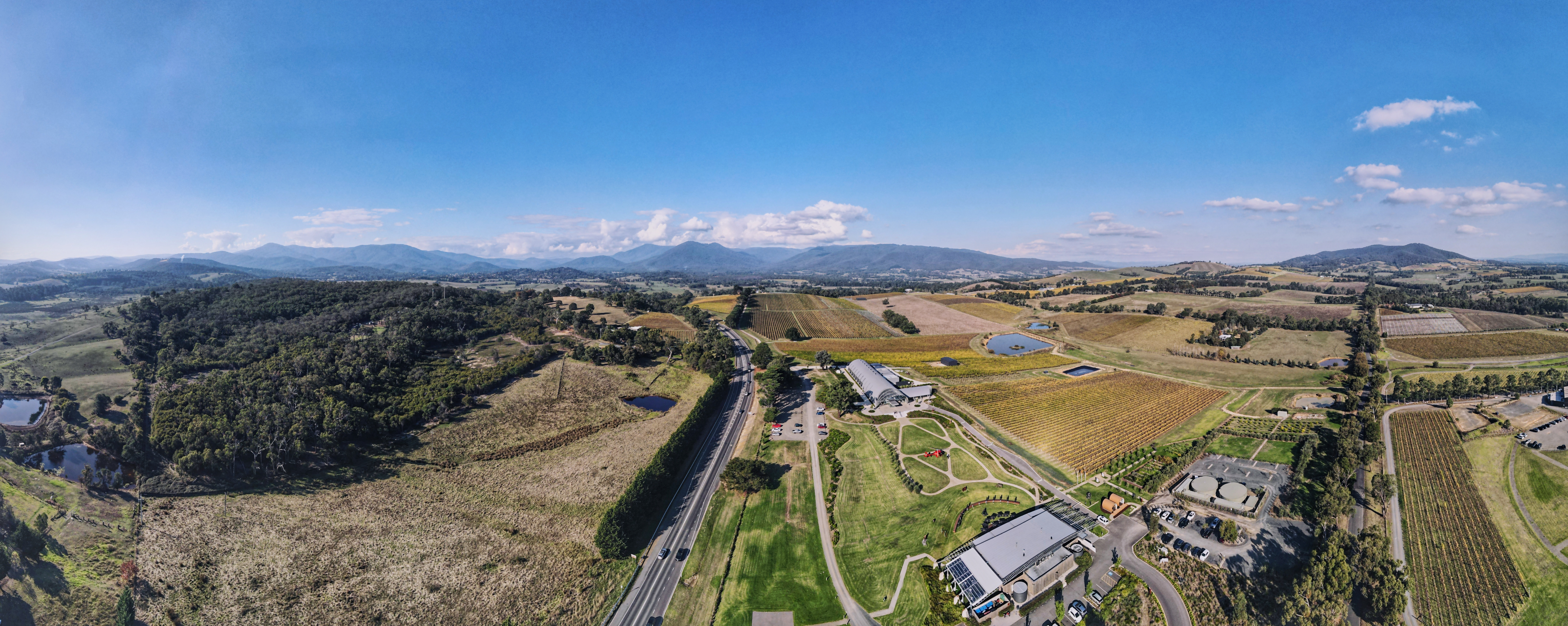
Yarra Valley wine region panorama. Facing East. Shot on 230422

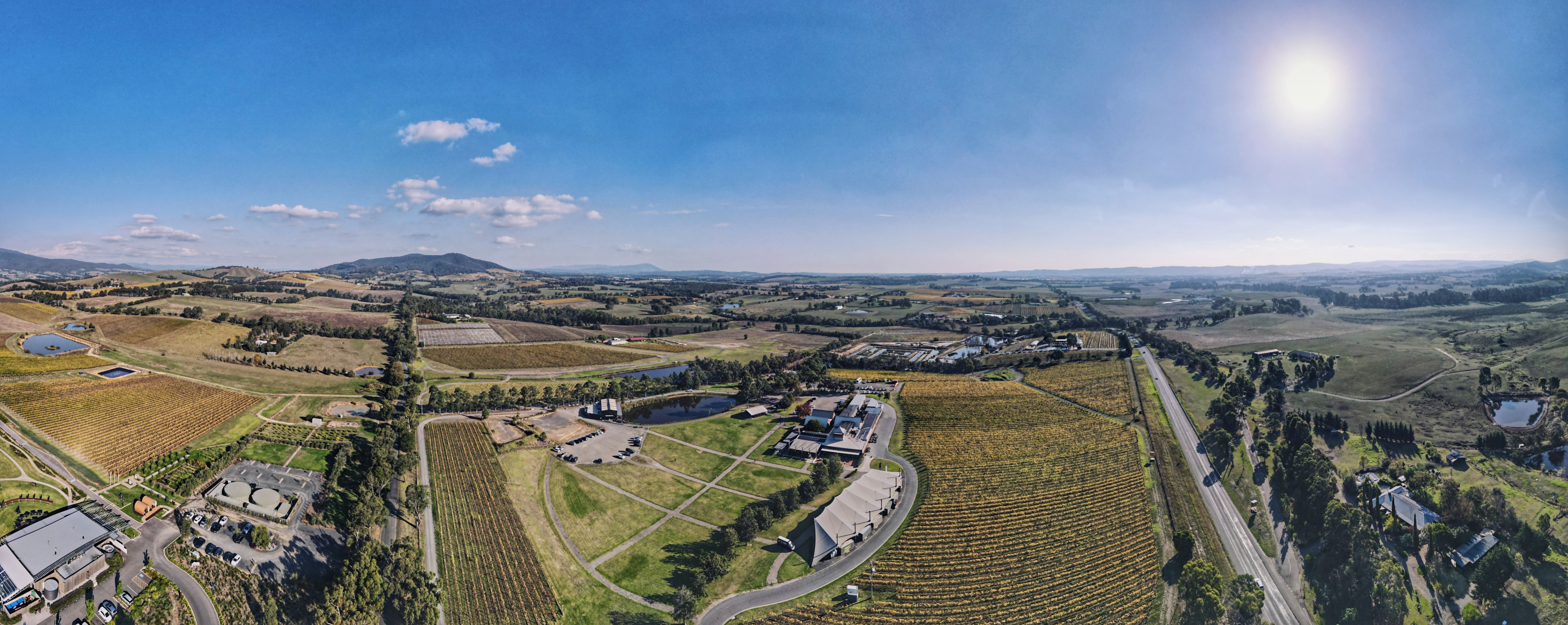
Yarra Valley wine region panorama. Facing West. Shot on 230422

=== Chardonnay ===
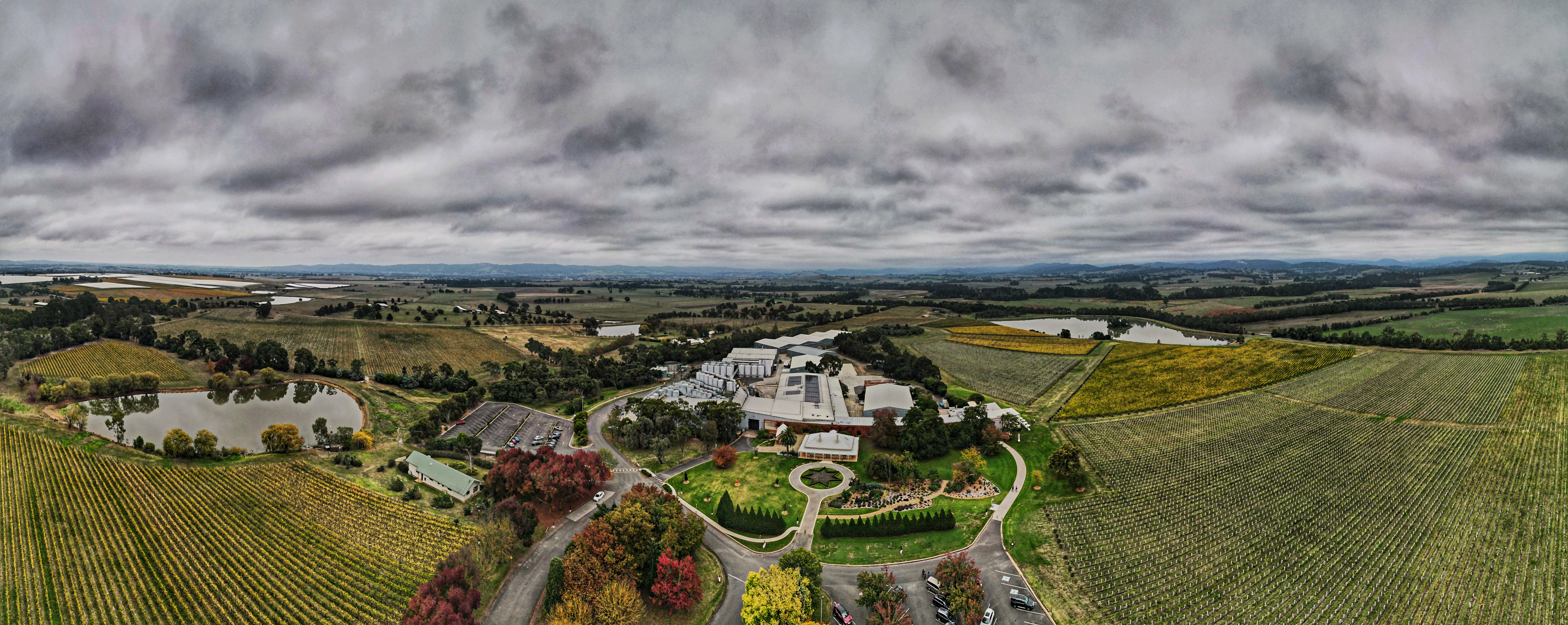
Domain Chandon Yarra Valley aerial panorama. Shot on 240422.

Chardonnay in Australia has long been associated with a deep, oily, buttery style that experiences full malolactic fermentation and excessive amounts of oak treatment, that has since gone out of fashion nationwide. Australia's cooler wine regions, especially the Yarra Valley, are leading the charge on leaner, acid-driven styles of Chardonnay, more closely aligned with Burgundy, with winemakers reducing or entirely preventing malic acid conversion and reducing both the duration of oak maturation and the percentage of new oak used. Oakridge Wines is a leading proponent of this style, their importance recognised in 2012 when Nick Stock (wine writer for The Age / Sydney Morning Herald and author of the annual Good Wine Guide) awarded the winery three honours: Chardonnay of the Year, Wine of the Year and Winery of the Year.

== See also ==
- Victorian wine
