= Lilly de Castella =

Australian colonist and winemaker

Lilly de Castella (born Elizabeth Anne Anderson) was an Australian colonist and winemaker. She is the eponym of the Shire of Lillydale and Lilydale, Victoria.

== Biography ==
De Castella was born Elizabeth Anne Anderson at Norfolk Island, one of four daughters of Lieutenant-Colonel Joseph Anderson, a military officer of the 50th Regiment of Foot and a statesman, and Mary Anderson, a pioneer member of the Melbourne Mechanics' Institute. Her father, who was commandant of the convict settlement from 1835 to 1939 at Norfolk, was one of eight nominated members of the Victorian Legislative Council. De Castella was called Lilly by her family. In 1848 her family settled in South Yarra. Living in Yarra, her family often socialized with other members of Yarra society including Sir Charles Hotham, Charles La Trobe and Clement Hodgkinson.

In 1856 she married Swiss nobleman and winemaker Paul de Castella, who owned a vineyard near Yering. They had one son and three daughters. Her husband was the brother of Hubert de Castella.

The town of Lilydale, Victoria, and the former Shire of Lillydale, are named after her.
