= Jessie Lavington Evans =

Australian artist

- Born: 1860
- Died: 1943 (aged 82–83)
- Education: National Gallery of Victoria Art School
- Known for: Painting

Jessie Lavington (or Laver) Evans (1860–1943) was an Australian artist who specialised in plein air impressionist painting.

== Biography ==
Jessie Lavington Evans was born in Albury, New South Wales on 25 March 1860 and died in Brighton, Victoria on 12 May 1943. She sometimes is referred to Jessie Laver Evans. She was one of three sisters. Her father was a storekeeper on the Murray River for many years. One of her sisters Ethel Amelia Murray Evans devoted her time to music, while Jessie Evans painted the Brighton scene.

== Career ==
Jessie Lavington Evans attended the National Gallery of Victoria Art School in 1880 and her fellow students that year included Tom Roberts, E Phillips Fox, Frederick McCubbin, Charles Douglas Richardson and Jane Sutherland while Julian Ashton and Rupert Bunny joined in 1881 and Arthur Streeton attended in 1882.

Jessie Lavington Evans was a well-known artist, born in Albury in the 1860 and she was the daughter of William Bird Evans who managed T.H Mates Store. Jessie is reputed to have painted the portrait of Thomas and Charlotte Mitchell, early settlers in the area.

For more than fifty years, Jessie L. Evans lived with her family at "Clifton" 14 Dendy Road, Brighton (one block from beach), but was never allowed to work or sell her artworks because it would cast aspersions on her father’s and the family’s ability to support her. However, between 1896 and 1899, she maintained an artist’s studio at 123 & 125 William Street and later 230 Collins Street. In 1880, Jessie L. Evans exhibited at the Intercolonial Industrial Exhibition in Melbourne. She received her artistic training at the National Gallery of Victoria School (1880-1891; 1903- 1904) under Fred McCubbin and George Folingsby, being awarded (1888) 2nd Prize for Still-Life and (1890) 2nd Prize for Best Drawing from Antique. Between 1894 and 1898, she also studied at the Melbourne School of Art under E. Phillips Fox and Tudor St George Tucker, being awarded (1894 and 1897) Prizes for Landscape. In 1890, the Table Talk's art critic said of her interior painting "There is clever painting in every detail of the picture, and the drawing is certain,..." and of a portrait "…a good portrait, finely modelled and free of any suggestion of slap-dash execution." and of a flower piece "is crisply and vigorously painted." and of a study of drapery" the management of light and shade is noticeably good."

In Melbourne, Jessie L. Evans exhibited at student exhibitions at the National Gallery of Victoria and the Melbourne School of Art, and at the Victorian Artists Society until 1896, her artworks always receiving good comments from the art critics. In the late-1890s, Jessie L. Evans had to withdraw from exhibiting and selling her artworks because her father felt that exhibiting artworks for sale was unladylike and cast aspersions upon his ability to support his family. Throughout her adult life, Jessie’s career was simply listed as "house duties."

Jessie L Evans kept painting plein air landscapes after her father prevented her from selling works. The mother of artist Sybil Craig, who was an art collector, acquired a large collection of Jessie's works after her death in the 1940s and these works passed to her daughter and were sold by the latter's estate in 1992 at Capricorn Galleries, Fitzroy in a survey exhibition, Australian women artists that also included remnants of the estate of Clara Southern. In 2021 her work was included with a number of Australian Impressionist works in an exhibition at the Bayside Gallery documenting the many artists who have lived around Brighton.
