= Victorian wine =

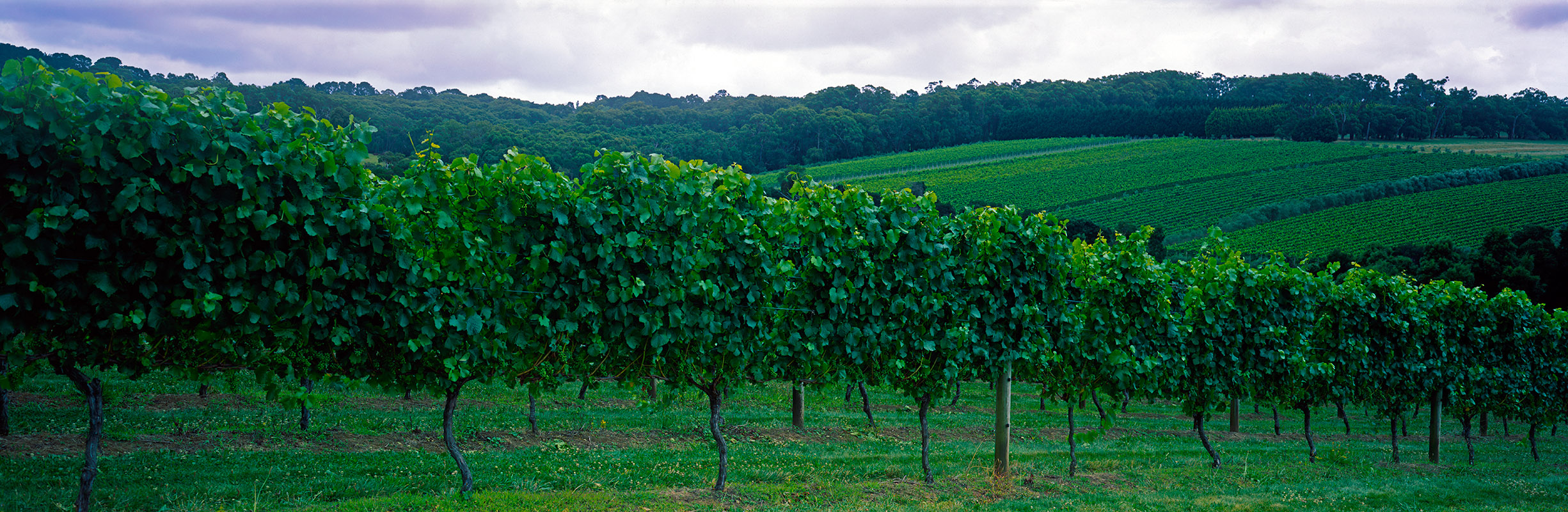
Mornington Peninsula vineyard

Victorian wine is wine made in the Australian state of Victoria. With over 6 hundred wineries, Victoria has more wine producers than any other Australian wine-producing state but ranks third in overall wine production due to the lack of a mass bulk wine-producing area like South Australia's Riverland and New South Wales's Riverina. Viticulture has existed in Victoria since the 19th century and experienced a high point in the 1890s when the region produced more than half of all wine produced in Australia. The phylloxera epidemic that soon followed took a hard toll on the Victoria wine industry which did not fully recover till the 1950s.

Today winemaking is spread out across the state and features premier wine regions such as Heathcote, Rutherglen, Pyrenees and the Yarra Valley. Single varietal wines produced in Victoria include the Australian mainstays of Shiraz and Chardonnay as well as Cabernet, Merlot and Sauvignon Blanc with increasing plantings in the late 1990s and 2000s of Viognier, Sangiovese, Pinot noir, Pinot Gris and Nebbiolo, and even the more obscure Graciano, Lagrein and Tannat. Victorian red wines are often described as more elegant than the robust styles of South Australia, although the style of wine ranges from lighter elegant Pinot Noirs to medium and full bodied Shiraz and Cabernets. Rutherglen is renowned for its distinctive Madeira-like fortified wines such as Liqueur Muscat.

== History ==
A Victorian Sauvignon blanc.

Some of the earliest commercial plantings in Victoria were near Yering and established by Hubert de Castella, a Swiss immigrant who came to the region in 1854. The devastation of France's vineyards by the phylloxera aphid opened up an opportunity to capture the British wine market which traditionally depended on French wine. In his 1886 treatise, John Bull's Vineyard, Castella ambitiously laid out his plans for Victoria to produce enough wine to supply all of England's needs. Unfortunately, before his grand plan could be fully realized, phylloxera made its own way to Australia and the viticultural setback was compounded with the development of the domestic temperance movement, as well as economic uncertainty and labor shortages during the first World War.

Early in Victoria's wine history, most of the wine industry was settled in the cool southern coastal regions around Melbourne and Geelong. At the turn of the 20th century, focus began to move to the warmer north-eastern zone around Rutherglen. The region began to establish a reputation for its sweet, fortified wines made from late harvest grapes that are shrivelled to near raisins and then spend several months (or years) aging in oak barrels stored inside a hot tin shed that acts like an oven. The unique nature of these Liqueur Muscat and Liqueur Tokay styles helped sustain that part of the Victoria wine industry until the country-wide wine renaissance of the 1950s & 1960s.

== Wine zones and regions ==
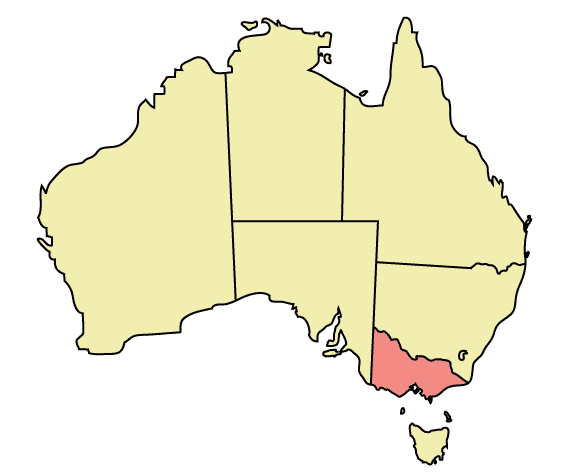
Location of Victoria within Australia.

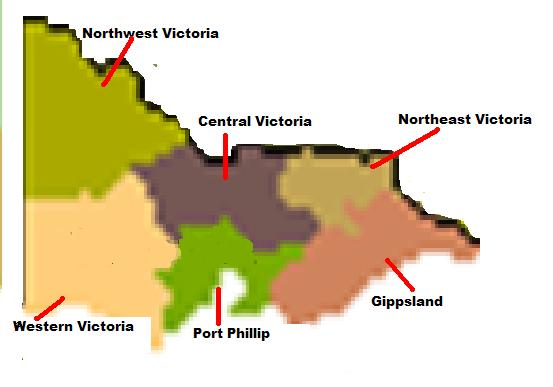
Victoria's wine zones.

Since the 1960s, Australia's labeling laws have centered on an appellation system that distinguishes the geographic origins of the grape. Under these laws at least 85% of the grapes must be from the region that is designated on the wine label. In the late 1990s more definitive boundaries were established that divided Australia up into Geographic Indications (GI) known as zones, regions and subregions. The wine zones of Victoria are Central Victoria, North East Victoria, North West Victoria, Western Victoria, Port Phillip and Gippsland.

Gippsland is one of the newest and least developed wine regions in Victoria. Serious planting did not begin till the late 1970s. Located to the east of the Mornington Peninsula, the region is current dominated with Pinot noir and Chardonnay plantings. Sparkling wine has shown some potential here with the Chardonnay and Pinot noir grapes showing a bit of spiciness that adds complexity to the wine.

=== Central Victoria ===
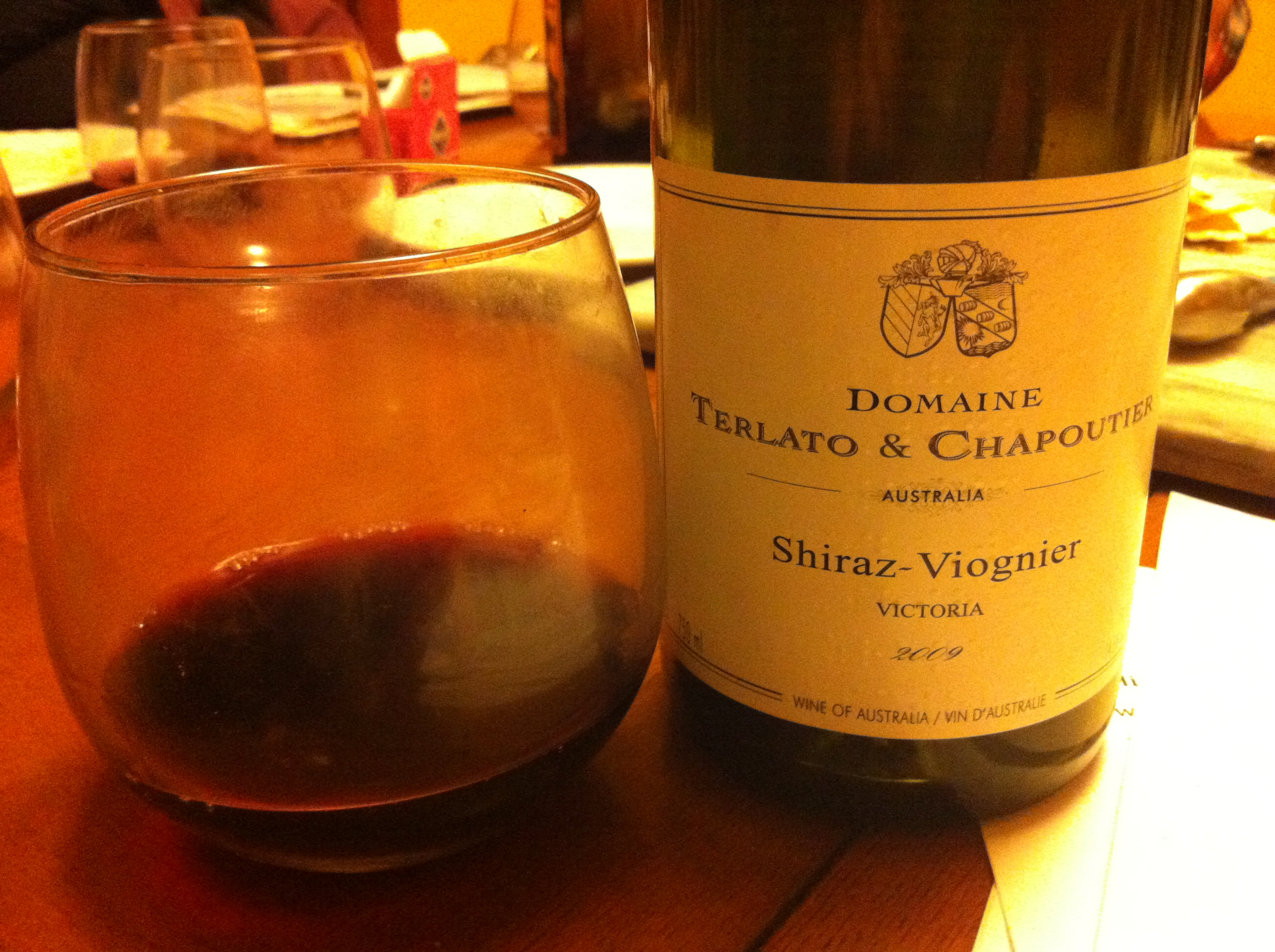
An Australian Shiraz-Viognier made in Victoria through a collaboration with Terlato and Chapoutier.

- Heathcote wine region is known for its temperate climate and 500 million year old Cambrian soil that seems particularly well suited for producing deeply colored, rich Shiraz wines with alcohol levels around 14-15%.
- Bendigo was historically a part of the Heathcote region but has since distinguished itself with its Cabernet Sauvignon.
- Goulburn Valley wine region stretches. from Seymour to Echuca on the Murray River, is the oldest continuously producing Victorian wine region and has been producing Shiraz, most notably at Tahbilk, since 1860. Marsanne, Cabernet Sauvignon and Chardonnay are also widely planted.
- Strathbogie Ranges wine region is one of Central Victoria's cooler wine regions and more closely resembles the North East Victoria regions of Alpine Valleys and Beechworth. The region is known primarily for its Chardonnay, Riesling, Gewürztraminer, Pinot gris and Viognier.

=== North East Victoria ===
- Alpine Valleys & Beechworth are known mostly for their table wine production in an area that is distinctively cooler than other North East Victorian wine regions. Some wineries have experimented with Piedmont wine grapes, such as Nebbiolo, Dolcetto and Barbera to some degree of success in this subalpine climate.
- Glenrowan & Rutherglen are known for their full-bodied red wines made from Shiraz and Durif as well as their sweet fortified wines. The continental climate of the area is marked by very warm summers and moderate evenings. Rainfall is very low and spring frost pose a viticultural hazard. Closer to Mount Buffalo, the vineyards located in nearby Ovens Valley receive more rainfall and cooler temperatures. The first record of plantings in this area date to 1851 and by the 1870s, this was Australia's largest wine-producing area.
- King Valley is known for its wide range of planted grape varieties including Graciano, Marzemino, Mondeuse, Petit Manseng, Sagrantino, Saperavi and Tannat. Post-war Italian immigration to the area led to a range of grape varietals being grown that reflected the heritage of the new arrivals. In particular, Prosecco and Sangiovese were pioneered in this region. The region is located on mountainous terrain, with a range of soil types fed by the clear King River, and receives varying degrees of rainfall depending on the location. The Brown Brothers Milawa Vineyard was established here in 1889.

=== North West Victoria ===
The North West Victoria zone is the most similar Victorian wine region to South Australia's Riverland in that generous irrigation sources provides for high yielding production. Lindemans Bin 65 Chardonnay was first produced in this region, and it produces some of the grapes for Yellow Tail.

- Murray Darling
- Swan Hill

=== Western Victoria ===
The geography of Western Victoria covers flat pastures and granite escarpment. With low annual rainfall, the area relies heavily on irrigation. Springtime frost is a risk factor in some of the higher altitude vineyards. The generally warm summers allow for optimal ripening of varieties such as Cabernet Sauvignon and Shiraz. Winters are normally cold and rainfall is variable with El Niño and La Niña affecting seasonal rainfall. The far southwest of the west has more of a maritime climate.

- Grampians, with its sub region Great Western, is generally a cooler climate red wine-producing region known for juicy berry fruit Shiraz and Cabernets with distinctive eucalyptus and spice. The area has experienced some success with Riesling and sweet sparkling wine.
- Henty has a cooler climate than the Grampians and produces more white wines and a little Pinot noir. The main varieties are Chardonnay, Riesling, Semillon, and Sauvignon blanc.
- Pyrenees is best known for its Shiraz and Cabernet Sauvignon that have some similarities to the wines produces in Heathcote and Bendigo. Chardonnay and Sauvignon Blanc are widely planted however the last decade has seen an increase in other varieties such as Viognier and Pinot Gris amongst others. Sauvignon Blanc from this region has a distinctive flinty dryness that is found underneath layers of tropical fruits.

=== Port Phillip ===
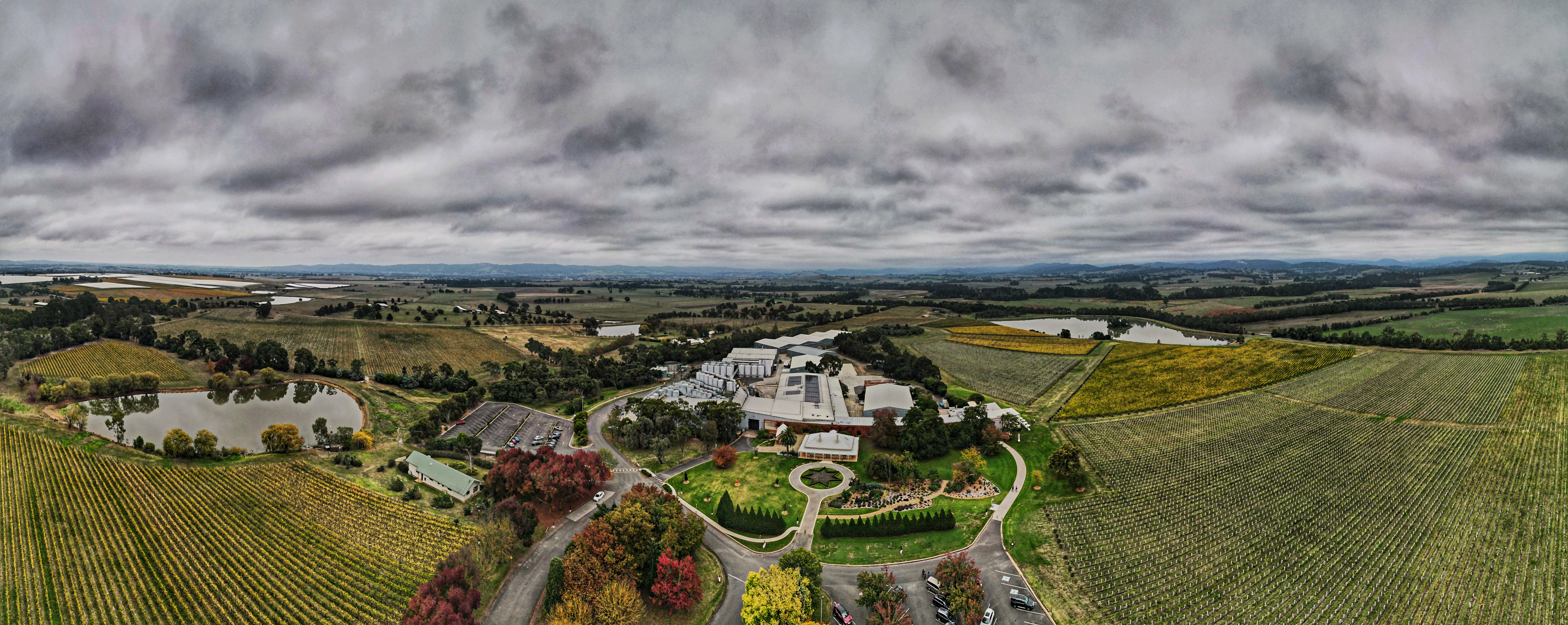
Domaine Chandon Yarra Valley aerial panorama. Shot on 240422.

The Port Phillip zone includes the five regions clustered around Melbourne. The climate of this more closely resembles Bordeaux than in other Australia wine regions yet it is more thoroughly planted with Burgundy wine varieties like a Pinot noir and Chardonnay. Other areas are planted with Shiraz.

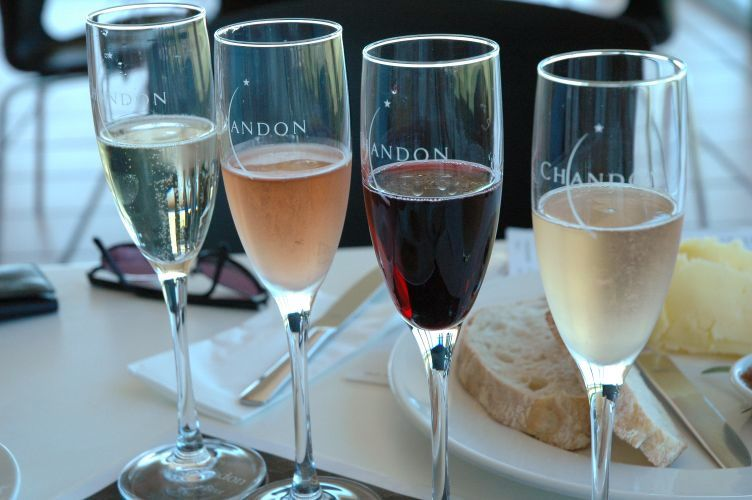
Sparkling wines and a still Pinot noir wine from Domaine Chandon's Yarra Valley winery.

- Yarra Valley is a cooler climate region and is known primarily for its Chardonnay and Pinot noir. The area has been cultivating a reputation for quality wine for over a century. In recent times, the sparkling wine industry has started to take notice with Moët et Chandon opening up Domaine Chandon Australia and producing wine under the Green Point label. The first vineyards were believed to have been planted here in the late 1830s and by the end of the 19th century, wines from the Yarra Valley were winning gold medals at European wine competitions. In the 1970s, the region experienced its own renaissance and has leveraged its close location to Melbourne to become a tourist destination for wine. The warmer climate of the Valley has shown itself suitable for Shiraz and Cabernet and has shown promise for Roussanne, Marsanne, Sauvignon blanc and Pinot gris.
- Macedon Ranges is known for its Cabernet Sauvignon and Merlot wines. The area sits on predominately granite based soils that has shown some promise for the sparkling wine varieties of Pinot noir and Chardonnay. Some Shiraz wines from this region have developed cult status due to their reputation for powerful fruit, spice and soft tannins.
- Sunbury is located north-west of Melbourne and has been producing Shiraz since 1872. Is known particularly now for its Shiraz-Viognier blends that are more terroir driven than New World.
- Geelong is heavily influenced by nearby Port Phillip Bay and has been achieving international recognition for the quality of its Pinot noir, Chardonnay, Riesling and Viognier. As one of mainland Australia's most southernly wine regions, vineyards around Geelong enjoy a long growing season influenced by maritime conditions. This helps the grape develop a complexity of flavours and depth in character for the resulting wines.
- Mornington Peninsula is located south across Port Phillip Bay from Geelong and shares a similar reputation for Pinot noir and Chardonnay but has been developing its plantings of Pinot gris. The area has a marginal climate that is influenced by maritime conditions across the hilly terrain. There are five "unofficial" sub districts on the Peninsula-Dromana, Main Ridge, Merricks, Moorooduc and Red Hill. The region is known for its medium bodied, dry wines and sparkling wines that show structure and complexity. The still wine versions of Chardonnay reflect a diversity of styles, from unoaked examples to others which have undergone fermentation and aging in new oak, in part or in total. Flavours range from citrus and white stone fruit characters to more tropical fruit flavours.

== See also ==
- Australian wine
