= Heinrich Egersdörfer =

German-born artist and illustrator (1853–1915)

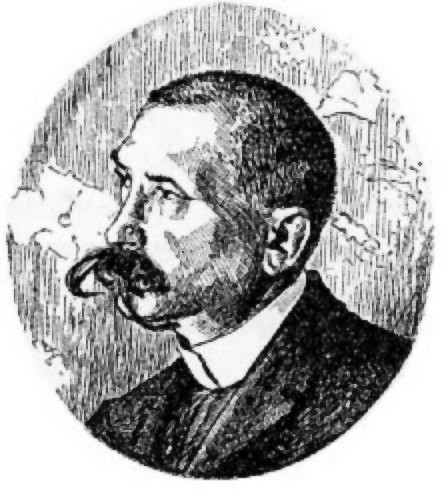
Heinrich Egersdörfer

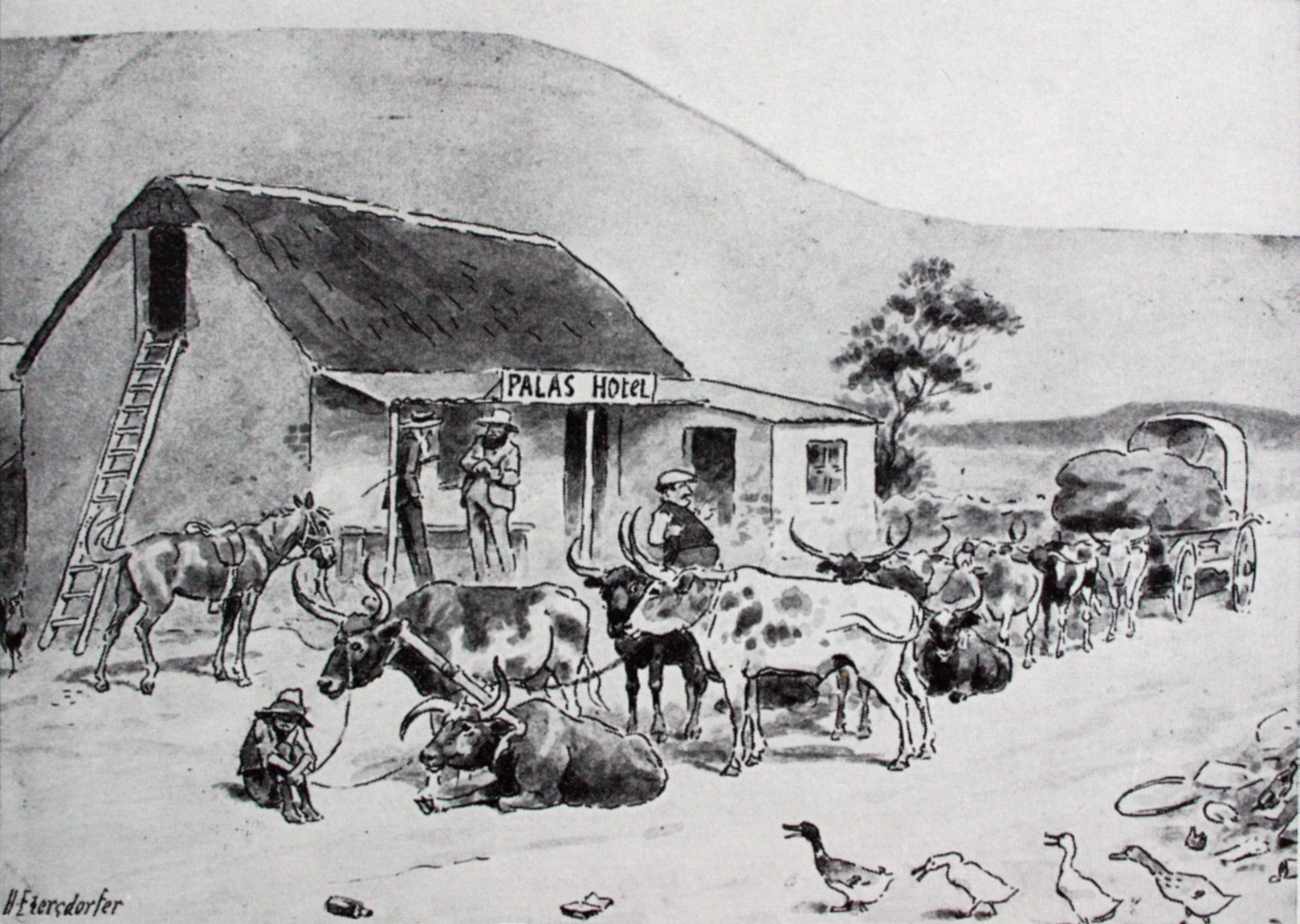
"A halt at a country roadside hotel"

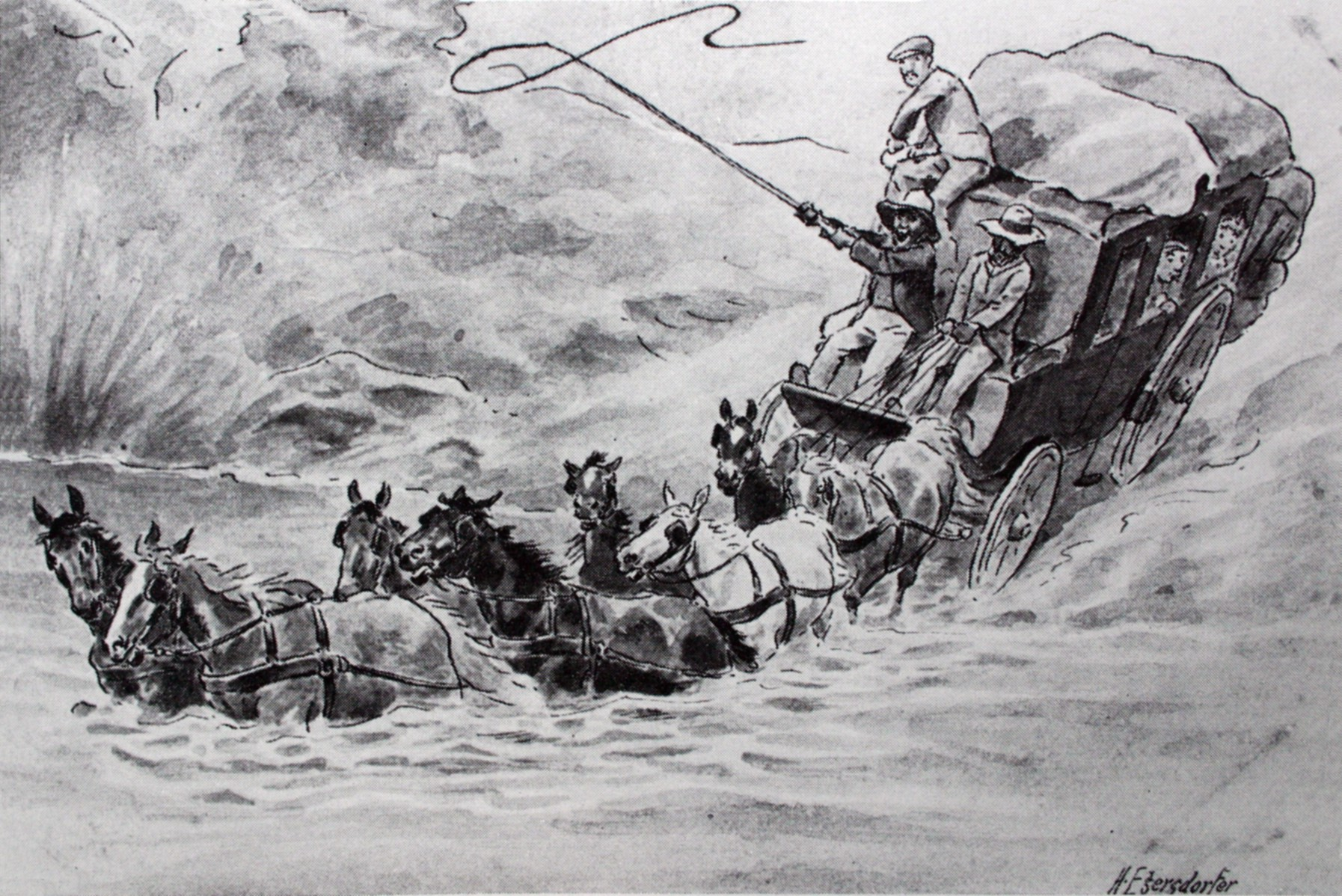
"Fording a river"

Heinrich "Heiner" Egersdörfer (1853 Nuremberg, Germany – 29 April 1915 St. Pancras, London), was a German-born artist, illustrator and cartoonist who settled in South Africa.

Coming from a family of artistic talent (his brothers Andreas Egersdörfer (1866-1914) and Konrad Egersdörfer (1868-) were both accomplished artists and both died in World War I), he was trained as a lithographer in Germany and worked for the Leipziger Illustrierten Zeitung. He took part in the Franco-Prussian War of 1870, and then worked in England, before emigrating to South Africa in 1879. In 1884, he and his partners founded The South African Illustrated News in Cape Town. His sketches and drawings, often in a light-hearted vein, are an invaluable record of life in the Cape Colony and were often used in local publications. The South African Illustrated News came to an end in 1885 and he left for Australia, to return ten years later. The economic situation had improved during his absence, and he travelled to Kimberley, the Witwatersrand and Rhodesia. He started painting wildlife studies, which found a ready market and his work appeared in The Cape Argus, The Owl and other periodicals. He depicted numerous incidents and scenes from the Anglo-Boer War, some of which were published in The South African Review Book of 50 Famous Cartoons - A Unique Souvenir of the Anglo-Boer War 1899-1900. Between 1899 and 1901 he acted as local correspondent for The Graphic, many of his illustrations appearing in this weekly until 1908. In 1902 and 1903, he exhibited with the South African Society of Artists (SASA). Egersdörfer's original illustrations can be found in many South African art galleries and in the Africana Museum. His only known photograph appeared in The Cape Argus Weekly Edition supplement on "Famous South African Artists" on 26 December 1906. With the death in Cape Town of his wife, Mary Jane Creaney in 1901(?1903), and that of his son Heinrich (1896-1910), and beset by financial problems, he returned to Europe and London where he died in 1915. He was survived by his first son, Friedrich, born in Melbourne, Australia on 13 June 1894, died 6 November 1970.

== Bibliography ==
- Egersdörfer, Heinrich. The South African Review book of 50 famous cartoons: A unique souvenir of the Anglo-Boer War, 1899-1900 (Publisher: W.A. Richards 1900) ASIN: B0008COXV2
