= Sauvignon =

Sauvignon may refer to a number of wines:

- Sauvignon blanc – a white wine grape
- Sauvignon vert – a white wine grape widely planted in Chile. Also a name in California for Muscadelle
- Sauvignon gris – a pink wine grape
- Cabernet Sauvignon – a red wine grape
