= Hiram Brülhart =

Swiss artist (1878-1949)

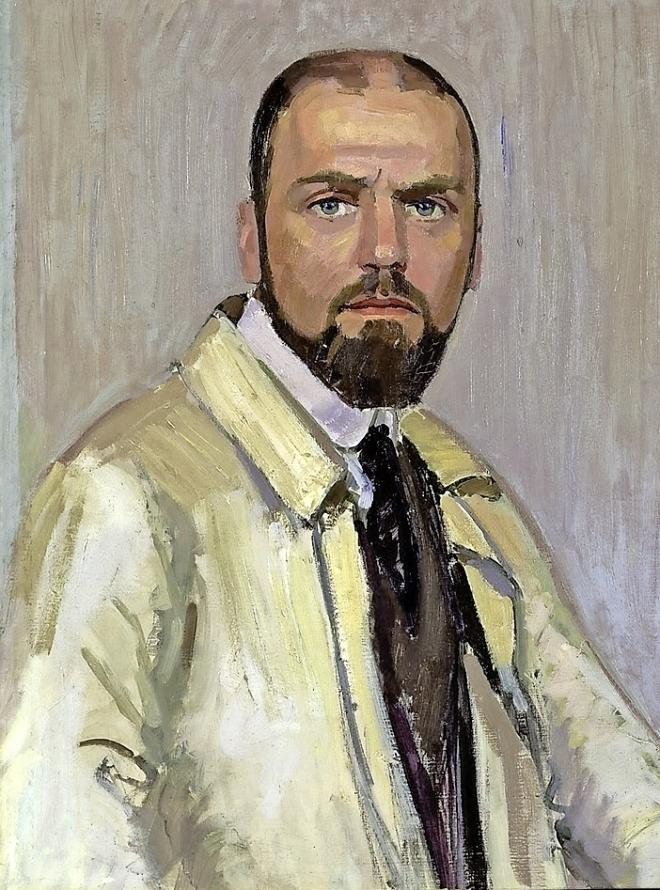
- Born: 14 October 1878; Fribourg, Switzerland
- Died: 22 March 1949 (aged 70); Fribourg, Switzerland
- Known for: Painting

Ernest Hiram Brülhart (1878 in Fribourg – 1949 in Fribourg), was a Swiss painter and illustrator.

== Biography ==
Born in Fribourg in 1873, Ernest Hiram Brülhart first became an engineer before he followed Ferdinand Hodler's classes at the Musée industriel in Fribourg encouraged by the painter Joseph Reichlen. He then went to Paris where he attended first the Académie Julian circa 1900, and then the Académie de la Grande Chaumière. A very frequent traveller, he stayed in Saint-Tropez, visited Bucharest where he was invited by his friend and mecene the ambassador René de Weck, then in Venice, before he finally came back to Fribourg. He was then a teacher at the Ecole des arts et métiers, where he had Gaston Thévoz as a student.

== Works in public institutions ==
- Portrait du Ministre René de Weck, vers 1934. Musée d’Art et d’Histoire, Fribourg
- Romont de l'ouest, 1930–1949. Musée d’Art et d’Histoire, Fribourg
