= Musée d'art et d'histoire (Fribourg) =

Swiss museum

Coordinates: 46.8078°N 7.1595°E

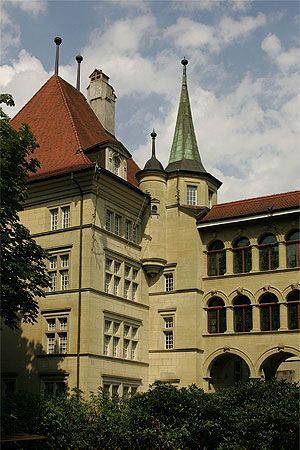
The hôtel Ratzé

The Musée d'art et d'histoire is a museum of art and history in the town of Fribourg in Switzerland, founded in 1774 by Tobie Gerfer. It is now housed in two main buildings - the 16th century hôtel Ratzé and a former abattoir - on either side of rue de Morat and linked by an underground passageway. The arrangement of its galleries dates to a redisplay in 1981.

It mainly houses sculptures, paintings and decorative art produced in the town from the medieval era to the present day as well as 17th and 18th century historical items. It includes a glass-working gallery and a gallery devoted to the sculptor Adèle d'Affry alias Marcello.
