= Paul de Castella =

Australian winemaker

Paul Frederic de Castella (22 May 1827 – 14 March 1903) was a Swiss-Australian grazier and winemaker, the pioneer of viticulture in Victoria.

== Early life ==
De Castella was born in Neuchâtel, Switzerland, second-eldest son of Dr. Jean François Paul de Castella, and his second wife Eleonore, née de Riaz. He was a descendant of the Seigneurs de Castella, a noble family from Gruyère. In 1843 Paul started work in a bank; he went to England in 1847 to learn English and study commerce. Paul's eldest brother was Hubert de Castella.

== Australia ==
De Castella emigrated to Victoria, arriving in Melbourne on 28 November 1849 aboard the Royal George. In the following year he purchased the Yering cattle station, where in 1856 he planted the first vineyard in Victoria. He later entered business with Frédéric Guillaume de Pury. Castella in 1859 imported plant necessary for the cellar and ten thousand vines, half of which were Sauvignon and two thousand La Folle (the grape used for making the best Cognac), the latter of which were all failures. The produce of the Yering vineyard is now well known in the Australian wine market. De Castella won a Grand Pix for his wine at Paris Exhibition of 1889.

In 1856 he married Elizabeth Anne "Lilly" Anderson, the daughter of Lieutenant-Colonel Joseph Anderson.

De Castella died in South Yarra, Victoria, on 14 March 1903.
