= Hubert de Castella =

Australian winemaker

Charles Hubert de Castella (27 March 1825 – 30 October 1907) was a Swiss-Australian writer, artist and winemaker.

== Early life ==
De Castella was born in Neuchâtel, Switzerland, eldest son of Dr. Jean François Paul de Castella, and his second wife Eleonore, née de Riaz. He was a descendant of the Seigneurs de Castella, a noble family from Gruyère. De Castella was educated in Fribourg by Jesuits; he went to Germany and in 1843 to France. There he studied architecture for a number years and was naturalized. He served with the 1st Regiment of the Chasseurs from December 1848 to December 1853.

== Australia ==
Hubert visited his brother Paul in Victoria, arriving in Melbourne aboard the Marlborough on 23 March 1854. Hubert formed a partnership with Frédéric Guillaume de Pury running cattle, but returned to Switzerland in January 1856 for family reasons. Hubert returned to Victoria and finally settled there in 1862, when he purchased three thousand acres of land in the parish of Yering, Victoria, and commenced planting the now famous St. Hubert's vineyard. About 1875 he formed a limited company, under which the vineyard was carried on until 1879, when Andrew Rowan joined him as partner in the firm of De Castella and Rowan. In the early 1890s, the vineyard produced an average of seventy thousand to eighty thousand gallons of wine annually.

== Late life and legacy ==
In 1886 de Castella returned to Switzerland after the partnership with Rowan broke up. de Castella returned again to Victoria in November 1906, and purchased Charterisville, that remained in the family until c. 1965. De Castella died in Ivanhoe, Victoria, on 30 October 1907; he married Alice Frances, daughter of Robert Pitt Jenkins, MLC, on 9 September 1865. Together they had five sons and five daughters. The oldest son, François Robert de Castella (1867–1953), became a viticulture expert to the government of Victoria. One of the other sons, Jean-Edouard de Castella, lived mainly in Switzerland where he worked as a painter, an illustrator and a glassmaker.

Publications by de Castella include:

- Les Squatters Australiens (Paris, 1861)
- Notes d'un Vigneron Australien (1882)
- John Bull's Vineyard (1886)
