= List of Australian dark-skinned wine grape varieties =

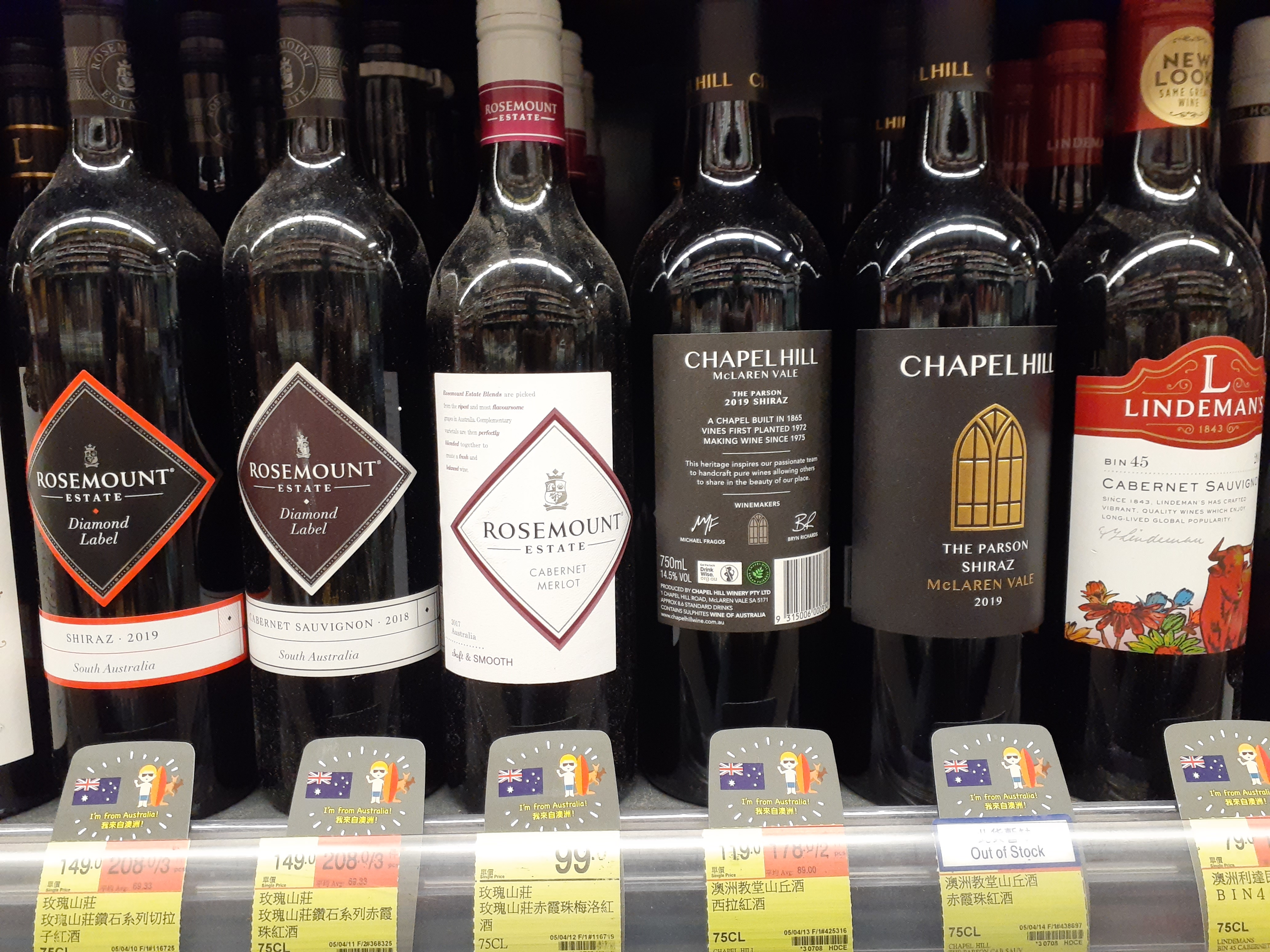
A selection of Australian varietals on sale in Hong Kong

Australia has over 160 grape varieties distributed on 146,244 hectares (ha) across all six states, South Australia, New South Wales, Victoria, Western Australia, Tasmania and Queensland (see Australian wine). These activities are concentrated largely in the southern part of the continent where the terroir - that is, soil types, local climate, availability of irrigation and so on - is suited to viticulture.

Together, the three sectors of the industry, grape growing, winemaking and wine tourism, play a major role in Australia's economy. In the 2018–2019 financial year, they contributed AU$45.5 billion to the national income. In addition, many other businesses benefit from the services they provide to the wine industry. (Note: A 1995 report to the Australian government summarised this: "Some cater exclusively for grapegrowers or wineries (eg harvesting contractors, bottling companies and fermentation equipment suppliers), but many also supply other industries in the region (although the wine industry may be their major customer). Included in this latter category are: transport companies; metal fabricators (eg manufacturers of stainless steel tanks); manufacturers of viticultural machinery; label manufacturers; suppliers of fertilisers and chemicals; consultants specialising in viticulture services; accounting and legal firms; and suppliers of packaging materials.")

== Abbreviations ==
- Colour of Berry Skin– N (noir – black), Rg (rouge – red), Rs (rose – pale red or pink), Gr (gris – grey or greyish-blue)
- FPS– Foundation Plant Service Grape Registry
- ha- hectare, a measurement of land area
- VIVC– Vitis International Variety Catalogue
- WA – Wine Australia
- WPG – Wein.Plus Glossary

== A–F ==
Grape	Color of Berry Skin	VIVC Variety No	Pedigree	Location - growers and makers	International homonyms and synonyms
Aglianico	N	121	Unknown	Adelaide Hills, Alpine Valleys, Barossa Valley, Beechworth, Bendigo, Canberra, Geelong, Heathcote, Hunter Valley, McLaren Vale, Mudgee, Murray Darling, Orange, Riverina, Riverland, Rutherglen, Tamar Valley	Aglianica, Aglianica de Pontelatone, Aglianichella, Aglianichello, Aglianico Amaro, Aglianico Comune, Aglianico Crni, Aglianico del Vulture, Aglianico di Benevento, Aglianico di Castellaneta, Aglianico di Lapio, Aglianico di Puglia, Aglianico Femminile, Aglianico Liscio, Aglianoico Mascolino, Aglianico Nero, Aglianico Noir, Aglianico Pannarano, Aglianico Trignarulo, Aglianico Tringarulo, Anglicano Verase, Aglianico Zerpoluso, Aglianico Zerpuloso, Aglianicone, Aglianicuccia, Agliano, Agliantica, Agliatica, Agliatico, Agnanico, Agnanico di Castellaneta, Alianiko, Casano Lavico, Casano Laviano, Cascavoglia, Cassano, Cerasole, Ellanico, Ellenica, Ellenico, Fiano Rosso, Fresella, Gagliano, Gesualdo, Ghiandara, Ghianna, Ghiannara, Glianica, Gnanica, Gnanico, Granica, Granico, Hellanica, Malvasia, Olivella, Olivella di San Cosmo, Olivella di S. Cosmo, Pié di Colombo, Prié Blanc, Ruopolo, Spriema, Tintora, Tringarulo, Uva Aglianica, Uva Castellaneta, Uva dei Cani, Uva di Castellaneta, Uva Nera, Zuccherina
Aleatico	N	259	Muscat à Petits Grains Blanc x ?	Darling Downs, Hilltops, Hunter Valley, Mudgee, South Coast, Southern Highlands	Aglianico Dolce, Aglianico Nero, Agliano, Agliatico, Aleatiau, Aleatica, Aleatica di Firenze, Aleatichina, Aleatico 88, Aleatico 83, Aléatico, Aleatico Ceragino, Aleatico Ciliegino, Aleatico Comune, Aleatico de Corse, Aleatico de Florence, Aleatico de Solmona, Aleatico dell'Elba, Aleatico di Altamura, Aleatico di Benevento, Aleatico di Firenze, Aleatico di Portoferraio, Aleatico di Solmona, Aleatico di Sulmona, Aleatico di Toscana, Aleatico Gentile, Aleatico Nera, Aleatico Nera della Toscana, Aleatico Nero, Aleatico Nero della Toscana, Aleatico Nero di Fermo, Aleatico Nero di Firenze, Aleatico Perugino, Aleaticu, Aleatiko, Aleatiko Nero, Alegatico, Aliatico, Aliatico degli Abruzzi, Aliatico di Benevento, Aliaticu, Alleaticu, Allianico, Allianico degli Abruzzi, Blacan, Bogay Blauer, Bogvay, Bogvay Kék, Bogvay Szagos, Fekete Bogvay, Halaper, Halaper Muscat Traube, Halápi, Halápi Fekete, Halápi Kék, Halápi Muskotally, Halápi Szagos, Ispanskii Rozovyi, Lacrima Christi, Lakrima Dolche, Lakrima Kriati, Leatico, Liatica, Liatico, Livatica, Maleat Moscatello Nero, Malva, Mockatele Livatike, Moscatel Negro de Grano Mediano, Moscatele Livatice, Moscatelle Livatiche, Moscatello Nero, Moscato Antico, Moscato Nero, Moskatele Livatike, Muscat de Halap Muscatellus, Muscattraube Halaper, Muskat Toskanski, Muskat Toskanskij, Occhio di Pernice, Occhio di Pernice Nera, Ogliatico, Pelaverde, Rossanella, Szagos Halápi, Szagos Kadarka, Uva Antica Nera, Uva dei Gesuiti, Uva Liatica, Uva Liatico, Uva Liatika, Vernacchia di Pergola, Vernaccia Moscatella, Vernaccia Pergola
Alicante Bouschet	N	As Alicante Henri Bouschet - 304	Grenache = Garnacha Tinta x Petit Bouschet	Adelaide Plains, Barossa Valley, Eden Valley, Glenrowan, Hunter Valley, Margaret River	Alicant de Pays, Alicante, Alicante Bouchet, Alicante Bouschet 2, Alicante Bouschet Crni, Alicante Enrico Bouschet, Alicante Extra Fertile, Alicante Femminello, Alicante H. Bouschet, Alicante Henri Bouschet, Alicante Nero, Alicante Noir, Alicante Tinto, Alicantina, Alikant, Alikant Buse, Alikant Buse Bojadiser, Alikant Bushe, Alikant Bushe Ekstrafertil, Alikant Bushe Nr. 2, Alikant Genri Bushe, Alikant Henri Bouschet, Aragonais, Aragonês, Arrenaou, Baga, Bakir Uezuemue, Barvarica, Blasco, Bojadiserka, Carignan Jaune, Colorina, Colorina di Pisa, Cupper Grape, Dalmatinka, Garnacha, Garnacha Tintorea, Garnacha Tintorera, Kambusa, Lhadoner, Likant, Likavit, Moraton, Mouraton, Murviedro, Negral, Pé de Perdiz, Pé de Pombo, Petit Bouschet, Redondal, Rikant, Rivesaltes, Rivos Altos, Roussillon, Rouvaillard, Sumo Tinto, Tinta Fina, Tinta Francesa, Tinto, Tinto Nero, Tinto Velasco, Tintorera, Tintorero de Liria, Tintorera de Longares, Tintoria, Tinturao, Uva di Spagna
Alvarelhão	N	1650	Unknown	Yarra Valley	Albarello, Alvaralhão, Alvaralhão de Pé Branco, Alvaralhão de Vara Branca, Alvarelho, Alvarellão, Alvarello, Alvarello Gallego, Alvarelo, Alvarelyo, Avarilhão, Brancelhão, Brancelho, Brancellão, Brancellão Tinto, Brancello, Brencellão, Brencello, Broncellão, Locaia, Pilongo, Pirrauvo, Pirruivo, Serradelo, Serradillo, Uva Gallega, Uva Negra, Varancelha, Verancelha
Ancellotta	N	447	Unknown	Bendigo	Anacelatto, Ancellotta di Massenzatico, Ancellotti, Lancellotta, Lancelotta, Uino, Uvino
Aubun (Note: According to various sources, Aubun cuttings were brought from France to Australia in 1832 by James Busby and planted in his Hunter Valley vineyards. According to VIVC's records, an accession is said to be in the hands of CSIRO at its Merbein site. Following the consolidation of its wine research program in Adelaide, the assumption is that this accession has been transferred there.)	N	761	Unknown	Unknown	Ambrosina, Bonifaccenco, Bonifacenco, Bonifacengo, Bonifazina, Bonifazino, Carcaghjolu, Carcagiola, Carcajola, Cargajola, Caricagiola, Carignan de Bedoin, Carignan de Bedouin, Carignan de Gigondas, Carjcagiola, Carricadolza, Castelino, Corvo, Corvo Negro, Garricadolza, Grosse Rogettaz, Gueyne, Mariscola, Morescola, Motardie, Moustardier, Moustardier Noir, Moustardier Noir de Roquemaure, Moutardier, Murescola, Quenoise
Baco Noir	N	870	Piquepoul du Gers = Folle Blanche x Riparia Grand Glabre + Riparia Ordinaire	Riverina, Tasmania North West	24-23 Baco, Baco 1, Baco 1-24, Baco 24–23, Baco Negru, Bacoi, Bago, Bako Noar, Bako Noir, Bako Sieiski, Bako Speiskii, Bakon, E X A Wolfschlugen, Frybert
Barbera Durif,	N	As Barbera Nera - 974	Unknown	Adelaide Hills, Adelaide Plains, Alpine Valleys, Barossa Valley, Bendigo, Canberra, Central Ranges, Clare Valley, Coonawarra, Geographe, Eden Valley, Geographe, Grampians, Granite Belt, Gundagai, Heathcote, Hilltops, Hunter Valley, King Valley, Langhorne Creek, McLaren Vale, Macedon Ranges, Manjimup, Margaret River, Mornington Peninsula, Mudgee, New England, Orange, Perricoota, Perth Hills, Pyrenees, Riverina, Riverland, Shoalhaven Coast, South Burnett, South Coast, Southern Highlands, Sunbury, Swan District, Swan Valley, Western Plains, Yarra Valley	Barbera a Peduncolo Rosso, Barbera a Peduncolo Verde, Barbera a Raspo Rosso, Barbera a Raspo Verde, Barbera Amaro, Barbera Black, Barbera Blau, Barbera Crna, Barbera d'Asti, Barbera di Piemonte, Barbera Dolce, Barbera Fina, Barbara Fine, Barbera Forte, Barbera Grossa, Barbera Mercantile, Barbera Nera, Barbera Nera a Caule Rosso, Barbera Nera a Caule Verde, Barbera Noir, Barbera Noire, Barbera Nostrana, Barbera Riccia, Barbera Rossa, Barbera Rosta, Barbera Rotonda, Barbera Vera, Barberone, Besgano, Blaue Barbera, Cosses Barbusen, Gaietto, Lombardesca, Nigruia, Nigruz, Olivella, Sciaa, Ughetta, Uva Nera Antica di Viggiano
Bastardo (See Trousseau Noir)					
Black Muscat	N	As Muscat Hamburg - 8226	Schiava Grossa x Muscat of Alexandria	Barossa Valley, Mudgee	Aleatico, Black Hamburg, Black Muscat of Alexandria, Black Muskat, Black of Alexandria, Ceuro, Chasselas Muscat Golden Hamburg, Esperione, Fekete Muskotály, Frankenthal, Gamburg, Golden Hamburg, Gulabi, Hambourg Musqué, Hambro, Hamburg Misketi, Hamburg Moscato, Hamburg Muscat, Hamburg Musque, Hamburg's Muscat, Hamburger, Hamburgi Muskotály, Hamburgii Muskotály, Hamburgski Misket, Hamburgskii Misket, Hamburq Muskati, Hamburshi Muscat, Hamburski Muscat, Hamburski Muskat, Hampton Court Vine, Kekmuskotály, Khamburskii, Lampheare, Mai-Gui-San, Málaga Rouge, Mavro Moschato, Mei-Gui-San, Misket, Misket Hamburski, Misket Siyah, Moscate di Amburgo, Moscatel de Hambourgo, Moscatel de Hamburgo, Moscatel Negro, Moscatel Negro de Mesa, Moscatel Negro Gordo, Moscatel Nero, Moscatel Prato, Moscatel Romano, Moscatello Nero della Marmilla, Moscatellone Rosso, Moscato d'Amburgo, Moscato di Amburgo, Moscato Nero, Moschato Ambourgou, Moschato Amvourgou, Moschato Tyrnavou, Muscat Albertdient's, Muscat Cerni Alexandrisi, Muscat Cernii Aleksandriiskii, Muscat d'Hambourg, Muscat de Hambourg, Muscat de Hamburg, Muscat de Hamburgo, Muscat Gordo Encarnado, Muscat Hambourg, Muscat Hambro, Muscat Hamburg, Muscat Hamburg Crni, Muscat Noir de Hamburg, Muscat of Hamburg, Muskat de Hambourg, Muskat Gamburgskii, Muskat Gamburskij, Muskat Gamburskij, Muskat Hamburg, Muškat Hambursky, Muskat Trollinger, Muskateller Trollinger, Muskattrollinger, Myrodato, Myrodato Proimo, Oeillade Musquée, Red Muscat of Alexandria, Salamanna Rossa, Salisbury Violet, Siyah Misket, Snow's, Snow's Muscat Hamburg, Snow's Muscat Hamburgh, Tămaîioasă Hamburg, Tămaîioasă Neagra, Tamaioza Nyagra, Tamiioasa Hamburg, Tamiioasa Neagra, Temyioasa Nyagra, Trollinger Muscateller Blau, Trollinger Muskat, Venn's Seedling, Venn's Seedling Black Muscat, Visparu Sihwarser, Zibibbo Nero, Zibibbo Nero Moscato
Black Spanish (See Jacquez)					
Blaufränkisch	N	As Blaufraenkisch - 1495	Zimmettraube Blau x Gouais Blanc = Heunisch Weiß	Adelaide Hills, Yarra Valley	Blanc Doux, Blau Fränkisch, Blau Fränkische, Blaue Fraenkische, Blauer Lemberger, Blauer Limberger, Blaufranchis, Blaufranchisch, Blaufränkische, Blue Franc, Blue French, Borgona, Borgonja, Burgund Mare, Burgunder, Catonia Burgundica, Cerne Skalicke, Cerne Starosvetske, Cerny Muskatel, Chirokolistny, Cierny Zierfandler, Crna Frankovka, Crna Moravka, Enliyarpqli, Fekete Frankos, Fernon, Franconia, Franconia Nera, Franconia Nero, Franconien Bleu, Franconien Noir, Franconim Noir, Frankinja, Frankinja Crna, Frankinja Modrá, Frankonia, Frankos, Frankos Kék, Frankovka, Frankovka Cerna, Frankovka Crna, Frankovka Modrá, Fränkische, Fränkische Frankovka, Fränkische Schwarz, Fränkische Schwarze, Frühschwarze, Frankovna Crna, Fronkus, Frühschwarze, Frühschwarzer, Gamay Noire, Gamé, Grosburgunder, Großburgunder, Hartig Crna, Imberghem, Imbergher, Jubiläumsrebe, Karmazin, Kék Frank, Kék Frankos, Kékfrank, Kékfrankos, Lampart, Lampert, Lemberger, Limberg, Limberger, Limberger Black, Limberger Blauer, Limberger Noir, Limburske, Mährische, Mährischer, Mährische Schwarze, Mährische Schwarze Karmazin, Mährische Traube, Mährischer, Modrá Frankija, Modrá Frankinja, Modry Hyblink, Moravka, Moravske, Morva Frankinja Crna, Muskateller Schwarz, Nagy Burgundi, Nagyburgundi, Neskorak, Neskore, Neskore Cerne, Nescore Pozdni, Noir de Franconie, Oporto, Orna Frankovka, Portugais Lerouse, Portugais Leroux, Portugaise Rouge, Portugieser Rother, Pozdni, Pozdni Cerne, Pozdni Skalicke Cerne, Schwarz, Gamé, Schwarz Limberger, Schwarze Fränkische, Schwarze Grobe, Schwarzer Burgunder, Schwarzfränkische, Schwarzgrobe, Schwarzgrober, Serina, Shirokolistnyi, Sirokolidtnyj, Sirokolstnii, Skalicke Cerne, Skalicke Modre, Spätschwarzer, Starovetsky Hrozen, Sura Lisicina, Syrk Cerny, Szeleslevelü, Teltfürtü Kékfrankos, The Wide-Leafer, Vaghyburgundi, Velke Bugundske, Vojvodino
Boğazkere	N		Goulburn Valley	Saraplik Siyah, Saraplik Uezuem, Siyah Saraplik	
Bonvedro	N	As Parraleta - 8951	Unknown	Barossa Valley	Barriadorgia, Barriagorja, Bastardo, Bombedra, Boogastro, Bomvedro, Bonifaccencu, Bonifacienco, Bonifazino, Bonvedro, Bunifazinu, Cacagliola, Carcaghjola Nera, Carcaghjola Neru, Carcaghjola Neru, Carcagiola, Carcagliolu Neru, Carcajiola, Carcajola Noir, Cargajola, Caricagiola, Cua Tendra, Espegnin, Espegnin Noir, False Carignan, Lambrusco de Alentejo, Marota, Monvedro, Monvedro de Sines, Monvedro do Algarve, Monvedro Tinto, Morteira, Murteira, Olho Branco, Paraletta, Parralada, Parrel, Parreleta, Pau Ferro, Perrel, Preto Foz, Preto João Mendes, Ribote, Salceño Negro, Salzenc, Tinta Caiada, Tinta Calada, Tinta da Lameira, Tinto do Lameiro, Tinta Grossa, Tinta Lameira, Tinta Murteira, Tintorro
Brachetto	N	15630	Muscat à Petits Grains Blanc x ?	Adelaide Hills, King Valley, Yarra Valley	Bracchetto, Brachetto d'Acqui, Brachetto del Piemonte, Brachetto di Alessandria, Brachetto du Piemont, Calitor
Cabernet Franc	N	1927	Unknown	Adelaide Hills, Barossa Valley, Bendigo, Canberra, Central WA, Clare Valley, Coonawarra, Cowra, Currency Creek, Denmark, Frankland River, Geelong, Gippsland, Nagambie Lakes, Granite Belt, Grampians, Kangaroo Island, King Valley, Limestone Coast, McLaren Vale, McLaren Vale, Manjimup, Margaret River, Mount Benson, Mudgee, Nagambie Lakes, Orange, Padthaway, Peel, Pemberton, Porongurup, Pyrenees, Riverina, Rutherglen, Sunbury, Swan District, Yarra Valley	Achéria, Ardounet, Aroia, Arrouya, Auxquels, Baro, Beron, Bidure, Blauer Cabernet, Blauer Carmenet, Bordeaux, Bordo, Bordo Magher, Boubet, Bouchet, Bouchet Franc, Bouchet Saint-Émilion, Bouchy, Breton, Burdeas Tinto, Cab Nero, Caberné, Cabernet, Cabernet Aunis, Cabernet Bresciano, Cabernet d'Aunis, Cabernet Franc Blauer, Cabernet Franc Crni, Cabernet Franc Nero, Cabernet Franc Noir, Cabernet Francese, Cabernet Franc Noir, Cabernet Francese, Cabernet Franco, Cabernet Frank, Cabernet Gris, Cabonet, Cabrunet, Capbreton, Capbreton Rouge, Carbani, Carbenet, Carbonet, Carbouet, Carmené, Carmenet, Carmenet Blanc, Carmenet Grand, Carné Fran, Carvené, Couahort, Crouchen Negre, Crouchen Noir, Fér Servadou, Fér Servandou, Gamput, Grande Voiduré, Gro Kaberné, Gro Vidyur, Gro Vidyuz, Gros Bouchet, Gros Caberné, Gros Cabernet, Gros Vidure, Gros Vidyuz, Grosse Viduré, Hartling, Kaberné, Kaberné Fran, Kaberné Frank, Kabernet, Kabernet Frank Breton, Karbinet, Karmené, Messanges, Messanges Rouge, Morenoa Véron Bouchy, Noir Dur, Noir Duré, Petit Fér, Petite Vioduré, Petit Viduré, Petite Vigne Duré, Plant Breton, Plant de l'Abbé Breton, Plant des Sables, Qro Kaberné, Qro Vidyuz, Sable Rouge, Trouchet, Trouchet Noir, Tsapournako, Verdejilla Tinto, Véron, Véron Bouchy, Véronais, Viduré, Vuiduré
Cabernet Sanzey (sic.) (Note: The variety is referred to by Vinodiversity as "Cabernet Sanzey" The reference is actually to Cabernet Franc grown by Antoine Sanzay (correct spelling) in his vineyard in the region of Saumur-Champigny, Loire Valley, France.)	N	As Cabernet Franc - 1927	Unknown	Rutherglen	
Cabernet Sauvignon	N	1929	Cabernet Franc x Sauvignon Blanc	Albany, Barossa Valley, Bendigo, Blackwood Valley, Central WA, Clare Valley, Coonawarra, Cowra, Darling Downs, Denmark, Eden Valley, Frankland River, Gold Coast Hinterland, Goulburn Valley, Granite Belt, Hastings River, Hilltops, Great Lakes, Heathcote, Kangaroo Island, Langhorne Creek, Mclaren Vale, Manjimup, Margaret River, Mount Benson, Mudgee, Murray Darling, Orange, Padthaway, Peel, Perricoota, Perth Hills, Pyrenees, Riverina, Riverland, Shoalhaven Coast, South Burnett, Southern Fleurieu, Southern Highlands, Swan District, Swan Hill, Swan Valley, Yarra Valley, Western Plains, Yarra Valley	Biduré, Bordeaux, Bordo, Bouché, Bouchet, Bouchet Sauvignon, Bourdeos Tinto, Bouschet Tinto, Breton, Burdeos Tinto, Cab, Cabarnet Suivignon, Caberné, Caberné Sovinion, Cabernet Petit, Cabernet Piccolo, Cabernet Sauvignon Black, Caberner Sauvignon Blauer, Cabernet Sauvignon CL R5, Cabernet Sauvignon Crni, Cabernet Sauvignon Nero, Cabernet Sauvignon Noir, Cabernet Sauvignon Petit, Carbonet, Carbouet, Carmenet, Castet, Dzanati, Enfin, Epicier Noir, Franzosenrebe, Kaberne Sovinjon, Kaberné Sovinon, Kaberne Sovinyon, Kaberné Suvinjon, Lafet, Lafit, Lafite, Marchoupet, Meklii Chernyi, Menit, Navarre, Petit Bouchet, Petit Bouschet, Petit Cabernet, Petit Cavernet Sauvignon, Petite Viduré, Petite Pardé, Petite Viduré, Sauvignon, Sauvignon Rouge, Sauvignonne, Vaucluse, Véron, Vidignonne, Viduré, Viduré Petite, Viduré Sauvingon, Viduré Sauvignone, Viduré Sauvignonne, Viduré Duré, Vinduré Sauvignone
Canaiolo Nero	N	2037	Unknown	Barossa Valley, Canberra, King Valley	Cacchiume Nero, Caccione Nero, Caccione Nera, Cagnina, Calabrese, Canaiola, Canaiolo, Canaiolo Borghese, Canaiolo Cascolo, Canaiolo Colore, Canaiolo Grosso, Canaiolo Minuto, Canaiolo Nero, Canaiolo Nero a Raspo Rosso, Canaiolo Nero Comune, Canaiolo Nero Grosso, Canaiolo Nero Minuto, Canaiolo Pratese, Canaiolo Romano, Canaiolo Rosa, Canaiolo Rosso Piccolo, Canaiolo Toscano, Canaiuola, Cainaiuolo, Canajuola, Canojolo, Canajolo Lastri, Canajolo Nero, Canaijolo Nero Grosso, Canaijolo Nero Minuto, Vanina, Cannaiola, Cannaiola di Marta, Cannaiola Macchie di Marta, Cannajola, Colore, Colore Canino, Merla, Tindillaro, Tindilloro, Uva Canaiolo, Uva Canajola, Uva Canajuola, Uva Canina, Uva Colore Canaiola, Uva dei Cani, Uva dei Cani, Uva Donna, UVA Frosca, Uva Grossa, Uva Marchigiana, Uva Merla, Vitis Vinifera Etrusca
Caracosa (Note: For a description of the origin and trial test performance of the Shiraz clone 'Caracosa' see John Whiting's Selection of Grapevine Rootstocks and Clones for Greater Victoria.)	N		A clone of Shiraz	Rutherglen	
Carignan (See Mazuelo)					
Carménère	N	2109	Mourál x Cabernet Franc	Adelaide Hills, Barossa Valley, Granite Belt, Great Southern, Heathcote, Murray Darling, Pyrenees, Riverland, Western Plains, Yarra Valley	Bordo, Bouton Blanc, Caberné Karmener, Cabernella, Cabernelle, Cabernet Carménère, Cabernet Cosmo, Cabernet Gernicht, Cabernet Gernischet, Cabernet Gernischt, Cabernet Gerniseht, Cabernet Grande, Cabernet Grosso, Cabernet Italico, Cabernet Mix, Cabernet Shelongzhu, Carbonet, Carbouet, Carménègre, Caremenelle, Carmeneyre, Francesa Nera, Gran Vidyur, Grand Carmenet, Grande Viduré, Grande Vuiduré, Grosse Viduré, Kabené, Kabené Karmener, Kabernel, Karmene, Karmensel, Uva Francesca
Carnelian (Note: This grape was created in 1949 by Harold Olmo (1909-2006), former Professor of Viticulture at the University of California (although Olmo grapes says 1972, and Jancis Robinson described it as a "1936 California crossing."))	N	2115	(Carignan = Mazuelo x Cabernet Sauvignon) = Olmo F2-7 x Garnacha Tinta	Margaret River, Pemberton	
Chambourcin	N	2436	(Seibel 6468 x Subereux) = Seyve Villard 12-417 x Seibel 7053 = Chancellor	Coal River Valley, Gold Coast Hinterland, Queensland Zone, Hastings River, Hunter Valley, Huon/Channel, Langhorne Creek, Lower Region, McLaren Vale, Macedon Ranges, Manjimup, Mudgee, Northern Slopes, Riverland, Shoalhaven Coast, South Burnett, South Coast, Southern Highlands	26-205 Joannes Seyve, Chambourcine, Chamboursin, John Saym, Joannes Seyve 26-205, JS 26-205, Shambursen, Zhoan Seiv 26-205
Cienna	N	22337	Sumoll x Cabernet Sauvignon	Heathcote, King Valley, Swan Hill	
Cinsaut	N	2672	Unknown	Barossa Valley, Canberra, McLaren Vale, Geelong, Margaret River, Rutherglen	Bastardillo Serrano, Black Malvoisie, Black Prince, Blue Imperial, Boudalès, Bourdalès, Bourdales Kék, Bourdelas, Bourdelas Noir, Budales, Calibre, Chainette, Cincout, Cinqsaut, Cinq Saou, Cinq-sao, Cinq-saou, Cinqsaut, Cinquien, Cinsanet, Cinsault, Cinsaut Couche, Cubillier, Cuviller, Cuvillier, Espagne, Aspagnin Noir, Espagnol, Froutignan, Grappu de la Dordogne, Grecaù, Grecu Masculinu, Gros de Lacaze, Gros Marocain, Hermitage, Imperial Blue, Kara, Kara Takopoulo, Madiran, Madiran du Portugal, Málaga, Málaga Kék, Malvoisie, Marocain, Marroquin, Marrouquin, Maurange, Mavro Kara, Mavro Kara Melki, Milhau, Milhaud du Pradel, Moterille, Moterille Noire, Moustardier Noir, Navarro, Negru de Sarichioi, Oeillade, Oeillade Noire, Ottavianello, Ottaviano, Ottavianuccia, Ottavinello, Pampous, Papadou, Passerille, Passerille Senso, Pedaire, Petaire, Picanard Noir, Picardan, Picardan Noir, Piede di Colombo, Piede di Palumbo, Piede Rosso, Pipadou, Piquepoul, Piquepoul d'Uzès, Pis de Chèvre, Pis de Chèvres Rouge, Plant d'Arles, Plant d'Arles Boudales, Plant de Broqui, Poupe de Crabe, Poupo de Crabe, Poupo de Crabo, Pousse de Chèvre, Pousse de Chèvre Rouge, Primitivo di Bernalda, Prunalay, Prunelard, Prunelard, Prunelas, Prunelat, Prunella, Prunellas, Prunellas Noir, Prunestra, Quattro Rappi, S. Saul, Salerne, Samsó, Samson, São Saul, Senso, Sensu, Sinseur, Sinsó, Sinson, Sinsâou, Sinseur, Strum, Takopulo Kara, Tsintsào, Ulliade, Ulliaou, Uva Spina, West's White Prolific
Colorino (Note: WPG warns that Abrusco should not be confused with Colorino del Valdarno (Raverusto) or Muscat Rouge de Madère despite their shared synonyms and morphological similarities.)	N	As Abrusco = 32	Unknown	Canberra, McLaren Vale	Abrortine, Abrostalo, Abrostine, Abrostine Nero, Abrostino, Abrostolo, Abrostolo Dolce, Abrostolo Forte, Abrusco Nero, Abrusco Nero di Toscano, Abrusio, Abrustano Nero, Arostolo Dolce, Broustiana Rose, Colore, Colorino, Colorino del Valdarno, Colorino di Lucca, Colorino di Valdarno, Colorino Pisano, Jomarello, Lambrusco, Raverusto, Tintiglia II
Cornifesto	N	2846	Cayetana Blanca x Alfrocheiro	Rutherglen	Cornifeito, Cornifesta, Cornifesto no Dão, Cornifesto Tinto, Cornifresco, Gajo Arroba, Tinta Bastardeira
Corvina Veronese (Note: WPG warns that Abrusco should not be confused with Corbina, Corva (or Crova) and Corvinone Veronese despite their shared synonyms and morphological similarities.)	N	2863	Unknown	Hilltops	Corba, Corbina, Corgnola, Corniola, Corva, Corvina, Corvina Comùne, Corvina Doppia, Corvina Gentile, Corvina Nera, Corvina Nostrana, Corvina Pelosa, Corvina Reale, Corvina Rizza, Corvine Nostrana, Crevatizza, Croetto, Crovina, Cruina, Cruina Zervei de Gatto, Curvina, Curvinessa, Martinenga, Sgorbera
Counoise	N	3210	Unknown	Canberra, Frankland River	Aubon, Caula, Conese, Coneze, Connoges, Connoise, Counèse, Couneso, Counoïse, Counoïso, Counoueiso, Damas Noir, Grosse Rogettaz, Guénoise, Moustardier, Petit Ribier, Petit Rouvier, Quennoise, Quenoise, Ribier, Ribier Petit, Ribière, Rivier, Riviere
D3V14 (See Merlot)	N		A clone of Merlot		
Dolcetto	N	3626	Dolcetto Bianco x Moissan	Adelaide Hills, Adelaide Plains, Alpine Valleys, Barossa Valley, Central Ranges, Clare Valley, Geographe, Grampians, Heathcote, Hunter Valley, King Valley, Langhorne Creek, Limestone Coast, McLaren Vale, Macedon Ranges, Mornington Peninsula, Mount Benson, Pyrenees, Riverina, Tamar Valley, Yarra Valley	Acqui, Barbirono, Bathiolin, Batialin, Beina, Bignogna, Bignognina, Bignola, Bignona, Bignonina, Biguegna, Bonarda, Bourdon Noir, Cassolo, Charbonneau, Charbono, Chasselas Noir, Cinsiorlina, Côte Rouge Merille, Crête de Coq, Debeli Rifosk, Debili Rifosk, Deluz Nero, Dolcedo Rostieliger, Dolceto, Dolcetta Nera, Dolcetto a Raspeverde, Dolcetto a Raspo Rosso, Dolcetto a Raspe Verde, Dolcetto Crni, Dolcetto Nero, Dolcetto di Piemontese, Dolcetto Nero, Dolcetto Piemontese, Dolchetto, Dolcino, Dolcino Nero, Dolciut, Dolsin, Dolson Raro, Dolzin, Dolzino, Dosset, Douce Noire, Gioiabella, Gros Noir de Montelimar, Gros Plant, Kölner Rothstieliger, Männlicher Refosco, Mauvais Noir, Montelimar, Monteuse, Montmélian, Mosciolino, Nebbiolo, Nebbiolo Dolcetto, Nebbiolone, Nera Dolce, Nibièu, Nibiò, Noirin d'Espagne, Ocanette, Orincasca, Ormeasca, Ormeasco, Orneasca, Picot Rou, Picot Rouge, Plant de Calarin, Plant de Chapareillan, Plant de Moirans, Plant de Montmélian, Plant de Provence, Plant de Savoie, Plant de Turin, Plant du Roi, Premasto, Primaticcio, Primativo, Primativo Nero, Promotico, Provençal, Ravanellino, Red-handled Dolcedo, Refork, Refork Debeli, Refork Male, Refosk Debeli, Rothstieliger Dolcedo, Rostieliger Dolcedo, Savoyard, Schitterer, Turin, Turino, Uva d'Acqui, Uva d'Acquia, Uva del Monferrato, Uva di Acqui, Uva di Ovada, Uva di Roccagrimalda, Uva Ormeasca
Dornfelder	N	3659	Helfensteiner x Heroldrebe	Alpine Valleys, Huon/Channel, Tamar Valley, Tasmania Southern, Tasmania North West	Weinsberg S 341, We S 341
Durif	N	3738	Syrah x Peloursin	Adelaide Hills, Adelaide Plains, Alpine Valleys, Barossa Valley, Beechworth, Bendigo, Big Rivers, Canberra, Clare Valley, Geographe, Glenrowan, Goulburn Valley, Grampians, Granite Belt, Gundagai, Heathcote, Hunter Valley, King Valley, Langhorne Creek, Mornington Peninsula, Mudgee, New England, Perth Hills, Pyrenees, Riverina, Riverland, Rutherglen, Swan District, Swan Hill, Swan Valley, Yarra Valley	Dure, Duret, Petite Sirah*, Petite Syrah*, Pinot de l'Hermitage, Pinot de Romans, Plant Durif, Serine des Mauves, Sirane Fourchue (*Both used also as synonyms for Shiraz (Syrah))
8R (See Merlot)		A clone of Merlot			
Fer	N	4085	Unknown	Margaret River	Arech, Arrouya, Bequignaou, Béquignol, Bois Droit, Braucol, Brocol, Caillaba, Camaralet Noir, Camerouge, Camirouch, Chalamoncet, Chalosse Noire, Chausset, Couahort, Cruchinet, Ere, Estronc, Fer Bequignaou, Fer Noir, Ferre, Fer Servadou, Folle Rouge, Gragnelut, Hèr, Hère, Herrant, Herre, Mansin, Mansois, Mauron, Moura, Mouraa, Mourac, Mourach, Noir Brun, Petit Bordelais, Petit Fer, Petit Hère, Petit Mourastel, Petite Hère, Piec, Piek, Pienc, Pinenc, Plant de Fer, Queufort, Salebourg, Samençois, Saoubade, Saumances, Saumansois, Saumences, Scarcit, Servadou, Veron, Verron
Flora	Rs	15218	Sémillon x Gewürztraminer	King Valley, Murray Darling	California H 59-90
Freisa	N	4256	Nebbiolo x ?	Barossa Valley	Freisa del Piemonte, Freisa di Chieri, Freisa Grossa, Freisa Piccola, Freisetta, Fresia, Marchesana, Monferrina, Mounfrina, Spannina

== G–L ==
Grape	Color of Berry Skin	VIVC Variety No	Pedigree	Location - growers and makers	International homonyms and synonyms
Gamay Noir	N	4377	Pinot Noir x Gouais Blanc = Heunisch Weiß	Adelaide Hills, Beechworth, (Note: In Robinson's essay on the worldwide use of this variety, she says, "And then there is the remarkable Sorrenberg of Beechworth in north-east Victoria, Australia which make one of the most exciting Gamays I have ever tasted.") Canberra, Denmark, Geelong, Gippsland, Goulburn Valley, Heathcote, Hunter Valley, King Valley, McLaren Vale, Macedon Ranges, Margaret River, Mornington Peninsula, Mudgee, Riverina, Rutherglen, Southern Tasmania, Tamar Valley, Western Plains, Yarra Valley	About 150 synonyms including Beaujolais, Black melon grape, Bourguignon Noir, Caracairone, Gamai, Gamai Chatillon, Gamay, Gamay Beaujolais, Gamay Charmont, Gamay d'Arcenant, Gamay d'Auvergne, Gamay de la Dôle, Gamay de Liverdun, Gamay de Saint-Romain, Gamay de Sainte-Foix, Gamay de Toul, Gamay de Vaux, Gamay d'Orléans, Gamay du Gâtinais, Gamay Labronde, Gamay Noir, Gamay Ovoïde, Gamay Précoce, Gamé, Gammé, Grosse Dôle, Liverdun Grand, Lyonnais, Melon Noir, Petit Bourguignon, Petit Gamay, Plans Robert, Valais, Vaud
Garnacha Tinta (See Grenache)					
Gewuerztraminer (See Gewürtztraminer)					
Gewürztraminer	Rg	As Gewuerztraminer - 12609	A taste mutation of Savagnin Rose	Adelaide Hills, Alpine Valleys, Barossa Valley, Bendigo, Canberra, Clare Valley, Cowra, Coal River Valley, Coonawarra, Currency Creek, Denmark, Tasmania East Coast, Eden Valley, Frankland River, Geelong, Gippsland, Granite Belt, Hastings River, Heathcote, Henty, Hilltops, Hunter Valley, Langhorne Creek, McLaren Vale, Macedon Ranges, Margaret River, Mornington Peninsula, Mount Benson, Mudgee, New England, Northern Rivers, Orange, Pemberton, Perth Hills, Pyrenees, Riverina, Riverland, Shoalhaven Coast, South Burnett, Strathbogie Ranges, Swan District, Tamar Valley, Tasmania North East, Tasmania Southern, Upper Goulburn, Yarra Valley	Auvernas Rouge Clair, Blanc Brun, Blanc Court, Bon Blanc, Braunes, Cehrayi Traminer, Christkindelstraube, Christkindlestraube, Christkindltraube, Clevener, Cleverner, Clevner, Crescentia Rotundifolia, Crevena Ruziva, Crovena Ruzica, Crvena Ruzica, Crveni Traminac, Dišecí Traminec, Diseci Traminer, Dreimänner, Dreimännertraube, Dreimannen, Dreipfennigholz, Drumin, Drumin Ljbora, Ducistiy Traminer, Duret Rouge, Dushistiy, Dushisty, Dushistyi, Dushistyj, Dushistyj Traminer, Dusistiy, Edeltraube, Fermentin Rouge, Fleischrot, Fleischroth, Fleischvainer, Fleischweiner, Fleshvainer, Formentau, Formentin Rouge, Formenteau Rouge, Fränkisch, Fränkischer, Fragrant Traminer, French, Frenscher, Frentsch, Frentschentraube, Fromente Rose, Fromenteau Rouge, Füsyeres Tramini, Füszeres Tramini, Gelber Traminer, Gentil Aromatique, Gentil Rose Aromatique, Gentil-Duret Rouge, Gentile Blanc, Gentil Rose Aromatique, Gewürtz Traminer, Gewürztraminer, Gringet, Gris Rouge, Haiden, Heida, Heiligensteiner Klevner, Kirmizi Traminer, Kläbinger Klävner, Klävner, Kleinbraun, Kleinbrauner, Kleiner Traminer, Kleintraminer, Kleinweiner, Klevner von Heiligenstein, Livora, Livira Vervena, Liwora Cervena, Mala Dinka, Marziminer, Marzimmer, Mirisavi Traminac, Nature, Nature Rose, Noble Rose, Nuernberger, Nuernberger Rot, Nürnberger, Nürnberger Rot, Plant Paien, Pinat Cervena, Piros Tramini, Piros Traminire, Plant Paile, Princ Cerveny, Raminer Rozovyi, Ranfoliza, Roethlichter, Roetlichter, Röthlichter, Rötlichter, Romfoliza, Rosentraminer, Rotclevner, Rotedel, Roter Nuerberger, Roter, Roter Nürberger, Roter Nürnberger, Roter Traminer, Rotfranke, Rothedel, Rothedl, Rother Clevner, Rother Klevner, Rother Muskattraminer, Rother Nürnberger, Rother Riesling, Rother Traminer, Rothfranke, Rothfranken, Rothkläber, Rothklävner, Rothklauser, Rothweiner, Rothwiener, Rothklävler, Rotklauser, Rotklevner, Rousselet, Rousselett, Runziva, Rusa, Ruska, Ryvola, Salvagnin, Sandtraminer, Sauvagnin, Savagnin, Savagnin Blanc, Savagnin Jaune, Savagnin Rosa Aromatique, Savagnin Rose, Savagnin Rose Aromatique, Savagnin Rose Musque, Savanen Roz, Schieltraminer, St Clausler, St Klauser, Svenic, Termeno Aromatico, Tirolensis, Tokaner, Tokayer, Tramente Rose, Tramin Cervene, Tramín Červený, Tramin Korenny, Traminac, Traminac Crveni, Traminac Dišecí, Traminac Mirisavi, Traminac Mirisavi Crveni, Traminac Sivi, Traminec, Traminer, Traminer Aromatico, Traminer Aromatique, Traminer Epice, Traminer Épicé, Traminer Gelber, Traminer Musque, Traminer Parfumé, Traminer Pink, Traminer Red, Traminer Rosa, Traminer Rose, Traminer Rose Aromatique, Traminer Rosiu, Traminer Roso, Traminer Rosso, Traminer Rot, Traminer Roter, Traminer Roth, Traminer Rother, Traminer Rotter, Traminer Rouge, Traminer Roz, Traminer Rozovii, Traminer Rozovji, Traminer Rozovyi, Traminer Rozovyj, Traminer Rozowy, Tramini, Tramini Piro, Tramini Piros, Tramini Ruzh, Trammener, Tramminner, Variana, Wachenheimer Traminer
Gewürztraminer (See Gewürtztraminer)					
Graciano	N	4935	Unknown	Barossa Valley, Canberra, McLaren Vale, Geographe, Granite Belt, Margaret River, Pemberton, Swan Valley	About 80 synonyms including Alicante, Bastardo Nero, Bovale, Bovaledda, Bovaleddo, Bovaleddu, Bovale Sardo, Bovale Piccolo, Bovale Piticco, Cagliunari, Caglunari, Caglunari Bastardo, Cagniulari, Cagnovali, Cagnovali Nero, Cagnulari Sardo, Cagnelataat, Caldelata, Courouillade, Couthurier, Graciana, Graciano 15–5, Graciano de Haro, Graciano Tinto, Morastell, Minostello, Minustello, Minustellu, Minustillu, Monastrell Menudo, Monastrell Verdadero, Moristell, Morrastell, Muristellu, Negrette de Pays, Tannat Bordelais, Tannat Gris, Tinta de Fontes, Tinta do Padre Antonio, Tinta Fontes, Tinta Menuda, Tinta Miúda, Tintilla de Rota, Tintillo, Ualda, Xeres, Zinzillosa
Grenache	N	As Garnacha Tinta - 4461	Unknown	Barossa Valley, Central WA, Clare Valley, Cowra, Frankland River, Geographe, Kangaroo Island, Langhorne Creek, McLaren Vale, Murray Darling, Peel, Perricoota, Riverland, South Burnett, Swan Hill, Swan Valley, Western Plains	Abundante, Abundante de Reguenos, Aleante, Aleante di Rivalto, Aleeaante Poggiarelli, Alivant Blau, Alicante, Alicante de Pays, Alicante di Egua, Alicante di Spagna, Alicante Grenache, Alicante Noir, Alicante Roussillon, Alicantina, Alikante, Aniga di Lanusei, Aragonais, Aragones, Aragones Macho, Aragonesa, Bernacha Negra, Black Spanish, Black Valentina, Blaue Alicante, Bois Jaune, Cananao di Sardegna, Cannonaddu, Cannonadu, Cannonadu Nieddu, Cannonao, Cannonatu, Cannonau, Cannonau di Villasor, Cannonau Nero, Cannono, Canonao, Canonao Nero, Canonazo, Carignan Rouge, Carignane, Carignane Rosso, Carignane Rousse, Crannaxia, D'Alicante, Elegante, Espagnin Noir, Francese, Gamay, Gamay Perugino, Garnaccho Negro, Garnaccia, Garnacha, Garnacha Commun, Garnacha de Aragon, Garnacha de Riola, Garnacha del Pais, Garnacha Fina, Garnacha Negra, Garnacha Negra del Pais, Garnacha Pais, Garnacha Roja, Garnachilla, Garnacho, Garnacho Negro, Garnatxa Negra, Garnatxa Ni, Garnatxa Pais, Garnatxa Tinta, Garnaxa, Gironet, Granaccia, Granacha, Granacha Fina, Granache, Granaxa, Granaxia, Granaxo, Granazzo, Grenache, Grenache à Fleurs Femelles, Grenache Black, Grenache Crni, Grenache de Alicante, Grenache de Cosperon, Grenache Nero, Grenache Noir, Grenache Rouge, Grenas Crni, Grenash de Kaspero, Grenash Noar, Guarnaccia, Iladoner, Kek Grenache, Licante, Lladoner, Lladoner Aragonese, Lladoner Negre, Lladoner Negro, Lladonet, Mencida, Navalcarnero, Navaro, Navarra, Navarre de la Dordogne, Navarro, Negra, Negru Calvese, Ranaccio, Ranconnat, Red Grenache, Redondal, Retagliadu Nieddu, Rivesaltes, Rivos Altos, Rool Grenache, Rousillon Tinto, Roussillon, Rouvaillard, Sans Pareil, Santa Maria de Alcantara, Schwarze Alicanttraube, Tai Rosso, Tentillo, Tinta, Tinta Aragoneza, Tinta Menuda, Tintella, Tintilla, Tinto, Tinto Aragon, Tinto Aragones, Tinto Basto, Tinto de Navalcarnero, Tinto Menudo, Tinto Navalcarnero, Tintore di Spagna, Tintoria, Tocai Rosso, Toccai Rosso, Toledana, Uva di Spagna, Vernaccia di Serrapetrona, Vernaccia Nera, Vernatxa
Gros Cabernet (See Trousseau Noir)					
Hermitage (See Shiraz)					
Jacquez	N	5627	Uncertain (Note: VIVC gives the confirmed parentage as Aestivalis x Vitis vinifera subsp. Vinifera Linné but does not provide any specific information about Aestivalis. WPG says, "It is probably a natural cross between the American species Vitis aestivalis and Vitis cinerea, and possibly an unknown European Vitis vinifera." As WPG goes on to say, the full botanical name of Vitis aestivalis is "Vitis aestivalis Michx." (which means it could be the equivalent of VIVC's listings for Vitis aestivalis Michaux var. Aestivalis or V. a. M. var. Bicolor whose synonym is Northern Aestivalis.) Research into the parentage of Jacquez is summarised by Jerónimo Rodrigues in a paper entitled "A view into the grapevine history of Jacquez and its connection to the Madeira Islands – Vitis vinifera cv. Cabernet franc is a possible parent of Jacquez." While he concludes by expressing doubt that the full story may never be fully known (p. 8), analyses of the varieties genotype makeup have led him to think that "Jacquez contains only a 25% contribution from Vitis aestivalis, while the remainder (75%) is either totally Vitis vinifera or Vitis vinifera plus a contribution from another source, for example, V. vinifera ssp. sylvestris or the much-touted Vitis cinerea." (p. 6.) The source of V. vinifera - Cabernet Franc, as some American literature seems to be saying - he regards as a moot point, much affected by establishing what form of V. vinifera was introduced into the North American continent early enough to have crossed with V. aestivalis leading to the appearance of Jacquez in Georgia or South Carolina by the early- to mid-18th century (p. 6), and in time for its transmission to Madeira and other parts of Europe in the late 18th century. (p. 7))	Granite Belt, Hastings River, Northern Rivers, St George, South West Queensland	Alabama, Black El Paso, Black July, Black Spanish, Blue French, Blue French Grape, Burgundy, Cigar Box, Clarence, Deveraux, El Paso, French Grape, Jack, Jacket, Jacques, Jacquet, Jaquez, July Cherry, Lenoir, Long Laliman, Lenoir, Longworth's Ohio, Mac Candless, Madeira, Segar Box, Sherry of the South, Springstein, Sumpter, Thurmond, Tintiglia, Troya, Zakez, Zsake
Lagrein	N	6666	Schiava Gentile x Teroldego	Adelaide Hills, Barossa Valley, Eden Valley, Geelong, Heathcote, King Valley, Langhorne Creek, Limestone Coast, McLaren Vale, Macedon Ranges, Mornington Peninsula, Mudgee, Murray Darling, Orange, Pyrenees, Riverland, Strathbogie Ranges, Swan Hill, Tamar Valley	Blauer Lagrein, Burgundi Lagrein, Kleinvernatsch, Lagrain, Lagrino, Lagroin, Landschwarze
Lambrusco Maestri	N	6693	Unknown	Adelaide Hills, Heathcote, Murray Darling, Swan Hill	Grappello Maestri, Lambrusco di Spagna
Lambrusco Salamino	N	6701	Unknown	Adelaide Hills, Murray Darling, Swan Hill	Lambrusco Galassi, Lambrusco di Santa Croce

== M–R ==
Grape	Color of Berry Skin	VIVC Variety No	Pedigree	Location - growers and makers	International homonyms and synonyms
Malbec	N	As Côt = 2889	Magdeleine noire des Charentes x Prunelard	Albany, Barossa Valley, Beechworth, Bendigo, Blackwood Valley, Canberra, Clare Valley, Denmark, Frankland River, Geelong, Geographe, Gippsland, Goulburn Valley, Granite Belt, Great Southern, Heathcote, Hunter Valley, Kangaroo Island, Langhorne Creek, Limestone Coast, McLaren Vale, Macedon Ranges, Margaret River, Mudgee, Murray Darling, Padthaway, Peel, Pemberton, Perth Hills, Pyrenees, Queensland Zone, Southern Highlands, Swan District, Swan Hill, Swan Valley, Tamar Valley, Yarra Valley	Aggress, Agreste, Aneroir, Ausseres, Auxerrais, Auxerrois, Auxerrois de Laquenexy, Auxerrois de Moins de Picpus, Auxerrois du Mans, Auxerrois Le Fin, Balloussat, Ballouzat, Beran, Beraou, Berau, Besparo, Blanc de Kienzheim, Blanc de Keinzheim, Bordelais Noir, Boucares, Bouchalès, Bouchalles, Bouchares, Bourguignon Noir, Bouyssales, Bouyssalet, Cagors, Cahors, Calarin, Calavu, Caours, Cau, Cauly, Chalosse Petite Noire, Chaors, Chors, Claverie, Claverie Noire, Clavier, Co, Coly, Coq Rouge, Cor, Cors, Côs, Costa Rosa, Costa Rossa, Costo Roujo, Côt a Queue Rouge, Côt a Queue Verte, Côt de Bordeaux, Côt de Pays, Côt de Touraine, Côt Malbec, Cote Rouge, Cotes Rouges, Côts, Couisse, Cruchinet, Damas, Deux Seme, Doux Noir, Doux Same, Estrangey, Étaulier, Étranger, Étranger Petit, Fin Auxerrois Franc Moreau, Gôt Noir, Gourdaux, Gourdoux, Grand Vesparo, Grande Parde, Grappe Rouge, Grelot de Tour, Grelot de Tours, Griffarin, Grifforin, Gros Auxerrois, Gros Noir, Gros Pied Rouge, Gros Pied Rouge Merille, Grosse Merille, Guillan, Hourcat, Jacobain, Jacobin, Jacobin Blauer, Jacobin Noir, Kot, Le Côt, Lou Salabaire, Luckens, Lutkens, Magret, Magrot, Malbech, Malbeck, Malbeck Doux, Malbech Noir, Malbek, Malbett à Queue Rouge, Mançin, Margrot, Maurac, Mausat, Mauzac, Mauzain, Mauzat, Medoc, Merille, Monrame, Mourame, Mourane, Mouranne, Moussac, Moussin, Moustere, Mouzat, Moza, Navarien, Negre de Prechac, Negre Doux, Negre Prechac, Negre Prechat, Negrera, Noir de Chartres, Noir de Pressac, Noir Doux, Nuar de Presac, Nyar de Presak, Œil de Perdix, Parde, Peredy, Périgord, Petit Vesparo, Pied de Perdix, Pied Doux, Pied Noir, Pied Rouge, Pied Rouget, Piperdy, Plant d'Arles, Plants de Beraou, Plant de Meraou, Plant de Peraou, Plant de Roy, Plant du Lot, Plant dy Roi, Plant Houdée, Plant Rouge, Prechat, Pressac, Prolongeau, Prunelat, Prunieral, Quercy, Queue Rouge, Quille de Coq, Quillot, Raisin de Co, Romieu, Saint-Émilion, Saint-Hilaire, Soumansigne, Teinturier, Teinturin, Terranis, Tinturin, Tinturin de la Libarde, Vesparo
Malian	Rs	22608	A mutation of Cabernet Sauvignon	Langhorne Creek	
Mammolo	N	As Mammolo Peccioli - 26350	Uncertain (Note: With VIVC's only listing under Mammolo being M. Peccioli, no indication of parentage is given. WPG gives the parentage as Boggione Rosso x Uva delle Vecchie)	Barossa Valley, Canberra, Clare Valley, Gippsland, Heathcote	Broumes, Broumest, Duraguzza, Malvasia Montanaccio, Mammola, Mammoli, Mammolo Asciutta, Mammolo Fiorentino, Mammolo di Montepulciano, Mammolone di Lucca, Mammolo Grosso, Mammolo Minuto, Mammolo Nero, Mammolo Normale, Mammolo Peccioli, Mammolo Piccola Rosso Nero, Mammolo Piccolo, Mammolo Pratese, Mammolo Pratese, Mammolo Tates Mammolo Serrato, Mammolo Sgrigliolante, Mammolo Tondo, Mammolo Toscano, Muntanaccia, Muntanaccio, Muntanacciu, Schiorello, Schiuchitajolo, Sciaccarello, Sciaccarello Nero, Sciaccarellu
Marzemino	N	7463	Marzemina Bianca x Refosco dal Peduncolo Rosso (Note: This parentage is provided by WPG. VIVC does not provide any information about parentage.)	Alpine Valleys, King Valley, Murray Darling	Balsamina, Barzemin, Berzamino, Marzemina Cenerenta, Marzemina di Napoli, Marzemina Nera, Marzemina Veronese, Marzemino d'Isera, Marzemino d'Istria, Marzemino del Tirolo, Marzemino della Terra Ferma Veneta, Marzemino Nero, Marzemino Nero
Mataró (See Mourvèdre)					
Mazuelo	N	As Carignan Noir - 2098	Unknown	Barossa Valley, Langhorne Creek, McLaren Vale, Margaret River, Riverland	Axina de Spagna, Babonenc, Babounenc, Blaue Shopatna, Blaue Sopatna, Blauer Carignan, Blauer Carignant, Boi Dur, Bois du Fer, Bois Dur, Bois Dur, Bois Dure, Bova Murru, Bovale, Bovale di Spagna, Bovale Grande, Bovale Grande di Spagna, Bovale Grosso, Bovale Mannu, Bovale Murru, Bovali Mannu, Bove Duro, Bove Duro di Signa, Bove Duro di Spagna, Cafalan, Cagnolaro, Cagnolaro Tinto, Caligan, Calignan, Carignan, Carignan Crni, Carignan Francês, Carignan Mouillan, Carignan Noir, Carignan Francis, Carignan Noir, Carignane, Carignane Mouilla, Carignane Noir, Carignane Noire, Carignane Violette, Carignanne, Carignano, Carignano di Carmignano, Carignant, Carignena, Cariñano, Carinena, Carinena Mazuela, Carinena Negra, Cariñena, Carinyena, Carinhana, Catalan, Cencibel, Ciliegiolo, Concejon, Corcejon, Crignane, Crinana, Crni, Crujillón, Crusillo, Girard, Girarde, Gragnano, Grenache du Bois, Grenache du Bois Dur, Karignan, Karinian, Karinjan, Kék Carignan, Legno Duro, Legno Duro di Portoferraio, Manuelo Tinto, Manzuela, Marocain, Mataro, Mollard, Monastrell, Monestel, Moraiola Maggiore, Mostaia, Mounestesou, Nieddera, Nudo Corto, Pinot d'Evora, Pinot Evara (Despite these synonyms, the variety is not related to the Pinot family of grapes), Plan d'Espagne, Plant d'Espagne, Plant de Ledenon, Plant de Lédenon, Pokovec, Pokovez, Quattro Rappe, Roussillonen, Samso, Samo Crusillo, Samsó (not to be confused with a different grape of the same name known as Cinsault in France), Sanso, Sopatna Blau, Tintiglia, Tintilia, Tintillosa, Tintillu, Tinterella, Tinto Mazuela, Tinto Mazuelo, Uva di Spagna, Uva di Spagne, Zinzillosa
Mencía	N	7623	Alfrocheiro x Patorra	Adelaide Hills, Barossa Valley, Clare Valley, McLaren Vale, Margaret River, Mount Benson, Orange, Pyrenees, Riverland, Upper Goulburn	De Négra, Fernão Pires Tinta, Giao, Jaén, Jaén du Dão, Jaén Galego, Jaén Galeno, Jaén Noir, Jaén Tinto, Loureiro Tinto, Medoc, Mencía Pajaral, Mencía Pequeno, Mencin, Négra, Négro, Tinta Mollar, Tinta Mencía, Tinto Mollar
Meunier (See Pinot Meunier					
Merlot	N	As Merlot Noir - 7657	Cabernet Franc x Magdeleine noire des Charentes	Adelaide Hills, Albany, Barossa Valley, Blackwood Valley, Coonawarra, Cowra, Denmark, Derwent Valley, Eden Valley, Frankland River, Geographe, Gold Coast Hinterland, Goulburn Valley, Granite Belt, Hastings River, Heathcote, Hunter Valley, Kangaroo Island, McLaren Vale, Manjimup, Margaret River, Mount Barker, Mount Benson, Murray Darling, Orange, Peel, Pemberton, Perth Hills, Pemberton, Perth Hills, Pyrenees, Riverina, Riverland, South Burnett, Swan District, Swan Hill, Upper Goulburn, Wrattonbully, Yarra Valley	Alicante, Alicante Noir, Bégney, Bidal, Bidalhe, Bigney, Bigney Rouge, Bini, Bini Ruzh, Bioney, Black Alicante, Bordeleza Belcha, Bordeleze Belcha, Cabernet del Cleto, Crabutet, Crabutet Noir, Crabutet Noir Merlau, Ferjansckova, Hebigney, Higney, Higney Rouge, Lambrusco Munari, Langon, Lecchumski, Medoc Noir, Merlau, Merlau Rouge, Merlaud, Merlaut, Merlaut Noir, Merle, Merle Petite, Merleau, Merlô, Merlot Black, Merlot Blauer, Merlot Crni, Merlot Nero, Merlott, Merlou, Odžaleši, Odzhaleshi, Odzhaleshi Legkhumskii, Petit Merle, Picard, Pikard, Plan Medre, Planet Medok, Plant du Medoc, Plant Medoc, Saint Macaire, Sème de la Canau, Sème dou Flube, Semilhon Rouge, Semilhoum Rouge, Semilhoun Rouge, Memillon Rouge, Sud des Graves, Vidal, Vini Ticinesi, Vitrai, Vitraille
Monastrell (See Mourvèdre)					
Mondeuse Noire	N	7921	Mondeuse Blanche x Tressot Noir	Canberra, Currency Creek, Geelong, Geographe, Granite Belt, King Valley, McLaren Vale, Mornington Peninsula, Mudgee, Murray Darling, Rutherglen, Swan Hill	Angelique, Argillet, Argillière, Begeain, Begean, Bon Savoyan, Chétouan, Chétuan, Chintuan, Cintuan, Côtillon des Dames, Gascon, Grand Chétuan, Grand Picot, Grand Picou, Gros Chétuan, Gros Picot, Gros Piquot, Gros Plant, Gros Rouge, Gros Rouge du Pays, Grosse Sirah, Grosse Sirrah, Grosse Syrah, Gueyne, Guyenne, La Dame, Languedoc, Largillet, Maldoux, Mandos, Mandouse, Mandoux, Mandouze, Mantouse, Margilien, Margilieux, Margillien, Margillin, Marlanche Noire, Marsanne Noire, Marvé, Maudos, Maudoux, Meximieux, Molette, Molette Noire, Mondeuse, Mondeuse Nera, Mondeuse Rouge, Monteuse, Montouse, Morlanche, Morlanche Noire, Moutouse, Parcense, Persagne, Persaigne, Persance, Persanne, Petite Persaigne, Pinot Vache, Plant de Savoie, Plant Maldoux, Plant Mandos, Plant Maudos, Plant Médoc, Plant Modo, Plant Modol, Plant Noir, Prossaigne, Refosco, Rodó, Rouget, Salanaise, Savoe, Savoete, Savouai, Savouette, Savoyan, Savoyanche, Savoyange, Savoyanne, Savoyant, Savoyard, Savoyen, Savoyet, Syrah Grosse, Terran, Terrano, Tinto do Rodó, Tinto Rodó, Tornarin, Tournarin, Tournerin, Vache
Montepulciano	N	7949	Unknown	Adelaide Hills, Adelaide Plains, Alpine Valleys, Barossa Valley, Clare Valley, Coonawarra, Currency Creek, Eden Valley, Granite Belt, Heathcote, Hunter Valley, King Valley, Langhorne Creek, McLaren Vale, Mount Benson, Mudgee, Murray Darling, Orange, Perth Hills, Pyrenees, Queensland Zone, Riverina, Riverland, Rutherglen, Shoalhaven Coast, South Burnett, South Coast Zone, Southern Fleurieu, Riverina, Riverland	Africano, Angolano, Cordiscio, Cordisco, Cordisio, Montepulciano, Montepulciano Cordesco, Montepulciano Cordisco, Montepulciano Crni, Montepulciano d'Abruzzo, Montepulciano di Torre de Passeri, Montepulciano Primatico, Montepulciano Spargolo, Morellone, Premutico, Primaticcio, Primitivo, Primutico, Pugnitello, S. Giovese, Sangiovese Cardisco, Sangiovese Cordisco, Sangiovetto, Torre dei Passeri, Uva Abruzzese, Uva Abruzzi, Violone
Mourvèdre	N	As Monastrell - 7915	Unknown	Albany, Barossa Valley, Clare Valley, Cowra, Eden Valley, Frankland River, Granite Belt, Heathcote, Limestone Coast, McLaren Vale, Nagambie Lakes, Pemberton, Perricoota, Riverina, Riverland, South Burnett	Alcallata, Alcayata, Alicante, Arach Sap, Balsac, Balthazar, Balzac, Balzac Noir, Balzar, Beausset, Benada, Benadu, Beni Carlo, Berardi, Bod, Bon Avis, Bonavis, Buona Vise, Casca, Catalan, Cayata, Caymilari Sarda, Charmet, Charnet, Churret, Clairette Noir, Clairette Noire, Damas Noir, De Reyno, Del Reino, Del Reyno, Drug, English Colossal, Espagne, Espagnen, Espar, Esparte, Estrangle-chien, Estranglechien, Etrangle Chien, Etranglechien, Flouron, Flourous, Flouroux, Garruch, Garrut, Garruts, Gayata, Gayata Tinta, Giro Alacant, Gros Mourvède, Kaldaretta, Karis, Macalu, Mando, Manéchal, Maneschaou, Marseillais, Mataro*, Matterou, Maurostel, Mechin, Merle d'Espsgne, Molverde, Molverdes, Monastel, Monastre, Monastrel, Monastrell*, Monastrell Garrut, Monastrell Menudo, Monastrell Verdadero, Monistrellen, Morastell, Morrastel, Morrastrell, Morrstel, Morvède, Morves, Mourvède, Mourvedon, Mourvèdre Mataro, Mataro Près, Mourvégué, Mourvèdre Famellestadt, Mourvégué, Mourves, Mourvézé, Mourvièdre, Mouvedre Famellestadt, Murvedr Espar, Murvedro, Murviedro, Murviedro, Négré, Négré Trinchiera, Négrette, Négria, Négron, Neyron, Piémontais, Pinot Fléri, Plant de Ledenon, Plant de Saint-Gilles, Plant de St. Grilles, Plant de Verre, Reina, Ros, Rossola Nera, Rossolo Nera, Spar, Tinta, Tintilla, Tintillo, Tintillo de Luxar, Tinto, Tire-droit, Torrontes, Trinchiera, Uva Tinta, Valcarcelia, Verema, Veremeta, Vereneta (*Mataro and Monastrell are this variety's other common names)
Muscardin	N	8184	Unknown	McLaren Vale	Bests T, Muscardin Noir, Muscardine
Muscat Hamburg (See Black Muscat)					
Muscat à Petits Grains Rouge	Rg	8248	A mutation of Muscat à Petits Grains Blanc	Barossa Valley, Clare Valley, Geographe, (Note: This sub-regions website lists the grape as "Muscat à Petits Grains Rosa", which probably means the variety is Muscat à Petits Grains Rose.) Granite Belt, Heathcote, King Valley, McLaren Vale, Mornington Peninsula, Mudgee, Orange, Riverina, Riverland, Southern Highlands, Swan Valley	Apiana Moschata, Brauner Muskateller, Brown Frontignac, Brown Muscat, Busuioacă, Busuioacă de Bohotin, Busuioacă di Bohotin, Busuioacă Roza, Busuioacă Vanata, Busuioacă Vanata de Bohotin, Cehrayi Muskat, Cervena Dincha, Cervena Dinka, Gordo, Grauer Muskateller, Grauroter Muskateller, Grizeline, Grizzly Frontignac, Grizzly Frontignan, Gros Muscat Violet, Kümmeltraube, Madère, Montepulciano, Moscadello Rosso, Moscado Rosso, Muscatel Gordomorado, Moscatel de Grano Menudo Rojo, Moscatel Galego Roxo, Moscatel Gordomorado, Moscatel Menudo, Moscatel Menudo Morado, Moscatel Rojo, Moscatel Roxo, Moscatella Rubra, Moscato Rosato, Moscato Rosso, Moscato Rosso de Madera, Moscato Violetto, Moscha Aromatica, Moscodel Menudo Morado, Muscat à Petits Grains Rouges, Muscat Brun, Muscat Corail, Muscat d’Alsace Rouge, Muscat d'Alexandrie, Muscat de Corail, Muscat Frontignan Rouge, Muscat Gris, Muscat of Alexandria, Muscat Rouge, Muscat Rouge à Petits Grains, Muscat Rouge de Frontignan, Muscat Frontignon, Muscat Frontinyanskiy, Muscat Gris, Muscat Piemont, Muscat Pink, Muscat Red, Muscat Rouge, Muscat Rouge à Petits Grains, Muscat Rouge de Frontignac, Muscat Rouge de Frontignan, Muscat Rouge de Madeira, Muscat Rozovy, Muscat Violet, Muscat Violet Commun, Muscat Violet Cyperus, Muscat Violet de Madère, Muscatella Rubra, Muscateller Rot, Muscateller Violet, Muskat Frontinyanskii, Muskat Frontinyanskiy, Muskat Kalyaba, Muskat Krasnyi, Muskat Krasnyj, Muskat Rozovyi, Muskat Rozovyj, Muskat Violetovii, Muskateller Grau, Muskateller Rot, Muskateller Roter, Muskateller Schwarzblau, Muskateller Violett, Piros Muskotally, Qirmizi Muskat, Red Constantia, Red Frontignac, Red Frontignan, Red Muscadel, Red Muscat, Red Muskadel, Roter Frontignac, Roter Muskateller, Rothe Schmeckende, Rothe Schmeckete, Rother Frontignac, Rother Muscateller, Rother Spanischer Muskateller, Rother Weirauch, Rother Meirauch, Rothmuscateller, Schmeckende, Schmeckende Roth, Schmeckete, Tafeltraube Fleischmann, Tămâioasă de Bohotin, Tămâioasă de Bohotin, Tămâioasă Violeta, Uva Turca Rubra, Violetter Muskateller, Weihrauch Roth, Wohlschmeckende Bisamrebe
Mystique	N	26727	Merbein MI 89-33-23. x Dunkelfelder	Swan Hill,	MD 01-3-45
Nebbiolo	N	8417	Unknown	Adelaide Hills, Adelaide Plains, Alpine Valleys, Beechworth, Bendigo, Canberra, Central Ranges, Clare Valley, Eden Valley, Geelong, Geographe, Gippsland, Grampians, Granite Belt, Gundagai, Hastings River, Heathcote, Hilltops, Hunter Valley, Kangaroo Island, King Valley, Langhorne Creek, McLaren Vale, Macedon Ranges, Margaret River, Mornington Peninsula, Mudgee, Murray Darling, Orange, Peel, Perth Hills, Porongurup, Port Phillip Zone, Pyrenees, Shoalhaven Coast, South Burnett, Southern Highlands, Sunbury, Swan District, Swan Hill, Swan Valley, Tasmania North West, Tumbarumba, Upper Goulburn, Western Plains, Wrattonbully, Yarra Valley	Antournerein, Barbesino, Barolo, Brunenta, Bruneta, Chiavennasca, Chiavennasca di Valtellina, Farinella, Femmina, Lampia, Marchesana, Martesana, Melasca, Melaschetto, Melascone, Michet, Monferrina, Morsano di Caraglio, Nebbieul Grosso, Nebbieul Maschio, Nebbiola, Nebbiolin, Nebbiolin Canavesano, Nebbiolin Comùne, Nebbiolin Lungo, Nebbiolin Nero, ru:Неббиоло, Nebbiolo Canavesano, Nebbiolo Comùne, Nebbiolo Crni, Nebbiolo d'Antom, Nebbiolo d'Asti, Nebbiolo d'Ivrea, Nebbiolo del Bolla, Nebbiolo di Barbaresco, Nebbiolo di Barolo, Nebbiolo di Beltram, Nebbiolo di Bricherasio, Nebbiolo di Camione, Nebbiolo di Carema, Nebbiolo di Dronero, Nebbiolo di Ivrea, Nebbiolo di Lorenze, Nebbiolo di Lorenzi, Nebbiolo do Masio, Nebbiolo di Moncrivello, Nebbiolo di Monsordo, Nebbiolo di Nizza, Nebbiolo di Nizza della Paglia, Nebbiolo di Piemonte, Nebbiolo di Sciolze, Nebbiolo di Sinistra Tanaro, Nebbiolo di Stroppo, Nebbiolo Femmina, Nebbiolo Lampia, Nebbiolo Lungo, Nebbiolo Maschio, Nebbiolo Michet, Nebbiolo Nero, Nebbiolo Occellino, Nebbiolo Pajrole, Nebbiolo Picotendre, Nebbiolo Pignolato, Nebbiolo Pirule, Nebbiolo Sinistra Tanaro, Nebieu, Nebieul, Nebieul Fumela, Nebiolo, Nebiolo du Piemont, Nibbiolo, Nibieul Burghin, Nibio, Nibiol, Nubiola, Nubiolum, Pantiner, Picotender, Picotendre, Picotendro, Picotener, Picotenero, Picotiner, Picoutendro Maschio, Picoutener, Pioultener, Poctener, Pruenent, Prugnent, Pruine, Prunena, Prunent, Prunenta, Prunento, Pugnet, Rose, Rosetta, Spagna, Span, Spana, Spana Commùne, Spana Grossa, Spana Piccola, Spanin, Spanna, Spanna a Gattinara, Spanna di Gattinara, Spanna Grossa, Spano, Tandis, Uva Spana
Negramoll (See Tinta Negra Mole)					
Negroamaro	N	As Negro Amaro - 8456	Unknown	Adelaide Hills, Barossa Valley, Currency Creek, Eden Valley, Geelong, Heathcote, Hunter Valley, McLaren Vale, Macedon Ranges, Mudgee, Riverland	Abbruzzese, Albese, Jonico, Lacrima, Negro Amaro, Nigroamaro, Purcinara, Uva Olivella
Nero d'Avola	N	4222	Unknown	Adelaide Hills, Alpine Valleys, Barossa Valley, Beechworth, Clare Valley, Coonawarra, Geographe, Glenrowan, Granite Belt, Greater Perth, Heathcote, King Valley, Langhorne Creek, McLaren Vale, Macedon Ranges, Murray Darling, Nagambie Lakes, North East Victoria, Perth Hills, Pyrenees, Riverina, Riverland, Swan Hill, Yarra Valley	Calabrese (The second main name), Calabrese d'Avola, Calabrese de Calabria, Calabrese di Vittoria, Calabrese Dolce, Niureddu Calavrisi, Strugeri de Calabria, Uva de Calabria
Norton	N	8599	Cynthiana x Vitis vinifera subsp. Vinifera Linné	Hastings River	Arkansas, Cynthiana, Norton's Seedling, Norton's Virginia Seedling, Norton Virginia, Red River, Virginia, Virginia Seddling, Vitis Nortoni
Nero di Troia	N	As Uva di Troia - 12819	Bombino Bianco x Quagliano	Rutherglen	Cassano, Somarello, Sommarrello, Sumarello, Summariello, Tranese, Troiano, Troja, Trojana, Uva Antica Nara, Uva della Marina, Uva di Barletta, Uva di Canosa, Uva di Troia (second main name), Uva di Troya
181 (See Merlot)			A clone of Merlot		
Parraleta (See Bonvedro)					
Pavana	N	9057	Unknown	Heathcote	Nera Gentile di Fonzano, Nostrana Nera, Pavana Nera, Pelosetta, Ussulara, Visentina
Petit Verdot	N	As Verdot Petit - 12974	Unknown	Adelaide Hills, Adelaide Plains, Barossa Valley, Beechworth, Bendigo, Canberra, Coonawarra, Cowra, Currency Creek, Eden Valley, Frankland River, Geographe, Gippsland, Glenrowan, Goulburn Valley, Granite Belt, Heathcote, Hilltops, Kangaroo Island, King Valley, Langhorne Creek, Limestone Coast, McLaren Vale, Margaret River, Mudgee, Murray Darling, North East Victoria, Northern Slopes, Peel, Pemberton, Perricoota, Perth Hills, Porongurup, Pyrenees, Riverina, Riverland, Rutherglen, South Burnett, South Coast, Southern Flinders Ranges, Southern Highlands, Swan District, Swan Hill, Swan Valley, Tamar Valley, Western Plains, Yarra Valley	Bonton Blanc, Bouton, Carmelin, Heran, Herrant, Lambrusquet, Lambrusquet Noir, Peti Verdo, Petit Verdau, Petit Verdot, Petit Verdot Nero, Petit Verdot Noir, Plant de Palus, Plant de Paulus, Verdau, Verdot, Verdot Rouge
Pinot Meunier	N	9278	A mutation of Pinot Noir	Barossa Valley, Bendigo, Grampians, Henty, Hilltops, Hunter Valley, Huon/Channel, Macedon Ranges, Mornington Peninsula, King Valley, Southern Highlands, Swan Valley, Tamar Valley, Tasmania East Coast, Tasmania North East Yarra Valley	Auvernat Gris, Auvernat Meunier, Black Riesling, Blanche Feuille, Blue Müllertraube, Carpinet, Dusty Miller, Farineux Noir, Fresillon, Fromenté, Gris Meunier, Meunier, Meunier Gris, Miller's Burgundy, Miller's Grape, Molnar Szölö, Molnar Toke, Molnar Toke Kék, Morillon Taconné, Morone Farinaccio, Müllerrebe, Müllertraube, Müllerweib, Noirien de Vuillapans, Noirin Enfarine, Pinot Negro, Pinot Nero, Plant de Brie, Postitschtraube, Rana Modra Mlinaria, Rana Modra Mlinarica, Rana Modra Molinaria, Schwarzblaue Müllerrebe, Schwarzriesling, Trézillon, Wrotham Pinot
Pinot Noir	N	9279	Savagnin Blanc x ?	Adelaide Hills, Albany, Ballarat, Central WA, Coal River Valley, Denmark, Derwent Valley, Frankland River, Geelong, Gippsland, Henty, McLaren Vale, Macedon Ranges, Manjimup, Mount Benson, Mornington Peninsula, Mount Barker, Murray Darling, Pemberton, Perth Hills, Porongurup, Riverina, Riverland, Southern Highlands, Swan Hill, Swan District, Tamar Valley, Tasmania East Coast, Tasmania North East, Yarra Valley	Aprofekete, Arbst, Arbst Blau, Arbst Blauer, Assmannshäuser, Augustiner, Augustinier, Auvergnat, Auvergnat Nero, Auvergne, Auvernas, Auvernas Rouge, Auvernat, Auvernat Noir, Auvernat Teint Noir, Berligout, Black Burgundy, Black Cluster, Black Morillon, Blak Burgundy, Blau Boden See Traub, Blau Burgunder, Blauburgunder, Blauer, Blauer Arbst, Blauer Augustiner, Blauer Burgunder, Blauer Clävner, Blauer Clevner, Blauer Klävner, Blauer Kläver, Blauer Klevner, Blauer Klewner, Blauer Nürnberg, Blauer Nürnberger, BlauerRischling, Blauer Seeklevner, Blauer Seeklvner, Blauer Spätburgunder, Blauer Sylvaner, Blaurer Statburgunder, Bodenseetraube, Böhmischer, Bon Plant, Borgogna Nera, Borgogna Rosse, Bourgignon, Bourgignon Noir, Bourgoignon Noir, Bourguignon, Bourguignon Gros, Bourguignon Noir, Bourguignon Petit, Bruenlaeubler, Burgunda, Burgundac Cernii, Burgundac Crni, Burgundac Crni Pozni, Burgunder, Burgunder Blau, Burgunder Blauer, Burgunder Grosse Blaue, Burgunder Kleine Blaue, Burgunder Roter, Burgunder Schwarz, Burgundi Crni, Burgundi Kék Apio, Burgundi Kék Apro, Burgundi Kék Aproszemue, Burgundi Mic, Burgundske Modre, Burgundy, Cerna, Cerna Okrugla, Cerna Okrugata Banka, Cerna Ranka, Chambertin, Champagner, Cherna, Chiavenase, Chiavenna, Chpatchok, Clävner, Clävner Blau, Clävner Schwarz, Clavensis, Clevner, Clevner Mariafeld, Cluster, Coraillod, Cortaillod, Corton, Czerna Okrugla Rauka, Derice Auvernas Noir, Dickblau, Early Black, Echter Schwarzblauer Klevner, Elsasser Rot, Elsasser Rother, Fekete Cilifaut, Fin Noir, Fin Noir de Toulon, Fin Plant Doré, Formentin Noir, Fränkische Schwarze, Franc Noiren, Franc Noirien, Franc Pineau, Franc Pinot, François Noir, Frischschwarzer, Frühblaue, Frühblauer, Frühschwarzer, Fruhblauer, Gamais, Gamay Beaujolais, Genetin de St Menin, Gentil Noir, Glävinger, Glasschwarz, Grauer Burgunder, Gribalet Noir, Grobes Süsschwarz, Grosse Burgunder, Grosse Frühschwarse, Grosse Burgunder, Gut Blau, Gutblau, Hohmann 28/95/46/4+5, Jakabscoeloe, Karapino, Kék Burgundi, Kék Kisburgundi, Kék Klevner, Kék Rulandi, Kis Burgundi, Kis Burgundikek, Kisburgundi, Kisburgundi Kék, Klävner, Klävner Schwarz, Klebrot, Klebroth, Klebrott, Kleine Burgunder, Kleiner Burgunder, Kleinrot, Kleinroth, Klevinger, Klevner, Klevner Kék, Klevner Schwarzblau, Kocinka, Korai Kekburgundi, Langedet, Mährchen, Malterdinger, Maltertinger, Mario Feld, Marillon N, Massouquet, Massoutel, Massoutet, Maurillon, Maurillon de Bourgogne, Mensois, Modra Burgunda, Modra Klevanja, Modra Klevanjka, Modra Klevanyka, Modri Pinot, Möhrchen, Möhrchen Blaues, Möhrlein, Mohrenkönigin, Mohrenkönigin Frühblaue, Mor Burgunder, Moreote Noir, Moreotische Traube, Morillon, Morillon Noir, Mourillon, Nagy Burgundi, Nagyburgundi, Nera, Nere, Neyran, Neyron Petit, Noble, Noble Joué, Noir de Franconie, Noir de Franconier, Noir de Versitch, Noiren, Noir Menu, Noir Meun, Noiried, Noirien, Noirien Franc, Noirien Ternent, Noirin, Noirun, Okrugla Ranka, Ordinärer Blauer, Ordinärer Rother, Orleanais, Orleans, Petit Bourguignon, Petit Noir, Petit Noirin, Petit Plant Doré, Petit Verot, Petite Lyonnaise, Pignol, Pignola, Pignolet, Pignoliga, Pignolo, Pignolus, Pignuola, Pimbart, Pineau, Pineau de Bourgogne, Pineau de Bourgoyne, Pineau de Chambertin, Pineau de Gevrey, Pineau Franc, Pineau Noir, Pino Black, Pino Ceren, Pino Cernii, Pino Cheren, Pino Chernyi, Pino Chernyj, Pino Corni, Pino Cornij, Pino Fran, Pino Go, Pino Negru, Pino Nero, Pino Nuar, Pino Qo, Pinot, Pinot Bianco, Pinot Cernii, Pinot Clevner Cl. Maria-Feld, Pinot Crni, Pinot d'Ay, Pinot de Bourgogne, Pinot de Chambertin, Pinot de Fleury, Pinot de Gevrey, Pinot de Migraine, Pinot de Ribeauvillers, Pinot de Volnay, Pinot de Vougeot, Pinot Droit, Pinot Fin, Pinot Franc Noir, Pinot Grigio, Pinot Liebault, Pinot Maré, Pinot Mariafeld, Pinot Negru, Pinot Nera, Pinot Nero, Pinot Noar, Pinot Noir Cortaillod, Pinot Noir Cortaillod 9–18, Pinot Noir Salvagnin, Pinot Salvagnin, Pinot Tinto, Plack Morillon, Plant á Bon Vin, Plant Dae, Plant de Cumière, Plant de Cumières, Plant de la Dole Noir, Plant de S. Martin, Plant Doré, Plant Fin, Plant Medaille, Plant Noble, Précoce de Ribeauvilliers, Pynoz, Qara Pino, Raisin de Bourgogne, Rauci Velke, Raucj, Raucy, Raucy Male, Rauka Druge Struke, Roter Aßmannhäuser, Roter Aßmannshäuser, Roter Burgunder, Roter Burgunder, Rother, Rother Aßmannshäuser, Rother Burgunder, Rouci, Rouci Male, Rouci Modre, Roucimodre, Rouget, Rulandske Modre, Sachemo, Salvagnin, Salvagnin Noir, Samoireau, Samoreau, Samtrot, Saumensois, Saumoireau, Savagin Noir, Savagnin Noir, Schnetzler, Schurzir Riesling, Schwartz Klevner, Schwarz Träuble, Schwarzblauer Klevner, Schwarze Fränkische, Schwarzer, Schwarzer Aßmannshäuser, Schwarzer Burgunder, Schwarzer Champagner, Schwarzer Klävner, Schwarzer Klevner, Schwarzer Riesling, Schwarzer Rissling, Schwarzer Süßling, Schwarzer Tokayer, Schwarzklävner, Schwarzklevner, Schwarzträuble, Servagnier, Servagnin, Servagnin Noir de Seyssel, Sevagnin Noir, Shpachock, Shpachok, Shpetburgunder, Spacok, Spätburgunder, Spätburgunder Blauer, Später Burgunder, Spätes Möhrchen, Spätes Mörchen, Spatburgunder, Spetburgunder, Stolle 514, Süßblau, Süßedel, Süßling, Süßrot, Süßroth, Süßschwarz, Süßschwarzer, Sußchwarzer, Süßschwarz Grober, Talvagnere Rouge, Talvagnüs Rouges, Ternent, Thalrother, Tinto, Traminer Blau, Traminer Schwarz, True Burgundy, Vert Doré, Vrai Auvernas, Waltertinger, Weißburgunder, Zuncic
Pinotage	N	9286	Pinot Noir x Cinsault	Alpine Valleys, Coonawarra, Geographe, Granite Belt, New England, Riverland, Yarra Valley	Perold's Hermitage x Pinot
Primitivo (See Tribidrag)					
Q45 (See Merlot)		A clone of Merlotref name="Merlot" />			
Red Veltliner (See Roter Veltliner)					
Refosco dal Peduncolo Rosso	N	9987	Marzemino x ?	Bendigo, Heathcote	Peteljcice, Refosco, Refosco dal Pecòl Rosso, Refosco Nostrano, Refosco Peduncolo Rosso, Refosk, Rifòsc, Rifòsc dal Pecòl Ròss, Rifosco and Teran Crvene, Teran Crvene Peteljcice
Rondinella	N	10189	Corvina Veronese x ?	Hilltops	Corvina, Nessuno Conosciuto
Roriz (See Tempranillo)					
Roter Veltliner	Rg	As Veltliner Rot - 12931	Unknown	Yarra Valley	Ariavina, Ariavina Männliche, Bakor, Belo Ocka, Belo Oka, Buzyn, Cerveny Muskatel, Crvena Valtelina, Crvena Valtelinka, Csucsos Bakor, Debela Ariavina, Dreimänner, Erdezha, Erdezha Shopatna, Erdezka Rabolina, Fedleiner, Feldleiner, Feldleiner Rothlichter, Feldliner, Feldlinger, Feltliner, Fleisch Roter Velteliner, Fleisch Roter Wälteliner, Fleisch Traminer, Fleischroter Traminer, Fleischrother Velteliner, Fleischrother Veltliner, Fleischtraminer, Fleischtraube, Fleischtraube Rot, Fleischweiner, Grosbrauner Velteliner, Grossbrauner, Grosse Fleischtraube, Grosser Fleischtraube, Grosser Roter Veltliner, Grosser Rother Välteliner, Grosser Rother Veltliner, Grosser Traminer, Grosser Välteliner, Grosser Velteliner, Grosswiener, Herera Rhaetica, Herera Valtellina, Kecskecsecs, Krdeca, Männliche Ariavina, Mannliche, Maucnjk, Mavcnik, Mavenick, Mavenik, Moseavina, Moslavina, Muscateller, Muskatel Cerveny, Nagy Veltelini, Nagysagos, Nyulsölö, Nyulszölö, Piros Veltelini, Pirosveltelin, Pirosveltelini, Rabolina, Raifler, Raisin de Saint Valentin, Ranfler, Ranfolica, Ranfolina, Ranfoliza, Raufler, Raufolica, Rebalina, Rebolina, Red Veltliner, Reifler, Rhaetica, Riegersburger Rothköpfel, Riegersburger Rothtöpfel, Rivola Tchervena, Rossera, Rossola, Rote Fleisch Traube, Rote Fleischtraube, Rote Fleischtrauble, Roter, Roter Muskateller, Roter Riesling, Roter Välteliner, Roter Velteliner, Roter Veltiner, Roter Veltliner, Rotgipfler, Rothe Shopatna, Rothe Shopotna, Rothe Velteliner, Rother Fleischtraube, Rother Muscateller, Rother Raifler, Rother Riesling, Rother Välteliner, Rother Velteliner, Rother Veltliner, Rother Zierfahnler, Rothgipfler, Rothlichter, Rothreifler, Rotmehlweisser, Rotmuskateller, Rotreifler, Rudeca, Ryvola Cervena, Ryvola Crvena, Saint Valentin Rose, Saint Valentinrose, Shopatna, Shopotna, Somsölö, Spaete Ranfoliza, St. Valentin, Tarant Cerveny, Tarant Rot, Todtraeger Rotreifler, Traminer, Uva di Saint Valentini, Uva di Saint Valentino, Valentin, Valentin Rouge, Välteliner, Välteliner Roter, Valtelin Rouge, Valteliner, Vältliner, Valteliner Rosso, Valteliner Rouge, Valteliner Tardif, Veltelin Piros, Veltelin Rosso, Velteline Rouge, Velteliner, Velteliner Rose, Velteliner Roso, Velteliner Roter, Velteliner Rother, Velteliner Rouge, Veltelini Piros, Veltlinac Crveni, Veltliner, Veltliner Rosso, Veltliner Rot Weiss, Veltliner Roth, Veltliner Rother, Veltliner Rouge, Veltlini Piros, Veltlinske Cervene, Veltlinski Rozovii, Veltlinskii Rozovii, Veltlinsky Rosovy, Vernyeges Veltelini, Verrnyeges Veltelini, Weisser Raifler, Weissholzige Ribula Maucnjk, Ziegelroth
Rubienne	N	22336	Sumoll x Cabernet Sauvignon	Coonawarra, Murray Darling, Pyrenees	
Rubired	N	10308	Alicante Ganzin x Tinto Cão or Tinta Cão	Riverland	California S 8, Ruby Red
Ruby Cabernet	N	10313	Carignan Noir = Mazuelo x Cabernet Sauvignon	Barossa Valley, Blackwood Valley, Gippsland, Goulburn Valley, Hunter Valley, McLaren Vale, Macedon Ranges, Margaret River, Murray Darling, Queensland Zone, Riverina, Riverland, Rutherglen, Shoalhaven Coast, Swan Hill	Cabernet Ruby, California 234 F2, Roubi Cabernet, Rubi Kaberne

== S–Z ==
Grape	Color of Berry Skin	VIVC Variety No	Pedigree	Location - growers and makers	International homonyms and synonyms	
Sagrantino	N	10457	Unknown	Adelaide Hills, Barossa Valley, Beechworth, Canberra, Eden Valley, Geelong, Granite Belt, Heathcote, King Valley, McLaren Vale, Murray Darling, Orange, Perth Hills, Swan Hill, Upper Goulburn	Sagrantino Rosso, Sagrantino di Montefalco	
Saint Laurent	N	10470	Pinot Noir x ?	Adelaide Hills	Blauer Saint Laurent, Chvartser, Laourentstraube, Laurentzitraube, Laurenzitraube, Laurenztraube, Lorentstraube, [:ru:Лаурентраубе] Lorenztraube, Lovrecanka Crna, Lovrenac Crni, Lovricanka, Lovrijenac, Lovrijenac Crni, Magdalena Nera, Négret de Coutanceau, Pinot St. Laurent, [:ru:Пино Сен Лоран], Saint Laurent Noir, Saint Lorentz, Sankt Laurent, Sankt Lorenz Traube, Sankt Lorenztraube, Schwarze Lorenztraube, Schwarzer, [:ru:Шварце], Schwarzer Lorenztraube, Sent Laourent, Sent Lovrenka, Sentlovrenka, Shentlovrenka, S. L. Noir, S. Loerinczi, Shvartser, St. Laurent, [:ru:Сен Лоран], Svativavrinetz, Svatovavřinecké, Svätovavrinecké, [:ru: Сватовавринецке], Svätý Lorinc, Svätý Vavrinec, [:ru:Сваты Вавринец], Szent Lörinc, Szent Lörine, Szent Lörinzi, Szentlörinc, Vavrinak, Vavřinecké, Vavřiňák, [:ru:Вавринак], [:ru:Вавринецкий красный]	
Saint-Macaire	N		Unknown	Coonawarra, Riverina	Bouton Blanc, Macau, Moustère, Moustouzère	
Sangiovese	N	10680	Possibly either Frappato di Vittoria x Foglia Tonda or Gaglioppo x Foglia Tonda. According to WPG, both are doubtful.	Adelaide Hills, Adelaide Plains, Alpine Valleys, Barossa Valley, Beechworth, Bendigo, Canberra, Clare Valley, Coonawarra, Cowra, Eden Valley, Frankland River, Geelong, Geographe, Gippsland, Goulburn Valley, Grampians, Granite Belt, Gundagai, Hastings River, Heathcote, Hilltops, Hunter Valley, Kangaroo Island, King Valley, Langhorne Creek, Limestone Coast, McLaren Vale, Macedon Ranges, Manjimup, Margaret River, Mornington Peninsula, Mudgee, Murray Darling, Nagambie Lakes, Orange, Peel, Perricoota, Perth Hills, Porongurup, Pyrenees, Riverina, Riverland, Rutherglen, Shoalhaven Coast, South Burnett, Southern Fleurieu, Southern Flinders Ranges, Southern Highlands, Strathbogie Ranges, Sunbury, Swan Valley, Tumbarumba, Upper Goulburn, Yarra Valley	Agnelluccia, Agnellucciu, Brunelletto, Brunello, Brunello di Montalcino, Brunello Montalcino, Cacchiano, Calabrese, Cardisco, Cassano, Chiantino, Cordisio, Corinto, Corinto Negro, Corinto Nero, Cuocignola, Gabba Cani, Guarnacciola, Ingannacane, Lacrima, Lambrusco, Lambrusco Mendoza, Liliano, Maglioppa, Montepulciano Cardisco, Montepulciano Primaticcio, Montepulciano Primutico, Morellino, Morellino de Florence, Morellino di Scansano, Morellone, Moscatale, Moscatele, Negrello, Negretta, Nelutcho, Nerello, Nerello Campotu, Nerello Nellielluccio, Nerino, Nerino Sanvicetro, Niella, Niella Primaticcio, Niellone, Nielluccia, Nielluccio, Niellucciu, Pigniuolo Rosso, Pignolo, Pignolo Rosso, Pignuolo, Plant Romain, Primaticcio, Prugnolino Dolce, Prugnolo, Prugnolo di Montepulciano, Prugnolo Dolce, Prugnolo Gentile, Prugnolo Gentile di Montepulciano, Prugnolo Rosso, Puttanella, San Giovese dal Cannello lungo di Predoppio, San Giovese di Romagna, San Gioveto, San Gioveto Dolce Nero, San Gioveto Gentile, San Gioveto Grosso, San Gioveto Grosso di Toscana, San Montanino, San Quioveto, San Roveto, San Zoveto, Sancivetro, Sangineto, Sangiogheto, Sangiovese Crni, Sangiovese dal Cannello Lungo, Sangiovese dal Cannello Lungo di Predappio, Sangiovese di Lamole, Sangiovese di Romagna, Sangiovese Dolce, Sangiovese Elba, Sangiovese Gentile, Sangiovese Grosso, Sangiovese Nostrano, Sangiovese Piccolo, Sangiovese Piccolo Precoce, Sangiovese Romagnolo, Sangiovese Sino, Sangiovese Toscano, Sangiovete, Sangioveto, Sangioveto Chiantigiano, Sangioveto dell'Alba, Sangioveto Dolce, Sangioveto Doppio, Sangioveto Doppio del Chianti, Sangioveto Grosso, Sangioveto Montanino, Sanvicetro dal Cannello Lungo di Predappio, Sancivetro di Lamole, Sancivetro di Romagna, Sancivetro Dolce, Sancivetro Gentile, Sanxhoveze, Sanzoveto, Tabernello, Tignolo, Tignolo Sointovese, Tipsa, Toustain, Tuccanese, Uva Abruzzi, Uva Canina, Uvetta, Vigna del Conte, Vigna Maggio	
Saperavi	N		Unknown	Adelaide Hills, Alpine Valleys, Barossa Valley, Clare Valley, Granite Belt, Kangaroo Island, King Valley, McLaren Vale, Murray Darling, Riverland, Rutherglen, South Burnett	Atenuri Saperavi, Didi Saperavi, Meshketi, Meskuri Saperavi, Obchuri Saperavi, საფერავი, Saperaibi, Saperavi Crni, Saperavi de Kachet, Saperavi de Kakhetie, Saperavi Patara, Saperawi, Sapeur, Szaperavi	
Schiava Grossa (See Trollinger)						
Schioppettino	N		Vulpea x ?	Alpine Valleys, Heathcote	Pocalza, Poçalza, Pokalca, Pokalza, Ribolla Nera, Schiopetino, Schiopettino, Scoppiettino	
Schönburger	Rs	10833	Pinot Noir x Pirovano 1	Tasmania East Coast, Tasmania North West, Tasmania Southern	Falschblüher, Geisenheim 15–114, GM 15–114, Schönberger, Schönburger Rose, Schonburger	
Sémillon Rosé	Rg	A colour mutation of Sémillon	Adelaide Hills	Red Sémillon		
Shavkapito	N		Unknown	Mount Benson, Padthaway	Blauhölzer, Chaco Kapistoni, Chaco Kapistonij, Chaco Kapistonji, Chaco Kapistony, Chari Kouredzeni, Chavgabitto, Chavkapito, [:uk:Чавкапіто], [:uk:Шавкапіто], Chavi Kamouri, Chavi Kapistoni, Chavi Titu, Chavv Gobito, Chaw Kapito, Chaw Gobito, Ghaw Kapilo, Ghaw Kapito, Lurdjpotola, Lurjpotola, Sahvkapito, Savkapito, Sciavkapita, Sciavkapito, Shavi Kapito, Shaw Kapito	
Shiraz	N	As Syrah - 11748	Probably a natural cross between Mondeuse Blanche x Dureza	Albany, Barossa Valley, Bendigo, Blackwood Valley, Canberra, Central WA, Clare Valley, Cowra, Coonawarra, Darling Downs, Denmark, Eden Valley, Frankland River, Geelong, Geographe, Glenrowan, Gold Coast Hinterland, Goulburn Valley, Grampians, Granite Belt, Great Lakes, Heathcote, Hilltops, Hunter Valley, King Valley, Langhorne Creek, McLaren Vale, Macedon Ranges, Manjimup, Margaret River, Mornington Peninsula, Mount Benson, Mudgee, Murray Darling, Orange, Padthaway, Peel, Pemberton, Perricoota, Perth Hills, Pyrenees, Riverina, Riverland, Rutherglen, Shoalhaven Coast, South Burnett, Southern Fleurieu, Sunbury, Swan District, Swan Hill, Swan Valley, Western Plains, Wrattonbully, Yarra Valley	Antournerein, Antournerein Noir, Antournerin, Anzher Muskatnyi, Arnitas, Balsamina, Biaune, Biaune Noir, Bione, Blaue Schiraz, Blaue Serine, Blaue Sirah, Blauer Syrah, Bragiola, Candive, Candive Noir, Caudive, Ciras, Costigliola, Costiola, Damas Noir du Puy de Dôme, Damaszener Blau, Di Santi, EntourneIrein, Entournerein, Entournerin, Ermitage, Fresa Grossa, Hermitage, Hignin, Hignin Noir, Marsanne Noir, Marsanne Noire, Neiret di Saluzzo, Neiretta Cunese, Neiretta del Cuneese-Fassanese, Neiretta del Monregalese, Neiretta del Rosso, Neiretta dell'Albese, Neiretta di Saluzzo, Neiretto del Cuneese, Neiretto di Bene, Neiretto di Carru, Neiretto di Costigliole, Neiretto di Farigliano, Neiretto di Saluzzo, Nereta Piccola di Monre-Galese, Neretta Cuneese, Neretta del Cuneese-Fassanese, Neretta del Monregalese, Neretta di Costigliole, Neretta di Saluzzo, Neretta Piccola, Neretta Piccola di Dogliani, Neretto del Beinale, Neretto di Dogliani, Neretto di Saluzzo, Petite Chiras, Petite Sirah, Petite Sirrah, Petite Syrah, Petite Syras, Plan de la Biaune, Plant de Biaune, Plant de la Bianne, Plant de la Biaune, Schiras, Schiraz, Scyras, Seraene, Sereine, Serene, Serenne, Serine, Serine Noir, Serine Noire, Serinne, Sevene, Shiras, Shiraz, Shyrac, Sira, Sirac, Sirah, Sirah de l'Ermitage, Sirah dell'Ermitaggio, Siriaca, Sirrah, Syra, Syrac, Syrac de l'Ermitage, Syracuse, Syrah Crni, Zagarese, Ziza, Zizak	
Siegerrebe	Rs	11781	Madeleine Angevine x Gewürztraminer	Coal River Valley, Huon/Channel	Alzey 7957, AZ 7957, S. 7957, Scheu 7957, Sieger	
Slankamenka	Rg	As Slankamenka Béla - 11866	Balint Weiß x Razaki Kirmizi	Riverland	Darkaia de Jerusalem, Elezusa, Jane de Smirna, Kirmizi Razaki, Madaruša, Mädchentraube Rot, Maghiarca, Majarcă Albă, Magyarica, Magyarka, Razachie Rosie, Razaki Rosso, Razakia Cervena, Razakija Chervena, Slankamenka Béla, Slankamenka Bianca, Slankamenka Bijela, Slankamenka Blanche, Szlanka Fehér, Weißer Slankamenka	
Souzao (Note: For many years the names Sousão (Souzão) and Vinhão have been used as synonyms for what was taken to be a single grape variety. However, a recent research program in Portugal using microsatellite technology and RAPD (Random Amplified Polymorphic DNA) and ISSR (Inter Simple Sequence Repeat) molecular techniques came to the following conclusion: "Results highlight the genetic proximity between Sousão and Vinhão accessions. Sousão is the prime name of a cultivar grown especially in ‘Vinhos Verdes’ Region whose cultivar designation was modified to Sezão in the last review of the ‘Portuguese List of Varieties fit for Wine Production’. Vinhão has been reported as the synonym of the Spanish cultivar Sousón. However, a focus of confusion exists in Douro Region, where, frequently, the name Sousão it given to the cultivar Vinhão. Though, the observed separated RAPD clusters for Sousão and Vinhão groups are correct, nevertheless, the fact that these accessions have a miscellany of names between the two RAPD clusters and that they cluster together in the ISSR marker analysis, suggest that Sousão and Vinhão accessions are genetically close.")	N	As Sezão - 22984	Unknown	Barossa Valley, Geographe, McLaren Vale, Margaret River, Peel, Riverland, Rutherglen, Swan Valley, Yarra Valley	Espadeiro Basto, Espadeiro da Tinta, Espadeiro Preto, Loureira Tinta, Negrão, Pinhão, Sezão, Sousao, Sousão, Sousão de Comer, Sousão de Correr, Sousão Vermelho, Sousão Forte, Sousón, Souzão, Tinta Nacional, Tinta País, Tintilla, Tinto Antigo, Tinto de Parada, Tinto Nacional, Vinhão	
Syrah (See Shiraz)						
343 (See Merlot)			A clone of Merlot			
Tannat	N	12257	Unknown	Adelaide Hills, Barossa Valley, Beechworth, Eden Valley, Grampians, Granite Belt, Hastings River, Hunter Valley, King Valley, Langhorne Creek, McLaren Vale, Margaret River, Murray Darling, New England, Orange, Shoalhaven Coast, Riverland	Bordelais Noir, Bordelez Beltza, Harriague, Madiran, Madiron, Mouston, Moustron, Moustrou, Moustroun, Tanat, Tannat Gris, Tannat Noir, Tannat Noir Male	
Tarrango	N	12267	Touriga Nacional x Sultana = Sultanina	Alpine Valleys, Big Rivers, Goulburn Valley, King Valley, Murray Darling, Peel		
Tempranillo	N	As Tempranillo Tinto - 12350	Albillo Mayor x Benedicto	Adelaide Hills, Adelaide Plains, Alpine Valleys, Barossa Valley, Beechworth, Bendigo, Blackwood Valley, Canberra, Central WA, Clare Valley, Coonawarra, Cowra, Denmark, Frankland River, Geelong, Geographe, Gippsland, Grampians, Granite Belt, Greater Perth, Gundagai, Heathcote, Henty, Hilltops, Hunter Valley, Kangaroo Island, King Valley, Langhorne Creek, Limestone Coast, McLaren Vale, Macedon Ranges, Manjimup, Margaret River, Mornington Peninsula, Mount Barker, Mudgee, Murray Darling, Nagambie Lakes, New England, Orange, Padthaway, Peel, Perth Hills, Porongurup, Pyrenees, Queensland Zone, Riverina, Riverland, Rutherglen, Shoalhaven Coast, South Burnett, South Coast Zone, Southern Fleurieu, Southern Flinders Ranges, Southern Highlands, Strathbogie Ranges, Sunbury, Swan District, Swan Hill, Swan Valley, Tamar Valley, Tasmania Southern, Upper Goulburn, Western Plains, Wrattonbully, Yarra Valley	Albillo Negro, Aldepenas, Aragón, Aragones, Aragonez, Aragonez da Ferra, Aragonez de Elvas, Arauxa, Arganda, Arinto Tinto, Botón de Gallo, Castellana, Cencibel, Chinchillana, Chinchilyano, Escobera, Garnacho Foño, Grenache de Logrono, Jacibiera, Jacivera, Negra de Mesa, Negretto, Piñuela, Roriz, Santo Stefano, Sensibal, Tempranilla, Tempranillo de la Rioja, Tempranillo de Perralillo Tempranillo de Rioja, Tempranillo de Rioza, Tempranillo Rioja, Tempranillo Tinta, Tempranillo Tinto, Tinta Aragonez, Tinta de Nava, Tinta de País, Tinta del Toro, Tinta do Inacio, Tinta do País, Tinta Fina, Tinta Madrid, Tinta Roriz, Tinta Santiago, Tinto Aragónez, Tinto de Madrid, Tinto del País, Tinto Fino, Tinto Madrid, Tinto País, Tinto Ribiera, Ull de Llebre, Valdepeñas, Verdiell, Vid de Aranda	
Teroldego	N	12371	Unknown	Alpine Valleys, King Valley, Langhorne Creek, McLaren Vale, Margaret River	Merlina, Terodola, Teroldega, Teroldeghe, Teroldego Rotaliano, Teroldela, Teroldico, Teroldigo, Teroldigo Crni, Teroldila, Teroldola, Tiraldega, Tiraldola, Tirodola, Tiroldegho, Tiroldico, Tiroldigo	
Tinta Amarela (See Trincadeira Preta)						
Tinta Negra Mole	N	As Mollar Cano - 7901	Hebén x ?	McLaren Vale, Swan Valley	Molar, Mollar, Mollar Cano, Mollar de América, Mollar de Cádiz, Mollar de Granada, Mollar de Huelva, Mollar ICA, Mulata, Negra Criolla, Negra Mole, Negramoll, Negramolle, Rabo de Ovelha Tinto, Saborinho, Tinta de Madeira, Tinta Madeira, Tinta Negra, Tinta Negra Mole	
Tinto Cão	N	12500	Unknown	Adelaide Plains, Barossa Valley, Beechworth, Geographe, McLaren Vale, Margaret River, Mudgee, Peel, Riverland, Rutherglen, Swan Valley, Yarra Valley	Castellana Negra, Farmento, Farnento, Teinta Cam, Tinta Cam, Tinta Cão, Tintilla Castellana, Tinto Cam	
Tinta Roriz (See Tempranillo)						
Touriga Nacional	N	12594	Unknown	Adelaide Hills, Barossa Valley, Beechworth, Bendigo, Canberra, Clare Valley, Frankland River, Geographe, Goulburn Valley, Granite Belt, Heathcote, Hilltops, Hunter Valley, Langhorne Creek, McLaren Vale, Margaret River, Mudgee, New England, Peel, Perth Hills, Pyrenees, Riverina, Riverland, Rutherglen, Swan District, Tamar Valley,	Azal Espanhol, Bical, Bical Tinto, Carabuñera, Mortagua, Mortagua Preto, Touriga, Touriga Fina, Touriga National, Tourigo, Tourigo Antiguo, Tourigo do Dão	
Tribidrag (Note: Robinson et al say under "Tribidrag"" in Wine Grapes: A complete guide to 1,368 vine varieties, including their origins and flavours. "Tribidrag is the oldest name for this variety", and therefore "According to the rule of anteriority, whereby the oldest name takes precedence, Tribidrag is adopted here as the prime name for this variety.” Searches on Wikipedia under the variety names Primitivo and Tribidrag direct to Zinfandel where it is pointed out in the first paragraph that DNA analysis has now identified these three varieties along with Crljenak Kaštelanski as being identical. There has been more than a century of debate about this, and a recent article which maps these changing opinions about the origin and identity of Zinfandel says that due to DNA profiling conducted by US geneticist Carole Meredith from the University of Chicago with oenologists Ivan Pejić and Edi Maletić both from the University of Zagreb, it has been shown that: "Crljenak Kaštelanski, Primitivo and Zinfandel grapes were a perfect DNA match, and Plavac Mali (Once said to be identical with Zinfandel) turned out to be what Dr. Meredith called ”a son of Zinfandel,” a cross between Crljenak and the Dobričić grape," and that the oldest name in use was Crljenak Kaštelanski not Tribidrag. It seems likely that this was the DNA analysis to which Zinfandel referred. While there has been an attempt internationally to standardise this name (and as already mentioned, Robinson et al. have favoured Tribidrag), there has been no agreement because US winemakers have preferred to maintain their long-time use of Zinfandel and US labelling laws prevent them from using the alternatives, those in Italy prefer Primitivo, and Australian winemakers are tending to use both Zinfandel and Primitivo with a preference for the former. Ironically, the desire of Italian winemakers to use the name Zinfandel instead of Primitivo for their locally-made wines led to a legal dispute which has not yet reached its conclusion. The point being made by US winemakers is that the name Zinfandel originated in the US, specifically in California, and that it is rightfully "owned" by that country. In addition, their stated fear is that, if Italy's were able to market wines as Zinfandel in Europe, this would undermine the US's already massively successful exporting program.)	N	As Primitivo - 9763	Unknown	Adelaide Hills, Adelaide Plains, Barossa Valley, Bendigo, Canberra, Central WA, Clare Valley, Eden Valley, Geelong, Geographe, Glenrowan, Goulburn Valley, Granite Belt, Heathcote, Hilltops, Kangaroo Island, King Valley, Langhorne Creek, McLaren Vale, Margaret River, Mudgee, Murray Darling, Nagambie Lakes, Orange, Peel, Pemberton, Perth Hills, Riverina, Rutherglen, Southern Tasmania, Swan District, Swan Valley, Upper Goulburn,	Crljenac Kaštelanski, Crljenak, Grakošija, Gratošija, Kaštelanski, Krakošija, Kratkošica, Kratkošija, Kratkošija Crna, Kratošija, Kratošijo, Morellone, Pribidrag, Primaticcio, Primativo, Primitivo, Primitivo di Gioia, Trebidrag, Uva di Corato, Zagarese, Zinfandel	
Trincadeira Preta	N	As Trincaderia - 15685	Unknown	Adelaide Plains, Barossa Valley, Eden Valley, McLaren Vale, Margaret River, Peel, Yarra Valley	Black Alicante, Black Portugal, Castelão de Cova da Beira, Crato Preto, Crato Tinto, Folha de Abobora, Mortágua, Mortágua Preto, Mourteiro, Murteira, Negreda, Padeiro Bravo, Rifete, Rosete Espalhado, Tinta Amarela, Tinta Amarelha, Tinta Amarella, Tinta Carvallera, Tinta Manuola, Torneiro, Trincadeira	
Trollinger	N	As Schiava Grossa - 10823	Unknown	Adelaide Hills, Murray Darling	Admiral, Ägypter, Ägyptische, Ägyptischer, Aleksandriskii Chernyi, Baccaria, Bacher Acher, Bacheracher, Bachtraube, Bammerer, Barth der Alte, Barth der Alten, Bilsenroth, Black Gibraltar, Black Hambourg, Black Hamburg, Black Hamburgh, Black Prince, Black Tripoli, Blaue Trollinger, Blauer Gelbhölzer, Blauer Malvasier, Blauer Trollinger, Blauer Wingertshäuser, Blau Wälsche, Blauwälsche, Bleu Frankenthaler, Bocksauge, Bocksaugen, Bocksbeutel, Bockshoden, Bockstraube, Bommerer, Braddick's Seedling, Bresciana, Bressana, Bruxellois, Bruxelloise, Buckeye, Buckeyes, Chasselas Bleu de Windsor, Chasselas de Jérusalem, Chasselas de Windsor, Colònia Blau, Columeliatraube, Dachtraube, Dachtrauben, Dutch Hamburgh, Edel Vernatsch, Edelvernatsch, Fleisch Traube, Fleischtraube, Frankentaler, Frankenthal, Frankenthal Noir, Frankenthaler, Garnston Black Hamburgh, Garston Black Hamburgh, Gelbe Trollinger, Gelbholziger Schwarzblauer Trollinger, Gelbholziger Trollinger, Gros Bleu, Gros Noir, Gros Plant Grand Noir, Gross Italiener, Gross Vernatsch, Grosse Race, Grosser Burgunder, Grossroth, Großschwarzer, Großvernatsch, Großvernatsch Blauer, Hammelshoden, Hammelsschelle, Hammelssohlen, Hampton Court, Hampton Court Black Hamburgh, Hampton Court Vine, Hudler, Huttler, Imperator, Kechmish Ali Violet, Kechmish Aly Violet, Kék Trollingi, Khei-Khan, Kleinvernatsch, Knevet's Black Hamburgh, Knevett's Black Hamburgh, Kölner Blau, Kreuzertraube, Lambert, Lamper, Languedoc, Lombard, Lugiana Nera, Maltheser Roth, Malvasier, Malvoisier, Maroquin d’Espagne, Meraner Kurtraube, Ministra, Modri Tirolan, Mörchel, Mohrendutte, Mohrentutte, Morrokin Barbaron, Muscatellier Noir, Nougaret Gros Race, Nougaret Grosse Race, Pfund Traube, Pfundtraube, Plant de Paris, Pommerer, Pope Hamburgh, Prince Albert, Purple Hamburgh, Queen Victoria, Raisin Bleu, Raisin Bleu de Frankental, Raisin Bleu Recherché, Raisin de Frankenthal, Raisin de Languedoc, Red Hamburg, Red Hamburgh, Rheinwein Blau, Richmond Villa, Richmond Villa Hamburgh, Rothelbner, Rother Maltheser, Salisbury Violette, Schiava Grossa,* Schiavona del Trentino, Schiavona di Merano Nera, Schiavone, Schiavone di Merano Nero, Schliege, Schwarzblauer, Schwarzblauer Trollinger, Schwarze Ordinaere, Schwarzer, Schwarzer Gutedel, Schwarzer Wälscher, Schwarzer Welscher, Scharzwälsch, Schwarzwälscher, Schwarzwelscher, Spanisch Blau, Straihntraube, Straihutraube, Südtiroler Kurtrauben, Teplichnyi Chernyi, Tirolan Crni, Tirolinger, Toroldola Grossa, Tripoli Victoria Hamburgh, Trolinger, Trolinske, Troller, Trollinger Blau, Trollinger Blauer, Trollinger Gelbholzig, Trollinger Jena, Trollinger Typ 1, Trollinger Typ 2, Trollinger Typ 3, Trollinger Weißholzig, Trollingi Kék, Tschaggele, Ungarische Rote, Uva Cenerente, Uva Meranese, Uva Nera d’Amburgo, Valentines, Vernatsch,* Victoria, Victoria Hamburgh, Wälscher, Warner's Hamburgh, Weißholziger, Weißholziger Trollinger, Welke Burgundske, Welko Modre, Welscher, Ziegestraube, Zottelwälscher, Zottler (*These are the other main names)	
Trousseau Noir	N	12668	? x Savagnin Blanc = Traminer	Adelaide Hills, Barossa Valley, Geographe, Margaret River, Swan Valley, Tamar Valley	Abrunhal, Bastardillo Chico, Bastardinha, Bastardinho, Bastardo, Capbreton Rouge, Carnaz, Chauche Noir, Cruchenton Rouge, Donzelino de Castille, Godello Tinto, Gros Cabernet, (Note: As well its use as a synonym for Trousseau Noir, there is also a variety of this name.)	María Ordoña, Maria Ordoñez, Maturana Tinta, Maturana Tinto, Maturano, Merenzao, Pinot Gris de Rio Negro, Roibal, Tinta, Tintilla, Tintollo Borgolona, Sémillon Rouge, Troussé, Trousseau, Troussot, Trusiaux, Verdejo, Verdejo Negro
Troya (See Jacquez)						
Tyrian	N		Sumoll x Cabernet Sauvignon	Hunter Valley, Riverina, Robe, Swan Valley		
Vernatsch (See Trollinger)						
Vespolina	N	13018	Nebbiolo x Coccalona Nera	Alpine Valleys	Balsamina, Canneta, Guzetta, Guzzetta, Inzaga, Inzagre, Massana, Nespolina, Nespolino, Nespoulìn, Novalina, Solenga, Ughetta, Ughetta di Caneto, Ughetta di Canetto, Ughetta di Fassolo, Ughetta di Solenga, Uva Cinerina, Uva di Canneto, Uvetta di Canneto, Uvetta di Fassolo, Vespolino, Vispavola	
Zibibbo (See Muscat Rouge à Petits Grains)						
Zinfandel (See Tribidrag)						
Zweigelt	N	As Zweigeltrebe Blau - 13484	Saint Laurent x Blaufränkisch	Adelaide Hills, Swan Hill	Blaue Zweigeltrebe, Blauer Zweigelt, Blauerzweigelt, Cvaigelt, Cveigelt, Klosterneuburg 71, Klosterneuburg 181-2-71, Negru Lui Zweigelt, Rotburger, Semenac Cerni 71, Zwiegel, Zweigelt 71, Zweigelt Blau, Zweigelt Blauer, Zweigelt Crni, Zweigelt Zsölö, Zweigeltrebe	

== Supplemental references used for charts ==
- Anderson, Kym, and Signe Nelgen. Which Winegrape is Grown Where?: A Global Empirical Picture, Revised Edition. Edited by Kym Anderson and N R Aryal. University of Adelaide Press, 2020. ISBN 978-1-925261-86-8 Published online 2020. ISBN 978-1-925261-87-5. Accessed 2 February 2021. (Databases relevant to this book can be accessed in Excel spreadsheet format at
- "FPS Grape Registry: Grapevine Varieties." Foundation Plant Services (FPS), College of Agricultural and Environmental Sciences, University of California, Davis. Accessed 23 February 2020.
- Halliday, James, et al. Halliday Wine Companion. Accessed 9 March 2020.
- _____. James Halliday's Wine Atlas of Australia. Hardie Grant, 2014. ISBN 1-74270-396-8.
- _____. Varietal Wines: A guide to 130 varieties grown in Australia and their place in the international wine landscape. Hardie Grant Books, 2015. ISBN 1-74270-860-9.
- Higgs, Darby. Vinodiversity. Accessed 5 March 2020.
- Maul, Erika, et al. Vitis International Variety Catalogue. (VIVC). Julius Kühn-Institut - Federal Research Centre for Cultivated Plants (JKI), Institute for Grapevine Breeding - Geilweilerhof. Accessed 7 March 2020.
- Robinson, Jancis. Vines, Grapes & Wines: A wine drinker's guide to grape varieties. Mitchell Beazley, 1986. ISBN 1-85732-999-6.
- Robinson, Julia Harding et al. The Oxford Companion to Wine. 4th Edition. Edited by Jancis Robinson and Julia Harding. Oxford University Press, 2015. ISBN 978-0-19-870538-3.
- Robinson, Harding and José Vouillamoz. Wine Grapes: A complete guide to 1,368 vine varieties, including their origins and flavours. HarperCollins, 2013. ISBN 0-14-196882-6. Access available online at Apple Books. ISBN 0-06-232551-5 Accessed 7 March 2020.
- Tischelmayer, Norbert, et al. "Glossary." Wein-Plus. (WPG) Accessed 7 March 2020.
- Wine Australia. (WA) Accessed 7 March 2020.
- Wine-Searcher. Grape Varieties.. Accessed 7 March 2020.
