= Gundagai wine region =

Gundagai
- Wine region
- Year established: 2002
- Country: Australia
- Part of: Southern New South Wales
- Location: 35°S 148°E
- Heat units: 2110 (Junee), 1500 (Tumut), 2050 (Cootamundra)
- Precipitation (annual average): 240 mm (Junee), 420 mm (Tumut), 270 mm (Cootamundra)
- Varietals produced: Shraz, Cabernet Sauvignon, Chardonnay, Semillon

Gundagai is an Australian Geographical Indication for a wine region centred on the town of Gundagai in the Australian state of New South Wales. It is part of the Southern New South Wales zone. The region includes Tumut on the northwestern slopes of the Snowy Mountains, Cootamundra in its north and extends west to Junee and almost to Wagga Wagga. Junee is on the boundary to the Riverina wine region (which also includes Wagga Wagga). Gundagai is also bounded on the northeast by Hilltops, the east by Canberra District and the south by Tumbarumba.

The Gundagai region has a range of altitude, temperature and rainfall in the three key areas surrounding the towns of Tumut, Junee and Cootamundra. The altitude ranges from 210 metres (690 ft) at Junee to 320 metres (1,050 ft) at Cootamundra while growing season rainfall ranges from 240 millimetres (9.4 in) at Junee to 420 millimetres (17 in) at Tumut. Tumut is much cooler and the harvest is later than the rest of the region.
