= Hilltops =

Hilltops are the tops of Hills.

The word may also refer to:

- Hilltops Council, local government area in New South Wales
- Hilltops wine region, covering roughly the same area
