= Glenrowan =

Glenrowan is a name associated with a place in the Australian state of Victoria. it may refer to:

- Glenrowan, Victoria, a small town on the Hume Highway
- Glenrowan wine region
- Glenrowan railway station
- The Glenrowan Affair, a 1951 movie about Ned Kelly
