= Hastings River wine region =

Hastings River
- Wine region
- Type: Australian Geographical Indication
- Year established: 1999
- Country: Australia
- Part of: Northern Rivers
- Heat units: 2310
- Precipitation (annual average): 1,080 millimetres (43 in)
- Size of planted vineyards: 200 hectares (490 acres)
- Varietals produced: Chambourcin, Verdelho chardonnay
- No. of wineries: 6

Hastings River is an Australian Geographical Indication for a wine region in the Northern Rivers area of New South Wales around the Hastings River near Wauchope and Port Macquarie.The region is within 25 kilometres (16 mi) of the east coast of Australia, between the Pacific Ocean and the Great Dividing Range.

The first vineyard was planted in 1837 by Henry Fancourt White. There were 33 vineyards by 1860, however these declined and there was no wine production between 1920 and 1980 when new vineyards began to be planted. The main styles produced now include Chardonnay, Semillon, Cabernet Sauvignon/Merlot and Chambourcin.
