= Big Rivers (wine) =

- Wine region
- Type: Australian Geographical Indication (zone)
- Year established: 1996
- Country: Australia
- Part of: New South Wales
- Sub-regions: Murray Darling, Perricoota, Riverina, Swan Hill

Big Rivers is a grape growing zone in Australia. It covers the southwestern corner of the state of New South Wales. The zone currently includes four wine regions, which cover the main areas of grape growing in the zone, but not all of them.

The four regions in the Big Rivers zone are Murray Darling, Perricoota, Riverina and Swan Hill. The Murray Darling and Swan Hill regions span the state border (the Murray River), and are partly in Big Rivers zone in New South Wales, and partly in the North West Victoria zone of Victoria.

The area enclosed in the Big Rivers zone is bounded by the state boundaries with South Australia and Victoria. It extends as far north along the South Australia border to include the city of Broken Hill. It extends east along the Murray River past Albury. Parkes and Forbes are towns near the northeastern corner.
