= Heathcote wine region =

Wine region in Victoria, Australia

Coordinates: 36°54′58″S 144°41′46.5″E

The Heathcote Wine Region of Victoria, Australia, is nestled between the Goulburn Valley and Bendigo regions. The region is famous for its Shiraz production.

== Geography ==
North of the Great Dividing Range the region is at elevations between 160 and 380 metres (520 and 1,250 ft). The climate and soils are strongly influenced by the Mt Camel range that extends from Corop to Tooborac. For the most part, the soil under vine is Cambrian - red and deep with excellent water holding capacity. The region’s rainfall is evenly distributed between the seasons and the temperature range is defined as temperate, with cooling winds emanating from the south resulting in summer temperatures two to three degrees cooler than nearby Bendigo.

== Wines ==
The oldest Shiraz vines on the Cambrian soil were planted by Albino Zuber in the late 1960s on a site that has now been acquired by Shadowfax Winery. The Heathcote wine region includes wineries such as; Merindoc, McIvor Estate, Heathcote Winery, Wild Duck Creek, Sanguine, Humis Vineyard and many more.
