= Cowra wine region =

Wine region in New South Wales, Australia

Cowra
- Wine region
- Year established: 1998
- Country: Australia
- Part of: Central Ranges
- Location: 33.7°S 148.6°E
- Climate region: Humid subtropical/maritime
- Heat units: 2130
- Precipitation (annual average): 370 millimetres (15 in)
- Total area: 1,250 square kilometres (480 sq mi)
- Varietals produced: Chardonnay
- No. of wineries: 6

Cowra is a wine region and Australian Geographical Indication in the Central Ranges zone in the Australian state of New South Wales. It is named for the town of Cowra.

Cowra is the southernmost, lowest altitude and warmest of the three regions in the Central Ranges zone. Vineyards began to be planted from 1973, and are predominantly irrigated white wine grapes. The region is 1,250 square kilometres (480 sq mi) of the Lachlan River valley of New South Wales, including the towns of Cowra, Billimari and Canowindra. The region has a number of specialist organic and sustainable agriculture vineyards.

== Wineries ==
The first vineyards were planted in the 1970s and were predominantly chardonnay. Since this time, a range of varieties including Sangiovese, Mourvedre and Tempranillo have had success.
