= Swan Hill wine region =

Swan Hill
- Wine region
- Type: Australian Geographical Indication
- Year established: 1996
- Country: Australia
- Part of: Big Rivers and North West Victoria
- Location: 35.25°S 143.5°E
- Heat units: 2138
- Precipitation (annual average): 178 millimetres (7.0 in)
- Varietals produced: Chardonnay, Shiraz and Cabernet Sauvignon
- No. of wineries: 10
- Wine produced: fruit driven wines suitable for short to medium-term cellaring

Swan Hill is a wine region name protected by an Australian Geographical Indication (AGI). It is named for the town of Swan Hill on the south side of the Murray River in the Australian state of Victoria. The wine region spans the Murray and the north eastern part of the region is in the state of New South Wales. The north-eastern part of the region is in the New South Wales zone of Big Rivers. The southern and western parts are in the Victoria zone of North West Victoria. The region spans from Lake Charm and Benjeroop in the southeast through Lake Boga and Swan Hill to past Piangil and Tooleybuc in the north.

Almost all vineyards in the Swan Hill region are irrigated from the Murray River or its tributaries. Irrigation began in the 1880s, and the first modern vineyards were planted in the 1930s. The wines are known as fruit driven wines suitable for short to medium-term cellaring.
