= Riverland wine region =

Wine region in South Australia

Riverland
- Wine region
- Type: Australian geographical indication (AGI)
- Country: Australia
- Part of: Lower Murray zone
- No. of vineyards: 1045
- Grapes produced: 411,000 tonnes (405,000 long tons; 453,000 short tons) (2012)
- Comments: http://www.riverlandwine.com.au/

The Riverland wine region is an Australian geographical indication roughly corresponding to the Riverland tourism region in South Australia. It is the only region currently identified in the Lower Murray zone and does not have any defined subregions. The region roughly corresponds to the river flats and irrigated lands along the Murray River from just below where it flows into South Australia downstream to Blanchetown.

== See also ==
- South Australian wine
