= Murray Darling =

Coordinates: 34°11′20″S 142°09′30″E

- Wine region
- Type: Australian Geographical Indication
- Year established: 1997
- Part of: Big Rivers and North West Victoria
- Heat units: 2150-2240
- Precipitation (annual average): 130 millimetres (5.1 in) – 150 millimetres (5.9 in)

Murray Darling is a wine region and Australian Geographical Indication which spans the Murray River and its confluence with the Darling River in northwestern Victoria and southwestern New South Wales. It was registered as a protected name on 16 June 1997.

Murray Darling is the second-largest wine region in Australia. Vines were first planted there in 1888, around the time that irrigation schemes made it possible to grow fruit in the otherwise arid landscape through which this part of the Murray River flows.

Key towns in the region are Mildura, Merbein, Robinvale in Victoria and Balranald, Euston and Wentworth in New South Wales.
