= Kangaroo Island wine region =

Wine region in South Australia

Kangaroo Island
- Wine region
- Type: Australian Geographical Indication
- Year established: 2000.
- Country: Australia
- Part of: Fleurieu zone
- Heat units: 1380–1450
- Precipitation (annual average): 280 mm (11 in)
- Size of planted vineyards: 140 ha (350 acres)
- No. of vineyards: 30
- Varietals produced: Cabernet Sauvignon, Shiraz & Chardonnay
- No. of wineries: 12
- Comments: 2014

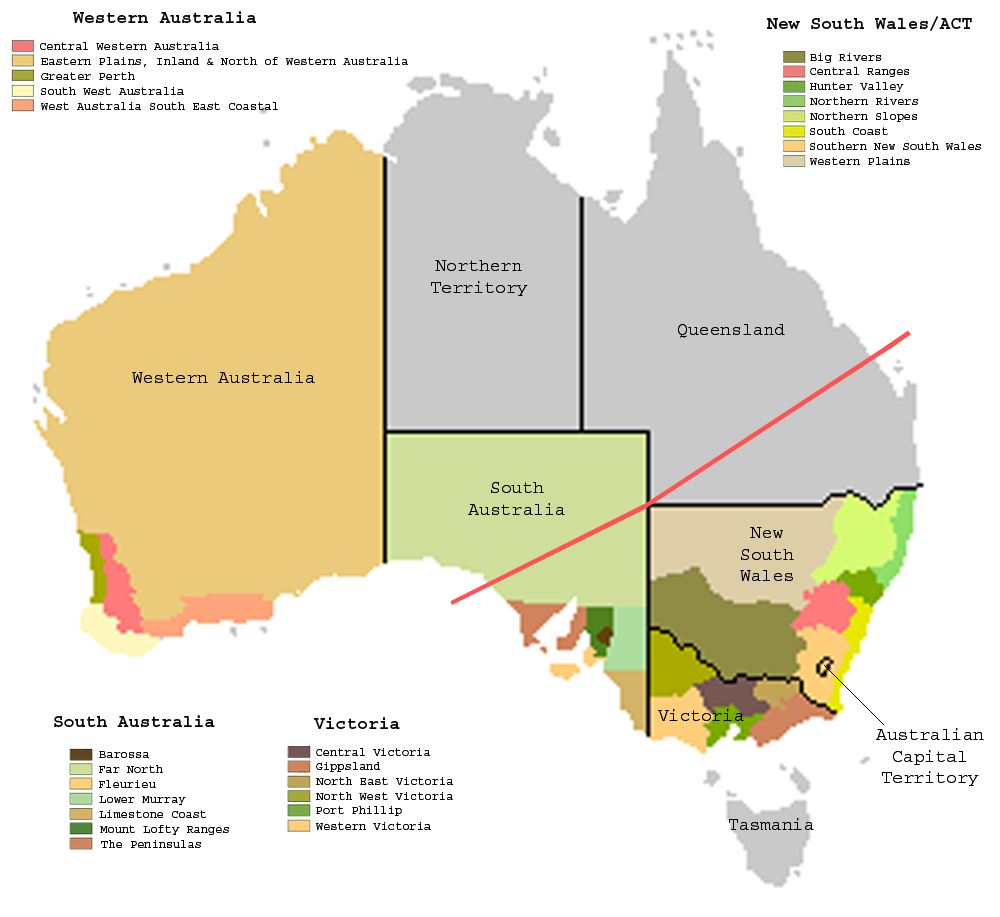
Australian wine zones & regions

Kangaroo Island wine region is a wine region which covers the full extent of Kangaroo Island in South Australia. The wine region is one of five wine regions comprising the Fleurieu zone. The term ‘Kangaroo Island’ was registered as an Australian Geographical Indication under the Wine Australia Corporation Act 1980 on 8 December 2000. As of 2014, the region is reported as containing at least 30 growers and 12 wineries. As of 2014, the most common plantings within the region within a total planted area of 140 ha (350 acres) was reported as being Shiraz (35.7%) followed by Cabernet Sauvignon (30.7%) and Chardonnay (7.1%).

== See also ==
- South Australian wine

== Citations and references ==
=== References ===
- Phylloxera and Grape Industry Board of SA (PGIBSA) (2014), "Australian regional winegrape crush survey online" (PDF), South Australian Winegrape Utilisation and Pricing Surveys, Phylloxera and Grape Industry Board of SA, ISSN 1442-6048, archived from the original (PDF) on 6 November 2014
