= Shoalhaven Coast =

- Wine region
- Type: Australian Geographical Indication
- Year established: 2002
- Country: Australia
- Part of: South Coast
- Location: 34°48′36″S 150°38′13″E
- Varietals produced: Chambourcin, Verdelho

Shoalhaven Coast is an Australian wine region located in the state of New South Wales.

The Shoalhaven Coast wine region is located in the state of New South Wales. It is close to the cities of Sydney, Wollongong and Canberra. The region has 16 cellar doors that have produced 500 tonnes or 400,000 bottles of wine.

The region is popularly known for Chambourcin, a French red wine. It is produced by crossbreeding and it has a bright and striking colour and an aroma of plummy fruit. The superb coastal beaches brings in enormous tourism, which boosts the wine market. Because of that, the cellar doors in the area are bustling with activities.

The region also boasts of the Coolangatta Estate, which is a major tourist attraction in the region.

The Shoalhaven coast has been a great success over the years with the establishment of new wineries and increased number of visitors to the area. This has positioned the region in the forefront of North South Wales wine industry.

Shoalhaven Coast holds a Winter wine festival every year in June. The festival is supported by wine tours from Sydney and Wollongong. It offers winery tours, outdoor entertainment and regional food tastings.

== History ==
Shoalhaven is a city located in the South-eastern coastal region of New South Wales, Australia. It is about 200 kilometres south of Sydney. It is adjacent to the Tasman Sea. The South coast railway line cuts through the northern part of the city and stops at Bomaderry. As at 2013, the city has a population of 97,694. The city was named "Shoalhaven" by George Bass in 1797, when he explored the area and crossed the entryway to the river. He called it "Shoal Haven" because of the low depth of the river mouth.

Vineyards and wineries in the Shoalhaven Coast region were established in the 1980s. Therefore, most of them are small, but a lot of people are investing massively over the last decade.

== Coolangatta Estate ==
The first vineyard in the region was planted by Alexander Berry at Coolangatta Estate on the slopes of Mt. Coolangatta. It is situated on the northern bank of the Shoalhaven River. The word "Coolangatta" means "good lookout". The estate is surrounded by vineyards.

== Climate ==
Shoalhaven region has warm temperatures during the growing season. Vineyards on the north directly facing the slopes are open, well-drained and exposed to air. The only problem with the region is the unpredictable summer rainfall. The climate of the region is highly influenced by the Pacific Ocean.

== Wine varieties in the Shoalhaven coast region ==
The two major varieties of wine in Shoalhaven coast are the Chambourcin and Verdelho. Chambourcin is a French hybrid grape variety for making wine. It has a great resistance to fungal diseases. It is good for the humid summer climate experienced in the region. The wine produced from this variety is deep-coloured with an aroma of plummy fruit.

Verdelho originates from Portugal and the Island of Madeira. In Australia, it is used to produce white table wines. It is an alternative to Chardonnay wine. They are common because they smell and taste like they produced from grapes.

Other types of wine produced in the region are Sauvignon blanc, Semillon, Cabernet Sauvignon and Shiraz. New varieties of wine are also springing up, such as, Arneis, Viognier, Tempranillo, Sangiovese and Tannat.

== Shoalhaven coast wine winter festival ==
the Shoalhaven Coast Winter Wine Festival no longer takes place. It stopped during Covid and has not recommenced and there are no plans for it to resume.

== Award winning wines ==
The region is known for producing quality and premium wine. This feat was recognized with more than 1,000 Australian and International wine awards.
