= Mornington Peninsula wine region =

Wine-growing region in Victoria, Australia

Coordinates: 38.351°S 145.064°E

Mornington Peninsula
- Wine region
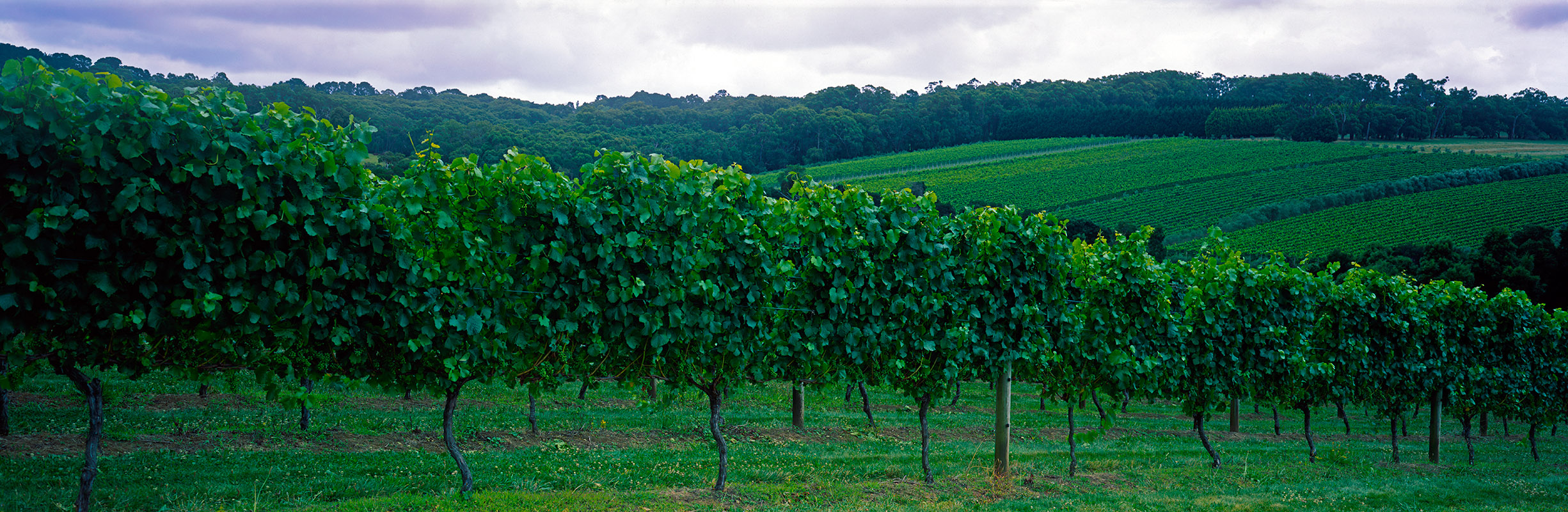
- Type: Wine region
- Country: Australia
- Climate region: Maritime
- Size of planted vineyards: 1,915 acres (7.75 km^{2})
- No. of vineyards: 200
- Grapes produced: Pinot noir, Chardonnay, Pinot gris
- No. of wineries: 50

The Mornington Peninsula is an Australian wine region located south of Melbourne, Victoria. The region has a cool climate making wine growing ideal and focuses on Pinot noir production but has had success with other varietals including Chardonnay, Pinot gris and Tempranillo. The region is known for its medium bodied, dry wines and sparkling wines that show structure and complexity. The still wine versions of Chardonnay reflect a diversity of styles, all typically oaked, from more citrus to more tropical fruit flavours.

== Geography and climate ==
The Peninsula features a benign maritime climate with an average vintage temperature of 20.2 °C (68.4 °F). Soils differ greatly across the region, ranging from sandy flatlands around Moorooduc and Tuerong, pale brown alluvial soils at Dromana on the northern coastline to the deep russet volcanic soils between Merricks and Balnarring and the south coast. The whole region sits between 25 and 250 metres and receives an average of 350mm rainfall during the growing season.

== History ==
The first plantings were in 1886 when wine produced from fruit planted at Dromana won an honourable mention at the Intercontinental Exhibition. An 1891 Royal Commission on Fruit and Vegetables states there were six registered vineyards in the region. By the turn of the century, economic decline, the threat of phylloxera and changing palatal preference impacted considerably on cool climate viticulture in Australia and by the 1920s these vineyards had been abandoned. The next attempt came in the 1950s when Seppelt planted 100 acres (0.40 km^{2}) in Dromana, however, this would be destroyed by bushfire in 1967. Continuous production in the region finally began in 1972 when vines were planted on the Mornington Peninsula. The first commercial winery opened at Main Ridge in 1978, its first fruit was picked in 1980.

Wines produced in the region have received international recognition. Namely Stonier Wines, founded by Brian Stonier in Merricks, was awarded the 'Best New World Red Wine of the Year' in 1999 for the 1997 Stonier Reserve Pinot Noir. Such achievement was the first global award for the region and is described as the 'coming of age' for the Mornington Peninsula wine region.

== International Pinot Noir Celebration ==
The Mornington Peninsula International Pinot Noir Celebration is a popular event which is held biennially since 2003 and is hosted by the Mornington Peninsula Vignerons Association (MPVA). It displays the region's capabilities at producing some of Australia's finest Pinot Noir in front of local and international audiences. In 2016, the Victorian Government announced a funding of $7500 for the expansion of the event. It has helped in benefiting pinot noir growers and wineries across the Mornington Peninsula by promoting the region in international markets, supporting export sales and wine tourism.

== See also ==
- Australian wine
- Victorian wine
- Mornington Peninsula
