= Blackwood Valley =

Wine region in South West Australia

Coordinates: 34°S 116°E

Blackwood Valley is a wine region in the south-west of Western Australia, approximately 260 km (160 mi) south-south-east of Perth.

The region was named after the Blackwood River, the longest continually flowing river in Western Australia. The river passes through the towns of Bridgetown, Greenbushes, Nannup, Balingup and Boyup Brook within the region.

== History and industry ==
The Blackwood Valley region was settled in the late 1800s, and timber, horticulture, wool and other farming sustained the region. Blackwood Valley extends approximately to Geographe Bay in the west and north, Manjimup in the south, and Great Southern in the south-east.

It is part of the wine industry in Western Australia. The first vines were planted in the Blackwood Crest winery, located in the north-east of the region, in 1976 by Max Fairbrass. The region produces mainly white wines, and the vineyards in the region number around 50. The harvest time is between late February and early April.

== Climate and geography ==
The climate of the region is Mediterranean, suitable for the growth of white wine vines including Chardonnay and Riesling, as well as red wine grapes like Shiraz and Cabernet Sauvignon. This climate is characterised by moderate temperatures, with rainfall more predominant in the winter months and relatively dry summer months. However, winter frosts occasionally extend through into early spring, which can cause damage to the vines.

The region varies in elevation, from 100 metres in the west to 340 metres in the east. The annual rainfall range is from 600 to 900 millimetres.

The soil in the area is heavily dictated by the topography. A series of smaller valleys which run throughout the region, where the soil is thinner on the slopes than at the base of the valleys where alluvial-type sediment is found. The topography and loamy soil promotes well-drained land suitable for vineyards.

== See also ==
- Geography of Western Australia
- List of wine-producing regions
