= Riverina wine region =

Riverina
- Wine region
- Year established: 1998
- Country: Australia
- Part of: Big Rivers
- Heat units: 2201
- Precipitation (annual average): 200 millimetres (7.9 in)
- Size of planted vineyards: > 20,000 hectares (49,000 acres)
- Grapes produced: 300,000 tonnes in 2013
- Varietals produced: Botrytis Semillon and other warm climate table wines
- No. of wineries: 16

Riverina is an Australian Geographical Indication (AGI) registered in the Register of Protected GIs as a wine region. The Riverina AGI is centred on Griffith and is roughly circular with towns on the boundary including Mossgiel, Condobolin, Temora, Junee, Culcairn, Berrigan, Barooga, Finley, Deniliquin and Moulamein. It does not extend as far south as the Murray River. As such, the Riverina wine region is smaller than the generally known Riverina area.

The Riverina region relies heavily on the Murrumbidgee Irrigation Scheme, initiated between 1906 and 1912 by Sir Samuel McCaughey.

The Riverina region produces 60% of the grapes in New South Wales from over 20,000 hectares (49,000 acres) of vines, 25% of Australian wine.

== Riverina Wineries ==
- Baratto Wines
- Berton Vineyards
- Calabria Family Wines
- Casella Family Brands
- De Bortoli Wines
- Dee Vine Estate
- Lillypilly Estate
- McWilliams Family Winemakers
- Mino + Co
- Nugan Estate
- Piccolo Family Farm
- R.Paulazzo
- Toorak Wines
- Trimboli Family Wines
- Yarran Wines
