= Canberra District wine region =

Wine producing region in Australia

- Wine region
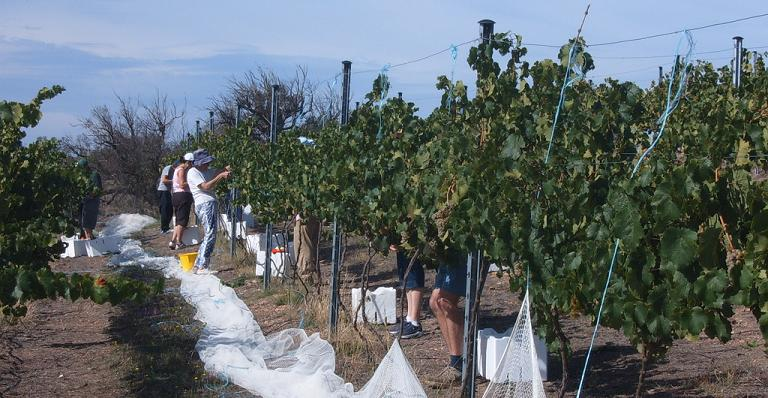
- Riesling being picked early, February 2007 (due to the drought in Australia)
- Type: Australian Geographical Indication
- Year established: 1998
- Country: Australia
- Part of: Southern New South Wales
- Location: 35°0′S 149°20′E
- Heat units: 1410
- Precipitation (annual average): 360 millimetres (14 in)
- Soil conditions: hard red duplex soil with shallow clay loam top soil
- Size of planted vineyards: 340 hectares (840 acres)
- Varietals produced: Shiraz, Riesling

The Canberra District wine region is located around Canberra in the Capital city of Australia. It covers the northern part of the Australian Capital Territory and an area of New South Wales to the east and north of that, including towns of Bungendore, Murrumbateman and Yass, New South Wales.

Wine is grown and produced in a triangular area of about 60 km sides bordered by Canberra, Yass, and Bungendore, taking in the important localities of Murrumbateman and Lake George. The district is noted as a cool-climate wine area, but encompasses a substantial climatic range, with the lower altitude and more inland regions near Yass substantially warmer than the higher altitude areas near Bungendore.

== History ==
The industry dates from the 1970s, although wines were produced in the settlement near Yass in the 1860s.

== Climate and geography ==
The region is part of the Southern Tablelands about 150 kilometres (93 mi) inland from the Pacific Ocean. The region receives moderate, but variable rainfall, and vineyards require supplemental irrigation in most years. Typical vineyard elevations range between 500 and 900 metres (1,600 and 3,000 ft), and the inland location result in relatively high continentality, possibly explaining the affinity for leading varieties Shiraz and Riesling. Promising recent results from Tempranillo may be explained by the strong homoclime to Ribera del Duero.

- Annual rainfall: 630 millimetres (25 in)
- Mean January (late growth period) temp: 20.2 °C (68.4 °F)
- Sunshine hours per day: 7.4

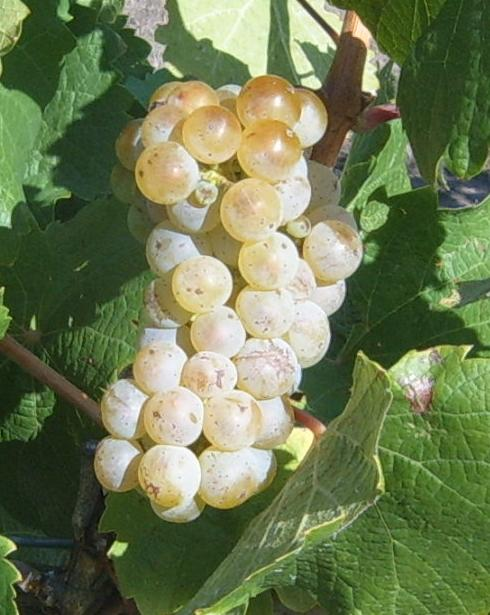
Riesling harvest, February 2007 (due to the drought in Australia.)

== Production ==
The main grape varieties grown are Riesling, Chardonnay, Sauvignon blanc, Sémillon, Cabernet Sauvignon, Shiraz, Viognier, Tempranillo, Pinot noir and Pinot gris. Picking and vintage extend from late February (Pinot noir, Chardonnay) to late May (botrytis Pinot gris or Riesling).

About two thirds of the vines are red wine varieties, and one third are white.

== See also ==
- Australian wine
