= Hilltops wine region =

Hilltops
- Wine region
- Type: Australian Geographical Indication
- Year established: 1998
- Country: Australia
- Part of: Southern New South Wales
- Location: 34°19′S 148°20′E
- Heat units: 1880
- Precipitation (annual average): 310 millimetres (12 in)
- Soil conditions: Free draining dark red granitic clay with basalt
- Size of planted vineyards: over 600 hectares (1,500 acres)
- Varietals produced: Cabernet Sauvignon
- No. of wineries: 12

Hilltops is an Australian Geographical Indication for a wine region in the Southern New South Wales zone of the state of New South Wales in Australia. It includes the main towns of Boorowa, Harden and Young.

The region has 600 hectares (1,500 acres) of vineyards, planted predominantly to red wine grapes. The vineyards are over 450 metres (1,480 ft) altitude, in dark red granitic clay with basalt.

The wine labels showcasing the diversity and quality of Hilltops region wines include Ballinaclash, Barwang Wines, Freeman Vineyards and Grove Estate. The region produces a wide diversity of styles from Prosecco and Pinot Grigio to Fiano, Chardonnay and rosé. Red wines range from Shiraz and Cabernet Sauvignon to Italian origin grapes including Sangiovese and Nebbiolo. Rarer grapes are also planted including Aleatico, Furmint and two reds – Corvina and Rondinella.
