= List of Australian pale-skinned wine grape varieties =

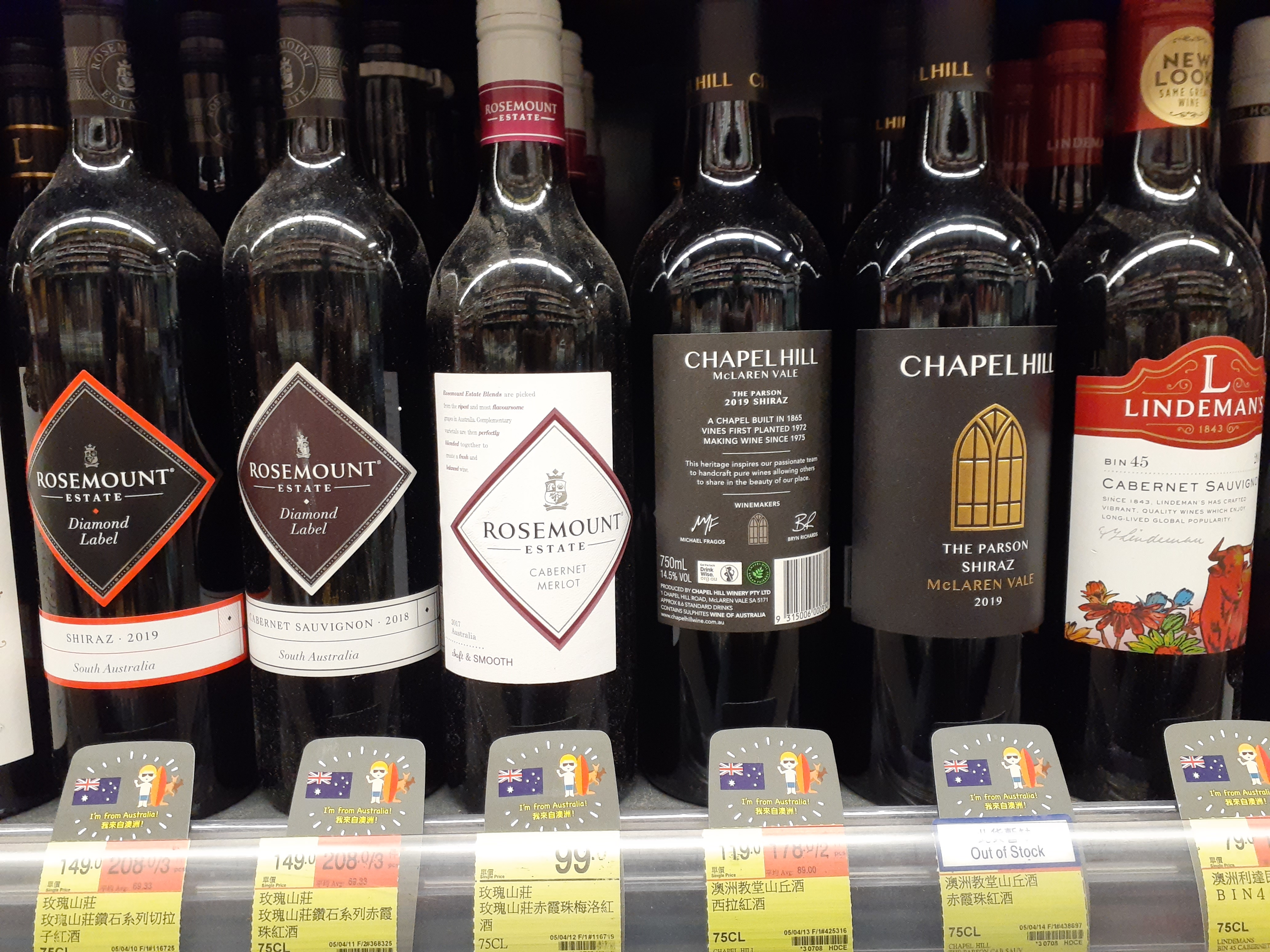
A selection of Australian varietals on sale in Hong Kong

Australia has over 160 grape varieties distributed on 146,244 hectares (ha) across all six states, South Australia, New South Wales, Victoria, Western Australia, Tasmania and Queensland (see Australian wine). These activities are concentrated largely in the southern part of the continent where the terroir - that is, soil types, local climate, availability of irrigation and so on - is suited to viticulture.

Together, the three sectors of the industry, grape growing, winemaking and wine tourism, play a major role in Australia's economy. In the 2018–2019 financial year, they contributed AU$45.5 billion to the national income. In addition, many other businesses benefit from the services they provide to the wine industry. (Note: A 1995 report to the Australian government summarised this: "Some cater exclusively for grapegrowers or wineries (eg harvesting contractors, bottling companies and fermentation equipment suppliers), but many also supply other industries in the region (although the wine industry may be their major customer). Included in this latter category are: transport companies; metal fabricators (eg manufacturers of stainless steel tanks); manufacturers of viticultural machinery; label manufacturers; suppliers of fertilisers and chemicals; consultants specialising in viticulture services; accounting and legal firms; and suppliers of packaging materials.")

== Abbreviations ==
- Colour of Berry Skin– B (blanc – white or yellow); Gr (grigio or gris – blue/grey to pale pink)
- FPS– Foundation Plant Service Grape Registry
- ha- hectare, a measurement of land area
- VIVC– Vitis International Variety Catalogue
- WA – Wine Australia
- WPG – Wein.Plus Glossary

== A–F ==
Grape	Color of Berry Skin	VIVC Variety No	Pedigree	Location - growers and makers	International homonyms and synonyms
Afus Ali (Note: Most often recognised for its contribution to the dried fruit industry, this variety's role as a wine grape is largely ignored. Yet according to a report from the Australian Bureau of Statistics for the period 1988-89, where it was listed under its name Waltham Cross, of a total output of 5,482 tonnes, 1,200 tonnes were sold as table grapes, 2,277 tonnes were used by the dried fruit industry, and 2,366 tonnes were directed to winemaking.)	B	122	Unknown	Murray Darling	Actoni, Actoni Maceron, Actoni Real, Aelibar Drenak, Aetoni Maceron, Afouz Ali, Afouz Aly, Afrus Ali, Afruz Ali, Afus Ali Hijeli, Afuz Ali, Afuz Ali Alb, Agrazaki, Alepo, Aleppo, Aleppoi Szoeloe, Aleppou, Alfons, Alfonse Ali, Allepo, Alltin Tas, Altan Tash, Altin Tas, Altin Tas Razaki, Anabolitiko, Anatoliko, Anatolitiko, Archaniotiko, Arkanoiotilo, Axiangelas, Axinangelus, Bayrout Hurmasi, Beirutska Urma, Beiruty Datolya, Bejrutska, Bejrutska Cilibarka, Bejrutska Urma, Belle Dorée, Beyroute Khourmassi, Beyrut Hurmasi, Beyrutska Smokva, Beyrutski Urmach, Bezzoul Kalba Bidha, Bezzoul Kelba El Bidha Sfaz, Boldon, Boldun, Bolgar, Bolgar Szölö, Bolgare, Bolgarszoeloe, Bolgarszolo, Caraburnou, Caraburnu, Carigradsko Grozde, Celibar Drenak, Celibar Drenk, Chafouz Ali, Chondrorogo, Cilibar, Cotico, Cottico, Daltatraube, Date Beirut, Date de Beirut, Date de Bejrut, Datier de Beyrouth, Datil de Beirut, Datilera, Datilera de Beirut, Datolya Szoeloe, Datteltraube, Dattero, Dattero di Beyrouth, Dattero di Negroponte, Dattier, Dattier de Beiroth, Dattier de Beyrouth, Datye de Beyrut, Delizia di Vaprio, Dimiski, Donna, Drenk Royal, Eleme, Galletta, Garaburnu, Geinovyi, Geroso, Gerosolomitana, Ginerva, Ginerva di Tivoli, Granito de Oro, Greco Napoletano, Grozderadsco, Hafez Ali, Hafiz Ali, Hafizali, Hafus-Ali, Hafuz Ali, Imperial, Imperiale, Insani, Insolia, Insolia Parchitana, Insolie Parchitana, Inzolia, Inzolia Imperiale, Iurum Iuzum, Izmir Razaki, Jerbi, Karabournou, Karaburnii, Karaburnu, Kararubun, Kerino, Maceron, Mamella de Vaca, Marinkovica Grozje, Markindi, Marsigliana Bianca, Marsiguiana Bianca, Medoni, Mena Vaca Blanca, Menavacca, Menavacca Bianca, Menna Vacca, Mennavacca, Mennavacca Bianca, Minna di Vacce Bianca, Nebi Dede, Parchitana, Pepita de Oro, Pergolana, Pergolona, Pergolona di Ortona, Pergolone, Provalone, Provolone, Qaraburnu, Radovaca, Raisin d'Or, Raisin de Constantinople, Raisin de Constantinopole, Rasaki, Rasaki di Rodi, Razacha Carmaz, Razachie Alba, Razachie de Dealul Mare, Razaki, Razaki Archanon, Razaki Aspro, RazakiBeyaz, Razakidi Rodi, Razaki Gelber, Razaki Isla de Creta, Razaki Kabalas, Razaki of Kavala, Razakisi Duelekkoy, Razakiya, Razaqui, Raziqi, Real, Redzhina, Regina, Regina Bianca, Regina Boianca di Firenze, Regina de Beyrouth, Regina della Malvasie, Regina di Puglia, Regina di Spagna, Regina Precocé, Regine, Reine, Rexhina, Rhajaki, Rhajaki Aspro, Rhazaki, Rhazaki Arhanon, Rhazaki Arkanon, Rosaki, Rosaki Blanco, Rosaki d'Anatolie, Rosaki Dorado, Rosaki Sari, Rosani, Roseti, Rosetti, Rosseti, Rozaki, Rozaki d'Anatolia, Rozaki de Dyalul Mare, Rozaki Sari, Rozakiya, Rozaky, Rozeti, Sam Razaki, Sareqradskiy, Sarga Lugas, Sarga Rozaki, Sarga Rumonya, Sasla Zamuska, Shasla Zamuschca, Shasla Zamushka, Smyrneiko, Smyrniko, Stambolese, Stamboleze, Sultanai Razaki, Sultani Razaki, Tamar Beyrouth, Tamar Chulata, Tamar Hulata, Tatarka Bela, Teneron de Vaucluse, Teramo, Teta de Vaca, Teta di Vaca, Tête de Vache, Tsaregradskij, Tsaregradsky, Tsarigradsko Grossde, Tzar na Grozdata, Tzarigradsko Grozde, Uirum, Uirum Iuzum, Uva Bianca di Serdiana 2, Uva del Vaticane, Uva del Vaticano, Uva di Constantinopla, Uva di S. Francesco, Uva di S. Francisco, Uva di San Francesco, Uva Donna, Uva Ghiotta, Uva Ghiotto, Uva Marchesa, Uva Real, Uva Regina, Uva Turca, Waltham Cross, Zeine, Zeini, Zhuta Razakiya, Zirnsko Belo
Albariño (Note: IIt is worth noting that in 2009 DNA profiling found that vines which had been planted in Australia as Albariño were actually Savagnin.)	B	As Alvarinho - 15689	Hunter Valley, Orange, Riverland, Rutherglen, South Burnett, Upper Goulburn	Albariña, Albariño, Albelleiro, Alvarin Blanco, Alvarinha, Alvarinho, Alvariño, Azal Blanco, Cainho Branco, Galego, Galeguinho, Padernã	
Aligoté	B	312	Gouais Blanc = Heunisch Weiß x Pinot Noir	King Valley, Margaret River, Mornington Peninsula	Aligote Bijeli, Aligotte, Alligotay, Alligoté, Alligotet, Beaunié, Beaunois, Carcairone Blanc, Chaudenet Gras, Giboulot, Giboudot, Griset Blanc, Mahranauli, Mukhranuli, Plant de Trois, Plant Gris, Troyen Blanc, Vert Blanc
Ansonica (See Inzolia					
Aranel	B	9314	Garnacha Roja x Saint-Pierre Doré	Riverina	
Arinto	B	602	Unknown	Barossa Valley, Heathcote, Margaret River, Riverland, Rutherglen	Assario Branco, Arintho, Arinto Cercial, Arinto d'Anadia, Arinto de Bucelas, Arinto Galego, Arintho, Azal Espanhol, Boal Cachudo, Chapeludo, Pedernã, Terrantez da Terceira, Torrontés
Arneis	B	626	Unknown	Adelaide Hills, Alpine Valleys, Barossa Valley, Bendigo, Canberra, Central Ranges, Clare Valley, Denmark, Eden Valley, Geelong, Geographe, Goulburn Valley, Hunter Valley, King Valley, McLaren Vale, Langhorne Creek, Mornington Peninsula, Mount Barker, Mudgee, Murray Darling, Orange, Perth Hills, Riverina, Riverland, Rutherglen, Shoalhaven Coast, Southern Highlands, Strathbogie Ranges, Tasmania North West, Yarra Valley	Bianchetta, Bianchetta di Alba, Bianchetto, Bianchetto di Verzuolo, Nebbiolo Bianco
Assyrtiko	B	726	Unknown	Clare Valley	Arcytico, Assirtico, Assyrtico, Asurtico, Asyrtico, Asyrtiko, Ασύρτικο, Atzala
Aucerot	B	792	Gouais Blanc = Heunisch Weiß x Pinot Noir	King Valley	Aukseroa Blan, Auxera, Auxerois, Auxerrois Bijeli, Auxerrois Blanc, Auxerrois Blanc de Laquenexy, Auxerrois Blanc von Laquenezy, Auxerrois de Laquenexy, Auxerrois Gris, Auxois, Auzerrois Blanc, Blanc de Kienzheim, Blanc de Laquenexy, Ericey de la Montée, Gelber Auxerrois, Kleiner Heunisch, Little Heisch, Oinot Auxerrois, Okseroa, Pinot Auxerois, Pinot Auxerrois, Pinot Blanc Precocé, Riesling Jaune de la Moselle, Weisser Auxerrois, White Auxerrois, Yellow Auxerrois
Baroque	B	1005	Unknown	North East Victoria	Baroca, Barroque, Barroque Blanc, Bordalès, Bordelais Blanc, Bordeleza Zuria
Bianco d'Alessano	B	1330	Unknown	Riverland	Acchiappapalmento, Achiappapalmento, Beretinjak, Beretinjok Bijeli, Bianco di Alessano, Bianco d'Assano, Bianco di Latiano, Bianco di Lessame, Bianco di Palmento, Bianco di Valdigna, Bretinjak, Butta Palmento, Iuvarello, Selvaggio, Tikvar, Tikvar Bijeli, Verdurino, Vuiono, Vuoino, Vuoiono
Biancone	White	1335	Sciacarello or Sciaccarello x ?	Rutherglen	Besgano Bianco, Besgano Bianco di Bobbio, Biancona, Biancone, Biancone di Portoferraio, Colombana Bianca, Corcesco, Folle Verte d'Oleron, Gragnolata, Gragnolato Blanco, Gragnolo Bianco, Grignola, Grignolato Bianco, Grignolino Bianco, Grignolo, Grignolo Bianco, Grignolo Bianco di San Colombano, Pagadebiti di Porto S. Stefano, Rollo, San Colombano Piccolo, Uva Biancona, Uva di Milano
Blanquette (See Clairette)					
Bourboulenc	B	1612	Gouais Blanc = Heunisch Weiß x ?	Barossa Valley, McLaren Vale	Asprokonoura, Asprokondura, Berlou Blanc, Blanquette, Blanquette du Frontonnais, Blanquette du Gard, Blanquette Menue, Bourbojlanc, Bourboulenco, Bourbelene, Bourbouleng, Bourboulenque, Bourbounenco, Burbulen, Clairete Dorée à Paulhan, Clairette à Grains Ronds, Clairette Blanche, Clairette Dorée, Clairette Grosse, Clairette Rousse, Clairette Rousse du Var, Claretta, Doucillon, Doucillon Blanc, Frappad, Grosse Clairette, Lou Pirouran, Malvoisie, Mourterille, Ondenc, Pé Comprido, Picardan, Roussaou, Roussette, Roussette du Vaucluse
Canada Muscat	B	2034	Muscat Hamburg = Black Muscat x Hubbard Seedless	McLaren Vale, Riverina	New York 17806, NY 17806
Cañocazo	B	2058	Hebén	Murray Darling, South Australia where its specific locations are unclear	Boujlida, Common Palomino, False Pedro, Hardskin, Hardskin Pedro, Hirsuta, Mollar Blanco, Pedro, Uva y Blando
Caverdella	B		Unknown	Riverina	
Cayetana Blanca	B	5648	Unknown	Granite Belt, Riverina, Riverland	Amor Blanco, Aujubi, Avesso do Minho, Baladi, Baladi-Verdejo, Balay, Belledy, Blanca Cayetana, Blanco Jaen, Blanquette of South Australia, Boal Carrasquenha, Boal Carrasquenho, Cagazal, Calagrano Blanc, Calagraño, Carrasquenho, Cayetana, Cazagal, Charello, Charelo, Chaselo, Cheres, Cirial, Dedo, Dedro, Djiniani, Dora, Doradillo, Farta Gosos, Garillo, Garrida, Garrido, Garriga, Garrilla, Hoja Vuelta, Jaén Blanco, Jaén Doradillo, Jaén Empinadillo, Jaén Prieto Blanco, Jaenes, Jaina, Jainas, Jarime, Jean de Castilla, Jean de Letur, Jean de Letur de Maratella, Jean Doradillo, Jean Doré, Jean Prieto, Machuenco, Maizancho, Malvasia, Malvoisie Espagnole, Mariouti, Morisca, Morisco, Mourisco Arsello, Mourisco Branco, Mourisco Portalegre, Naves, Naves Cazagal, Neruca, Padero, Parda, Pardilla, Pardina, Pirulet, Plateado, Plateadillo, Robal, Sarigo, Tierra de Barros, Verdeja, Virules, Xarello
Chardonnay	B	1929	Gouais Blanc = Heunisch x	Albany, Barossa Valley, Beechworth, Blackwood Valley, Central WA, Coal River Valley, Coonawarra, Cowra, Denmark, Derwent Valley, Darling Downs, Eden Valley, Ferguson Valley, Frankland River, Geographe, Gippsland, Gold Coast Hinterland, Granite Belt, Great Lakes, Great Southern, Hastings River, Henty, Hilltops, Hunter Valley, Huon/Channel, Kangaroo Island, Langhorne Creek, Lower Region, McLaren Vale, Macedon Ranges, Manjimup, Margaret River, Mount Benson, Mudgee, Murray Darling, Orange, Padthaway, Peel, Pemberton, Perricoota, Perth Hills, Pipers River, Pyrenees, Riverina, Riverland, South Burnett, Strathbogie Ranges, Southern Fleurieu, Swan District, Swan Hill, Tamar Valley, Tasmania East Coast, Tasmania North East, Tasmania North West, Tasmania Southern, Tumbarumba, Upper Goulburn, Yarra Valley	Aligote, Arboisier, Arnaison, Arnaison Blanc, Arnoison, Aubain, Aubaine, Auvergnat Blanc, Auvernas, Auvernas Blanc, Auvernat, Auvernat Blanc, Auxeras, Auxerras Blanc, Auxerrois Blanc, Auxois, Auxois Blanc, Bargeois Blanc, Bearnois, Beaunois, Biela Klevanjika, Blanc de Bonne Nature, Blanc de Champagne, Blanc de Cramant, Blanc de Breisgauer Süßling, Blanca del Pais, Bon Blanc, Breisgauer, Breisgauer Süßling, Breisgauer Sußling, Burgunder Weißer, Burgundi Feher, Chablis, Chardenai, Chardenay, Chardenet, Chardennet, Chardennet de Chablis, Chardennay de Pouilly, Chardonais, Chardonay, Chardonet, Chardoney, Chardonet, Chardonnay, Chardonnay Bjieli, Chardonnet, Chatenait, Chatey Petit, Chatte, Chaudenay, Chaudenet, Chaudent, Clävner, Clevner, Clevner Weiß, Cravner, Dannerie, Danserrie d'Arnaison, d'Arnoison, d'Auvernat Blanc, d'Epinette, Epinette, Epinette Blanc, Epinette Blanche, Epinette de Champagne, Ericey, Ericey Blanc, Fehér Chardonnay, Fehérburgundi, Feinburgunder, Fin Plant Dore, Gamay Blanc, Gelber Schimber, Gelber Schimper, Gelber Weissburgunder, Gentil Blanc, Greco, Gros Blanc, Grosse Bourgogne, Gruendel, Klawner, Kleinedel, Kleiner Heinsch, Klevanjka Biela, Klevner, Klingelberger Grosser, Lisant, Luisant, Luiza, Luizannais, Luizant, Luzannois, Maconnais, Maurillon Blanc, Melier, Melon, Melon Blanc, Melon d'Arbois, Melon du Jura, Melona Queue Rouge, Meroué, Meunier Blanc, Moreau Blanc, Moreote Blanche, Morillon Blanc, Moulan, Moulon, Muscadet, Noiren Blanc, Noirien Blanc, Noirien Blanc Chardonnay, Obaideh, Petit Chantey, Petite Sainte Marie, Petite Sainte-Marie, Petit Sainte-Marie, Pineau Blanc, Pineau Blanc Chardonnay, Pino Plan Shardone, Pino Sardone, Pino Shardone, Pinot Bianco Chardonnay, Pinot Blanc Chardonnay, Pinot Chardonnay, Pinot Blanc à Cramant, Pinot Blanc Chardonnay, Pinot Chardonnay, Pinot de Bourgogne, Pinot Giallo, Pinot Planc, Plant de Breze, Plant de Tonnerre, Plant Doré, Plant Doré Blanc, Plant Doré de Champagne, Rolänner, Romere, Romeret, Rouci Bile, Rousseau, Roussette, Roussot, Ruländer, Ruländer Weiß, Rullenner, Sainte-Marie-Petite, Sardone, Shardone, Shardonne, Später Weiß Burgunder, Suessling, Trappling, Veis Edler, Veiser Klevner, Vitis Aurelianensis Acinic Crni, Wais Edler, Weiß Arbs, Weiß Burgunder (Normally refers to Pinot Blanc), Weiß Clevner, Weiß Cloevner, Weiß Edler, Weiß Elder, Weiß Klewner, Weiß Silber, Weißedler, Weißarbst, Weißarbst Rolander, Weißeklävler, Weißer Burgunder, Weißer Clävner, Weißer Clevner, Weißer Klävner, Weißer Rohlander, Weißer Rolander, Weißer Ruhländer, Weißer Rulander, Weißgelber Clävner, Weißgelber Klevner, Weißklävner, Weißklevner, White Burgundy, Yellow Burgundy
Chasselas Blanc	B	2473	Unknown	Grampians (Note: Kerridge and Antcliff reported that there were about 100 ha of Chasselas in Australia with half of them in Victoria and the remainder in New South Wales and Western Australia. The only specific location they mentioned was Merbein in the Murray Darling Region (presumably meaning the former CSIRO Research Station). Having referred to Kerridge and Antcliff, Halliday added in the same sentence that "the Grampians was home to most." But as he concluded, "It [ie Chasselas] now has a more ephemeral presence.")	Abelione, Abellione, Abelone, Ag Shasla, Albillo, Albilloidea, Alloy, Alsacia Blanca, Amber Chasselas, Amber Muscadine, Amiens, Aube, Auslender, Bai Sha Si La, Bar sur Aube, Bar sur Aube Blanc, Bar sur Auhe, Bassiraube, Bela Glera, Bela Sasla, Bela Žlahtnina, Berezka, Berezka Prostaja, Berezka Prostaya, Berioska Casla, Beyaz Gutedel, Biela Plemenika Praskava, Piela Plemenka, Biela Plemincka Chrapka, Biela Plemincka Pruskava, Biela PlemiBiela Plemenka, Blanchette, Blanc Lafitte, Blanquette, Bois Rouge, Bon Blanc, Bordo, Bou Afrara, Bournet, Bournot, Branquete, Buaki, Burda, Campanella Bianca, Castellana Blanca, Ceasla, Charapka, Chassel du Cap Breton, Chasselas, Chasselas à Bois Rouge, Chasselas Angevin, Chasselas Aurie, Chasselas Bianco, Chasselas Blanc, Chasselas Blanc de Thomery, Chasselas Blanc Royal, Chasselas Blanchette, Chasselas Cioutat, Chasselas Commun, Chasselas Crognant, Chasselas Croquant, Chasselas d'Aubin du Doubs, Chasselas de Bar sur Aube, Chasselas de Barde Montauban, Chasselas de Bordeaux, Chasselas de Florence, Chasselas de Fontainebleau, Chasselas de Jalabert, Chasselas de la Contrie, Chasselas de la Naby, Chasselas de la Redoute, Chasselas de Moissac, Chasselas de Montauban, Chasselas de Montauban à Grains Transparent, Chasselas de Mornain, Chasselas de Pondichéry, Chasselas de Pontchartrain, Chasselas de Pouilly, Chasselas de Quercy, Chasselas de Rappelo, Chasselas de Tenerife, Chasselas de Teneriffe, Chasselas de Thomeri, Chasselas de Thomery, Chasselas de Thomery, Chaselas de Toulaud, Chasselas de Tours, Chasselas de Vaud, Chasselas di Fountanbleau, Chasselas di Thomery, Chasselas Dorada, Chasselas Dorato, Chasselas Doré, Chasselas Doré de Bar sur Aube, Chasselas Doré de Bordeaux, Chasselas Doré de Fontainbleau, Chasselas Doré Hatif, Chasselas Doré Salomon, Chasselas du Doubs, Chasselas du Portugal, Chasselas du Roi, Chasselas du Serail, Chasselas du Thor, Chasselas Dugommier, Chasselas Dur, Chasselas Fendant, Chasselas Fendant Roux, Chasselas Giclet, Chasselas Hatif de Tenerife, Chasselas Hatif de Teneriffe, Chasselas Haute Selection, Chasselas Jalabert, Chasselas Jaune Cire, Chasselas Jaune de la Drôme, Chasselas Musqué, Chasselas Piros, Chasselas Plant Droit, Chasselas Precocé de Teneriffe, Chasselas Queen Victoria, Chasselas Reine Victoria, Chasselas Rousard, Chasselas Salsa, Chasselas Tokay Angevine, Chasselas Vert de la Cote, Chasselas White, Chasselat, Chelva, Chenel, Chenin Blanc, Chrapka, Chrupka, Chrupka Biela, Chrupka Bílá, Chrupka Červená, Chrupka Fialová, Chrupka Petržlenová, Chrupka Petrželová. Chrupka Muškátová, Chrupka Ružová, Chrupka Ušľachtilá, Cibade, Clairette, Clairette Blanche, Clairette de Limoux, Clairette Pointue, Colle Musquette, Common Muscadine, Côte Rouge, Cotticour, D'Arbois, D'Arboyce, Dachtraube, Danka Belaya, Debrorozone, Dinka Belaya, Dinka Blanche, Dobrorozne, Doppelte Spanische, Dorianer, Dorin, Doucet, Dreixle, Early White Teneriffa, Early Teneriffe, Eau Douce Blanche, Edelschön, Edelwayn, Edelwein, Edelweisß, Edelxeiss, Elba Toro, Elsässer, Elsasser Weiß, Fabian, Fabian Szölö, Fabianszölö, Fabiantraube, Febian Popogós, Feder Ropoos, Fehér Chasselas, Fehér Clairette, Fehér Fabianszölö, Fehér Gyöngyszőlő, Fehér Ropogós, Fehér Ropogós Fabian, Fehér Ropoos, Fehér Ropoos, Fehér Ropoos Fabian, Fehér Ropvos Fabian, Fendant, Fendant Blanc, Fendant Roux, Fendant Vert, Florenci Jouana, Fondan Belyi, Franceset, Franceseta, Frauen Traube, Frauentraube, Gaillard Blanc, Gamet, Gelber Gutedel, Gemeiner Gutedel, Gentil Blanc, Gentil Vert, Gerezka, Giclet, Golden Bordeaux, Golden Chasselas, Granolata, Großblättrige, Großblättrige Spanische, Grosse Spanische, Grosser Spaniger, Grüner Gutedel, Gutedel, Gutedel Pariser, Gutedel Weiß, Gutedel Weisser, Gutedler, Gyöngyszőlő, Gyöngyzőlő, Junker, Kapucinske, Kleret, Kleret Belyi, Königs Gutedel, Kracher, Krach Gutedel, Krachgutedel, Krachmost, Krachmoster, Lacrima Christi Rose, Lardat, Lardeau, Lardot, Lausannois, Lendant Blanc, Lourdet, Lourdot, Maïsa, Malvasia, Malvasia de El Bierizo, Markgräfler, Marleuche, Marnan Blanc, Marzemina, Marzemina Bianca, Marzemina Niduca, Meuter, Moren, Morlenche, Mornan Blanc, Mornant, Mornant Blanc, Mornen, Mornen Blanc, Moscatello, Most, Most Rebe, Moster, Moster Süßling, Mosmatt, Muealicevi, Sasla, Muscade, Muscadine, Ondenic, Osianka, Ovsyanka, Pariser Gutedel, Pearl, Perlan, Perltraube, Petit Blanc, Petit Kleret, Pinzutella, Plamenka, Plamenka Belyi, Plamenka Bijela, Plant de Toulard, Plant de Toulaud, Plemenika Praskava, Plemenka, Plemenka Bela, Plemenka Bijela, Plemenka Raba, Plemenka Rana, Pleminka Biela, Poupe de Gate, Praskava, Pruscava Biela, Pruskawa, Pti Blan d’Obena, Queen Victoria, Queen Victoria White, Raisin d'Arbois, Raisin d'Arboyce, Raisin d'Officier, Raisin de Champagne, Ranka, Rdeča Žlahtnina, Rebe Herrn Fuchses, Reben Herm Fuchs, Reben Herrn, Rheinrebe, Rosmarinentraube, Rosmarintraube, Rostroter Gutedel, Rougeasse, Royal Muscadine, Rozmarintraube, Sasla, Sasla Aurul, Sasla Bela, Sasla Belaja, Sasla Bjala, Sasla Doré, Sasla Lecegnaja, Sasla Zlatista, Sasla Zolotistaja, Saszla, Schönedel, Seidentraube, Shashla, Shasla, Shasla Belaya, Shasla Doré, Shasla Lechebnaya, Shasla Medicinal, Shasla Viktoria, Shasla White, Shasla Zolotistaya, Silberling, Silberling Plemenka Rana, Silberweiß, Silberweißling, Silberwisli, Silberwißling, Spanielske, Strapak, Süßling, Süßling Krächelnder, Süß Traube, Süßtraube, Sweetwater, Sweetwater White, Tafeltraube Rolf, Temprana Agostena, Temprana Media, Temprana Tardía, Tempranillo de Nav, Temprano, Temprano Blanco, Terravin, Tianshui, Tibiano Tedescho, Traslador, Trebbiano Cococciola, Treixle, Tribi Vognoble, Tribianco Tedesco, Tribiano Tedesco, Ugne, Uslechtile Bile, Uva Gijona, Uva Salsa, Valais, Valais Blanc, Viala, Vigne de Perse, Viviser, Vivsyanka Clairette Ronde, Wälische, Wälsche, Wälscher, Walischer, Weiser Gutedel, Weißer Burgunder, Weißer Gutedel, Weißer Junker, Weißer Krachgutedel, Weißer Muskateller, Weißer Tokayer, Welsche, White Chasselas, White Muscadine, White Nice, White Sweetwater, White Van der Laan, Žlahtina, Žlahtnina, Žlahtnina Bigela, Žlahtnina Bijela, Žlatina, Župljanka
Chenin Blanc	B	2527	Savagnin Blanc = Traminer x ?	Adelaide Hills, Barossa Valley, Central Western Australia, Clare Valley, Denmark, Frankland River, Geelong, Geographe, Goulburn Valley, Greater Perth, King Valley, Langhorne Creek, McLaren Vale, Margaret River, Murray Darling, Peel, Pemberton, Perricoota, Perth Hills, Pyrenees, Queensland Zone, Riverina, Riverland, Rutherglen, Sunbury, Swan District, Swan Hill, Swan Valley	Agudelo, Agudillo, Anjou, Blamancep, Blanc d'Anjou, Blanc d'Aunis, Blanc Emery, Blanc Legitimo, Bon Blanc, Canton, Capbreton Blanc, Chenen Belyi, Chenin, Chenin Beli, Chenin Bijeli, Confort, Coué Fort, Cruchinet, Cugnette, Fehér Chenin, Franc Blanc, Franche, Gamay Blanc, Gout Fort, Gros Chenin, Gros Pineau, Gros Pineau de Vouvray, Luarskoe, Mançais Blanc, Pera, Pineau Blanc, Pineau d'Anjou, Pineau de Briollay, Pineu de la Loire, Pineau de Savennières, Pineau de Vouvray, Pinot de la Loire, Pineau Gros, Pineau Gros de Vouvray, Pineau Nantais, Pineau Vert, Pinet d'Anjou, Pinot Blanco, Pinot d'Anjou, Pinot de la Loire, Pinot Gros de Vouvray, Plant d'Anjou, Plant de Breze, Plant de Clair de Lune, Plant de Maille, Plant de Salces, Plant de Salles, Plant du Clair de Lune, Plant Volé, Pointu de Savennières, Que Fort, Quéfort, Rajoulain, Rajoulin, Ronchalin, Rouchalin, Rouchelein, Rouchelin, Rougelin, Rousselin, Rouxalin, Rouzoulenc, Senin, Steen, Stein, Tête de la Crabe, Tite de Crabe, Ugne Lombarde, Vaalblaar Stein, Verdot de Montluçon, Verdurant, White Pinot
Clairette	B	As Clairette Blanche - 2695	Unknown	Barossa Valley, Hunter Valley, McLaren Vale, Yarra Valley	AG Cleret, AG Kleret, Blanc Laffite, Blanca Extra, Blanco Extra, Blanket, Blanquette, Blanquette de Limoux, Blanquette du Midi, Blanquette Velue, Bon Afrara, Bou Afrara, Clairet, Clairette Blanche, Blanquete, Caviorna, Cibade, Clairet, Clairette d'Aspiran, Clairette de Limoux, Clairette de Trans, Clairette di Francia, Clairette Pointue, Clairette Pouchudo, Clairette Pounchoudo, Clairette Verte, Claretta, Claretta Bianca, Clarette, Claretto di Francia, Cleretta Bianca, Clerette, Colle Musquette, Cotticour, Extra, Extra Blanco, Fehér Clairette, Fehér Kleret, Gaillard Blanc, Granolata, Klaret Belyi, Klaretto Bianko, Kleret, Kleret Belii, Kleret Belyi, Kleret de Limu, Muscade, Oeillade Blanche, Osianka, Osyanka, Ousianka, Ovsyaika, Ovsyanca, Ovsyanka, Petit Blanc, Petit Kleret, Petit Clairette, Picapoll, Picapoll Blanco, Picapolla Blanca, Picapollo, Picapouya, Pignola Bianca, Piquepoul, Poupe de Gate, Pti Blan d'Obena, Seidentraube, Shalos Zolotistyi, Uva de Jijona, Uva Gijona, Vivsianka, Vivsyanca, Vivsyanka
Colombard	B	2771	Gouais Blanc = Heunisch x Chenin Blanc	Adelaide Plains, Central Ranges, Gold Coast Hinterland, Granite Belt, King Valley, Lower Murray, Murray Darling, Riverina, Riverland, Swan Hill, Swan Valley, Yarra Valley	Bardero, Blanc Emery, Blanquette, Bon Blanc, Chabrier Vert, Charbrier Vert, Colombar, Colombard Bijeli, Colombeau, Colombie, Colombier, Coulombier, Cubzadais, Donne Rousse, Donne Verte, French Colombard, Gros Blanc Doux, Gros Blanc Roux, Guenille, Kolombar, Martin Côt, Pied Tendre, Quene Tendre, Quene Vert, Queue Tendre, Queue Verte, Semilão, Tourterelle, West's White Prolific
Cortese	B	2856	Unknown	Adelaide Hills, Adelaide Plains, Upper Goulburn	Bianca Fernanda, Corteis, Cortese Bianca, Cortese Bianco, Cortese d'Asti, Cortese dell'Astigliano, Courteis, Courteisa, Courtesia, Fernanda Bianca, Raverusto
Crouchen	B	3264	Unknown	Clare Valley, King Valley, Swan Hill	Basque, Cape Riesling, Clare Riesling, Cougnet, Crochenta, Crouchen Blanc, Cruchen Blanc, Cruchenta, Cruchenton Blanc, Grand Blanc, Groenblaarsteen, Hondarribi Zuri, Kaapse Riesling, Messange Blanc, Messanges Blanc, Navarre Blanc, Paarl Riesling, Riesling Vert, Sable Blanc, Sales Blanc, SA Riesling, South African Riesling, Trouchet Blanc, Zurizerratia
Cygne Blanc	B	24153	A selfing of Cabernet Sauvignon (Note: Grown by Western Australian winemakers Dorham Mann and Doris Elsie Mann.)	Mount Benson, Swan Valley	
Doradillo (See Cayetana Blanca)					
Ehrenfelser	B	3847	Riesling x Knipperlé	Coal River Valley	Geisenheim 9-93
Fiano	B		Unknown	Adelaide Hills, Alpine Valleys, Barossa Valley, Central Ranges, Clare Valley, Geelong, Geographe, Granite Belt, Great Southern, Heathcote, Hilltops, Hunter Valley, King Valley, Langhorne Creek, McLaren Vale, Margaret River, Mornington Peninsula, Mudgee, Murray Darling, Orange, Perth Hills, Queensland Zone, Riverland, Rutherglen, Swan Valley, Yarra Valley	Apiana, Apiano, Fiana, Fiano di Avellino, Fiore Mendillo, Foiano, Latina Bianca, Latina Bianca di Barletta, Latino, Latino Bianco, Minutola, Minutolo, Santa Sofia
Fragola	B	14541	Unknown	Alpine Valleys, Hastings River, Margaret River, Murray Darling, Sunbury	
Frontignac (See Muscat Blanc à Petits Grains)					
Fumé Blanc (See Sauvignon Blanc)					
Furmint	B	4292	Alba Imputotato x Gouais Blanc = Heunisch	Grampians Margaret River	Allgemeiner, Arany Furmint, Beregi Furmint, Bieli Moslavac, Biharboros, Bihari Boros, Budai Goher, Cimigera, Scapfner, Csillagviraga Furmint, Damzemy, Dejmén, Domjén, Edelweißer Tokayer, Edler Weißer Tokayer, Edlerweißer, Erösimi, Fehér Furmint, Formint, Formont, Fourminte, Furmin, Furmint Bianco, Furmint Blanc, Furmint de Minis, Furmint Fegihér, Furmint Fehér, Furmint Giallo, Furmint Jaune, Furminy Szagos, Furmint Valtozo, Furmint Yellow, Furminth, Galbena, Gelber Moßler, Gelber Moster, Gemeiner, Görgény, Görgény, Görin, Goher Fehér, Gorin, Grasa de Kotnar, Holyagos Furmint, Jardanski Furmint, Johannistraube Vorzügliche, Kéknyali, Kéknyelü, Keltertraube, Kereszteslevelu Furmint, Kiraly Furmint, Krhkopetec, Lazafürtü Furmint, Ligetes Furmint, Luttenberger, Madarkas Furmint, Mainak, Maljak, Malmsey, Malnik, Malvasia Verde, Malvoisie Verte, Malzak, Mehlweiß, Moscavac Bijeli, Moscovec, Moslavac, Moslavac Bijeli, Moslavac Žuti, Moslavina, Moslawina, Mosler, Mosler Gelb, Mosler Gelber, Mosler Gross, Mosler Traube, Mosler Weiß, Moslevetz, Moslovac, Moslovac Bijeli, Moslovec, Moslovez, Némés Furmint, Poan Grasa, Poma Grasa, Pošip, Pošipel, Pošipon, Pošpisel, Pušipel, Rongyos Furmint, Salver, Sari Furmint, Sauvignon Vert, Schimiger, Schippon, Schmieger, Seestock, Seeweinbeere, Shipo, Shipon, Shiponski, Silinger, Sipeli, Šipely, Šipo, Šipon, Šiponski, Šiposski, Smiger, Som, Som Šhipo, Somszölö, Szala, Szalai, Szalai János, Szalay, Szalay Göreny, Szegszölö, Szegzölö, Szigethy Szölö, Szigeti, Toca, Toca Tokai, Tokai Krupnyi, Tokaiskii, Tokaisky, Tokauer, Tokay, Tokayer, Ungarische, Változó Furmint, Vigalyos Furmint, Weißer Landstock, Weißer Mosler, Weißerfrankenthaler, Weißlaber, Weißlabler, Weißlauber, Zapfete, Zapfner, Zappner, Zopfner

== G–L ==
Grape	Color of Berry Skin	VIVC Variety No	Pedigree	Location - growers and makers	International homonyms and synonyms
Garganega	B	4419	Unknown	Barossa Valley, Goulburn Valley, McLaren Vale, North East Victoria, Queensland Zone	Decanico, Dorana di Venetia, Garganega Bijela, Garganega Comune, Garganega di Gambellara, Garganega Gentile, Garganega Grossa, Garganega Piramidale, Garganega Veronese, Grecanico, Grecanico Bianco, Grecanico Dorato, Grecenicu Biancu, Lizzara, Malvasia de Manresa, Ostesa, Ostesona, Recanicu
Gordo (See Muscat of Alexandria)					
Gouais Blanc	B	As Heunisch Weiß - 5374	Unknown	Rutherglen	Absenger, Bauernweinbeer, Bauernweinbeer Weiße, Bauernweintraube, Belina, Belina Debela, Belina Domaca, Belina Drobna, Belina Krupna, Belina Moslavacka, Belina Pikasta, Belina Stara, Belina Starinska, Belina Starohrvatska, Belina Velika Bijela, Belina Welka, Belina Žuta, Bellina, Best's No 4, Bettschisser, Blanc de Serres, Blanció, Boarde, Bogatyur, Bon Blanc, Bordenauer, Borzenauer, Bouillan, Bouillaud, Bouilleaud, Bouillen, Bouillenc, Bourgeois, Bourguignon, Branco Gigante, Branco Valente, Branestraube, Braun, Braun Traube, Braune, Braunestraube, Burgegger, Burgegger Weißer, Burger, Cagnou, Shampagner Langstielig, Colle, Coulis, Dickwiß, Dickweiße, Dickweißer, Elbe Saurer, Enfariné Blanc, Esslinger, Fejér Szölö, Figuier, Foirard, Foirard Blanc, Frankenthaler, Gau, Gauche Blanc, Gemeine Weiße Traube, Geuche Blanc, Gigante, Gigante Branco, Goe, Goet, Goez, Gohet, Goi, Goin, Goix, Gôt, Gouai, Gouais, Gouais Jaune, Gouche, Gouche Blanche, Goue, Gouest, Gouest Sauge, Gouet Blanc, Gouette, Gouge, Gouget Blanc, Gouillaud, Gouis de Mardeuil, Gousse, Goys, Graubünsch, Grauhünsch, Grises Blanc, Grobe, Grober Saurer, Grobes, Grobes Saures, Grobheunisch, Grobwein, Grobweiße, Grobweißer, Gros Blanc, Grünling, Guache, Gueche Blanc, Guest Salviatum, Gueuche Blanc, Guilan, Guillan, Guinlan, Guy, Guy Blanc, Gwäss, Hänisch, Hajnos, Harthünsch, Hartünsch, Heinisch, Heinish, Heinsch, Heinschen, Heinschen Weiß, Hensch, Hentschler, Heunisch, Heunisch Blanc, Heunisch Weißer, Heunischen Grüne, Heunischer, Heunischtraube, Heunish Weiß, Heunsch, Heinschen, Heunscher, Heunschler, Heunschlir, Hinschen, Hinschene, Hintsch, Hünsch, Hünschene, Hüntsch, Hunnentraub, Hunsch, Hünsch, Hunschrebe, Huntsch, Hynsch, Hyntsch, Isidora Nobilis, Isidortraube Edle, Issal, Issol, Kleinbeer, Kleinberger, Kleinberger Saurer, Krapinska Belina, Laxiertraube, Liseiret, Lisoera, Lisora, Lissora, Lombard Blanc, Luxiertraube, Malvasir, Mehlweiß, Mehlweiße, Mehlweiße Grün, Mendic, Moreau Blanc, Mouillet, Nargouet, Pendrillart Blanc, Perveiral, Perveiral Bianco, Petit Gouge, Pichons, Pikanina Bijela, Plant de Séchex, Plant Madame, Plant Séche, Président, Preveiral, Preveiral Bianco, Preveiral Blanco, Proveiral, Provereau Blanc, Pruvera, Quadler, Rebula Old, Regula Stara, Regalaboue, Riesling Grob, Rous Hette, Roussaou Blanc, Rudeca Belina, Saboule Boey, Sadoulo Bouyer, Scheißtraube, Schilcher, Seestock Grob, Stajerska Belina, Stara Hrvatska Belina, Stock Deutscher, Thalburger, Thalburger Grünling, Trompe Bouvier, Trompe Valet, Valente, Valente Branco, Verdet, Verdin Blanc, Vionnier, Vitis Cathartica, Weinstock Deutscher, Weiße Ächte, Weiße Gemeine, Weiße Grob, Weiße Ordinaere, Weiße Traube, Weißer Hainisch, Weißer Heunisch, Weißer Zapfner, Weißgrobe, Weißheinisch, Weißstock, Weißtock, Wellina, Wippacher, Wolschestraube, Zapfner Weißer, Zöld Hajnos
Greco Bianco di Tufo (Note: Not to be confused with the variety called Greco (to which it is not related) as well as several other varieties whose synonyms are Greco.)	B	4970	Unknown	Adelaide Hills, Barossa Valley, Granite Belt, Heathcote, Langhorne Creek, Murray Darling, Pyrenees, Riverland, Western Plains, Yarra Valley	Ceppaloni, Fontana, Greca Napolitana, Greco, Greco del Vesuvio, Greco della Torre, Greco delle Torre, Greco di Napoli, Greco di Somma, Greco di Sona, Greco di Tufo, Grecula, Grieco, San Giorgio del Sannio
Grenache Gris (Note: Although this variety is defined as a white grape, in Australia it is being used to produce red and pink blends.)	Gr	As Garnacha Roja - 4980	A color mutation of Garnacha Tinta	Barossa Valley	Garnacha Gris, Garnacha Rioja, Garnacho Rojo, Garnatxa Gris, Garnatxa Roja, Gray Grenache, Grenache Gris, Grenache Rouge, Piros Grenache, Rosco dos Pinheiro, Szürke Grenache
Grillo	B	502	Catarratto Bianco Lucido x Muscat of Alexandria	Adelaide Hills, Barossa Valley, McLaren Vale	Ariddu, Riddu, Rossese Bianco
Grüner Veltliner	B	As Veltliner Grün - 12930	? x Savagnin Blanc = Traminer	Adelaide Hills, Alpine Valleys, Canberra, Clare Valley, Eden Valley, McLaren Vale, Hilltops, Langhorne Creek, Macedon Ranges, Mount Benson, Orange, Robe, Tasmania Southern, Tamar Valley, Tumbarumba, Upper Goulburn	Bielospicak, Cima Bianca, Cimaverde, Dreimänner, Falkensteiner, Fehérhegyü, Feldlinger, Grauer Veltliner, Green Valtellina, Green Veltliner, Grün Muskateller, [:ru:Грюн Мускателлер], Grüne Manhardsrebe, Grüner, Grüner Muskateler, Grüner Muskateller, Grüner Velteliner, Grüner Veltliner, [:ru:Грин Велтлинер], [:ru:Гроер Велтлинер], GrünerWeißgipfler, Grünmuskateller, GrüVe, GV, Manhardsrebe, Manhardtraube, Manhartsrebe, Mauhardsrebe, Mouhardrebe, Mouhardsrebe, Muškátel, Muškátel Zelený, Plinia Austriaca, Ranfol Bianco, Ranfol Bijeli, Ranfol Weißer, Rdeci Veltinec, Reifler Weiß, [:ru:Рейфлер Вайс], Ryvola Bila, Tarant Bily, Valtelin Blanc, Valtelina Vert, Valteliner, Valteliner Blanc, [:ru: Велтлинер grau], Valteliner Vert, [:ru:Велтелинер Грюнер], Velteliner Grüner, [:ru:Велтлинер Грунер], [:ru:Фелтлинер Грюн], [:ru:Велтлинер Верде], Velteliner Gruner, Velteliner Vert, Veltlinac Zeleni, Veltlinec, Veltliner, Veltliner Blanc, Veltliner Grün, Veltliner Grüner, Veltliner Verde, Veltelini Zöld, Veltlin Zelený, Veltinac Zeleni, Veltlinec, Veltlini, Veltlínské Zelené, Veltlínskí Zelenií, [:ru:Вельтлинский Зелении], Veltlinsky Vert, Veltlinsky, Zelený, Vetlinac, Vetlinac Zelený, Weißer, Weiśer Raifler, Weißer Reifler, Weißer Velteliner, Weißer Veltliner, Weißgipfler (Second main name), Weißgipfler Grüner, Welteliner Weißer, Yesil Veltliner, Zeleni Veltinec, Zeleni Veltlinec, Zeleni Vetlinac, Zelený Muškátel, Zelený Veltinac, Zöld Muskotály, Zöld Muskotálly, Zöld Muskotálynak, Zöld Veltelini, Zöld Velteliny, Zöldveltelini
Hárslevelű	B	As Harslevelue = 5314	Furmint x Tsimlyanskii Belyi	Hilltops, Manjimup	Budai Fehér, Budai Goher, Feuille de Tilleul, Feuilles de Tilleul, Frinza de Tei, Frunze de Tei, Gars Levelyu, Garsh Levelyu, Garsleveliu, Garsz Lelevju, Gorsh Levelyu, Hachat Lovelin, Harch Levelu, Harchlevelu, Hárs Levelu, Hárs Levelü, Hárs Levelyu, Hárslevele, Hársleveleü, Hárslevelu, Hárslevelü, Hárst Levelyu, Hárzevelu, Hosszunyelü Fehér, Kerekes, Kereklevelü, Lämmerschwanz, Lämmerschwanz Weißer, Lindenblatrige, Lindenblättrige, Lindenblättriger, Lindenblütrige, Lindner, Lipolist, Lipolist Biyali, Lipovina, Lipovnina Bijela, Musztafer, Nöthab, Tarpai, Teisor, Tokai, Tokay, Vörös, Weißer
Inzolia	B	42210	Unknown	Barossa Valley, Murray Darling	Ansolia, Ansolica, Ansoliku, Ansonica, Ansonica Bianca, Ansora, Ansorica, Anzonica, Insolia, Insolia di Palermo, Insora, Nzolia, Zolia Bianca
Kerner	B	6123	Trollinger x Riesling Weiß	Barossa Valley, Eden Valley, Murray Darling	Herold Triumpf, Kerner Bijeli, Kernerrebe, Trollinger x Riesling Renano WE S 25/30, WE S 2530, Weinsberg S 25, Weißer Herold (Original name)
Lexia (See Muscat of Alexandria)					

== M–R ==
Grape	Color of Berry Skin	VIVC Variety No	Pedigree	Location - growers and makers	International homonyms and synonyms
Macabeo	B	As Viura - 13127	Hebén x Brustiano faux	Riverland	Charas Blanc, Gredelin, Lardot, Macabeu, Maccabéo, Maccabeu, Ugni Blanc, Viura, Vuera
Madeleine Angevine (Note: Not to be confused with Madeleine Angevine Oberlin, an offspring of Madeleine Angevine, nor the UK variety Madeleine x Angevine 7672 or Madeleine Angevine 7627 which, misleadingly, is often referred to in the UK as Madeleine Angevine.)	B	7062	Blanc d'Ambre x Madeleine Royale	Swan Valley	Äugstler Weiß, Anjuy's Madlen, Anjuy's Magdalena, Azhupskaja Mladenka, Chasselas de Talhouet, Juliusi Magdolna, Korai Magda, Kossuth Traube, Kossuthtraube, Maddalena Angevina, Madelaine Angevine, Madlen Anževin, Madlen Anzhuiskaya, Madleine Celine, Madlen Angevine, Madlen Anjevin, Madlen Anjuyskaya, Madlen Anzhevin, Madlen Anzhuiskaya, Madlen Anzhjuskaya, Madlenka, Madlenka Rana, Magdalena Anzhuiskaya, Magdalena Anzhujskaya, Magdalene Angevine, Magdalenka Skora, Magdalentraube Angevine, Magdalina Anzhuiskaya, Maqdalena Anjuyyskaya, Margitszölö, Petrovskii, Petrovskij, Petrovskiy, Petrovsky, Republician, Weißer Äugstler
Malvasia Istriana	B	7269	Unknown	Alpine Valleys, Eden Valley, Granite Belt, Heathcote, North East Victoria, Tamar Valley	Bela Malvazija, Casasola, Istarska Malvazija, Malvasia, Malvasia Bianca, Malvasia Comune, Malvasia d'Istria, Malvasia d'Istria Bianca, Malvasia del Carso, Malvasia del Lazio, Malvasia di Ronchi, Malvasia Friulana, Malvasia Istarka, Malvasia lstriana, Malvasia Nostrale, Malvasia Puntinata, Malvasia Weiß, Malvasier von Istrien, Weißer, Malvasika Istarksa Bijela, Malvazija, Malvazija Istarksa, Malvazija Istarksa Bijela, Malvaziya, Malvaziya Istarsca, Malvaziya Istarska, Malvoisie d'Istrie, Malvoisie d'Istrie Blanche, Malvoisie de Istrie, Malvoisie de l'Istrie, Malvoisie from Istria White, Malvosie de l'Istrie, Očenaš, Polijsakica Drnovk, Vrbić, Vrbić Bieli, Vrbić Bijeli, Weißer Malvasia, Weißer Malvasier von Istrien, White Malvoisie from Istria
Marsanne	B	7434	Unknown	Adelaide Hills, Alpine Valleys, Barossa Valley, Beechworth, Bendigo, Canberra, Central Ranges, Eden Valley, Frankland River, Geelong, Gippsland, Goulburn Valley, Grampians, Granite Belt, Heathcote, McLaren Vale, Macedon Ranges, Margaret River, Mount Barker, Mount Benson, Mudgee, Nagambie Lakes, Orange, Pemberton, Pyrenees, Riverina, Riverland, Rutherglen, Shoalhaven Coast, Swan Valley, Tamar Valley, Upper Goulburn, Wrattonbully, Yarra Valley	Avilleran, Avilleron, Champagne Piacentina, Ermitage, Ermitage Blanc, Ermitazh, Grosse Roussette, Hermitage, Johannisberg, Malvasia Bianca di Basilicata, Malvasia Bianca di Lucania, Marsan, Marsanne Belyi, Marsanne Blanche, Marsanne Drôme, Marzanne, Metternich, Rousseau, Roussette de Saint Peray, Roussette Grosse, Roussette Saint-Péray, White Hermitage, Zrmitazh
Melon de Bourgogne	B	As Melon - 7615	Gouais Blanc = Heunisch Weiß x Pinot Blanc	Barossa Valley, Mornington Peninsula	Auxerrois Gros, Biaune, Blanc de Nantes, Bourgogne Blanche, Bourgogne Verde, Bourgogne Verte, Bourguignon Blanc, Clozier, Fehér Nagyburgundi, Feuille Ronde, Gamay Blanc, Gamay Blanc à Feuilles Rondes, Game Kruglolistnyi, Gros Auxerrois, Gros Blanc, Grosse Sainte-Marie, Latran, Lyonnais, Lyonnaise Blanche, Malin, Malin Blanc, Melé, Melon, Melon Bijeli, Meurlon, Mourlon, Muscadet, (Note: Melon de Bourgogne is used in making Muscadet. However, US federal law forbids use of the term Muscadet in that country and the wine is usually sold under the name Melon de Bourgogne in full or as Melon.) Perry, Petit Bourgogne, Petit Muscadet, Petite Biaune, Petite Bourgogne, Pétoin, Pétouin, Picarneau, Plant de Bourgogne, Plant de Loms-le-Saunier, Pourisseux, Roussette Basse, Savagnin Jaune, Später Weißer Burgunder, Weißer Burgunder
Monbadon	B	7916	Folle Blanche x Ugni Blanc (Trebbiano Toscano)	Rutherglen	Aouba, Auba, Blanc de Cadillac, Burger, Cadillac, Frontignan des Charentes
Mondeuse Blanche	B	7919	Unknown	McLaren Vale	Aigre Blanc, Blanc Aigre, Blanch, Blanchette, Couilleri, Dongine, Donjin, Jongin, Jonvin, Molette, Persagne, Savouette
Montils	B	7956	Gouais Blanc - Heunisch Weiß x ?	Hunter Valley	Aucarot, Aucerot, Blanc de Montils, Chalosse
Moscato Giallo	B	8056	x ?	Adelaide Hills, Adelaide Plains, Alpine Valleys, Barossa Valley, Bendigo, Canberra, Central Ranges, Clare Valley, Darling Downs, Geographe, Gippsland, Gold Coast Hinterland, Granite Belt, Hastings River, Heathcote, Hunter Valley, Langhorne Creek, Margaret River, Mornington Peninsula, Murray Darling, Nagambie Lakes, Orange, Riverina, Riverland, Southern Highlands, Swan Hill, Tamar Valley, Upper Goulburn, Yarra Valley	Culupunto, Fior d'Arancio, Goldmuskateller, Moscat, Moscatel, Moscatel Amarilla, Moscatel Amarillo, Moscatello di Vico, Moscato Armeno, Moscato Bianco, Moscato Cipro, Moscato dalla Siria, Moscato di Pasqua, Moscato di Terracina, Moscato Sirio, Moscato Siro, Moscato Tardivo, Muscadeddu, Muscat Vert, Muscat du Pays, Muscat Italien, Muscat Vera, Muskat Zuti, Muscatedda, Muscat de Goloio, Muskat Dzhiallo, Muskát Žutí
Müller-Thurgau (Note: This variety was created by Dr Hermann Müller (1850-1927), a Swiss botanist, plant physiologist, oenologist and grape breeder.)	B	As Mueller Thurgau Weiss - 8141	Riesling x Madeleine Royale	Ballarat, Mount Barker, Mudgee, Southern New South Wales Zone, Tamar Valley	Miler Turgau, Mueller Thurgeau, Mueller Thurgeaux, Mueller Thurgau Bianco, Mueller Thurgau Bijeli, Mueller Thurgaurebe, Muellerka, Muellerovo, Müller, Müller-Thurgau Blanc, Müller-Thurgau Rebe, Müller Thurgau Weiß, Müller Thurgau Weißer, Muller Thurgau, Muller Thurgau White, Muller Torgau, Mullerka, Mullerovo, Myuller Turgau, Riesling-Silvaner, Riesling x Silvaner, Riesling-Sylvaner, Riesvaner, Rivaner, Rizlingsilvani, Rizlingsylvany, Rizlingszilvani, Rizlingszilváni, Rizvanac, Rizvanac Bijeli, Rizanec, Rizvanec, Rizvaner, Uva di Lauria
Muscadelle	B	8182	? x Gouais Blanc = Heunisch Weiß	Barossa Valley, Canberra, Clare Valley, Glenrowan, King Valley, Margaret River, McLaren Vale, Mudgee, Riverland, Rutherglen, Swan Valley	Angelicaut, Angelico, Blanc Cadillac, Blanc Douce, Blanche Douce, Bouillenc, Bouillenc Muscat, Buillenc, Cadillac, Catapé, Colle, Colle Musquette, Doucanelle, Douzanelle, Enfin, Guepie, Guilan Doux, Guilan Muscat, Guilan Musqué, Guilhan Muscat, Guillan, Guillan Musqué, Guinlhan Musqué, Marmesie, Marseillais, Melon de Bourgogne, Muscade, Muscadela, ru:Мускадель, Mascadelle Beyaz, Muscadelle de Bordelais, ru:Мускадель Уайт, Muscadet, Muscadet Doux, Muscalea, Muscat Fou, Musquette, Pedro Ximenes Krimsky, Raisimotte, Raisin de Musco, Raisinote, Raisinotte, Rouselou, Sauvignon à Gros Grains, Sauvignon Muscadelle, Sauvignon Vert, Tokay, Topaque, Vesparo, White Angelica
Muscat à Petits Grains Blancs	B	8193	Unknown	Barossa Valley, Glenrowan, Greater Perth, King Valley, Langhorne Creek, McLaren Vale, Riverina, Riverland, Rutherglen, South Burnett, Southern Highlands, Swan Valley, Western Plains	Ag Muskat, Alpianae de Los Romanos, Anatholican Moschaton, Apiana, Bala Dinka, Bárzsing, Bárzsing Bjala Tamjanka, Beala Tameanka, Bela Dinka, Beli Muscát, Beli Muskát, Belii Muscátnii, Beyaz Misket, Biblina, Bílý Muscatel, Bílý Muskatel, Bjala Bornova Misket, Bjala Tamjanka, Blanche Douse, Bornova Misketi, Brown Frontignac, Brown Muscat, Busuioacă, Busuioacă Albă, Busuioacă de Bohotin, Busuioacă de Moldava, Busuioacă de Moldova, Busuioacă de Moldavia, Busuiok, [:ru:Бусуйок], Chungi, Csikos Muskotally, Csikos Zoeld Szagos, Cungy, Dinka Bela, Early Silver Frontignan, Fehér Muskotally, Franczier Veros Muscatel, Franczier Voros Miskatel, Frontignac, Frontignan, Gelber Muscateller, Gelber Muskateller, Gelber Weirauch, Generosa, Grauer Muskateller, Grüner Musckateller, Grüner Musk, Grüner Muskateller, Hazai Muskotály, Honi Muskotaály, Irmes, Izmir Misket, Istarski Muškát, Joenică, Jiszgau, Katzendreckler, Kedves Muskotály, Khungi, Kilianstraube, Kungi, Kunqi, Kustidini, Ladanniy, [:ru:Ладанный], Ladanny, Ladannyi, Ladany, Lidannyi, Lidannyj, Malvasia Bianca, Malvasia di Viggiano, Momjanski Muškat, Moscadello, Moscadello Giallo, Moscat Bianco, Moscata Bianca, Moscatel Amizclero, Moscatel Blanco, Moscatel Blanco de Grano Menudo, Moscatel Branco, Moscatel Castellano, Moscatel Commun, Moscatel Comun, Moscatel de Bago Miudo, Moscatel de Bago Miudo Blanco, Moscatel de Bago Miudo Branco, Moscatel de Canelli, Moscatel de Douro, Moscatel de Frontinan, Moscatel de Grano, Moscatel de Grano Menudo, Moscatel de Grano Menudo Blanco, Moscatel de Grano Pequeno, Moscatel de Jésus, Moscatel de la Tierra, Moscatel de Toro, Moscatel del Pais, Moscatel do Douro, Moscatel Dorado, Moscatel Encarnado, Moscatel Fino, Moscatel Galego Branco, Moscatel Galego Menudo, Moscatel Menudo, Moscatel Menudo Bianco, Moscatel Menudo Blanco, Moscatel Menudo Branco, Moscatel Morisco, Moscatel Morisco Fino de Málaga, Moscatel Nunes, Moscatel Romano, Moscatelillo, Moscatella Bianca, Moscatella Generosa, Moscatella Isidori, Moscatello, Moscatello Antico, Moscatello Bianco, Moscatello Bianco di Basilicata, Moscatello di Montalcino, Moscatello di Saracena, Moscatello di Taggia, Moscatellone, Moscato, Moscato Bianco, Moscato Bianco Comune, Moscato Bianco dell'Elba, Moscato Bianco Piemontese, Moscato Blanco, Moscato Canelli, Moscato d'Arqua, Moscato d'Asti, Moscato dei Colli, Moscato dei Colli Euganei, Moscato di Chambave, Moscato d'Asti, Moscato dei Colli Euganei, Moscato di Candia, Moscato di Canelli, Moscato di Chambave, Moscato di Frontinan, Moscato di Momiano, Moscato di Montalcino, Moscato di Noto, Moscato di Orso Senori, Moscato di S. Maria, Moscato di Sardegna, Moscato di Siracusa, Moscato di Tempio, Moscato di Temptio Pausania, Moscato di Trani, Moscato Forlivese, Moscato Reale, Moscato Samos, Moscato Spinas, Moscato Tempio, Moscatofilo, Moschato, Moschato Aspro, Moschato Kerkyras, Moschato Lefko, Moschato Mazas, Moschato of Samos, Moschato of Spinas, Moschato Proimo, Moschato Psilo, Moschato Riou, Moschato Samou, Moschato Spinas, Moschato Trani, Moschonidi, Moschostaphylo Aspro, Moschoudi, Moschoudi Proimo, Moscodellone, Moscovitza, Moshato Spinas, Moskat Bianco, Moskat i Bardhe, Muscadel, Muscadel Morisco, Muscadella, Muscat, Muscat à Petit Graine, Muscat à Petites Grains, Muscat aux Petit Grains, Muscat Beli, Muscat Belii, [:ru:Мускат белый], Muscat Belyi, Muscat Blanc, Muscat Blanc à Petits Grains, Muscat Blanc Commun, Muscat Blanc de Frontignan, Muscat Blanc du Valais, Muscat Canelli, Muscat Commun, Muscat Cvadrat, Muscat d'Alsace, Muscat d'Alsace Blanc, Muscat d'Astrakhan, Muscat de Alsace, Muscat de Chambave, Muscat de Die, Muscat de Frontignan, Muscat de Colmar, Muscat de Die, Muscat de Los Franceses, Muscat de Lunce, Muscat de Lunel, Muscat de Narbonne, Muscat de Rivesaltes, Muscat de Samos, Muscat de Spina, Muscat di Frontignan, Muscat du Puy de Dôme, Muscat du Valais, Muscat Frontignac, Muscat Frontignan, [:ru:Мускат фронтиньянский], Muscat Lunel, [:ru: Мускат Люнель], Muscat Patras, Muscat Psilo, Muscat Quadrat, [:ru:Мускат сбытней], Muscat Sámos, Muscat Spitak, Muscata Bianca, Muscatel Branco, Muscatel do Douro, Muscateller, Muscateller Weiß, Muscatellus, Muscato Bianco, Muscattler, Musk Grüner, Musk Weißer, Muskacela, Muskadel White, Muskat, Muškát Beli, Muškát Belii, Muškát Belij, Muškát Belyi, Muškát Belyj, Muškát Bijeli, Muškát Istarski, Muškát Frontinjan, Muškát Frontinyanskii, Muškát Iyunel, Muškát Ljunel, Muškát Lyunel, Muškát Momjanski, Muškát Morujanski, Muškát Peti Gran, Muškát Rannii, Muškát Rumeni, Muskat Traube Weiße, Muškát Žltý, Muškát Žlutý, Muškát Žuti, Muskatály, Muskatel, Muskateller, Muskateller Gelb, Muskateller Gelber, Muskateller Grün, Muskateller Grüner, Muskateller Weißer, Muskateller Weißgelber, Muskatentraube Weißer, Moskota, Muskotály, Muskuti, Mysket, Myskett, Piros Muskotály, Ranfler, Roter Muskateller, Muskuti, Oeillade Musqué, Pfundtraube, Rozdas Muskotály, Rumeni Muscikat, Rumeni Muškat, Saint Jacques Blanc, Sárga Muskotály, Sárga Muskotály, Sari Muscateller, Schmeckende, Schmeckende Weyrer, Schmeeckender, Schmekender, Schwarzer Muskateller, Seidentraube, Small Berry Muscat, [:ru:Мускат мелкоягодный], Szagos Weirer, Tămâiată, Tămâioasă, [:ru:Тамайоза], Tămâioasă Albă, Tămâioasă Albă di Dragașani, Tămâioasă Românească, Tămâioasă de Drăgășani, Tămâioasă de Moldava, Tămâioasă di Moldavia, Tămâioasă Românească, Tămâioză, Tămâyază, Tămiankă, [:ru: Тамянка], Tămiiată, Tămiioasă, Tămiioasă Albă de Bohotin, Tămiioasă Albă Rominească, Tămiioasă de Bohotin, Tămiioasă de Drăgășani, Tămiioasă de Moldova, Tămiioasă de Muntenia, Tămiioasă Românească, Tamiiosa Albă, Tămiiosă de Dragașani, Tămiiosă de Moldava, Tămjanikă Bela, Tămjanikă Bijela, Tămjankă, Tămnjanikă Bela, Tămyankă, Tămyanikă, Temjanikă, Uva Apiana, Uva de Cheiro, Uva Moscatello, Wanzenweinbeer, Weier, Weier Muskatály, Weihrauch, Weirauch Gelb, Weirauch Weiß, Weirauchtraube, Weirer, Weiße Muskattraube, Weißer Grüner, Weißer Muskateller, Weißgelber, Weißgelber Muskateller, Weyrauch Weißer, Weyrer, White Fontignan, White Frontignac, White Frontignan, White Muscadel, Zoruna, Žutí Mušcát, Žutí Muškát, Žutimuškát, Žutý Muškát
Muscat d'Alexandrie (See Muscat of Alexandria)					
Muscat Fleur d'Oranger (Orange Muscat)	B	8221	Muscat Blanc à Petits Grains x Chasselas	Beechworth, Goulburn Valley, Grampians, Hunter Valley, King Valley, Mount Barker, Mudgee, North East Victoria, Rutherglen, Southern New South Wales Zone, Western Plains	Baharat Early, Bela Dinka, Beli Muskat, Beyaz Misket, Bornova Misket, Brown Muscat, Chasselas à Fleur d'Orange, Chasselas Croquant, Chasselas Fleur d'Orange, Chasselas Fleur d'Oranger, Chasselas Mousqué Blanc Crouqant, Chasselas Musqué de Nantes, Chasselas Mousquc Bianc Crouqant, Cranford Muscat, Eugenien Frontignan, Krokan Muskotally, Lacrimae Christi, Macaristan Muskati, Mađarski Muskat, Malvoisier, Mirisavka, Moscatel de Grèce, Moscatel Gordo Peludo, Moscatel Primavis, Moscato Fior d'Arancio, Moscato Fior de Naranza, Moscato Fior di Arancio, Moscato Fiori d'Arancio, Moscato Greco, Muscat Croccan, Muscat Berkain, Muscat Berkheim, Muscat Croquant, Muscat d'Espagne, Muscat de Berkain, Muscat de Hongrie, Muscat de Jésus, Muscat de Rivesaltes, Muscat Fiori d'Arancio, Muscat Fler d'Orange, Muscat Fleur d'Orange, Muscat Jaune, Muscat Jésus, Muscat Krokan, Muscat Muscadine, Muscat of Hungary, Muscat Primavi, Muscat Primavis, Muscat Qrouqant, Muscat Queen Victoria, Muscat Regnier, Muscat Vainly, Muscat Vengerski, Muscat Vengerskii, Muscato Fiori d'Arinico, Muskat de Zhezyu, Muskat Fler d'Oranzh, Muskat Krokan, Muskat Primavi, Muskat Vengerski, Muskat Vengerskii, Muskat Vengerekij, Nantskaya, Orange Muscat, Orange Muskat, Org Tokos, Pascal Muscat, Pascal Musqué, Primavis, Primavis Muskat, Raisin Blanc de Saint Alban, Raisin Vanilla, Raisin Vanille, Razdrob, Rozdrob, Sent Alban, Shasla Muskat Nayanatskaya, Tokai des Jardins, Tokai Musqué, Tokay des Jardins, Tokay Musqué, Vanilia Muskotally, Vanilijevka, White Vanilla GrapeVanilijefka, Vanilin, Vanilya, Vanille Raisin, Vanilletraube, Vanilletraube Weiße, Weiße Vanillentraube, Weiße Vanilletraube
Muscat Gordo Blanco (See Muscat of Alexandria)					
Muscat of Alexandria	B	8241	Axina de Tres Bias = Heptakilo x	Adelaide Hills, Clare Valley, Murray Darling, North East Victoria, Riverland, Rutherglen, Swan Valley	About 200 synonyms including Acherfield's Early Muskat, Albillo di Torro, Aleksandrijski Muskat, Alexandriai Muskotály, Angliko, Apostoliatiko, Argelino, Augibi Blanc, Cibeben Muskateller, Cibib, Cibib Muskatan Bijeli, Daroczy Musko, Gerosolimitana Bianca, Gordo, Gordo Zibibo, Gorosolimitana Bianca, Hannepoot, Iskendiriye Misketi, Isidori, Jubi Blanc, Lexia, Malaga, Meski, Moscatel Bianco, Moscatel Blanco, Moscatel Flamenco, Moscatel Gordo, Moscatel Gordo Blanco, Moscatel Gordo Morado, Moscatel Graúdo, Moscatel Romano, Moscatel de Alejandría, Moscatel de Chipiona, Moscatel de Grano Gordo, Moscatel de Jesus, Moscatel de Malaga, Moscatel de Málaga, Moscatel d'Alessandria, Moscatellone, Moscato Francese, Moscato Gordo, Moscato di Pantelleria, Moschato Alexandrias, Moschato Limnou, Muscat à Gros Grains, Muscat Bowood, Muscat Grec, Muscat Romain, Muscat d’Alexandrie Blanc, Muscat d’Espagne, Muscat de Berkain, Muscat de Fandouk, Muscat de Jerusalem, Muscat de Raf-Raf, Muscat de Rome, Moscatel de Setúbal, Muscat El Adda, Muscat Gordo Blanco, Muscat-Damascener, Paradisia, Roode Hannepoot, Salamanca, Seralamanna, Tamîioasa de Alexandria, Uva di Pantelleria, Weißer Spanier, Weißer Zibeben-Muscateller, White Hannepoot, White Muscat of Alexandria, Zibeben Muskateller, Zibibbo, Zibibbo Blanco, Zibibbo de Pantellaria, Zibibo
Nosiola	B	8606	Unknown	Heathcote	Durel, Durella, Durello, Durola Veronese, Groppello Bianco, Nosella, Nosellara, Nosilla, Nosilla, Nosiola Gentile, Nusiola, Nusiola Gentile, Spargelen, Spargeren, Spatfelen
Ondenc	B	8770	? x Savagnin Blanc = Traminer	Barossa Valley	Austenq, Baratszölö, Béquin, Bergeracois, Blanc de Gaillac, Blanc Select, Blanc Selection Carriere, Blanquette, Blanquette Sucrée, Chaloche, Chalosse, Cu de Brecherou, Doudant Blanc, Doudent, Dourec, Dourech, Francia Szuerke, Fronsadais, Gaillac, Goundoulenc, Gris de Salces, Gris de Salses, Guindolenc, Guidoulenc, Hamu Szölö, Hamuszölö, Irvine's White, Mauzac, Nagyvati, Oeil de Tour, Ondain, Ondainc, Ondenc Blanc, Ondent, Ondin, Oundenc, Oundenq, Oustenc, Oustenq, Oustenque, Piquepout de Moiss, Piquepout de Moissac, Plant de Gaillac, Prendiou, Prentiou, Primai, Primaic, Primard, Printiou, Riverain, Sable Blanc, Sals, Sals Cenusiu, Salses Gris, Semis Blanc, Sencit Blanc, Sensit Blanc, Sercial, Shome Seryi, Sose Serii, Trousseau Gris
Palomino Fino	B	8888	Unknown	Barossa Valley, Beechworth, Granite Belt, Riverina, Riverland, Rutherglen	Albán, Albar, Abilla, Abilla de Lucena, Albillo de Lucena, Antillana, Assario, Assario do Altejo, Bayoud, Bayoud Merseguera, Blanc d'Algerie, Blanc d'Anjou, Blanc de Bordeaux, Blanc Leroy, Blanc Castellana, Blanca Extra, Blanca Peluda, Chasselard Grillas, Chasselardign Grillas, Chasselas de Jésus, Golden Chasselas, Cherin Blanc, Chering Blanc, Conil, Diagalves, Doradillo, Dorado, El Bayoudh, Faranah, Fransdruif, Gencibel, Genciber, Gencibera, Gencibiera, Golden Chasselas, Grenade, Grillo, Guignard de Saintours 1, Horgazuela, Jerez, Jerez de la Frontera, Jerez Dorado, Jerez Fina, Jerez Fino, Jerezana, Jerezana Fina, Katalon Letnii, Katalon Zimnij, L'Istan d'Andalusie Blanc, Labrusco, Lacet, Lairenes Vertes, Laket, Listán Bianco di Andalusia, Lista Blanco, Listán, Listán Blanc, Listán Blanco, Listán Blanco de Canarias, Listán Commún, Listán Común, Listán de Drinada, Listán de Drinado, Listán de Jerez, Listán Gacho, Listán Ladrenado, Listán Laeren, Listán Letnii, Listán Tardif, Listán White French, Listão, Listão de Madeira, Listráo, Madera, Malvasia Rei, Malvazia, Malvazia Rei, Manzanilla, Manzanilla de Sanlucar, Merseguera, Motril, Mourisco, Neiran d'Alle, Oio de Liebre, Ojo de Liebre, Olho de Lebre, Orcaculo, Orgazuela, Palomilla, Palomillo, Palomina, Palomina Blanca, Palomina Blanche, Palomino, Palomino 84, Palomino Basto, Palomino de Chipiona, Palomino de Jerez, Palomino del Pinchito, Palomino Fino des Xeres, Palomino Listán, Palomino Macho, Palomino Pelusón, Palominos, Palominos de Xeres, Palote, Paulo, Perola do Alentejo, Perrum, Petrese, Petrese Bianco, Petrisa, Petrise, Petrisi, Petrisi Vranou, Petriso, Petrosa, Petrusa Janca, Petrusi, Point Noir, Polomino, Polominos, Punchi Neri, Qis Katalonu, Sardoá Portalegre, Seminario, Temprana, Temprana Blanca, Tempranas Blancas, Tempranas Blanches, Tempranilla, Tempranilla Blanca Listán, Tempranillo de Granada, Tempranillo de Grenada, Temprano, Tempranos, Useiran d'Alle, Verdalou, White French, White French Fransdruif, Winter Catalon, Xeres, Xerez, Zarcillarda
Parellada	B	8938	Hebén x ?	Mudgee	Martorella, Moltonach, Montañesa, Montona, Montònec, Montònech, Montònega, Montòneo, Montònero, Parellada Blanc, Perellada, Verda Grossa
Pedro Ximénez (Note: Not to be confused with Pedro Giménez, an Argentinian white variety. Unfortunately, Pedro Giménez is one of the synonyms for this variety.)	B	9080	Hebén x ?	Barossa Valley, Clare Valley, Margaret River, Mount Lofty Ranges, Perth Hills, Riverina, Rutherglen, Swan Valley	Alamais, Alamis, Alamis de Totana, Chirones, Chironet, Corinto Bianco, Don Bueno, Jiménez, Pasa Rosada de Málaga, Pedro, Pedro Giménez, Pedro Giménez Rio Colorado, Pedro Himénez, Pedro Jiménez, Pedro Khimenes, Pedro Ximén, Pedro Ximénes, Pedro Ximénes de Jerez, Pedro Ximenez Bijeli, Pedro Ximénez de Montilla, Pedro Ximinez, Pedroximénes, Peresimenez, Pero Ximén, Pero Ximénez, Perrum, Petri Simonis, Pierre Ximenes, PX, Raisin Pero, Uva Pedro Ximénez, Uva Pero Ximén, Uva Pero Ximénes, Uva Pero Ximénez, Verdello, Ximén, Ximenecia, Ximénes, Ximénez, Zalema Colchicina
Petit Manseng	B	As Manseng Petit Blanc - 7339	Savagnin Blanc = Traminer x ?	Adelaide Hills, Alpine Valleys, Beechworth, Gippsland, Granite Belt, Henty, King Valley, Margaret River, Mornington Peninsula, Mudgee, New England, Orange, Gold Coast Hinterland, Riverland, Rutherglen	Escriberou, Ichiriota Zuria Tipia, Iskiriota Zuri Tipia, Izkiriot Ttipi, Mansein, Mansein Blanc, Manseing, Mansenc Blanc, Mansenc Grisroux, Manseng Blanc, Manseng Petit Blanc, Mansengou, Mansic, Mansin, Mausec, Mausec Blanc, Miot, Petit Mansenc, Petit Manseng Blanc
Petit Meslier	B	As Meslier Petit - 7675	Gouais Blanc = Heunisch Weiß x Savagnin Blanc = Traminer	Eden Valley, Tamar Valley	Arbois, Arboisier, Arbonne, Barnay, Bernais, Bernet, Co de France, Crêne, Feuille d'Ozerolle, Hennequin, Lepine, Maille, Maye, Mayer, Melié, Melié Blanc, Melier, Meslier Bianco, Meslier de Champagne, Meslier Doré, Meslier Jaune, Meslier Petit, Meslier Petit à Queue Rouge, Meslier Vert, Mornain Blanc, Orbois, Parisien, Petit Meslier à Queue Rouge, Petit Meslier Doré, Queue Rouge, Saint Lye
Picolit	B	9236	Unknown	Adelaide Plains, Bendigo, Gippsland, Heathcote, King Valley, Mudgee	Balafan, Balafant, Balatoni Fekete, Balatoni Kék, Blaustängler, Blaustiel Blauer, Blaustingl Weiß, Blaustingl Weißer, Fekete Balatoni, Kéh Nyelii, Kék Balatoni, Kék Kéknyelü, Kék Nyelii, Kék Nyeliü, Kék Nyelli, Kéknyelü, Kéknyelû, Kéknyelü Kék, Kel'ner, Kiknyelü, Peccoletto Bianco, Picciolito del Friuli, Piccoleto, Piccoleto Bianco, Piccoletto, Piccolit, Piccolito, Piccolito Bianco, Piccolito del Friuli, Piccolitt, Piccolitto, Picolit Bianco, Picolit Weißer, Piculit, Piecoletto, Pikolit, Pikolit Weißer, Piros Kéknyelü, Ranful Weiß, Ranful Weißer, Uva del Friuli, Weißer Blaustingel, Weißer Blaustingl, Weißer Picolit, Weißer Pikolit, Weißer Ranful
Picpoul (See Piquepoul Blanc)					
Pignoletto	B	9254	According to DNA analysis, identical with Grechetto di Todi and Rébola or Ribolla Riminese	Geographe, Perth Hills	Aglionzina, Alionzina, Cor d'Usel, Cuor d'Usel, Grechetto, Grechetto di Todi, Grechetto Gentile, Grechetto Pignoletto, Greco Bianco di Rogliano, Greco Gentile, Occhietto, Pallagrella Bianca, Pallagrello Bianco, Pallagrello di Avellino, Pallagrello di Caserta, Pallagrella Bianca, Pallagrello Bianco, Pallagrello di Avellino, Pallagrello di Caserta, Pallarella, Piedimonte Bianco, Pignoletta Bianca, Pignoletto Bolognese, Pignolino, Pignolo, Pignolo di Forli, Pulcinculo, Rébola, Ribolla Riminese, Strozzavolpe, Uva Grilli, Uve Pignole
Pinot Blanc	B	9272	A colour mutation of Pinot Noir (Note: Although WPG describes this variety as "a colour mutation of Pinot gris (or vice versa) from which Pinot Noir has mutated", Robinson et al. say: “Until recently, Pinot Noir, Pinot Gris, Pinot Blanc, Pinot Meunier, Pinot Noir Précoce and Pinot Teinturier, to cite the most common mutations, were considered to be distinct varieties belonging to a so-called ‘Pinot family’. However, black, grey and white berries can sometimes be observed on the same Pinot vine, or even individual striped berries, and DNA profiling has now revealed that all the Pinot types mentioned above have the same genetic fingerprint when analysed at the standard set of eight DNA markers. As a consequence, it is misleading to talk about a ‘Pinot family’ because all these forms are mutations that appeared within a single initial variety, Pinot.”)	Adelaide Hills, Alpine Valleys, Barossa Valley, Beechworth, Canberra, Gippsland, Great Lakes, Heathcote, Langhorne Creek, Macedon Ranges, Margaret River, Pemberton, Riverina, Rutherglen, Southern Fleurieu, Southern Highlands, Tasmania Southern, Tamar Valley, Yarra Valley	Ag Pino, Arbst Weiß, Arnaison Blanc, Arnoison, Auvernas, Auvernat, Auvernat Blanc, Auxerrois, Beli Pinot, Beyaz Burgunder, Biela Klevanjka, Bijeli Pino, Blanc de Champagne, Bon Blanc, Borgogna Bianca, Borgogna Bianco, Borgognino, Borgoña Blanco, Borgonja Bela Mala, Borgonja Malo Zrno, Burgunda, Burgundac, Burgundac Beli, Burgundac Bijeli, Burgunder Blanc, Burgunder Weiß, Burgunder Weißer, Burgundi Fehér, Burgundi Kisfehér, Burgundische Ximenstraube, Burgundske Bieli, Burgundske Bile, Chardonnet Pinot Blanc, [:ru:Шенэн Блан], Clävner, Clevner, Epinette, Epinette Blanche, Fehér Burgundi, Fehér Kisburgundi, Fehér Klevner, Fehérburgundi. Fin Plant Doré, Gentil Blanc, Grossburgunder, Kisburgundi Fehér, Klävner, Klävner Weißer, Kleinedel, Kleinedel Weißer, Kleiner Weiß, Klevanjka Bijela, Klevner, Klevner Weiß, Moretoe Varieté Blanche, Morillon Blanc, Noirien Blanc, Pineau, Pineau Blanc, Pineau Blanc Vrai, Pino Belii, Pino Belyi, Pino Blan, [:ru:Пино Блан], [:ru:Пино белый], [:ru:Пино де ла Луара], Pino na Vino, Pinot Bianco, Pinot Bianco Verde, Pinot Bijeli, Pinot Blanc Chardonnet, Pinot Blanc d'Alsace, Pinot Blanc Vrai, Pinot Branco, Pinot Doux, Pinot Verde, Plant de la Dole, Plant Doré, Rehfall, Roci Bile, Rouci Bile, Ruländer Weiß, Rulandske Biele, Rulandské Bílé, Rulandsky Bile, Spätburger Doré, Später Weißer Burgunder, [:ru:Стин], Vejser Burgunder, Vert Plant, Weiß Elder, Weißarbst, Weißburgunder, [:ru:Вейсбургундер], Weißcläven, Weißclevener, Weißer Arbst, Weißer Klävner, Weißer Klevner, Weißgelber Klevner, Weißklävler, Weißklevner, Ximenesia Burgundica
Pinot Gris or Pinot Grigio)	B	A clonal variation of Pinot (See Pedigree reference under Pinot Blanc)	Adelaide Hills, Derwent Valley, Great Lakes, Huon/Channel, Hunter Valley, Kangaroo Island, King Valley, Mornington Peninsula, Murray Darling, Padthaway, Pemberton, Riverina, Riverland, Southern Fleurieu, Swan District, Swan Hill, Wrattonbully, Yarra Valley	Affume, Anche Cendrée, Arnaison Gris, Arnoison Gris, Aserat, Auvergnas Gris, Auvergne Gris, Auvernas Gris, Auvernat Gris, Auvernet, Auxerrat, Auxerrois Gris, Auxoi, Auxois, Auzerois Gris, Baratszinszölö, Bayonner, Beurot, Bilboner, Blauer Riesling, Blauer Traminer, Borgogna Grigio, Boz Pino, Brombesta, Brot, Bureau, Burgundac Sivi, Burgunder, Burgunder Grauer, Burgunder Roter, Burgundi Szürke, Burgundské Šedé, Burgundské Sivé, Burot, Casper, Champagner, Clävner Roth, Clevner, Cordelier Gris, Cordonnier Gris, Crvena Klevanjka, Druher, Drusen, Drusent, Druser, Edelclävner, Edelklevner, Enfume, Enfume Griset, Faultraube, Fauvet, Friset, Fromenteau, Fromenteau Gris, Fromentot, Grau Clevner, Grau Malvasir, Grauburgunder, Grauclevner, Graue Burgunder, Graue Savoyertraube, Grauer Burgunder, Grauer Clävner, Grauer Clevner, Grauer Klevner, Grauer Mönch, Grauer Riesling, Grauer Ruländer, Grauer Tokayer, Graukläber, Graulävner, Grauklevner, Gris Commún, Gris Cordelier, Gris de Dornot, Griset, Hamsas Svollo, Hamaszölö, Hamvas Szölö, Kapuziner Kutten, Kapuzinerkutten, Klebroth, Kleiner Traminer, Kleingrau, Klevanjka, Klevanjka Crvena, Klevner Rot, Levrant, Levraut, Little Traminer, Malvasier Grau, Malvoisie, Malvoisien, Mauseri, Mausfarbe, Mönch Grau, Molvoisie Valais, Moréote Gris, Moréte Gris Rouge, Murys, Murysak, Muscade, Muscadet, Musler, Noirin Gris, Noirien Gris, Ouche Cendrée, Overnya Gri, Pineau Cendré, Pineau Cendrée, Pineau Gris, Pineau Rose, Pino Cernyj, Pino Grée, Pino Grey, Pino Gri, Pino Qri, Pino Servi, Pino Seryi, Pinor Gri, Pinot, Pinot Beurot, Pinot Buerot, Pinot Burot, Pinot Cendré, Pinot Franc Gris, Pinot Griccio, Pinot Griggio, Pinot Grigio, Pinot Rajik, Seryi, Pinot Sivi, Piros Kisburgundi, Pirosburgundi, Pyzhik, Rajik, Rauchler, Rauländer, Raulander, Rebfahl, Rehfahl, Rehfal, Reilander, Rhein Traube, Rheingau, Rheingrau, Rheingrauer, Rheintraube, Riesling Grau, Rijick, Rijik, Rohlander, Rolander, Rollander, Rolönder, Ronci Sedive, Roter Burgunder, Roter Clevner, Roter Clewner, Roter Klävner, Roter Klevner, Rothe Savoyertaube, Rothe Savoyertraube, Rothe Clävner, Rother Clevner, Rother Drusen, Rother Klävener, Rother Klävner, Rother Klevner, Rother Rulander, Rotherfränkisch, Rouci Sedive, Ruhländer, Ruhlandi, Ruland, Rulanda, Rulandac Sivi, Rulandec, Rulander, Rulander Grauer, Rulander Gray, Rulander Grigio, Rulandské, Rulandské Šedé, Rulandské Sivé, Ruländer, Ruländer Sivi, Rulendac, Rulendac Sivi, Rulender, Ryjik, Ryzhik, Ryzik, Sarfehér Szölö, Sarfejérszölö, Schieler, Sivi Pinot, Skuerzbarát, Speyerer, Speirer, Speyeren, Speyerer, Spinavy Hrozen, Spinovy Hrozen, Stahler, Strahler, Syurke Barat, Szürké Burgundi, Szürké Kisburgundi, Szürké Klevner, Szürké Rulandi, Szürkébarat, Szurkébarat, Tockay Gris, Tockayer, Tokai, Tokai Gris, Tokay, Tokay d'Alsace, Tokay de Alsace, Tokay di Alsace, Tokay Spierer, Tokayer, Tokayer Grauer, Tromenteau Gris, Valais, Viliboner, Villiboner< Vinum Bonum, Wiliboner, Zeleznak	
Piquepoul Blanc	B	9295	A mutation of Piquepoul Noir	Barossa Valley, Central Ranges, Granite Belt, McLaren Vale	Avello, Avillo, Extra, Fehér Piquepoul, Languedocien, Picabulla, Picapoll, Picapolla, Picapulla, Picboul, Picboul Blanc, Picboul de Pinet, Picpoul de Pinet, Piquepoul de Pinet
Prosecco (Note: WPG points out, "The previously used Prosecco grape variety name is now protected by EU law only as a designation of origin and no longer as a cultivar name. The Prosecco grape variety (Prosecco Tondo) is now called Glera, and the Prosecco Lungo grape is now called Glera Lunga." In 2013, the European Union tried to prevent Australia from using the word on its own products. Wine Australia opposed this, saying that Prosecco was the name of a variety rather than a region from which it originated. By 2019 an agreement between EU and Australia had not yet been reached, and the debate will probably continue for some time. Of course, restrictions on the use of the word Prosecco is only one of many current debates, and as a news report revealed, "Trade Minister Simon Birmingham has released a list with 172 foods and 236 spirits the European Union (EU) wants protected in return for a free trade agreement (FTA) with Australia.")	B	As Glera - 9741	Unknown	Adelaide Hills, Alpine Valleys, Beechworth, Central Ranges, Currency Creek, Eden Valley, Geelong, Heathcote, Hilltops, King Valley, McLaren Vale, Macedon Ranges, Margaret River, Mudgee, Murray Darling, Nagambie Lakes, New England, Perth Hills, Riverland, Rutherglen, Swan Hill, Upper Goulburn, Wrattonbully	Beli Teran, Breskana, Brichka Glera, Briska Glera, Gargana, Ghera, Glere, Gljera, Grappolo Spargolo, Prosecco Balbi, Prosecco Bianco, Prosecco Nostrano, Prosecco Tondo, Prosekar, Proseko, Sciprina, Serpina, Serprina, Serprino, Steverjana, Teran Bijeli, Uva Pissona, Verbic, Verdic, Verdic Beli
Razaki (See Afus Ali)					
Ribolla Gialla	B	10054	? x Gouais Blanc = Weißer Heunisch Weiß	Mornington Peninsula	Arbula Bijela, Avola, Erbula, Gargania, Garganica, Garganija, Garganja, Glera, Gorganica, Goricka Ribola, Grganc, Jarbola, Jerbula, Jerbulovina, Orbola, Pignolo, Prosecker Reinfall, Rabiola, Rabola, Rabolla, Rabolla Dzhalla di Rozatsio, Rabuele, Raibiola, Rebolla, Reboula Jaune, Rebula, Rebula Bela, Rebula Rumena, Rebula Žuta, Refosco Bianco, Ribola Bijela, Ribolla Bianca, Ribola Bianco, Ribola Bijela, Ribola Djiala, Ribolla, Ribolla Bianca, Ribolla di Rosazzo, Ribolla di Dzhalla, Ribolla Gialla di Rosazz, Ribolla Gialla di Rosazzo, Ribollat, Ribuèle, Ribuèle Žale, Ribula Žuta, Ribuole, Rosazzo, Rubolla, Rumena Nebula, Teran Bijeli, Vibacum, Želena Rebula
Riesling	B	As Riesling Weiß - 10077	Savagnin Blanc =Traminer x Gouais Blanc = Weißer Heunisch Weiß	Adelaide Hills, Albany, Barossa Valley, Canberra, Central WA, Clare Valley, Cowra, Coal River Valley, Denmark, Derwent Valley, Eden Valley, Frankland River, Henty, Huon/Channel, Macedon Ranges, Mudgee, Padthaway, Pemberton, Riverina, Riverland, Swan District, Tasmania East Coast, Tasmania North East, Tasmania North West, Tamar Valley, Tasmania Southern, Western Plains	Over 150 synonyms including Beyaz Riesling, Fehér Rajnai, Gräfenberger, Hochheimer, Johannisberg Riesling, Johannisberger, Kleinriesling, Klingelberger, Lipka, Noble Riesling, Petit Rhin, Raisin du Rhin, Rajnai Rizling, Rajnski, Rajinski Riesling, Renski Rizling, Rhine Riesling, Riesling Rhénan, Riesling Renano, Рислінг, [:ru:Рислинг|Ри́слинг], Risling, Rislinoc, Rislinok, Rissling, Ritzling, Rizling, Rizling Rýnsky, Rajnski, Rüsseking, Ryzlink Rýnský, Starovetske, Starovetski, White Riesling, Yellow Riesling
Roussanne	B	10258	Unknown	Adelaide Hills, Barossa Valley, Beechworth, Bendigo, Canberra, Central Ranges, Clare Valley, Currency Creek, Gippsland, Grampians, Granite Belt, Hastings River, Heathcote, Hunter Valley, King Valley, McLaren Vale, Margaret River, Murray Darling, Nagambie Lakes, Northern River, Pemberton, Pyrenees, Queensland Coastal, Queensland Zone, Riverina, Rutherglen, Shoalhaven Coast, Sunbury, Upper Goulburn, Yarra Valley	Barbin, Bergeron, Courtoisie, Fromental, Fromental Jaune, Fromenteal, Fromenteau, Greffon, Greffou, Martin Côt, Martin Rot, Petite Roussette, Picotin Blanc, Plant de Seyssel, Rabellot, Rabelot, Ramoulette, Rebellot, Rebolot, Remoulette, Rosana, Roussane, Roussanne Blanc, Roussette, Rusan, Rusan Belyi, Rusan Blan

== S–Z ==
Grape	Color of Berry Skin	VIVC Variety No	Pedigree	Location - growers and makers	International homonyms and synonyms
Sauvignon Blanc	B	10790	Unknown	Adelaide Hills, Albany, Blackwood Valley, Canberra, Coal River Valley, Cowra, Frankland River, Geographe, Great Lakes, Manjimup, Margaret River, Mornington Peninsula, Mount Benson, Murray Darling, Orange, Pemberton, Riverina, Riverland, Shoalhaven Coast, Southern Fleurieu, Swan Hill, Tasmania East Coast	Beyaz Sauvignon, Blanc Doux, Blanc Fumé, Blanc Fumet, Feigentraube, Bordeaux Bianco, Douce Blanche, Fehér Sauvignon, Feigentraube, Fie, Fie dans le Neuvillois, Fumé, Fumé Blanc, Fumé Surin, Genetin, Gennetin, Gentin à Romorantin, Gros Sauvignon, Libournais, Melkii Sotern, Melkij Sotern, Mušcatni Silvanec, Muškat Silvaner, Muškat Sylvaner, Muškat Sylvaner Weißer, Muškatani Silvanec, Muškatni Silvanac, Muškatni Silvanec, Muškatsilvaner, Painechon, Palledrina, Pellegrina, Petit Sauvignon, Picabon, Piccabon, Pinot Mestny Bely, Pissotta, Puinechou, Punéchon, Punechou, Quinechon, Rouchelin, Sampelgrina, Sarvonien, Sauternes, Sauvignon, Sauvignon à Gros Grains, Sauvignon Bianco, Sauvignon Bijeli, Sauvignon Blanc Musqué, Sauvignon Blanco, Sauvignon Fumé, Sauvignon Gris, Sauvignon Gros, Sauvignon Janne, Sauvignon Jaune, Sauvignon Jeune, Sauvignon Musqué, Sauvignon Petit, Sauvignon Rose, Sauvignon Rouge, Saivignon Vert, Sauvignon White, Savagnin, Savagnin Blanc, Savagnin Musqué, Savagnou, Savignon, Savvy B, Servanien, Servonien, Servoyen, Silvanac Muškatni, Silvanec Muškatni, Sobinjon, Sobinyon, Sotern Marunt, Sotern Small, Souternes, Sovignon Blan, Sovinak, Sovinjon, Silvanec Muškatni, Sovinon, Sovinon Belyi, Sovinyon, Spergola, Spergolina, Surin, Suvinjo, Sylvaner Musqué, Uva Pelegrina, Verdo Belîi, Verdo Belyi, Weißer Sauvignon, White Silvaner, Würzsilvaner, Xirda Sotern, Želena Sauvignon, Žöld Ortlibi
Sauvignon Gris	Gr	A colour mutation of Sauvignon Blanc	Currency Creek, Pemberton, Southern Fleurieu	Fié, Fié Dans le Neuvillois, Fiers, Sauvignon Rosé, Sovignon Gris	
Savagnin Blanc (Not to be confused with Sauvignon Blanc) (Note: WPG refers this variety across to Traminer where it is pointed out that Savagnin Blanc (as the French prefer to call it, or Weißer Traminer according to German usage), Gewütztraminer and Savagnin Rose have almost identical DNA profiles, but are otherwise different from each other in "berry color, aroma, leaf shape and grape size, as well as regarding vigor, yield and susceptibility to disease." Therefore, they are probably bud sports or mutations from the same variety (Gewütztraminer having evolved from Savagnin Rose, which in turn came from Savagnin Blanc, leaving the last as the oldest of the three and having arisen from a much more ancient parentage), the reason why they are often listed together as one variety under Traminer. Robinson et al. explain this further in the chapter entitled "Savagnin": “Today Savagnin shows a considerable level of clonal diversity, seen in berry colour, aroma, leaf shape, cluster size and so on. Several of these forms have often been mistakenly considered to be distinct varieties, eg Gewürztraminer in Alsace and Germany; Heida or Païen in Switzerland; Traminer or Traminer Weisser in Germany; Traminer Aromatico in Trentino-Alto Adige in Italy. Yet DNA profiling has shown that they all have the same genetic fingerprint, with the exception of some minor clonal genetic differences, and that they all correspond to the same variety (Regner et al. 2000a; Imazio et al. 2002). It is consequently misleading to talk about a ‘Savagnin family’ or a ‘Traminer family’ because this suggests family ties such as parent–offspring, uncle–nephew, cousins. “For that reason, the most significant clonal mutations of this variety will be discussed as subsections within this Savagnin entry: the white-yellow-berried Savagnin Blanc, the pink-berried Savagnin Rose and the pink-berried, aromatic Gewürztraminer, in chronological order of appearance in the literature. Even though the historical references to Traminer are earlier than those to Savagnin, the latter is used here as the prime name because it is less misleading in terms of the variety’s origin.” In the next chapter entitled "Savagnin Blanc", the introductory remark says, “Full-bodied, firm, ageworthy wines, sometimes called Traminer.” Regardless of the shared identity between Savagnin Blanc and Traminer, in this chart the two have been given separate entries as a reflection of the usage of both names in Australia.)	B	17636	Unknown	Adelaide Hills, Alpine Valleys, Beechworth, Canberra, Clare Valley, Coonawarra, Denmark, Eden Valley, Geelong, Geographe, Granite Belt, Hastings River, King Valley, Langhorne Creek, McLaren Vale, Margaret River, Mornington Peninsula, Murray Darling, Nagambie Lakes, Orange, Peel, Pemberton, Perth Hills, Riverland, Shoalhaven Coast, Southern Fleurieu, Southern Highlands, Strathbogie Ranges, Tasmania North West, Yarra Valley	Adelfranke, Aida, Albarin Blanco, Altdeutsche, Auvernat Blanc, Banc Court, Beaunié, Blanc Brun, Blanc Court, Bon Blanc, Byrnšt, Christkindlestraube, Clevner, Crevena Ruziva, Crovena Ruzica, Crveni Traminac, Del Reno Gentile, Del Reno Gentile Bianco, Deutsche, Dišeči Traminec, Dreifpennigholz, Dreimänner, Dreimannen, Drumin, Edel Traube, Edeltraube, Edler Weiss, Fehér Tramini, Feuille Ronde, Fleischweiner, Forment, Formentin, Formentin Blanc, Fourmenteau, Fränkisch, Fränkisch Weiß, Fräntsch, Franken, Frankisch, Frennschen, Frenschen Weiß, Frentsch, Fromentais, Fromente, Fromente Blanc, Fromenteau, Fromentin, Furiant, Gelbedler, Gelber Traminer, [:ru:Гелбер Траминер], Gentil Blanc, Gentile Blanc, Gringet, Grünedl, Haida, Heida, [:ru:Хейда], Heidenwein, Kleinblättrige Ximenestraube, Kleinbraun, Kleiner Traminer, Klevner, Malvoisie, Marzimmer, Meunier Blanc, Milleran, Millerantraube, Naturé, Naturé Blanc, Naturel, Noble Vert, Nürnberger, [:ru:Нейче], Païen, [:ru:Пен], Plant Païen, Poligny, Princ Bíly, Prync, Printsch Grau, Rauschling, Rotfrensch, Ryvola Bila, Salvagnin, Sauvagneux, Sauvagnien, Sauvagnin, Sauvagnun, Sauvanon, Sauvoignin, Savagnin, [:ru:Саваньен], [:ru:Саваньен блан], Savagnin Jaune, Savagnin Vert, Savoignin, Schleitheimer, Servoignier, Servoyen Blanc, Svenie, Tokayer, Tramin, Tramin Biely, Tramín Bíly, Traminac, Traminac Beli, Traminac Bijeli, Traminec, Traminer, [:ru:Траминер], Traminer Alb Auriu, Traminer Bianco, Traminer Blanch, Traminer d'Oré, Traminer Doré, Traminer Gelb, Traminer Weiß, Viclair, Vigne Blanche, Vigne Marechal, Weiß Blaue, Weiß Fränkisch, Weiß Frenschen, Weißedler, Weißer Traminer, Weißfrennschen, Weißklövner, Ximenesia Microphylla
Scheurebe	B	10818	Riesling x Bukettrebe	Margaret River	Alzey S. 88, Dr Wagnerrebe, S. 88, Sämling 88, Scheu 88, Scheu Riesling
Sémillon	B	11480	Unknown	Adelaide Hills, Blackwood Valley, Cowra, Denmark, Frankland River, Geographe, Gold Coast Hinterland, Great Lakes, Hastings River, Hilltops, Hunter Valley, Kangaroo Island, Margaret River, Mudgee, Murray Darling, Orange, Peel, Pemberton, Perricoota, Perth Hills, Riverina, Riverland, Shoalhaven Coast, South Burnett, Swan Hill, Swan Valley, Tamar Valley	Barnawartha Pinot, Blanc Doux, Blanc Sémillon, Boal, Boal Branco, Boal no Douro, Cheviler, Chevrier, Chevrier Blanc, Colombar, Colombar Blanc, Colombarride, Colombier, Daune Verte, Dausne, Greengrape, Gröndruif, Gros Sémillon, Hunter River Riesling, Maisois, Málaga, Málaga Bianco, Mances Blanc, Mansois Blanc, Marcillac, Merwah, Monsois Blanc, Oron Sémillon, Petrichtraube Weiße, Saint Émilion, Saint Sémillon, Sauternes, Semijon, Semilão, Semilho, Semilion, Semillon, Semillon Bianco, Semillon Bijeli, Sémillon Blanc, Sémillon Crucillant, Semillon Fehér, Sémillon Grande, Sémillon Muscat, Sémillon Picolo, Sémillon Roux, Sémillon White, Semilon, Semilyon, Seminon, Sercial, Sotern, St. Émilion, Teisor, Wyndruif
Shalistin	B	22609	A mutation or subsequent selection of Malian	Langhorne Creek	
Sylvaner	B	As Silvaner Grün - 11805	Savagnin Blanc = Traminer x Österreichisch Weiß	Barossa Valley, Granite Belt, Mudgee, Riverland, Southern New South Wales Zone, Tasmania Southern, Yarra Valley	Arvine, Arvine Grande, Augustiner Weiss, Augustraube Weisse, Balint, Bálint, Beregi Szilvani, Bötzinger, Bötzinger Cilifantli, Cilifantli, Cinifal Zeleny, Clozier, Cynifadl Zeleny, Cynifal, Cynifal Zeleny, Esterreicher, Feuille Ronde, Fliegentrau, Fliegentraube, Franconian, Franconian Grape, Franken, Franken Riesling, Frankenriesling, Frankentrau, Frankentraube, Frankonian, Frankonian Grape, Füszeres Szilvani, Gamay Blanc, Gelber Silvaner, Gelber Sylvaner, Gentil Vert, Grande Arvine, Gros Plant du Rhin, Gros Rhin, Gros Rhin, Gros Riesling, Gros-Rhin, Gruber, Grüner Silvaner, Grüne Honigtraube, Grünedel, Grüner, Grüner Silvaner, Grüner Sylvaner, Grüner Zierfahndler, Grüner Zirfahndler, Gruener Zierfahnler, Gruener Zierfandl, Grüner Zierfandler, Grüner Zirfahndler, Grüner Zirfantler, Grünfränkisch, Grünlich, Häusler Schwarz, Johannesberger, Johannisberg, Juhannish, Krupnyi Risling, L'auxerrois, Mishka, Momavaka, Monterey Riesling, Moravka, Morawka, Mourton, Movavka, Muschka, Mushka, Mushza, Musza, Nemetskii Rizling, Öesterreicher, Öestreicher, Österreichisch, Oesterreicher, Oesterreicher Gruener, Oestreicher, Pepitraube, Pepltraube, Picardon Blanc, Picardor Blanc, Picardou Blanc, Plant du Reno, Plant du Rhin, Raisin d'Autriche, Raisin d'Autriche Rhin, Rhin, Ronfoliza, Roter Silvaner, Rundblatt, Salfin, Salfin, Salfin Belyi, Salfine Bely, Salvaner, Salvener, Salvenier, Salviner, Scharvaner, Scherwaner, Schönfeilner, Schwabler, Schwäbler, Schwübler, Sedmogradka, Sedmogradska Zelena, Seleni Kleshez, Selenzhiz, Selivan, Silvain Vert, Silvain Vert, Silvanac Zeleni, Silvanac Zelini, Silvanai Zeleni, Silvaner, Silvaner Bianco, Silvaner Bianco Franken, Silvaner Blanc, Silvaner Green, Silvaner Gruen, Silvaner Gruener, Silvaner Verde, Silvaner Vert, Silvaner White, Silvani Zeleni, Silväni Zöld, Silvania, Silvanske, Silvanske Zelene, Silvánske Zelené, Simonstraue, Sonoma, Sonoma Riesling, Sylvan, Sylvan Grape, Sylvan Zeleny, Sylvana Verde, Sylvander B8, Sylvaner B2, Sylvaner Green, Sylvaner Grün, Sylvaner Verde, Sylvaner Vert, Sylvanertraube, Sylvanske Rane, Sylvanske Zelené, Sylvánskeé Zelené, Szemendrianer, Szilvani Fehér, Szilvani Zold, Tschafahndler, Tschafahnler, Weissblanke, Weisser Augustiner, Weisser Öesterreicher, Weisser Silvaner, Yesil Silvaner, Zöeld Szilváni, Zöldsilvani, Zelena, Zelena Sedmogradka, Zelencic, Zeleni Silvanac, Zeleni Silvanec, Zeleni Silvanec, Ziehfaedler, Zierfahndler, Zierfandler, Zierifandel, Zierifandler, Zinifal, Zirfahndl, Zöld Silvani, Zöldsilvani, Zöld Szilváni, Zoeldsilvani, Zoeldsilvani Silvaner, Zöldszilváni.
Taminga	B	12245	Merbein 29-56 x Gewürztraminer	Big Rivers, Blackwood Valley, Murray Darling, Perth Hills	
Tokay (See Muscadelle)					
Torrontés Riojana	B	15162	Criolla Chica = Listán Prieto x Muscat of Alexandria	Pyrenees, Western Plains	Malvasia, Torrontél, Torrontél Riojano, Torrontés
Traminer (Note: Under the heading "Gewurtztraminer)	B	As Savagnin Blanc - 17636	Unknown	Adelaide Hills, Canberra, Gippsland, Hunter Valley, Margaret River, Murray Darling, New England, Pyrenees, Riverina, Riverland, Swan Hill	Adelfranke, Aida, Albarin Blanco, Auvernat Blanc, Banc Court, Beaunié, Blanc Brun, Blanc Court, Bon Blanc, Brynšt, Christkindlestraube, Del Reno Gentile, Del Reno Gentile Bianco, Dreifpenningholz, Dreimänner, Drumin, Edel Traube, Edeltraube, Edler Weiss, Fehér Tramini, Feuille Ronde, Fleischweiner, Forment, Formentin, Formentin Blanc, Fourmentans, Fourmanteau, Fränkisch, Fränkisch Weiß, Fräntsch, Franconian, Franken, Frankisch, Frennschen, Frenschen Weiß, Frentsch, Frentschen, Fromentais, Fromente, Fromente Blanc, Fromenteau, Fromentin, Furiant, Gelber Traminer, Gelbedler, Gentil Blanc, Gentile Blanc, Gringet, Gründel, Haida, Heida, Heidenwein, Kleinblättrigge Ximenestraube, Kleinbraun, Kleiner Traminer, Klevner, Malvoisie, Marzimmer, Meunier Blanc, Naturé, Naturé Blanc, Naturel, Noble Vert, Noble White, Païen, Plant Païen, Poligny, Princ Bily, Prync, Rauschling, Rotfrensch, Ryvola Bila, Salvagnin, Sauvagnin, Sauvagneux, Sauvagnien, Sauvagnin, Sauvagnun, Sauvagnon, Sauvoignin, Savagnin, Savagnin Blanc, Savagnin Jaune, Savagnin Vert, Savoignin, Schleitheimer, Servoignier, Servoyen Blanc, Svenie, Tokayer, Tramin, Tramin Biely, Tramín Bíly, Traminac, Traminec Beli, Trimac Bijeli, Traminec, Traminer Alb Auriu, Traminer Bianco, Traminer Blanc, Traminer d'Oré, Traminer Doré, Traminer Gelb, Traminer Weiß, Traminer Weißer, Viclair, Vigne Blanche, Vigne du Marechal, Weiß Blaue, Weiß Fränkische, Weiß Frenschen, Weißedler, Weißer Traminer, Weißfrennschen, Weißklövner, White Noble, Ximenesia Microphylla
Trebbiano Toscano	B	12628	Unknown	Adelaide Plains, Barossa Valley, Beechworth, Central Western Australian, Eden Valley, Geelong, Glenrowan, Heathcote, Hilltops, King Valley, Mclaren Vale, Margaret River, Mudgee, Murray Darling, North East Victoria, Orange, Peel, Perth Hills, Queensland Zone, Riverina, Rutherglen, South Coast, Swan District, Swan Valley	Albano, Alfrocheiro Branco, Armenian, Balsamina Bianca, Beou, Beu, Bianca di Botticina, Bianca di Poviglio, Biancame, Bianchello, Bianchetto, Biancone, Biancuccio, Biancuva, Blanc Auba, Blanc Bacca, Blanc de Cadillac, Blancoun, Bobiana, Bona, Bonan Beon, Bonebeon, Bonebeou, Boriano, Botticino Bianca, Boua, Bouan, Bragrunha, Branquinha, Brocanico, Brucanico, Bubbiano, Bubiano, Buriano, Buzzetto, Cadillac, Cadillate, Castelli, Castelli Romani, Castillone, Chantar, Chatar, Chator, Chauche Gris, Clairette à Grains Ronds, Clairette d'Afrique, Clairette de Afrique, Clairette de Vence, Clairette Ronde, Coda di Cavallo, Coda di Volpe, Douradina Branco, Douradinha, Douradinha dos Vinhos Verdes, Douradinho, Elba, Engana Rapazes, Espadeiro Branco, Eugana Repazes, Falanchina, Francesina, Greco, Greco Bianchello, Greco Bianco, Gredelin, Hermitage White, Inji Ban, Juni Blan, Lugana, Maccabeo, Malvasia, Malvasia Fina, Montonico, Morbidella, Morterille Blanche, Muscadet Aigre, Padeiro Branco, Paduro Branco, Passarena, Passerina, Pera de Bode, Perugino, Procanico, Procanico dell'Isola d'Elba, Procanico Portoferraio, Queue de Renard, Queue du Renard, Rassola, Regrat, Rogoznička, Rolle, Romani, Rossan de Nicee, Rossela Blanco, Rossetto, Rossola, Rossola Brandinca, Rossola Brandisca, Rossula, Rossula Brandinca, Rosula, Roussan, Roussane, Roussea, Rusciola, Russola, Saint Émilion, Saint-Émilion, Saint-Émilion des Charentes, Saint-Émillion, Santoro, Senese, Shiraz White, Šijaka, Sinese, Spoletino, St. Émilion, St. Éemilion des Charentes, Tália, Thalia, Trebbiana Fiorentina, Trebbianello, Trebbiano, Trebbiano Casale, Trebbiano d'Empoli, Trebbiano de Toscana, Trebbiano della Fiamma, Trebbiano di Cesena, Trebbiano di Cesene, Trebbiano di Empoli, Trebbiano di Cesena, Trebbiano di Empoli, Trebbiano di Lucca, Trebbiano di Tortona, Trebbiano di Toscana, Trebbiano Fiorentino, Trebbiano Forte, Trebbiano Giallo, Trebbiano Perugino, Trebbiano Toscano Bijeli, Trebbianollo, Trebbianone, Trebiano Toskano, Tribbiano, Tribbiano Forte, Tribiana Weiß, Trubbianello, Turbiano, Ugni Biancu, Ugni Blanc, Uni Belyi, Unji Blan, Uva Bianca, Uva Morbidella, White Hermitage, White Shiraz, Yuni Blan
Tulillah (Note: This variety was developed by A J Antcliff at the former CSIRO Research Station, Merbein, Victoria. First released in 1966, two samples were sent to FPS, Tulillah 1 in 1976 and Tulillah II in 1985. A tissue cultured sample of Tulillah (labelled as 01.1 was qualified for inclusion in FPS's Russell Ranch Foundation Vineyard. It was described as "a high-yielding white wine variety".)	B	Viura = Macabeo x Sultanina	12725	Unknown	
Verdejo	B	As Verdejo Blanco - 12949	Castellana Blanca x Savagnin Blanc = Traminer	Alpine Valleys, Barossa Valley, Clare Valley, Eden Valley, Geographe, Murray Darling, Perth Hills, Riverland,	Albillo de Nava, Albillo Nava, Boto de Gall, Botón de Gallo Blanco, Cepa de Madrigal, Gouvelo, Verdal del Pais, Verdeja, Verdeja Blanca, Verdejo Blanco, Verdejo Palido, Verdelho
Verdelho	B	As Verdelho Branco - 22304	Savagnin Blanc = Traminer x ?	Central WA, Cowra, Geographe, Gold Coast Hinterland, Granite Belt, Heathcote, Hilltops, Hunter Valley, Langhorne Creek, McLaren Vale, Manjimup, Murray Darling, Peel, Pemberton, Perricoota, Perth Hills, Riverina, Riverland, South Burnett, Swan District, Swan Hill, Swan Valley, Western Plains, Yarra Valley	Arinto da Terceira, Vedelho de Pico, Verdelho, Verdelho Branco, Verdelho Branco dos Açores, Verdelho da Madeira, Verdelho de Madeire, Verdelho dos Açores, Verdelho Pico, Verdellio, Verdello, Verdello de Galicia, Verdello no Peluda Finca Natero, Weißer Verdelho
Verduzzo Friulano< (Note: Higgs comments that Verduzzo has not gained much ground in Australia.)	B	12976	Vela Pergola x ?	Alpine Valleys, Hunter Valley, King Valley, Mornington Peninsula, Orange, Yarra Valley	Ramandolo, Ramandolo Dorato, Romandolo, Vedùzz, Verdicchio Friulano, Verdiso Friulano, Verdùç, Verdùz, Verdùzz, Verduzzo, Verduzzo di Motta, Verduzzo di Ramandolo, Verduzzo Giallo, Verduzzo Trevigiano, Verduzzo Verde
Vermentino	B	12989	Unknown	Alpine Valleys, Barossa Valley, Central WA, Denmark, Geographe, McLaren Vale, Murray Darling, Padthaway, Perth Hills, Riverina, Riverland, South Burnett, Swan District, Swan Hill, Swan Valley	Agostenga, Agostenga Blanc, Albanaccio, Barbantina, Barmintinu, Brustiano di Corsica, Carbes, Carbesso, Carica l'Asino, Carica l'Asino Bianco, Cermentinu, Favorita, Favorita Bianca, Favorita Bianca di Conegliano, Favorita d'Alba, Favoritia di Alba, Favorita di Conegliano, Formentino, Fourmentin, Furmentin, Garbesso, Garbessu, Grosse Clarette, Karija l'Osue, Malvasia, Malvasia à Bonifacio, Malvasia Bonifacio, Malvasia de Corse, Malvasia Grossa, Malvasie, Malvoisie, Malvoisie à Gros Grains, Malvoisie Corse, Malvoisie de Corse, Malvoisie du Douro, Malvoisie Précoce d'Espagne, Parlano, Piccabon, Piga, Pigato, Pizzamosca, Rolle, Rollé, Rosesse, Sapaiola, Sibirkovski, Uva Vermentina, Valentin, Vannentino, Varlantin, Varlentin, Varmintina, Varresana Bianca, Venentino, Vennentino, Verlantin, Verlentin, Vermentile, Vermentini, Vermentino Bianco, Vermentino di Gallura, Vermentino Pigato, Vermentinu, Vernaccia
Villard Blanc	B	13081	Siebel 6468 x Subereux	Hastings River, Northern River	12375 Seyve Villard, 12375 SV, Eger 2, S>V> 12-375, Seiv Villar 12-375, Seyve Villard 12-375, Seyve Villard 12375, SV 12-375
Viognier	B	13106	Unknown	Adelaide Hills, Albany, Beechworth, Barossa Valley, Blackwood Valley, Canberra, Coonawarra, Cowra, Eden Valley, Frankland River, Geelong, Gold Coast Hinterland, Granite Belt, Heathcote, Kangaroo Island, Margaret River, Murray Darling, Orange, Pemberton, Perth Hills, Riverina, Riverland, Shoalhaven Coast, South Burnett, Southern Fleurieu, Swan District, Swan Hill, Yarra Valley	Galopine, Petit Viognier, Petit Vionnier, Viogné, Viogner, Viognier Bijeli, Viognier Blanc, Viognier Jaune, Viognier Vert, Vionjer, Vionnier, Vionnier Jaune, Vionnier Petit, Vionnier Vert
Waltham Cross (See Afus Ali)					

== Supplemental references used for charts ==
- Anderson, Kym, and Signe Nelgen. Which Winegrape is Grown Where?: A Global Empirical Picture, Revised Edition. Edited by Kym Anderson and N R Aryal. University of Adelaide Press, 2020. ISBN 978-1-925261-86-8 Published online 2020. ISBN 978-1-925261-87-5. Accessed 2 February 2021. (Databases relevant to this book can be accessed in Excel spreadsheet format at
- "FPS Grape Registry: Grapevine Varieties." Foundation Plant Services (FPS), College of Agricultural and Environmental Sciences, University of California, Davis. Accessed 23 February 2020.
- Halliday, James, et al. Halliday Wine Companion. Accessed 9 March 2020.
- _____. James Halliday's Wine Atlas of Australia. Hardie Grant, 2014. ISBN 1-74270-396-8.
- _____. Varietal Wines: A guide to 130 varieties grown in Australia and their place in the international wine landscape. Hardie Grant Books, 2015. ISBN 1-74270-860-9.
- Higgs, Darby. Vinodiversity. Accessed 5 March 2020.
- Maul, Erika, et al. Vitis International Variety Catalogue. (VIVC). Julius Kühn-Institut - Federal Research Centre for Cultivated Plants (JKI), Institute for Grapevine Breeding - Geilweilerhof. Accessed 7 March 2020.
- Robinson, Jancis. Vines, Grapes & Wines: A wine drinker's guide to grape varieties. Mitchell Beazley, 1986. ISBN 1-85732-999-6.
- Robinson, Julia Harding et al. The Oxford Companion to Wine. 4th Edition. Edited by Jancis Robinson and Julia Harding. Oxford University Press, 2015. ISBN 978-0-19-870538-3.
- Robinson, Harding and José Vouillamoz. Wine Grapes: A complete guide to 1,368 vine varieties, including their origins and flavours. HarperCollins, 2013. ISBN 0-14-196882-6. Access available online at Apple Books. ISBN 0-06-232551-5 Accessed 7 March 2020.
- Tischelmayer, Norbert, et al. "Glossary." Wein-Plus. (WPG) Accessed 7 March 2020.
- Wine Australia. (WA) Accessed 7 March 2020.
- Wine-Searcher. Grape Varieties.. Accessed 7 March 2020.
