= Alpine Valleys =

Region in North East Victoria, Australia

Coordinates: 36°43′36.57″S 146°56′57.02″E

- Wine region
- Type: Australian Geographical Indication
- Year established: 1999
- Country: Australia
- Part of: North East Victoria
- Climate region: Maritime
- Heat units: 1482
- Precipitation (annual average): 425 millimetres (16.7 in)

The Alpine Valleys is an Australian wine region on the western slopes of the Victorian Alps in northeast Victoria. It was registered as an Australian Geographical Indication on 29 November 1999 It is bounded to the west by the King Valley and to the north by the Beechworth wine region. The area is distinctly cooler in climate than some of the other northeast wine regions like Rutherglen. The Alpine Valleys produce grapes primarily for table wine production.

The Alpine Valleys wine region includes the valleys of the Ovens, Buffalo, Buckland and Kiewa rivers. Towns in the region include Myrtleford and Bright.

Small quantities of tea are grown and produced in the Alpine Valleys.

== See also ==
- Victorian wine
