= Brustiano faux =

Variety of grape

- Grape (Vitis)
- Color of berry skin: Blanc
- Species: Vitis vinifera
- Origin: France
- Formation of seeds: Complete
- Sex of flowers: Hermaphrodite
- VIVC number: 41642

Brustiano faux is an indigenous French wine grape that is no longer in cultivation in France as of 2010. The variety is currently preserved by the Centre de Ressources Biologiques de la Vigne, a division of the INRA in France.

Despite its unknown origins and complete disappearance from the vineyard, it is the male progenitor of the two very important modern commercial varieties Macabeu and Xarel·lo as well as the rarer variety Plant de Cervera, all originating in Catalonia from crossings with the female vine Hebén.
