= Tasmanian wine =

Wine produced in Tasmania, Australia

Tasmania
- Wine region
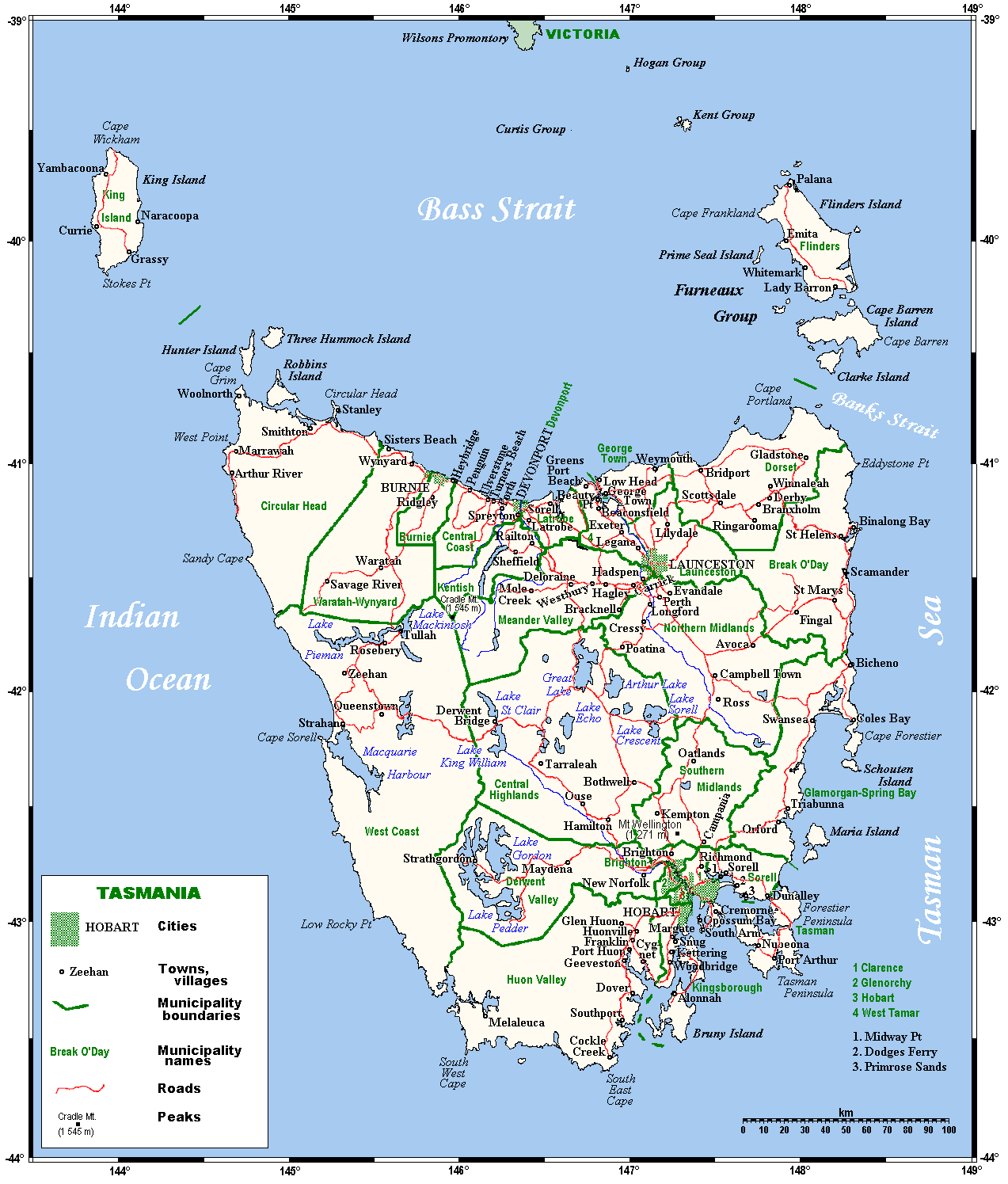
- Country: Australia
- Climate region: Maritime
- Precipitation (annual average): 27 inches (680 mm) average; varies widely according to terrain
- Soil conditions: Clay
- Size of planted vineyards: 1,289 acres (5.22 km^{2})
- No. of vineyards: 112+
- Grapes produced: Pinot noir, Chardonnay, Riesling
- No. of wineries: nearly 200
- Wine produced: Still, dessert wine, sparkling wine

Tasmanian wine is wine produced in the Australian state of Tasmania. Located at a more southerly latitude than the rest of Australia's wine regions, Tasmania has a cooler climate and the potential to make distinctly different wines than in the rest of the country. The area grows primarily Pinot noir, Chardonnay and Sauvignon blanc, with some smaller plantings of Riesling, Pinot gris and Cabernet Sauvignon. Global warming has had positive effects on the Tasmanian wine industry, allowing most of the grapes in the past few vintages (as of 2005) to ripen fully and produce more vibrant wine.

== History ==
Tasmania was one of the earliest regions in Australia to be planted with vines and was even the source of cuttings for the first vineyards in Victoria and South Australia. It was also home to some of the earliest wines to gain attention outside of the county with a fortified dessert wine by Bartholomew Broughton being praised by one English writer as Australia's equivalent to Port.

== Climate and geography ==
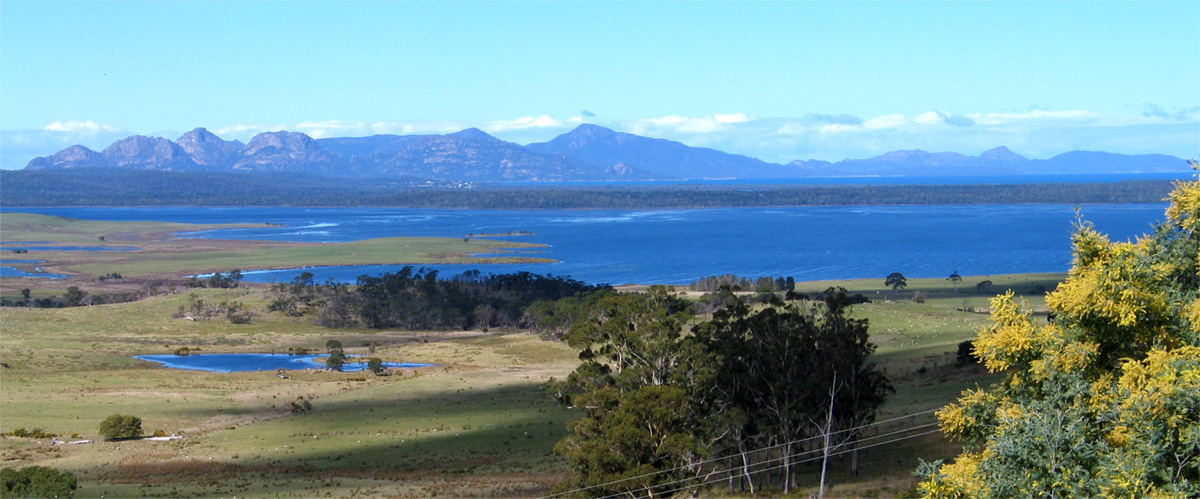
The Freycinet Peninsula has shown itself to be one of the more promising areas for Tasmanian red wine production.

Being an island, Tasmania has a temperate climate that is marked by the strong winds of the Indian Ocean, Bass Strait and Tasman Sea. These winds necessitate the use of large screens around the perimeter of vineyards in order to protect the grapevines. The cool climate of the regions gives way to a late harvest typically around April. The effects of global warming have caused the area's grapes to progressively ripen slightly earlier which has allowed most of the recent vintages to be successful. It has opened up the prospects of increasing red wine production with Cabernet Sauvignon, Merlot and Shiraz.

== Wine regions ==
The majority of Tasmania's vineyards are located near the cities of Launceston in the north and Hobart in the south. Most of the area of Tasmania is well suited for the production of dry, aromatic white wines but the warmer Coal River Valley and Freycinet Peninsula are starting to distinguish themselves with red wines.

- North West - south of Devonport
- Tamar Valley - along the valley north of Launceston
- Pipers River - on the Georgetown to Bridport road.
- East Coast - between Bicheno in the north, and east of Sorell
- Coal River Valley - between Cambridge and north of Colebrook.
- Derwent Valley - between Hamilton and Hobart
- Huon Valley - between Kingston and Southport

== Wines ==
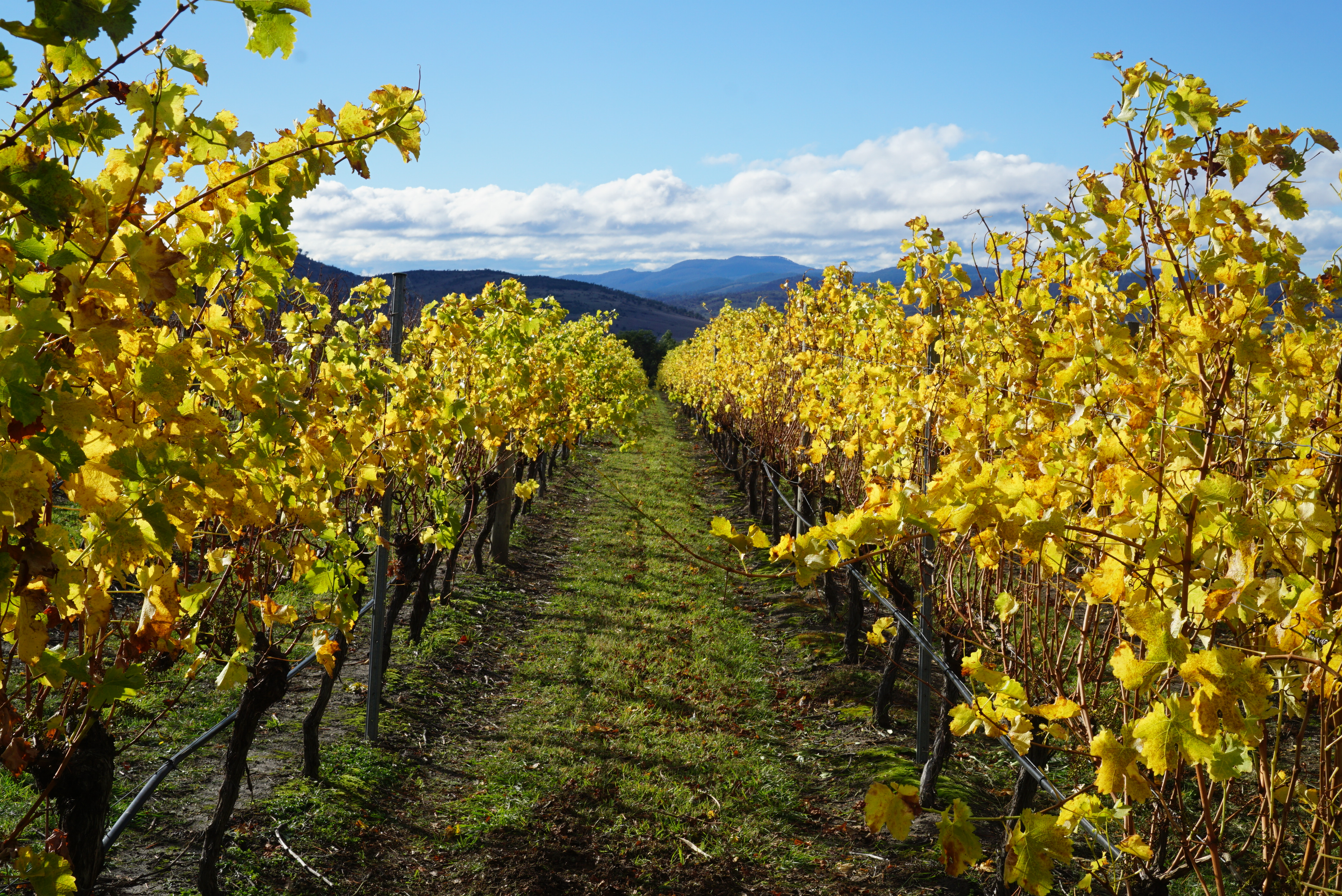
A vineyard outside of Hobart

The region's cool climate has made Tasmania a good location for the production of sparkling wine with many of Australia's mainland producers having production facilities on the island to make the base cuvée that is later transported to the winery's main facility. Even some French Champagne houses have taken notice with companies like Moët et Chandon using some Tasmanian grapes for the Australian sparkling wines. Tasmanian Rieslings have begun to gain notice for their closer similarities to a Mosel Riesling than that which is typically produced in Australia.

Tasmania enjoys a global reputation as a leading producer of premium cool climate wines, winning high praise and accolades from wine judges and critics alike.

Terroir

The Tasmanian landscape is dominated by dolerite-capped mountains that shelter the state’s wine regions from high winds and rainfall. On the lower slopes, the vineyard soils are formed from ancient sandstones and mudstones and also from more recent river sediments and igneous rocks of volcanic origin.

Cool climate advantage

Tasmania has a moderate maritime climate, cooled by prevailing westerly winds off the Southern Ocean, providing conditions free of extremes in temperature. Mild spring and summer temperatures, with warm autumn days and cool nights allow the grapes to ripen slowly on the vine, resulting in maximum varietal flavour development. This is achieved without losing that essential natural acidity that gives wine both freshness and balance.

Vintage

The Tasmanian vintage usually begins from mid-March, at the peak of the dry autumn when ripening occurs, to late May before the risk of frost and rain.

Vintage variations are greater in Tasmania than any other Australian region. This vintage variation is reflected in each unique wine and makes for an insightful tasting of multiple vintages from the same producer.

Tasmanian wine statistics

The following provides an overview of the Tasmanian wine sector. In Tasmania there are approximately:

- 160 licensed wine producers
- 230 individual vineyards
- 90 cellar door outlets
- 1500 hectares under vine.
- More than 11,000 tonnes of wine grapes were processed in the 2013 vintage. This represents around 0.5% of Australia’s total winegrape production.

The majority of Tasmania’s grapes are grown in:

- the Tamar Valley wine growing area, which produces approximately 40%
- the East Coast wine growing area, which produces approximately 20%
- the North East (Pipers River) wine growing area, which produces approximately 19%
- the Coal River Valley wine growing area, which produces approximately 13%
- The remaining wine growing areas, including the Derwent Valley, North West and the Huon/Channel, contributed approximately 9% to the total harvest in 2013.

Cool climate grape varieties most common in the state are:

- Pinot Noir - 44% (used for both table and sparkling wine)
- Chardonnay - 23% (used for both table and sparkling wine)
- Sauvignon Blanc - 12%
- Pinot Gris - 11%
- Riesling - 5%
- Other varieties include Cabernet Sauvignon, Merlot and Gewürztraminer.

== See also ==
- Australian wine
- Tasmanian beer
