= North East Victoria =

Coordinates: 36°27′36″S 146°36′0″E

- Wine region
- Type: Australian Geographical Indication
- Year established: 1996
- Sub-regions: Alpine Valleys; Beechworth; Glenrowan; King Valley; Rutherglen

North East Victoria is an Australian Geographical Indication for a wine zone in the Australian state of Victoria. It includes five named wine regions:

- Alpine Valleys
- Beechworth
- Glenrowan
- King Valley
- Rutherglen

== Geography ==
The North East Victoria zone includes the western slopes of the Great Dividing Range and is bounded on the north side by the Murray River. When it was defined, it included the Shires of Beechworth, Benalla, Bright, Chiltern, Myrtleford, Oxley, Rutherglen, Tallangatta, Upper Murray, Wangaratta, Yackandandah, and parts of the Shires of Tungamah and Yarrawonga as well as the City of Benalla, the City of Wangaratta and the Rural City of Wodonga.
