= Perricoota =

- Wine region
- Type: Australian Geographical Indication
- Year established: 1999
- Country: Australia
- Part of: Big Rivers
- Heat units: 2100
- Precipitation (annual average): 224 millimetres (8.8 in)

Perricoota is a wine region in the Big Rivers grape-growing area of Australia. It covers the area of New South Wales bordered on the south by the Murray River between Barmah and Torrumbarry (both are on the Victorian side of the river, so not in this region) with Moama near the centre. The town of Womboota is near the northwestern extent of the region. The name was registered on 25 March 1999.

Perricoota region is named for the historic Perricoota Station pastoral run that was established in the area in the 1850s. Despite being a long way from the coast, it is at an altitude of only 100 metres (330 ft).

Most vineyards in this region are irrigated from the Murray River.
