= Glenrowan wine region =

Glenrowan
- Wine region
- Type: Australian Geographical Indication
- Year established: 2003
- Country: Australia
- Part of: North East Victoria
- Heat units: 1750
- Precipitation (annual average): 310
- No. of vineyards: 13
- Varietals produced: Shiraz
- No. of wineries: 7
- Wine produced: Shiraz, fortified wine

The Glenrowan wine region is a wine growing region in the Australian state of Victoria, including the town of Glenrowan.

"Glenrowan" was entered in the Register of Protected Names on 14 October 2003 as the name of a region.

The region surrounds Lake Mokoan and includes the towns of Glenrowan, Winton, Thoona and the western part of Wangaratta and northeastern part of Benalla. It extends a small amount southeast of the Hume Highway, and further to the north and west. The Midland Highway is part of the southwestern boundary and the Wangaratta-Yarrawonga Road (C374) is the northeastern boundary.

The first vines were planted by Varley Bailey on his father's property in 1866. The region was devastated by phylloxera in the 1890s but quickly replanted on resistant rootstocks. There are now 13 growers and seven cellar doors.

== See also ==
- Victorian wine
