= Rutherglen wine region =

Wine producing area in Victoria, Australia

Rutherglen
- Wine region
- Type: Australian Geographical Indication
- Country: Australia
- Part of: North East Victoria
- Varietals produced: Cabernet Sauvignon, Carignan, Durif, Gewurtztraminer, Muscat, Semillon, Shiraz, Tokay (Muscadelle)
- No. of wineries: 18

Rutherglen is a wine-producing area around the town of Rutherglen in North East Victoria zone of the state of Victoria in Australia. The area is particularly noted for its sweet fortified wines.

== Climate and geography ==
Rutherglen features a Mediterranean climate (Csa) with hot, dry summers and cool, damp winters. Climate data is sourced from Rutherglen Research; established in 1912 and still operating today. It is at an elevation of 175 metres (574 ft).

The highest temperature recorded was 46.8 °C (116.2 °F) on 14 January 1939, whereas the lowest was −7.5 °C (18.5 °F) on 14 June 2006.

Climate data for Rutherglen Research (1912–2020); 175 m AMSL; 36° 06′ 16.92″ S
Month	Jan	Feb	Mar	Apr	May	Jun	Jul	Aug	Sep	Oct	Nov	Dec	Year
Record high °C (°F)	46.8 (116.2)	45.6 (114.1)	40.2 (104.4)	35.5 (95.9)	28.7 (83.7)	22.2 (72.0)	22.5 (72.5)	24.9 (76.8)	32.2 (90.0)	38.9 (102.0)	41.8 (107.2)	45.6 (114.1)	46.8 (116.2)
Mean daily maximum °C (°F)	31.5 (88.7)	30.8 (87.4)	27.4 (81.3)	22.0 (71.6)	17.0 (62.6)	13.4 (56.1)	12.4 (54.3)	14.0 (57.2)	17.2 (63.0)	21.1 (70.0)	25.5 (77.9)	29.3 (84.7)	21.8 (71.2)
Mean daily minimum °C (°F)	13.8 (56.8)	13.9 (57.0)	11.0 (51.8)	7.1 (44.8)	4.3 (39.7)	2.5 (36.5)	2.1 (35.8)	2.7 (36.9)	4.1 (39.4)	6.2 (43.2)	8.7 (47.7)	11.5 (52.7)	7.3 (45.2)
Record low °C (°F)	1.9 (35.4)	1.2 (34.2)	−0.9 (30.4)	−3.2 (26.2)	−6.1 (21.0)	−7.5 (18.5)	−6.9 (19.6)	−6.1 (21.0)	−5.3 (22.5)	−5.1 (22.8)	−2.8 (27.0)	0.0 (32.0)	−7.5 (18.5)
Average precipitation mm (inches)	36.4 (1.43)	37.6 (1.48)	38.5 (1.52)	39.5 (1.56)	51.8 (2.04)	56.4 (2.22)	61.1 (2.41)	60.2 (2.37)	53.7 (2.11)	56.9 (2.24)	45.0 (1.77)	44.3 (1.74)	581.4 (22.89)
Average precipitation days (≥ 0.2 mm)	5.1	4.9	5.2	6.7	9.9	12.4	14.4	14.0	10.9	9.6	7.6	6.2	106.9

== Grapes and wine ==
A wide variety of grapes flourish in Rutherglen thanks to its sunny and dry climate. Grapes grown in this region include Durif, Muscat, Tempranillo, Marsanne, chardonnay, cabernet sauvignon, Shiraz, Tokay (Muscadelle).

== Wineries ==
=== Winemakers of Rutherglen ===
The Winemakers of Rutherglen formed into a membership based incorporated association in 1992. 18 wineries now make up the Winemakers of Rutherglen. Member wineries are All Saints Estate, Anderson Winery, Andrew Buller Wines, Buller Wines, Campbells Wines, Chambers Rosewood, Cofield Wines, John Gehrig wines, Jones winery, Morris wines, Mount Prior vineyard, Pfeiffer wines, Rutherglen estates, Scion vineyard, Stanton & Killeen, St Leonards vineyard, Valhalla wines, Warrabilla wines,

=== Other Rutherglen wineries ===
In recent years, Rutherglen has seen a number of smaller new wineries emerge varying in size and production. Some have opted to open a cellar door.

- Calico Town Wines
- Lilliput Wines

== Bibliography ==
- Wine styles of Rutherglen by Australian wine critic, James Halliday
- Rutherglen Tokay and Muscat by U.S. wine critic Robert M. Parker, Jr.
