= Hebén =

Variety of grape

- Grape (Vitis)
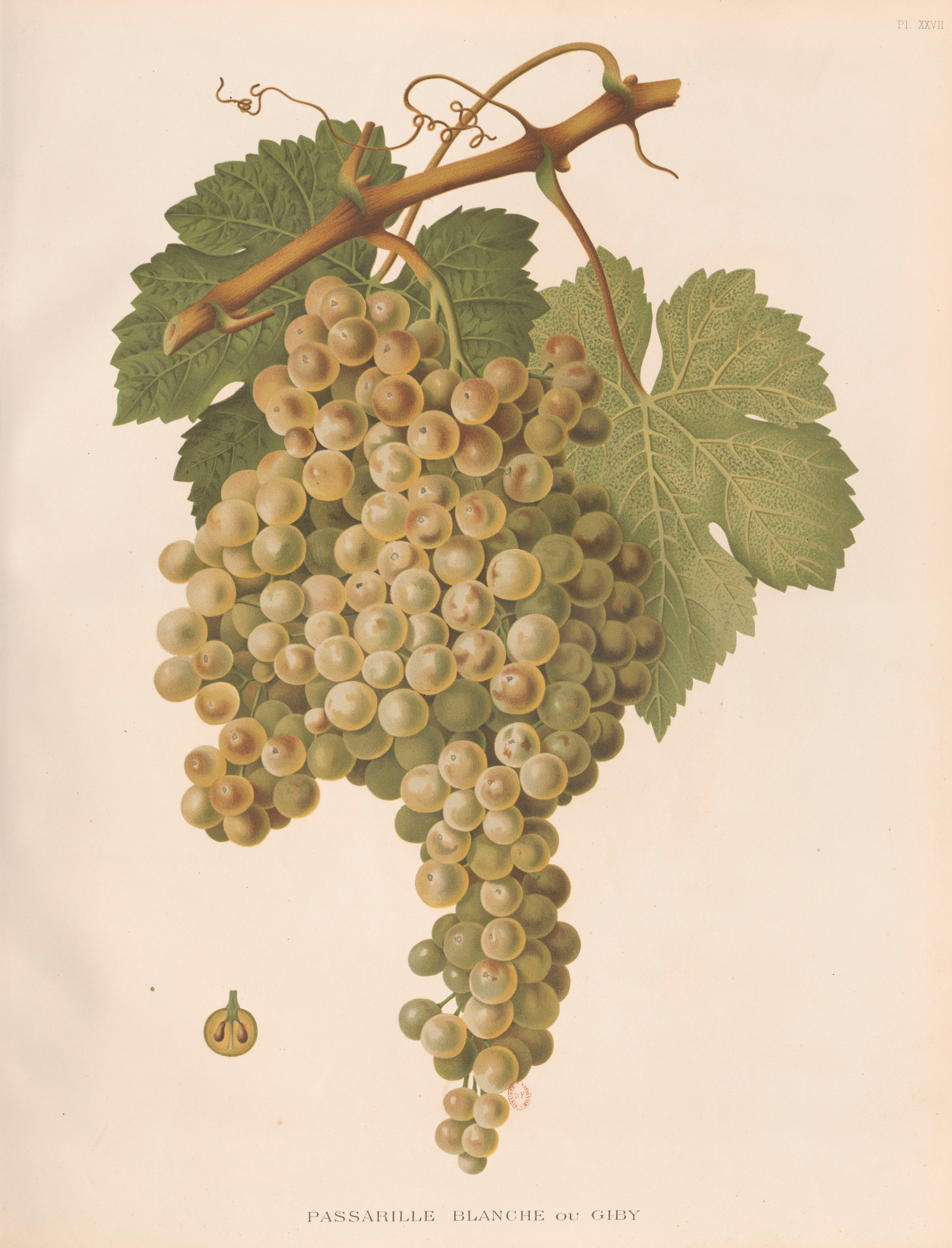
- Color of berry skin: Blanc
- Species: Vitis vinifera
- Also called: Gibi, Mourisco Branco, Passerille blanche
- Origin: Spain
- Notable regions: Andalusia
- Formation of seeds: Complete
- Sex of flowers: Female
- VIVC number: 5335

Hebén is a very rare white grape variety grown for wine and table grapes in Spain.

== History ==
It is an ancient variety found to have originated as a table grape in North Africa as Gibi. It is the parent variety of a large number of grapes grown in the Iberian Peninsula and the wider Mediterranean. It has paired with Alfrocheiro to produce the rare Portuguese varieties Trincadeira das pratas, Tinta grossa, Castelão branco, and Malvasia fina, as well as the Spanish Allarén. With Muscat of Alexandria it has produced Moscatel nunes/Nuno gomes in Portugal and Moscatel de Angüés in Spain. In Spain, it has a parent relationship with some very widely grown varieties: Airén, Cayetana, Viura, Xarel·lo, and Pedro Ximénez. In total, around 60 offspring varieties have been identified. Its sparse bunches are an attribute that can be seen some in children varieties such as Pedro Ximénez and Xarello. It produces solely female flowers, unlike the majority of self-pollinating vinifera varieties grown for wine today.
