= Kingston Estate =

Kingston Estate Wines
- Location: Peterson Road, Kingston-on-Murray SA 5331, SA, Australia
- Coordinates: 34°13′51″S 140°20′19″E
- Founded: 1985
- Key people: Bill Moularadellis
- Known for: Petit Verdot
- Varietals: Cabernet Sauvignon, Shiraz, Chardonnay, Merlot, Chardonnay, Petit Verdot
- Distribution: International
- Website: Official website

Kingston Estate winery was established in 1979 by Sarantos and Constantina Moularadellis.

It is a family-owned winery now in the care of Bill Moularadellis. He expanded the business by developing vineyards throughout the Riverland and sourcing grapes from farmers in Adelaide Hills, Coonawarra, Clare Valley, and Langhorne Creek.

As at 2022 Kingston is Australia's sixth-largest winemaker in terms of total wine production, and eighth largest in terms of total revenue. It's Riverland winery at Kingston-on-Murray produces more than a million cases of wine each year. The winery has a milling capacity of 110,000 tonnes per year, and a storage capacity of 117 million liters. Kingston is located in one of Australia’s main wine-producing regions. About 30% of South Australia's wine is made within a 40-kilometer radius of the Kingston winery.

== History ==
1956: Sarantos and Constantina Moularadellis emigrate independently from Greece and settle in South Australia's Riverland.

1961: The Moularadellis family purchased a small fruit block in Kingston-on-Murray.

1965: The family purchased a second 40-acre Riverland property planted with Shiraz, Cabernet Sauvignon and Merlot vines. Initially, grapes from this property were sold to major wine producers.

1979: Kingston Estate is established.

1985: Eldest son Bill Moularadellis (born 1964) graduated in oenology from Roseworthy Agricultural College and joined the family business.

1986: Bill Moularadellis crushed his first vintage of 60 tonnes, principally red, and produced Kingston Estate's first commercial output of some 4500 cases. Bill began to look into export markets, including the UK and Sweden. enology

1994: Kingston was awarded South Australian Business of the Year as well as the Kingston Estate 1991 Reserve Chardonnay and won double gold at the San Francisco International Wine Show and the Hyatt Advertiser Award for South Australia's best Chardonnay.

1998: Kingston expands its vineyards, planting about 300 acres of vines on the Sturt Highway, opposite the winery Year Kingston-on-Murray. A further 200 acres were planted in 1999. Key components of this expansion were merlot and petit verdot, until then little known in Australia.

1999: Bill Moularadellis offers long-term contracts to grape growers in other South Australian regions. Approximately 30 percent of the winery's grape intake is now from other premium regions throughout South Australia, including the Clare Valley, Adelaide Hills, Langhorne Creek, and the Limestone Coast wine zone.

2000: Kingston Estate acquired Swan Hill, based in Ashwood Grove.

2001: Kingston Estate launched its Kingston Estate Echelon Selection range, focusing on non-mainstream grape varieties.

2003: The Kingston 2002 Echelon Selection Petit Verdot wins top gold in its class at the 2003 Royal Melbourne Show and is the only non-mainstream red in the taste-off for the Jimmy Watson Memorial Trophy.

2010: Kingston Estate winemaker Donna Hartwig named The Wine Society Members’ Choice Winemaker of the Year at the 2010 Young Winemaker of the Year awards held in Sydney on 12 November 2010

2011: Kingston Estate owner and winemaker Bill Moularadellis appointed to the board of Wine Australia Corporation

2017: Kingston Estate was awarded Australian Shiraz Winery of the Year at the 2017 Berlin International Wine Competition.

2018: Kingston Estate is ranked number 12 in a list of 'Australia's largest wine companies' in terms of sales revenue.

== See also ==
- South Australian Wine
- Australian Wine
