= Wrattonbully =

Wine region in South Australia

Coordinates: 37.0°S 140.8°E

- Wine region
- Type: Australian Geographical Indication
- Year established: 2005
- Country: Australia
- Part of: Limestone Coast zone
- Growing season: October – April
- Climate region: 'I'
- Heat units: 1421
- Precipitation (annual average): 195 mm (7.7 in)
- Size of planted vineyards: 2,679 hectares (6,620 acres)
- Grapes produced: 17,845 tonnes (17,563 long tons; 19,671 short tons)
- Varietals produced: Shiraz, Cabernet Sauvignon, Merlot, Chardonnay
- No. of wineries: 3
- Comments: Climate data: 2011, production: 2014

Wrattonbully is a wine region in the Limestone Coast region of South Australia's South East, between the Padthaway and Coonawarra regions, between the Riddoch Highway and the Victorian border.

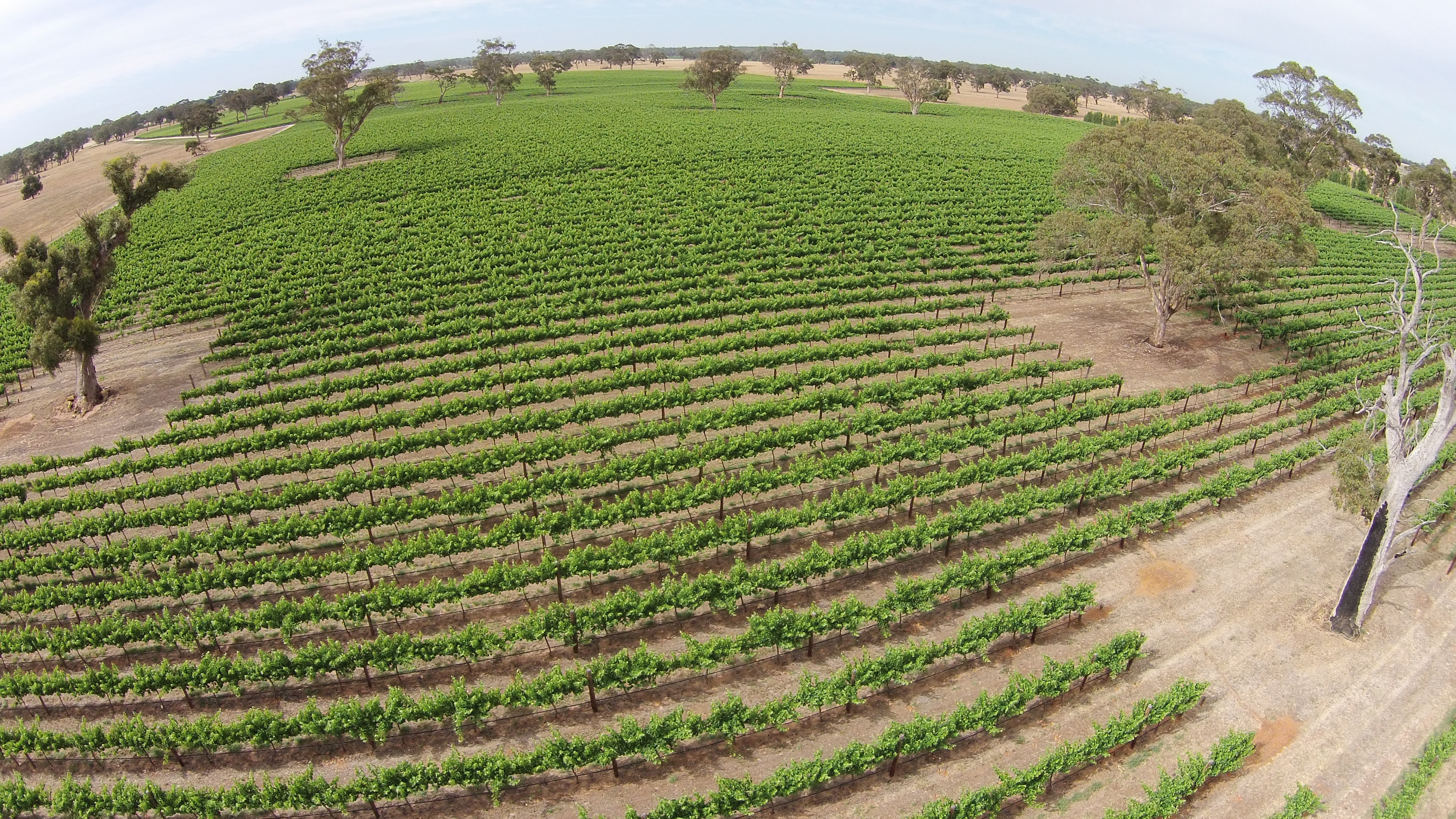
An aerial photo of a vineyard in the Joanna district of Wrattonbully in late spring

The Wrattonbully wine region lies over several ranges in the area surrounding Naracoorte, including the Naracoorte Range (also known as the Kanawinka escarpment).

Wrattonbully is a cavelands region of ancient World Heritage-listed geology, which in more recent times has been chosen to establish a wine region due to its outstanding viticultural attributes like the Terra Rossa over Limestone soils and gently sloping sites creating varied aspect with altitude. A network of limestone caves, notably the Naracoorte Caves National Park situated in the heart of Wrattonbully, contribute significantly to the soil profiles and viticultural practices of the vineyards and the resultant quality of the region's wines.

Wrattonbully's climate is influenced by the Bonney Upwelling, a reliable ocean current of frigid water that swells to the surface each year during Wrattonbully's ripening period, providing for cooling night temperatures that help to create high quality wine grapes. Coupled with the slightly warmer daytime temperatures that Wrattonbully receives, relative to Coonawarra, it can have a wider diurnal temperature swing during the ripening period.

The first vines for winegrapes were planted in the late 1960s; however it was in the 1990s, after the test of time, that the excellent soils and elevated sites attracted many winemakers from surrounding areas to then plant most of the region's vineyards to varieties that had become proven performers like Cabernet Sauvignon, Shiraz, Chardonnay and Merlot. Given that these 1990s plantings, with their modern viticultural standards for high quality wine grape production, are now reaching their maturity, Wrattonbully wine region is starting to realise its potential.

The region now draws attention from winemakers and wine connoisseurs who appreciate the region's wines for their quality, balance, tannic structure and cellarability. Cabernet Sauvignon, Shiraz, Chardonnay and Merlot are the main varieties grown, and Wrattonbully wines of these varieties are highly regarded for their complexity and elegance. More recently, the cool climate of the Wrattonbully wine region is attracting more recent experimental plantings of other varieties, like Malbec.

== See also ==
- South Australian wine

== Citations and references ==
=== References ===
- Longbottom, Mardi; Maschmedt, David and Pichler, Markus (2011), Unearthing viticulture in the Limestone Coast (PDF), ISBN 978-0-646-56744-0
- Phylloxera and Grape Industry Board of SA (PGIBSA) (2014), Australian regional winegrape crush survey online (PDF), Phylloxera and Grape Industry Board of SA, ISSN 1442-6048, archived from the original (PDF) on 6 November 2014
