= Lenswood =

Lenswood may refer to:

- Lenswood, South Australia, a small town in the Adelaide Hills
- Lenswood wine sub-region, an Australian Geographical Indication for grapes grown in a defined area named after the town
- Lenswood Football Club, a former football club now part of the Uraidla Districts Football Club
