= Robe wine region =

Wine region in South Australia

Coordinates: 37.275668°S 139.9164479°E

Robe
- Wine region
- Type: Australian Geographical Indication
- Year established: 2006
- Years of wine industry: since 1994
- Country: Australia
- Part of: Limestone Coast zone
- Climate region: ’I’
- Heat units: 1346
- Precipitation (annual average): 213 mm (8.4 in)
- Size of planted vineyards: 682 ha (1,690 acres)
- No. of vineyards: 13 (2008)
- Grapes produced: 1,136 tonnes (1,118 long tons; 1,252 short tons)
- Varietals produced: Cabernet Sauvignon, Shiraz, Chardonnay, Merlot
- No. of wineries: three
- Comments: climate data: 2011, production: 2012 & 2014.

Robe is a wine region located in the south east of South Australia immediately adjoining the town of Robe. The region received appellation as an Australian Geographical Indication (AGI) in 2006. It is part of the Limestone Coast wine zone.

== Extent and appellation ==
The Robe wine region occupies a section of coastline about 20 kilometres (12 miles) wide extending from the north end of Guichen Bay where it borders the Mount Benson region to Beachport in the south. The Robe wine region was registered as an Australian Geographical Indication on 15 August 2006 and is part of the Limestone Coast zone.

== Grapes and wine ==
As of 2014, the most common plantings in the Robe wine region within a total planted area of 682 ha (1,690 acres) was reported as being Cabernet Sauvignon (33.1%) followed by Shiraz (25.1%), Chardonnay (15.5%) and Merlot (8.5%). Alternatively, red wine varietals account for 74.2%of plantings while white wines varietals account for 26%of plantings. The total 2014 vintage is reported as consisting of 1,136 tonnes (1,118 long tons; 1,252 short tons) of crushed grapes from all varietals. As of 2012, the region had three wineries and as of 2008, it had 13 growers.

== See also ==
- South Australian wine

== Citations and references ==
=== References ===
- Longbottom, Mardi; Maschmedt, David and Pichler, Markus (2011), Unearthing viticulture in the Limestone Coast (PDF), ISBN 978-0-646-56744-0, archived from the original (PDF) on 6 November 2014
- Phylloxera and Grape Industry Board of SA (PGIBSA) (2014), "Australian regional winegrape crush survey online" (PDF), South Australian Winegrape Utilisation and Pricing Surveys, Phylloxera and Grape Industry Board of SA, ISSN 1442-6048, archived from the original (PDF) on 6 November 2014
