= Cygne blanc =

Variety of grape

Cygne blanc is a white Australian wine grape variety that is a seedling of Cabernet Sauvignon that was discovered in 1989 in Western Australia. Unlike Cabernet blanc, which was a crossing of Cabernet Sauvignon and Resistenzpartner, and Shalistin which is a white-berried color mutation of Cabernet Sauvignon, Cygne blanc is a selfling that sprang from a seed of a Cabernet Sauvignon berry that fell on the ground and took root.

Indigenous to Australia, Cygne blanc has been touted as the "first truly Australian grape variety".

== History ==
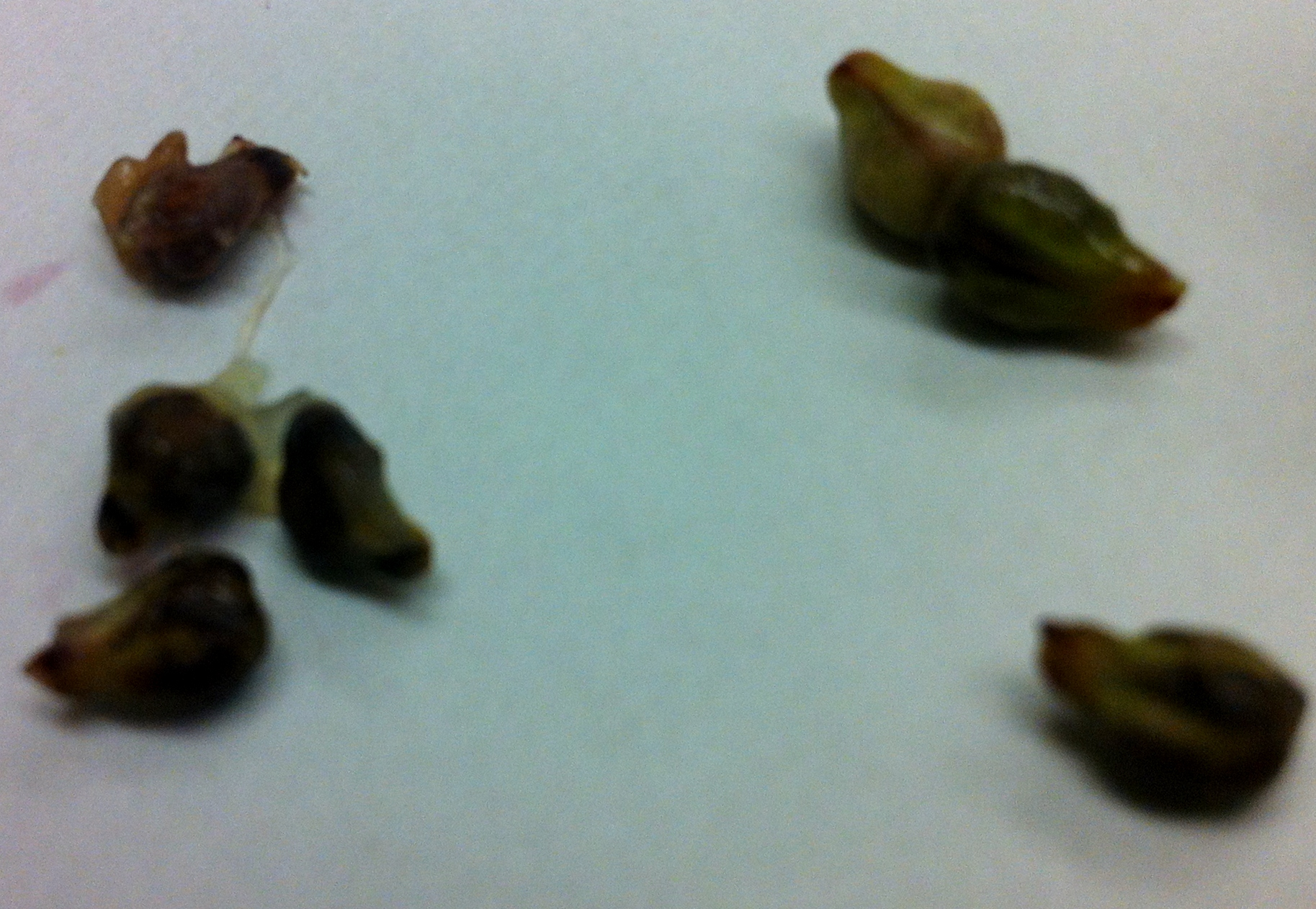
Cygne blanc sprung up as a chance seedling from Cabernet Sauvignon grape seeds that were dropped on the ground and took root in a garden in Baskerville, Western Australia.

Cygne blanc, from the French term for white swan, is named after the Swan Valley where it was discovered in 1989 growing in a garden in Baskerville, Western Australia by Sally Mann, wife of winemaker Dorham Mann and daughter-in-law of Jack Mann, who noticed that the stray vine had leaves similar to Cabernet Sauvignon. The garden was planted next to one of the family's Cabernet Sauvignon vineyard and likely arose from a chance dropping of Cabernet Sauvignon seeds, either from dropped clusters and berries that decomposed, leaving behind the seeds, or from the droppings of birds or other wildlife which previous consumed the seeds and berries of the vine.

Unlike vine cuttings which are clones of the parent vines and color mutations which are mutated vines derived from cuttings, vines propagated from seedlings are distinct varieties with diverse genetics that can lead to the offspring having very different traits from the parent vine, even if the original seed was the result of self-pollination. In the case of Cygne blanc, the grape vine likely inherited its white berried trait from its grandparent, Sauvignon blanc, that crossed with Cabernet Franc to produce the red berried Cabernet Sauvignon.

When it was discovered that the stray vine produced white berries, Dorham Mann decided to propagate the vine in secret and over the course of 8 years planted 2 hectares (4.9 acres) of the grape which he used to produce a white sparkling wine.

== Wine regions ==
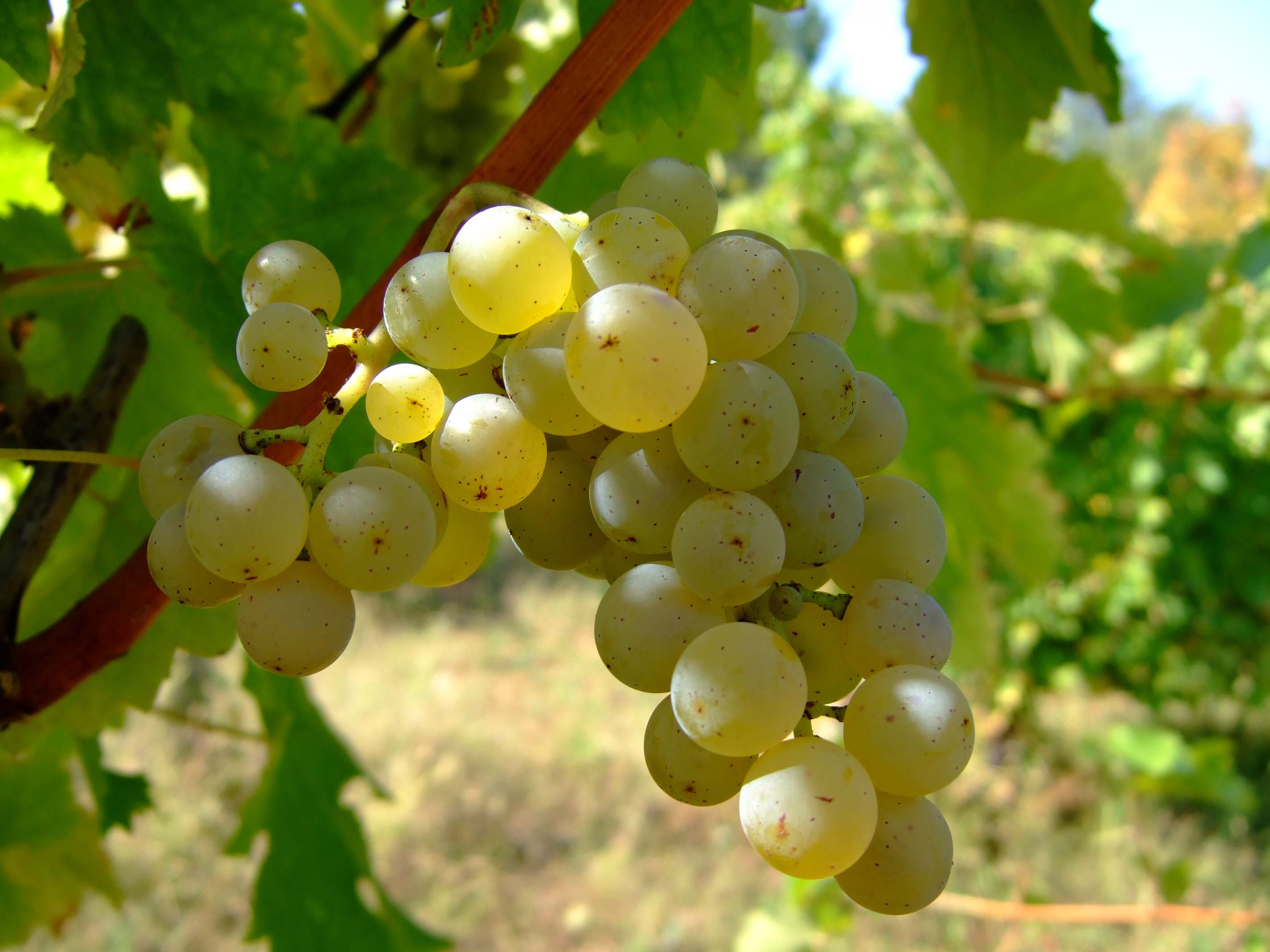
Cygne blanc likely inherited its white berried trait from its grandparent Sauvignon blanc.

In 1999, Cygne blanc was officially added to the list of permitted Australian wine grape varieties. Today plantings of the grape can be found in Western Australia and in the South Australian wine region of the Limestone Coast around Mount Benson. The South Australian plantings are the results of an exclusive license given by the Manns to Port Robe Estate to grow the variety for commercial production until June 2014 when rights to the grapes became available to other growers. In 2006, the first vintage of Cygne blanc (from the 2005 harvest) from Port Robe was released.

== Styles ==
According to Master of Wine Jancis Robinson, Cygne blanc produces white wines that have no overt characteristics of Cabernet Sauvignon apart from a slight herbal, leafy character that can emerge in some examples of the grape. Other wine writers describe the grape as exhibiting some traits reminiscent of a white Hermitage from the Rhône Valley and of Sauvignon blanc from warm climate wine regions.

Graham Cranswick-Smith of Port Robe Estates told Harpers Magazine that the grape produces wines that have a "Cabernet character" but with aroma notes similar to Semillon and flavors of Marsanne and Roussanne.
