= Piccadilly Valley wine sub-region =

Coordinates: 34.97494°N 138.72829°E

Piccadilly Valley sub-region
- Wine region
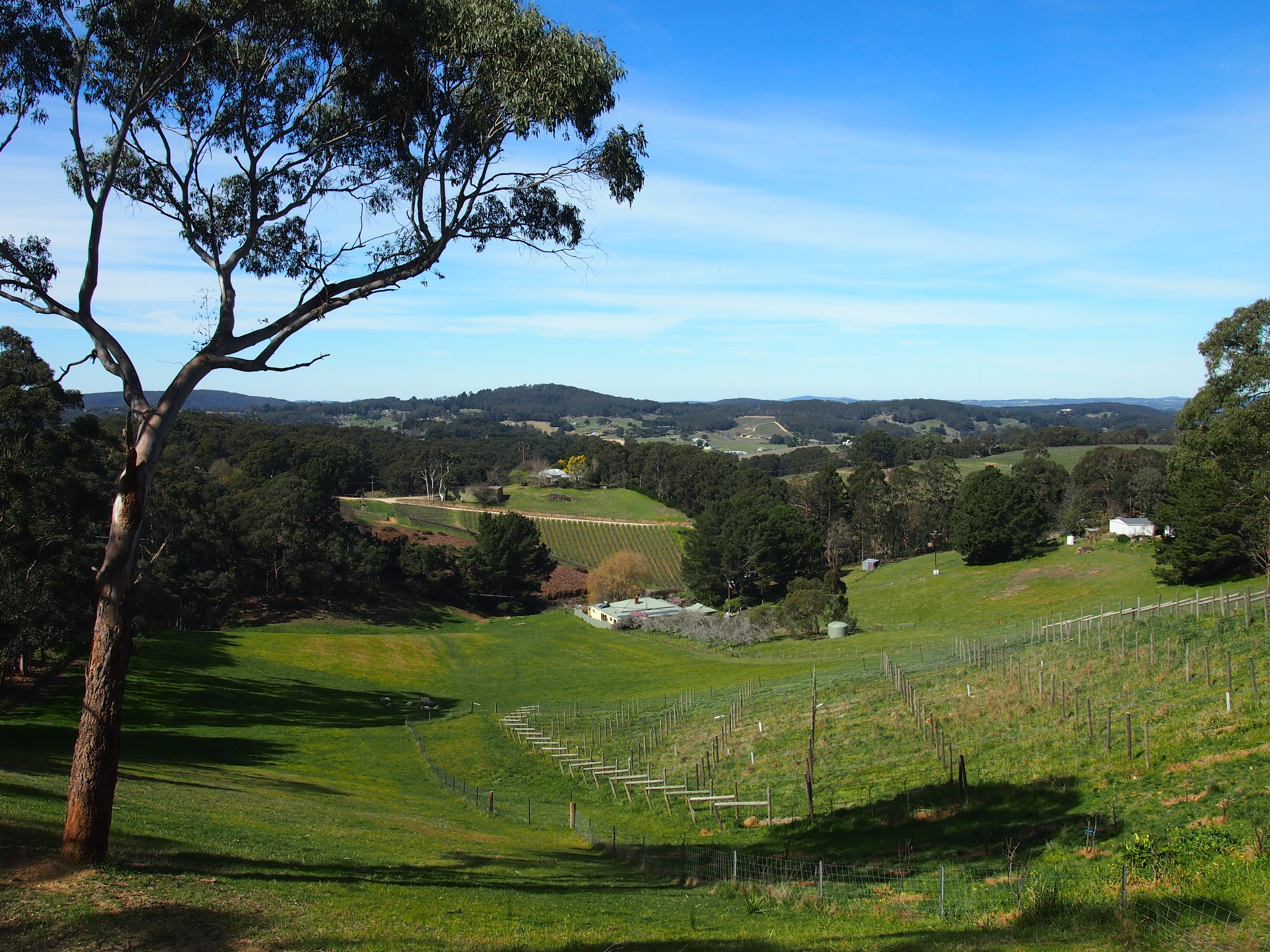
- Type: Australian Geographical Indication
- Year established: 2000.
- Country: Australia
- Part of: Adelaide Hills
- Precipitation (annual average): 1,050–1,150 mm (41–45 in)
- Total area: 24.2 square kilometres (9.3 square miles)
- Comments: 2004

Piccadilly Valley wine sub-region is a wine sub-region in South Australia located between the towns of Ashton and Basket Range in the north and the towns of Stirling, Aldgate and Bridgewater to its south in the Mount Lofty Ranges to the east of the Adelaide city centre. The sub-region received appellation as an Australian Geographical Indication (AGI) on 14 April 2000. The sub-region is part of the Adelaide Hills wine region and the Mount Lofty Ranges zone.

== See also ==
- South Australian wine

== Citations and references ==
=== References ===
- Davidson Viticultural Consulting Services (2004), Adelaide Hills Wine Region Profile (PDF), Davidson Viticultural Consulting Services, archived from the original (PDF) on 11 November 2014
- Halliday, James (23 October 2012), James Halliday Australian wine companion : the bestselling and definitive guide to Australian wine (2013 ed.), Richmond, Vic. Hardie Grant Books (published 2012), ISBN 978-1-74270-306-0
