= Bill Moularadellis =

Australian winemaker

Bill Moularadellis (born 1964) is an Australian winemaker and is the son of Greek emigrates Sarantos and Constantina Moularadellis.

Bill Moularadellis is the founder and Managing Director of Kingston Estate, which is a South Australian Riverland based winery and in 2011 was elected on to the board of Wine Australia Corporation in the capacity of Non-Executive Member.

Bill has held a number of positions in various wine industry bodies. These include President of the Riverland Winemakers Association and member of Horticulture Industry Development Board (1998–1999).

He is a past executive committee member of the South Australian Wine and Brand Industry Association (1995–2002), has previously been Chairman (2001–2002) and is the Vice Chair of the Riverland Wine Industry Development Council.

From 1997 to 2002 Bill Moularadellis was a member of the Reserve Bank of Australia Small Business Advisory Board. He has been a member of the Knowledge Development Advisory Committee.

== Awards ==
- Riverland Winemaker of the Year, 2003
- South Australian Small Business of the Year Award (under 30 employee category), 1994
- South Australian Businessman of the Year, 1997
- National Business Bulletin Business Star Export Award, 1998
- National Australia Bank Ethnic Business Award, 1998

== Winemaking ==
Bill Moularadellis graduated in oenology from Roseworthy Agricultural College in 1985 and joined the family grape growing business.

In 1986 he crushed his first vintage under the newly established Kingston Estate brand. Bill Moularadellis is currently the owner and Chief Executive Officer of Kingston Estate wines.

In 2009 Kingston Estate was the 10th largest Australian exporter of branded wine by value.

He is a keen advocate of the grape variety Petit Verdot and holds one of the largest Petit Verdot vineyards in the world.

== See also ==
- South Australian Wine
- Australian Wine
- Roseworthy College
- List of Wine Personalities
