= Adelaide Plains wine region =

Wine region in South Australia

Adelaide Plains
- Wine region
- Type: Australian Geographical Indication
- Year established: 2002
- Country: Australia
- Part of: Mount Lofty Ranges zone
- Heat units: 1270
- Precipitation (annual average): 311 mm (12.2 in)
- Size of planted vineyards: 646 ha (1,600 acres)
- Grapes produced: 4,360 tonnes (4,290 long tons; 4,810 short tons)
- Varietals produced: Shiraz, Chardonnay, Cabernet Sauvignon, Sauvignon Blanc
- No. of wineries: 11
- Comments: Data as of 2014

Adelaide Plains wine region is a wine region located in South Australia immediately north of the capital city of Adelaide. The region received appellation as an Australian Geographical Indication in 2002 and as of 2014, it is represented by 11 wineries. It is part of the Mount Lofty Ranges zone.

== Extent and appellation ==
The Adelaide Plains wine region covers an area located in the northern end of the Adelaide metropolitan area and rural land to the metropolitan area's immediate north. Its northern boundary starts at the mouth of the Light River on the coast with Gulf St Vincent and follows the river's alignment until about due east of Mallala where it follows the alignment of Wasleys Road passing through Wasleys until it meets the Horrocks Highway being the name of the section of the Main North Road located north of Gawler.

Its eastern boundary follows the alignment of the Main North Road to its intersection with the Grand Junction Road and the Princes Highway at Gepps Cross in the south passing through Roseworthy, Gawler and Elizabeth. Its southern boundary is the Grand Junction Road and the continuation of its alignment along Bower Road to the coastline. Its western boundary is the Gulf St Vincent coastline including crossing over the Port River and the Barker Inlet from Outer Harbor to St Kilda.

The Adelaide Plains wine region was registered as an Australian Geographical Indication on 25 March 2002.

== Grapes and wine ==
As of 2014, the most common plantings in the Adelaide Plains wine region within a total planted area of 646 ha (1,600 acres) was reported as being Shiraz (34.4%) followed by Chardonnay (10.2%), Cabernet Sauvignon (9.3%) and Sauvignon Blanc (8.4%). Alternatively, red wine varietals account for 64.1% of plantings while white wines varietals account for 31.3% of plantings. The 2014 vintage is reported as consisting of 3,305 tonnes (3,253 long tons; 3,643 short tons) red grapes crushed valued at A$2,523,461 and 1,055 tonnes (1,038 long tons; 1,163 short tons) white grapes crushed valued at $737,939. As of 2014, the region is reported as containing at least 11 wineries.

== See also ==
- South Australian wine

== Citations and references ==
=== References ===
- Phylloxera and Grape Industry Board of SA (PGIBSA) (2014), "Australian regional winegrape crush survey online" (PDF), South Australian Winegrape Utilisation and Pricing Surveys, Phylloxera and Grape Industry Board of SA, ISSN 1442-6048, archived from the original (PDF) on 6 November 2014
