= Mount Benson wine region =

Wine region in South Australia

Mount Benson
- Wine region
- Type: Australian Geographical Indication
- Year established: 1997
- Years of wine industry: established 1989
- Country: Australia
- Part of: Limestone Coast zone
- Climate region: ’I’
- Heat units: 1445
- Precipitation (annual average): 171 mm (6.7 in)
- Size of planted vineyards: 504 ha (1,250 acres)
- No. of vineyards: 18 (2008)
- Grapes produced: 1,255 tonnes (1,235 long tons; 1,383 short tons)
- Varietals produced: Shiraz, Cabernet Sauvignon, Sauvignon Blanc, Merlot
- Comments: climate data: 2011, production: 2008 & 2014

The Mount Benson wine region is a wine region in the south east of the Australian state of South Australia located on the continental coastline about 300 kilometres (190 miles) from the state capital of Adelaide and halfway between the towns of Kingston SE and Robe. Mount Benson is one of six wine growing regions that are located in the Limestone Coast wine zone.

== History ==
The region's first grapes were planted in the 1980s by local farmers well attuned to Mount Benson's climatic conditions. These grapes would later make way for the region's own style of delicate, cool-climate, maritime-influenced wines.

== Viticulture and climate ==
The Mount Benson vineyards are planted on gently undulating terrain ranging from five to 50 metres above sea level and attracted the interest of viticulturalists due to prevalent loam-based terra rossa soils that sit atop free-draining limestone, which formed over millions of years while the region was underwater. Shells and skeletal remains of marine animals deposited on the shallow sands of what is now the Limestone Coast, and under the ocean's weight these remains fused together to form a layer of soft limestone.

Terra rossa soil, arguably the most famous vineyard soil in Australia, is produced as the limestone weathers and the clay contained in the rocks is left behind. Where this clay sits above the water table oxidation occurs, forming rust and giving the soil is characteristic red colour.

A moderate maritime climate is ideal from a viticultural point of view. Cold and wet winters and long, cool and dry growing seasons are typical in the region. Strong winds prevailing from the south in spring and summer keep foliage dry and disease at bay. Winter frosts are moderated by the coastal location, as are summer temperature extremes. These conditions provide the foundation to an elegant and delicate style of wines.

- Map coordinates: 36.97°S, 139.72°E
- Altitude: 5-150m
- Heat Degree Days (Oct-Apr): 1443.7
- Average annual rainfall: 483.2mm
- Growing Season rainfall: 170.5mm
- Mean January maximum: 24.6 °C
- Relative humidity (Oct-Apr, 3pm): 58%
- Harvest: late February – early May

Mount Benson is home to five cellar doors, each showcasing wine varieties which express Mount Benson's coastal locality and soils.

== Grape varieties ==
Red grape varieties represent 75% of all grapes grown in the region, with the majority of Mount Benson planted to Cabernet Sauvignon, but also including substantial plantings of Shiraz, Merlot, Pinot noir, Cabernet Franc and Petit Verdot. White varieties consist of Chardonnay and Sauvignon blanc, as well as Cygne blanc, Pinot gris, Riesling, Semillon, Verdelho and Viognier.

== See also ==
- South Australian wine

== Citations and references ==
=== References ===
- Longbottom, Mardi; Maschmedt, David; Pichler, Markus (2011), Unearthing viticulture in the Limestone Coast (PDF), ISBN 978-0-646-56744-0, archived from the original (PDF) on 6 November 2014
- Phylloxera and Grape Industry Board of SA (PGIBSA) (2014), Australian regional winegrape crush survey online (PDF), Phylloxera and Grape Industry Board of SA, ISSN 1442-6048, archived from the original (PDF) on 6 November 2014
