= South Australian wine =

Wine industry in the state of South Australia

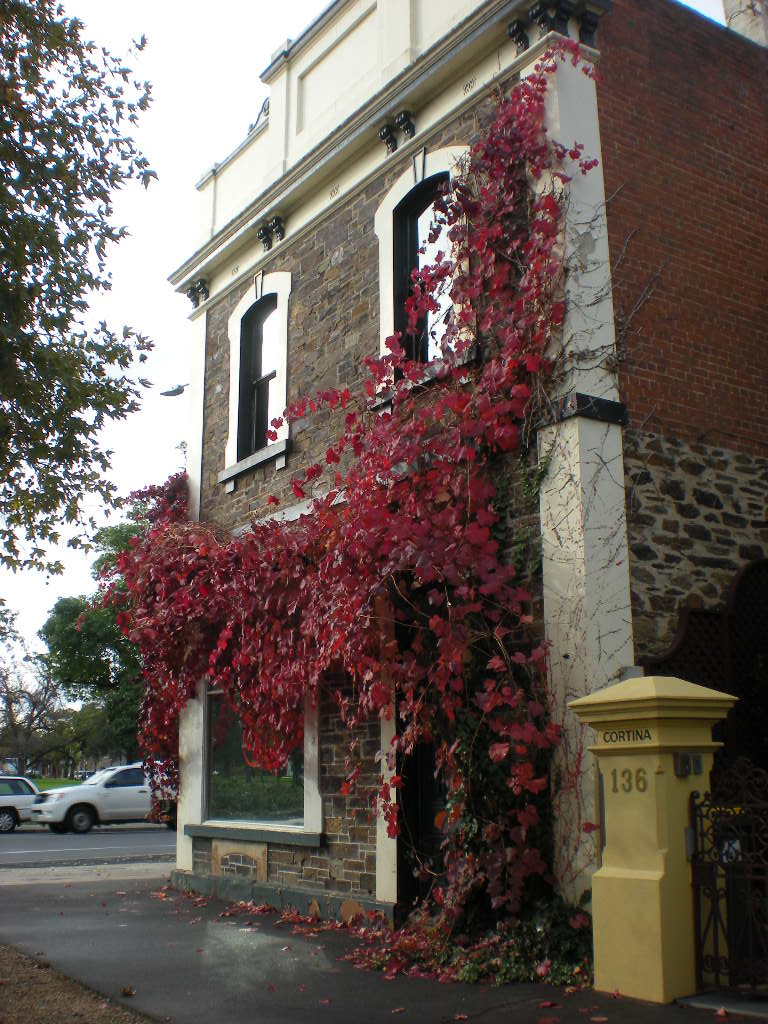
A wine shop in North Adelaide

The South Australian wine industry is responsible for more than half the production of all Australian wine. South Australia has a vast diversity in geography and climate which allows the state to be able to produce a range of grape varieties–from the cool climate Riesling variety in the Clare Valley wine region to the big, full bodied Shiraz wines of the Barossa Valley.

Some of Australia's best-known wines like Penfolds Grange, Jacob's Creek, Yalumba and Henschke Hill of Grace are produced there, as well as many of Australia's mass-produced box wines.

As with most agriculture in Australia, irrigation is vital to the success of the South Australian wine industry.

== History ==
The earliest recorded evidence of vine planting was in 1836 by a settler named John Barton Hack in Chichester Gardens, North Adelaide.

In 1838 George Stevenson planted a vineyard in Adelaide and may have been producing wine as early as 1841, while John Reynell planted a vineyard with 500 cuttings from Tasmania in 1841, and made wine in 1843. Following the spread of urban development, Hack's vines were pulled up and replanted in a new vineyard at Echunga Springs near Mount Barker. In 1843, he sent a case of wine made from the vineyard to Queen Victoria, being the first Australian wine to reach the Queen.

Dr Christopher Rawson Penfold established his medical practice at "The Grange" in Magill in 1844, planting the vine cuttings from southern France that he had brought with him when emigrating to Australia.

== Climate and geography ==
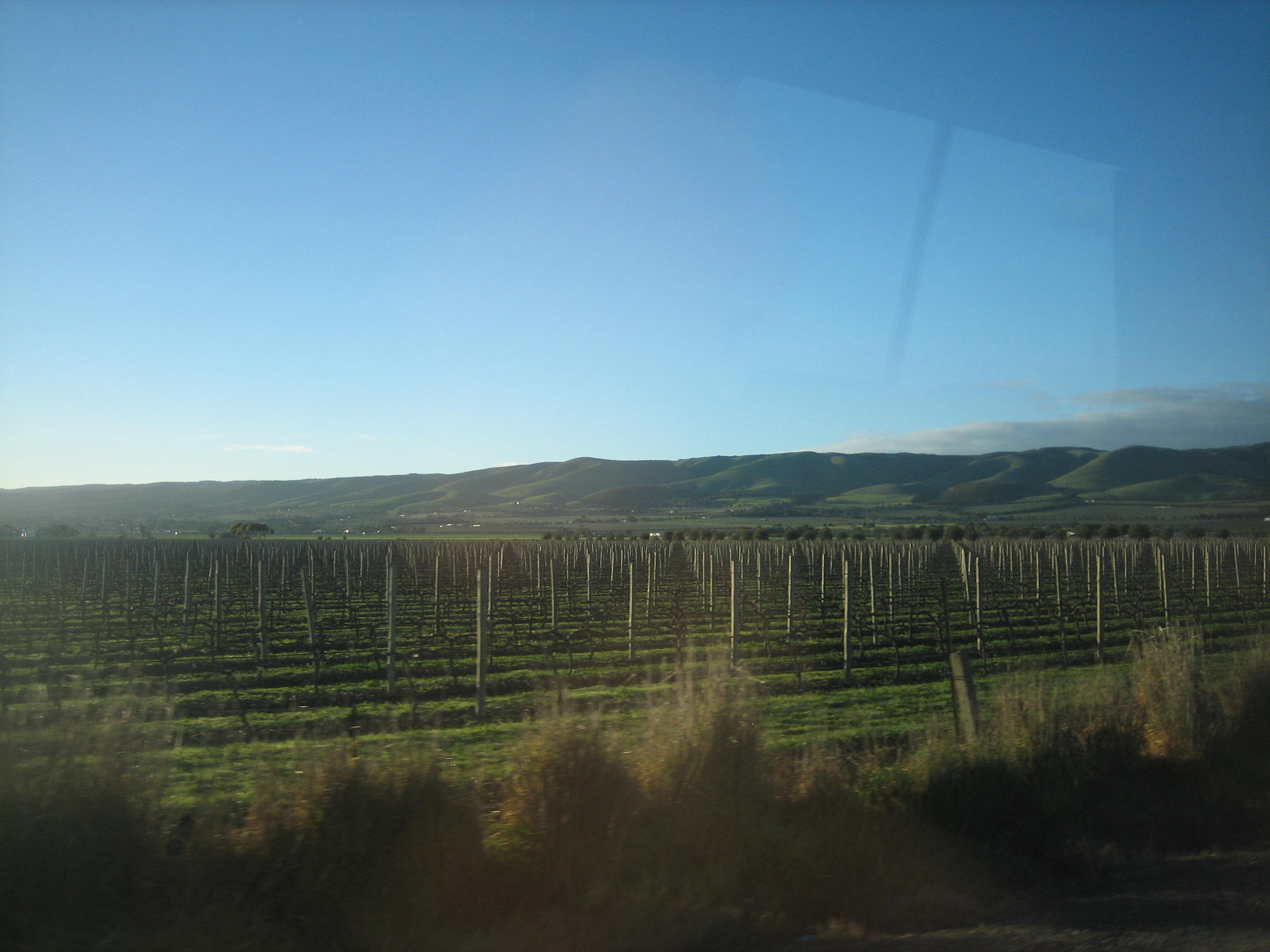
Vineyards in rural South Australia

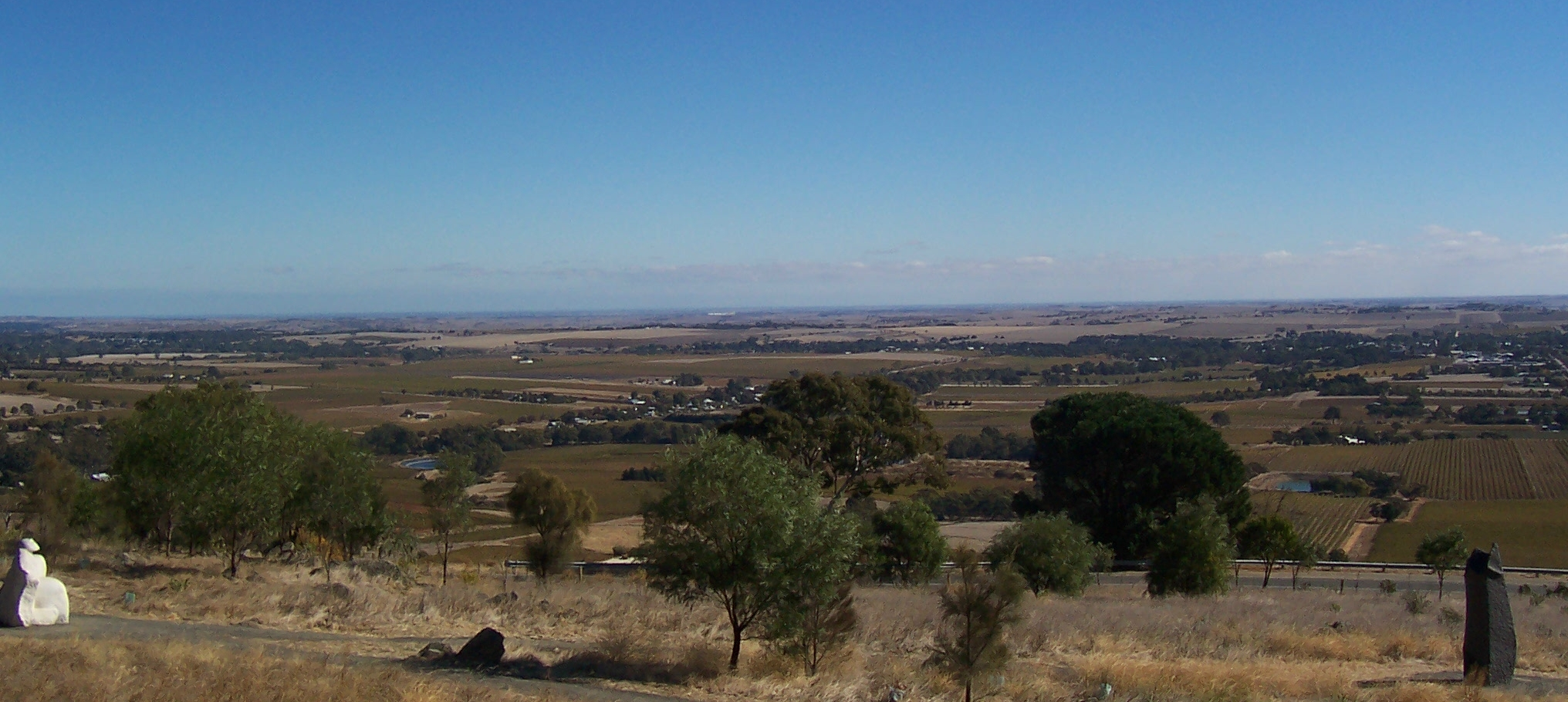
The Barossa Valley overlooking the town of Bethany

Located in south central Australia, South Australia is bordered by the four other mainland states, (Western Australia to the west, Queensland to the north east, New South Wales to the east, Victoria to the south east), the Northern Territory to the north, and the Great Australian Bight forms the state's southern coastline.

The climate of the state varies greatly, with the more interior regions like the Riverland being intensely hot, and growing cooler closer to the coastal regions like Adelaide Hills. Across the region there is low annual rainfall which necessitates irrigation to counter droughts.

Vines are grown at altitudes from the low valley regions of the Barossa and the Riverland up to 600 metres (1,970 ft) high in the vineyards at Pewsey Vale in the Eden Valley. The soil types are also varied, and include the terra rosa of the Coonawarra region, the limestone-marl based soils of the Adelaide and Riverland areas, and the sandy, clay loam based soils of the Barossa.

== Wine zones and regions ==
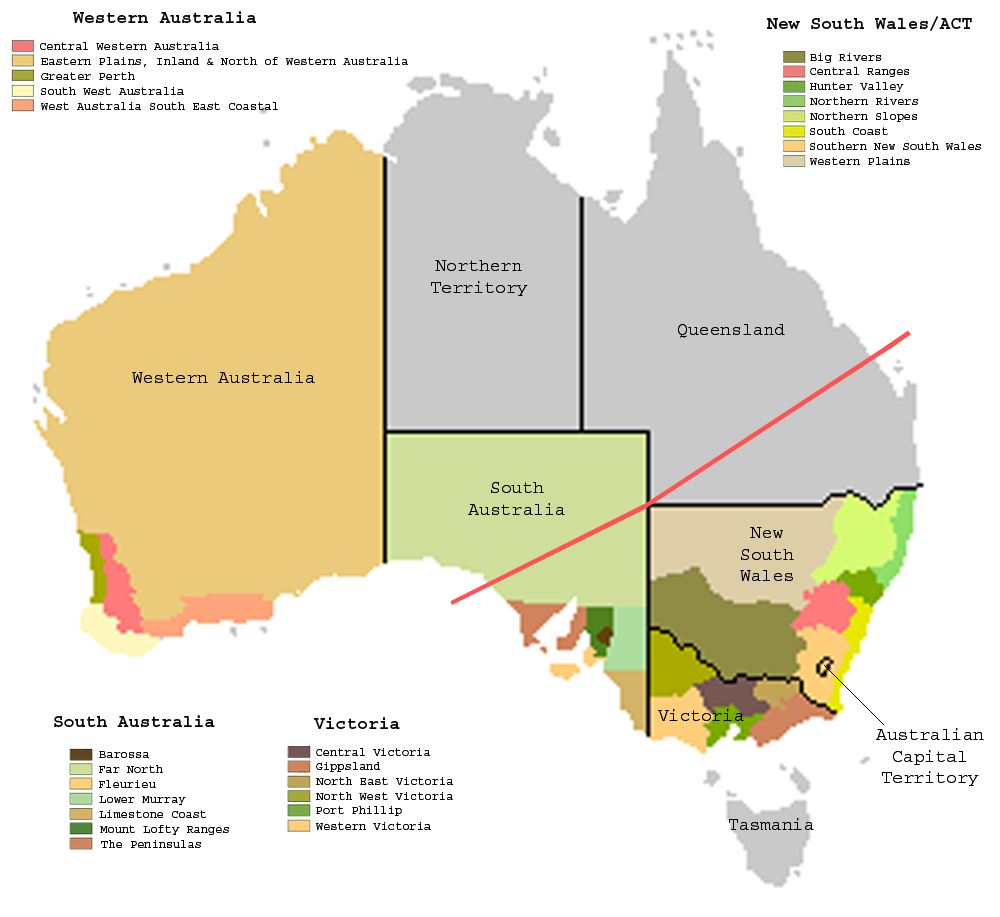
Australian wine zones & regions

Since the 1960s, Australia's labeling laws have used an appellation system known as the Australian Geographical Indication (AGI or geographical indication) which distinguishes the geographic origins of the grape. Under these laws, at least 85% of the grapes must be from the region that is designated on the label. In the late 1990s more definitive boundaries were established that divided Australia up into Geographic Indications known as zones, regions and subregions.

=== Adelaide super zone ===
In South Australia, a fourth geographical indication known as a super zone is used which consists of a group of adjoining zones. As of 2014, only one 'super zone' exists: this is the Adelaide region which consists of the Barossa, Fleurieu and Mount Lofty Ranges zones. The Adelaide super zone was registered as an AGI on 27 December 1996.

=== Barossa zone ===
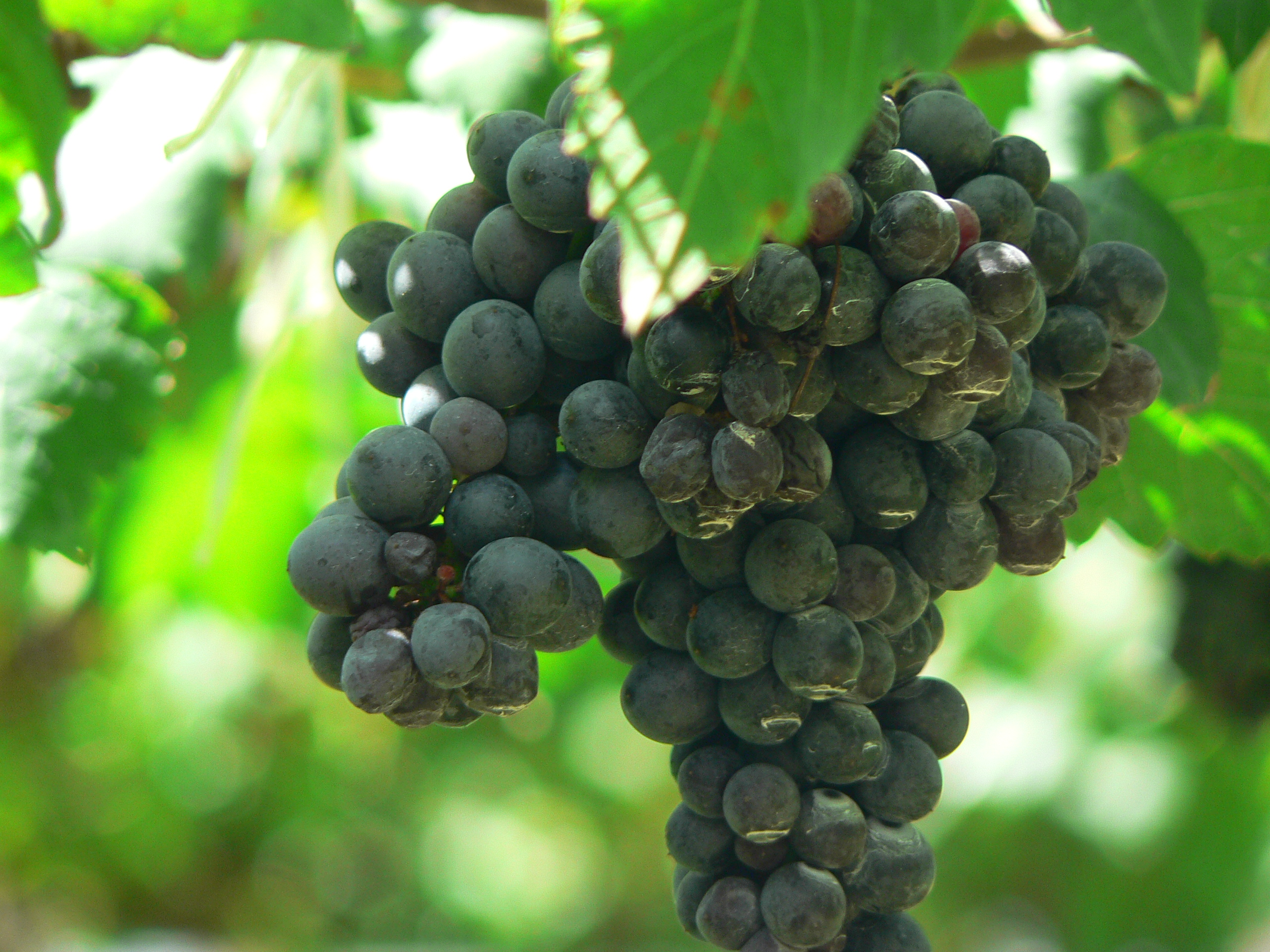
Shiraz grapes

The Barossa zone is located just outside the north-east of the Adelaide metropolitan area.

- The Barossa Valley wine region is one of Australia's oldest and most prestigious premium wine-producing regions, known for its Shiraz production. The area's climate is very hot and dry (for a wine-producing area). Most of the area's white wine plantings (Chardonnay, Riesling and Semillon) are located on the higher altitude hill sides around the valley where they can be cooled by the ocean breeze. In recent times the area has found some success with plantings of Rhône varietals including Grenache and Mourvèdre. Due to the hot climate, the grapes can become overripe, which requires the winemakers to limit the maceration time to prevent the wines from being overly tannic.
- The Eden Valley wine region includes the High Eden sub-region, and is known for its rockier, more acidic soil than the neighbouring Barossa Valley. The area has a higher elevation (in the 400–610 metres (1,300–2,000 ft) range), and thus has a colder, wetter climate. The Eden Valley is home to the Hill of Grace vineyard with its 140+ year old Shiraz vines that are behind the Henschke Hill of Grace wine. The Eden Valley has also gained international attention for its limestone noted Rieslings.

=== Fleurieu zone ===
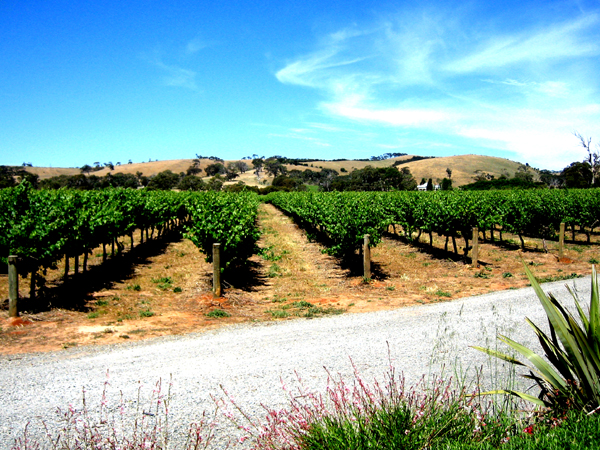
Vineyard in the McLaren Vale region

The Fleurieu zone is located south of the Adelaide metropolitan area, between the mouth of the River Murray and the Gulf St Vincent and includes Kangaroo Island.

- The Currency Creek wine region is located on the west side of Lake Alexandrina between Milang, the Murray Mouth, Port Elliot and just south of Ashbourne including the town of Currency Creek. Chardonnay, Riesling, Sauvignon blanc and Semillon grow here, though the area also produces some notable red wines.
- The Kangaroo Island wine region is located just off the coast of South Australia and is known for its Bordeaux style wines. Most of the vineyards are found on the ironstone and sandy loam soils near Kingscote.
- The Langhorne Creek wine region is located southeast of Adelaide along the Bremer River. Orlando Wines sources many of the grapes for its Jacob's Creek brand from this area which has also developed a reputation of its dessert wines.
- The McLaren Vale wine region is located south of Adelaide and extends to the south of Morphett Vale. With the area's 56 centimetres (22 in) of rain, and diversity of soil types including sand, clay and limestone, this area produces a wide range of wines with Shiraz, Cabernet Sauvignon, Merlot, Chardonnay, Semillon and Sauvignon blanc being the most widely planted.
- The Southern Fleurieu region is located on the southern end of the Fleurieu Peninsula. The area's sandy loam and gravel based ironstone soil supports Cabernet Sauvignon, Malbec, Riesling and Viognier plantings. Shiraz, Sauvignon blanc, Merlot and Primitivo are also planted at Nangkita in the centre of the Peninsula.

=== Mount Lofty Ranges zone ===
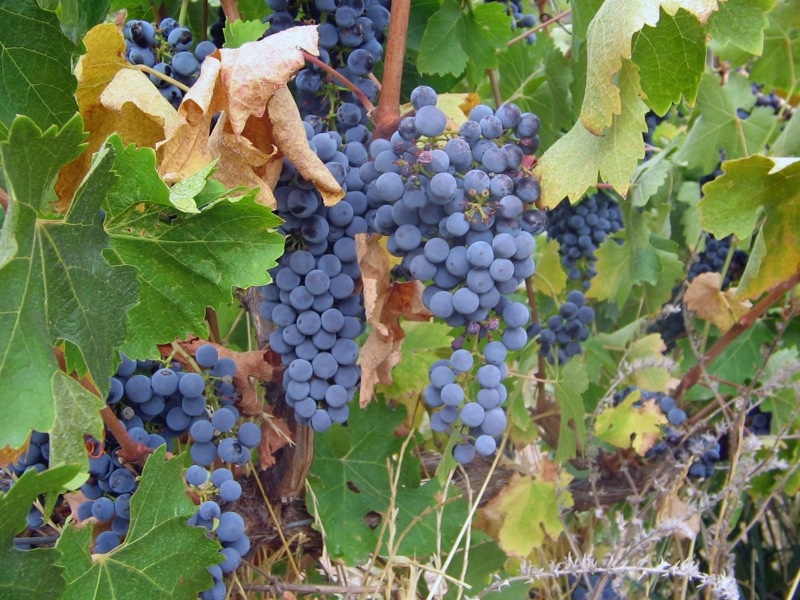
Cabernet Sauvignon from the Clare Valley

The Mount Lofty Ranges zone is located immediately to the east of Adelaide, north of the Fleurieu zone and south and north of the Barossa zone.

- The Adelaide Hills is located 14 kilometres (9 mi) from the Gulf St Vincent coast; winds from which have a tempering effect on the mediterranean climate of this region, making it one of the coolest in South Australia. The region contains two sub-regions, Lenswood and Piccadilly Valley.
- The Adelaide Plains is one of the hottest and flattest wine regions in South Australia. The area's Magill vineyards located on the edge of the foothills: "The Grange", pioneered by Christopher Rawson Penfold, and "Auldana", pioneered by W. P. Auld, once provided the grapes for the production of Penfolds' Grange. There were once a number of vineyards on the Plains to the south of the Adelaide city centre, but these areas are now covered with Adelaide's suburban sprawl.
- The Clare Valley is South Australia's most northerly major wine district. The region contains two areas considered to be sub-regions - Polish Hill River and Watervale. Despite its hot and dry climate, many of the vineyards in this area are not irrigated. This helps to reduce crop yields and to concentrate the flavours in the grape. The region is known for its ability to produce Chardonnays, Semillons, and Rieslings that range from full body and luscious to light and delicate.

=== Far North zone ===
The Far North zone is located north of the Clare Valley wine region.

- The Southern Flinders Ranges has been planted with vineyards since the 1890s, but has only recently started to gain the attention of the international wine community. Located along the Goyder's Line, the area receives an ample amount of rainfall and tends to harvest earlier than the more southerly Clare and Barossa valleys. The area is best suited for Cabernet Sauvignon, Merlot and Shiraz.

=== Limestone Coast zone ===
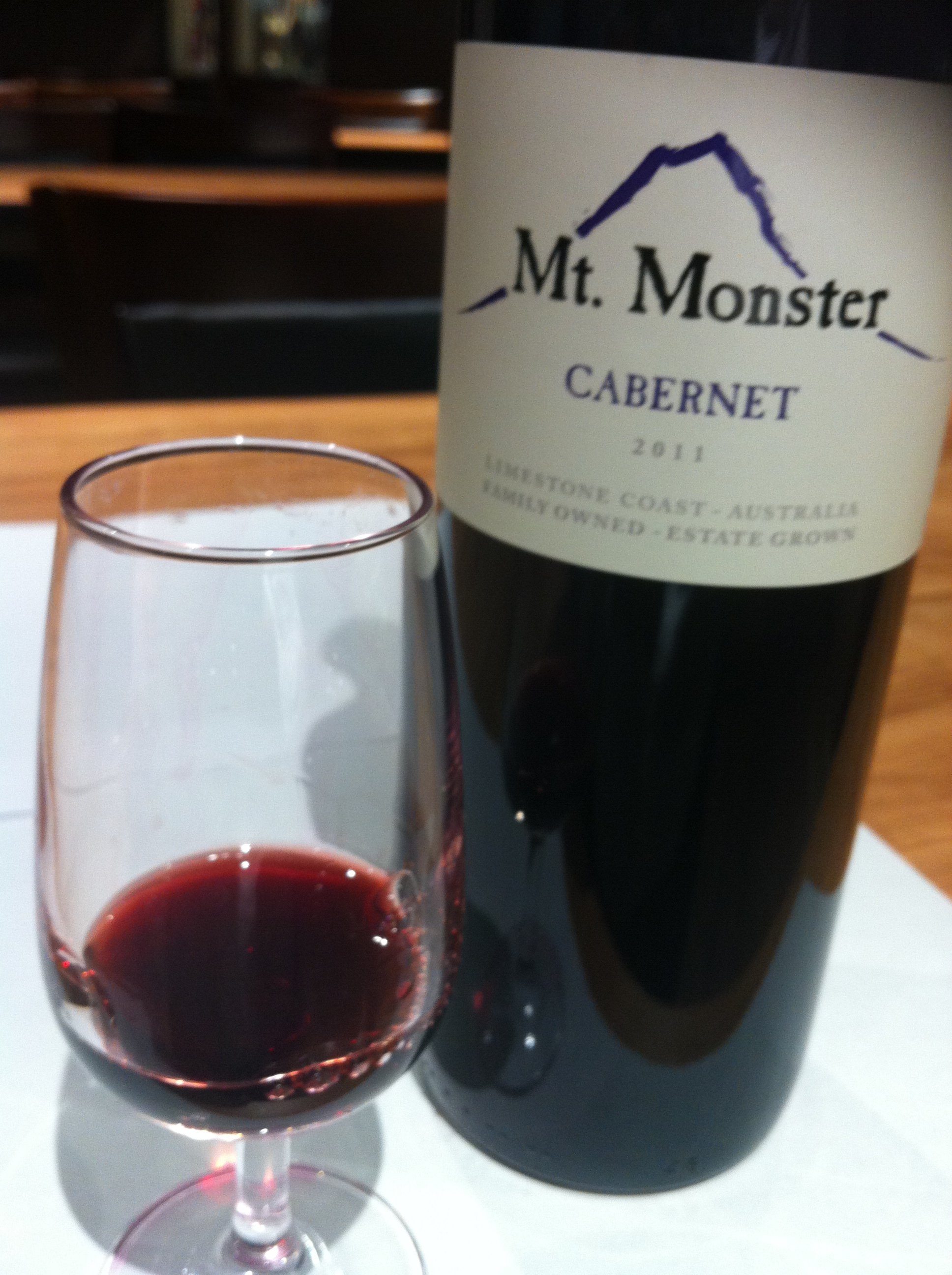
A Cabernet Sauvignon from the Limestone Coast region

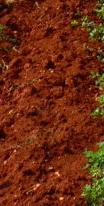
Terra rossa soil

The Limestone Coast zone is located in the south-east of the state, bounded by the continental coastline to the south, the border with the neighbouring state of Victoria to the east and the Lower Murray wine zone to the north.

- The Coonawarra covers an area centred on the strip of land adjoining both sides of the Riddoch Highway mainly north of the town of Penola and is bordered by the Wrattonbilly region in the north, by the Mount Gambier region in the south and by the Victorian border in the east. It is known for the Cabernet Sauvignon grown in its terra rossa soil. For years there were disputes within the Coonawarra region about which vineyards could rightfully be considered "Coonawarra", and which were outside the boundaries. The soil itself became the deciding factor, with the lands with red terra rossa soil being visually distinguishable from the black soil found interspersed throughout the region. In addition to Cabernet, the region has also found some success with its Chardonnay, Malbec, Merlot, Petit Verdot, Pinot noir, Riesling, Sauvignon blanc, Semillon and Shiraz.
- The Mount Benson wine region is located in the southeastern part of the state near the Robe wine region, west of Coonawarra. In the late 20th century, the area saw an influx of foreign investment, including the Rhône wine estate M. Chapoutier and the Belgium Kreglinger winery. The wines made here tend to be fruitier and less tannic than Coonawarra.
- The Mount Gambier wine region is located around the regional city of Mount Gambier. The first planting of vines occurred in 1982. The region received appellation as an Australian Geographical Indication in 2010 and as of 2014, is represented by 20 vineyards and eight wineries.
- The Padthaway wine region is a little north of, and slightly warmer than, Coonawarra, but it is better known for its white wine production, particularly Chardonnay. The wines here are known for the balance of their natural acidity and fruit.
- The Robe wine region is located near Mount Benson in the southeast part of the state, west of Coonawarra.
- The Wrattonbully wine region is located between Coonawarra and Padthaway and had its first commercial vineyards established in the area in 1968. The climate of the region is similar to Coonawarra, but vineyards in the Wrattonbully region tend to be higher elevated and on better drained soils. The soil of the area includes clay, sand and loam on top of limestone, with some patches of terra rossa. Cabernet Sauvignon and Shiraz are the most popular plantings.

=== Lower Murray zone ===
The Lower Murray zone which is located to the east of the Adelaide superzone, is bounded by the Limestone Coast zone to the south, the Far North zone to the north and by the border with Victoria to the east.

- The Riverland wine region is the highly irrigated land where a large percentage of Australia's bulk and box wines are produced, similar to the Riverina region in New South Wales. Cabernet Sauvignon, Chardonnay, Malbec and Riesling are some of the largest plantings in the area. The Riverland region also has one of the larger single plantings of Petit Verdot in the world, with Kingston Estate planting 100 hectares (250 acres) of this variety.

=== The Peninsulas zone ===
The Peninsulas zone covers the entire Yorke Peninsula, an adjoining portion of the Mid North of South Australia, the portion of Eyre Peninsula south of a line of latitude approximately in line with Crystal Brook and the islands located off the adjoining coastline. It is bounded by the Far North zone to its north by the Mount Lofty Ranges zone to its east.

=== South Eastern Australia wine region ===
The South Eastern Australia wine region covers the area south of a line running from Ceduna in western South Australia to the junction of the borders of New South Wales, Queensland and South Australia (known as Cameron Corner) and then to the intersection of the Tropic of Capricorn with the eastern continental coastline. This region was registered as an AGI on 1 May 1996.

== See also ==
- Australian wine
- List of wineries in South Australia
