= Lenswood wine sub-region =

Coordinates: 34.91822°S 138.83261°E

Lenswood sub-region
- Wine region
- Type: Australian Geographical Indication
- Year established: 1998.
- Country: Australia
- Part of: Adelaide Hills
- Heat units: 1422
- Precipitation (annual average): 1,020 mm (40 in)
- Soil conditions: ‘loamy with sub-clay soils’
- Total area: 66.6 square kilometres (25.7 square miles)
- Comments: 2004

Lenswood wine sub-region is a wine sub-region located around the town of Lenswood in South Australia within the Mount Lofty Ranges to the east of the Adelaide city centre. The sub-region received appellation as an Australian Geographical Indication (AGI) on 16 October 1998. The sub-region is part of the Adelaide Hills wine region and the Mount Lofty Ranges zone.

== See also ==
- South Australian wine

== Citations and references ==
=== References ===
- Davidson Viticultural Consulting Services (2004), Adelaide Hills Wine Region Profile (PDF), Davidson Viticultural Consulting Services, archived from the original (PDF) on 11 November 2014
- Halliday, James (23 October 2012), James Halliday Australian wine companion : the bestselling and definitive guide to Australian wine (2013 ed.), Richmond, Vic. Hardie Grant Books (published 2012), ISBN 978-1-74270-306-0
