= Mount Gambier wine region =

Wine-producing region in South Australia

Coordinates: 37.82411°S 140.77982°E

Mount Gambier
- Wine region
- Type: Australian Geographical Indication
- Year established: 2010
- Years of wine industry: Established 1982
- Country: Australia
- Part of: Limestone Coast
- Growing season: October to April
- Heat units: 1151
- Precipitation (annual average): 711 mm (28.0 in)
- Size of planted vineyards: 243 ha (600 acres)
- No. of vineyards: 20
- Varietals produced: Sauvignon Blanc, Pinot Noir, Chardonnay, Pinot Gris
- Comments: 2011

Mount Gambier wine region is a wine region located in the south east of South Australia around the regional city of Mount Gambier. The first planting of vines occurred in 1982. The region received appellation as an Australian Geographical Indication in 2010 and as of 2014, is represented by 20 vineyards and eight wineries.

== Extent and appellation ==
The Mount Gambier wine region is the southernmost region in the Limestone Coast wine zone. It covers the area around the principal regional city of Mount Gambier and is bounded to the north by the Coonawarra just north of Nangwarry, to the east by the border with Victoria and to the south by the continental coastline from the border to Carpenter Rocks in the west. The Mount Gambier wine region was registered as an Australian Geographical Indication on 21 December 2010.

== History ==
The first plantings occurred in 1982 in a vineyard established by Sandy and Helen Haig immediately south of the city of Mount Gambier. The establishment of vineyards within the wine region is attributed to primary producers diversifying away from dairy production following the corporatisation and deregulation of that industry beginning in the late 1970s. Vineyards are exclusively family businesses ‘usually associated with other agricultural pursuits such as orchards, grazing, hay production and animal husbandry.’ The vineyards planted in the 1980s focused on Chardonnay and Pinot Noir varieties while establishments in the 1990s included varieties such as Cabernet and Merlot. Between the years 2001 and 2010, the majority of the region’s vineyards were planted with a total planted area of 243 ha (600 acres) for the region as of 2011. As of 2014, there are at least 20 vineyards and eight associated wineries in operation within the region.

== Grapes and wine ==
As of 2011, the most common plantings in the Mount Gambier region are Sauvignon Blanc (38% of total area) followed by Pinot Noir (29%), Chardonnay (15%) and Pinot Gris (10%). Alternatively, white wine varieties account for 65% of plantings while red wines varieties account for 35% of plantings.

== See also ==
- South Australian wine

== Citations and references ==
=== References ===
- Halliday, James (23 October 2012), James Halliday Australian wine companion : the bestselling and definitive guide to Australian wine (2013 ed.), Richmond, Vic. Hardie Grant Books (published 2012), ISBN 978-1-74270-306-0
- Longbottom, Mardi; Maschmedt, David; Pichler, Markus (2011), Unearthing viticulture in the Limestone Coast (PDF), ISBN 978-0-646-56744-0, archived from the original (PDF) on 6 November 2014
