= Riddoch Highway =

Highway in South Australia

Riddoch Highway South Australia
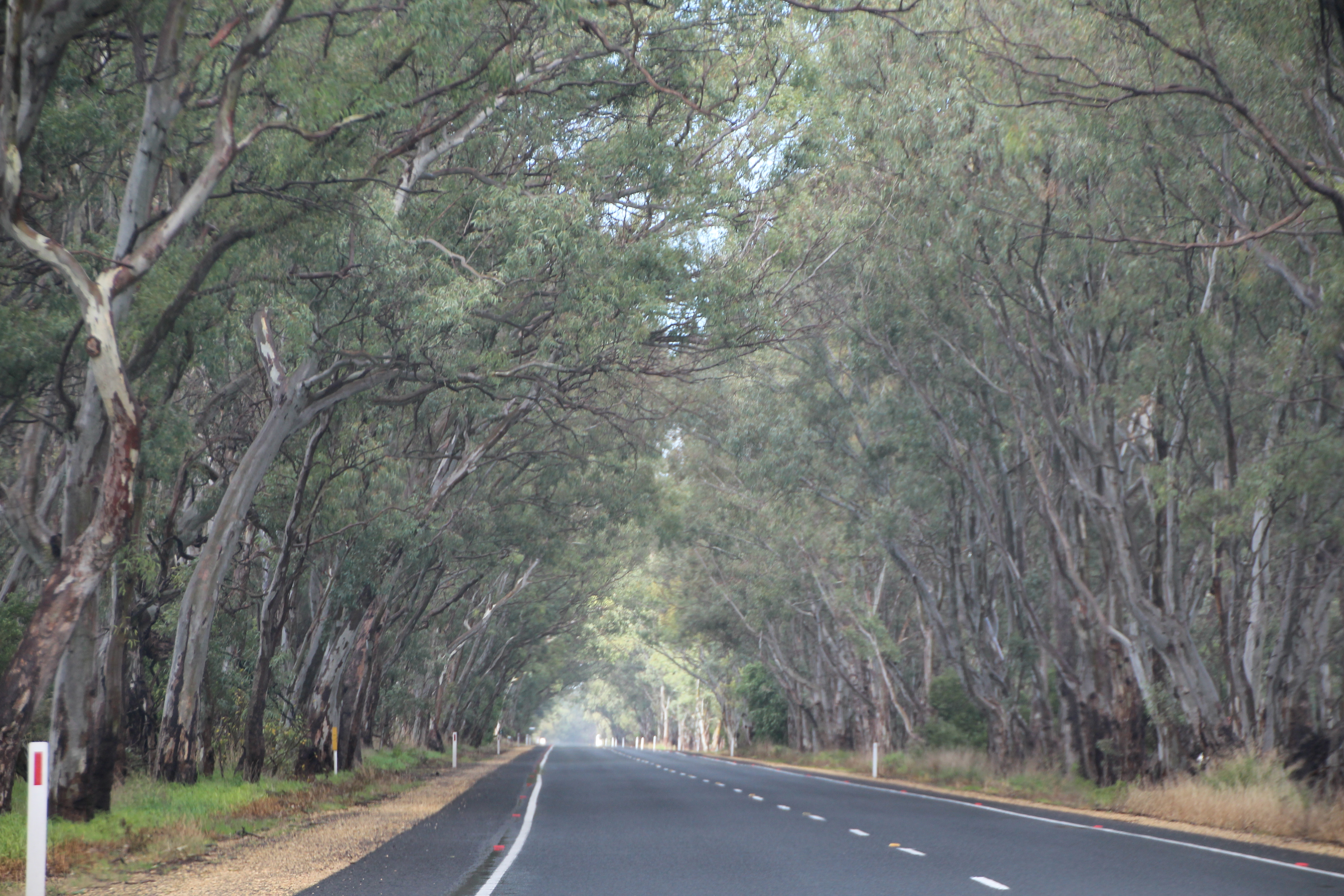
- The Riddoch Highway near Padthaway
- Coordinates: 36.085721°S 140.342395°E (North end); 38.053398°S 140.702383°E (South end)

General information
- Type: Highway
- Length: 239 km (149 mi)
- Route number(s): A66 (1998–present) (Keith–Mount Gambier); B66 (1998–present) (Mount Gambier–Port MacDonnell)

Major junctions
- North end: Dukes Highway; Keith, South Australia
- Bordertown–Naracoorte Road; Wimmera Highway; Edenhope-Penola Road; Princes Highway
- South end: Sea Parade; Port MacDonnell, South Australia

Location(s)
- Region: Limestone Coast
- Major settlements: Padthaway, Naracoorte, Coonawarra, Penola, Tarpeena, Mount Gambier

Highway system
- Highways in Australia; National Highway • Freeways in Australia; Highways in South Australia

Riddoch Highway is a rural highway in south-eastern South Australia, designated as route A66 between Keith and Mount Gambier, with the remainder between Mount Gambier and Port MacDonnell designated as route B66. It is named after John Riddoch, the first white settler landholder and vigneron in Coonawarra.

== Route ==
The Riddoch Highway branches from the Dukes Highway at Keith and travels south through Padthaway, Naracoorte, Penola, Nangwarry, Tarpeena, and Mount Gambier to Port MacDonnell and nearby Cape Northumberland.It passes through grazing and cereal-growing land, horticultural and vineyards (within the following wine regions – Padthaway, Wrattonbully, Coonawarra and Mount Gambier), and plantation timber, predominantly pinus radiata.

== Safety ==
The Royal Automobile Association of South Australia has rated the highway at 5/10.

== Major intersections ==
LGA	Location	km	mi	Destinations	Notes
Tatiara	Keith	0.0	0.0	Dukes Highway (A8) – Adelaide, Tailem Bend, Bordertown, Melbourne	Northern terminus of highway and route A66
Naracoorte Lucindale	The Gap	83.5	51.9	Bordertown–Naracoorte Road (B57) – Bordertown	
Naracoorte Lucindale	Naracoorte	109	68	Wimmera Highway (C240) – Hynam, Edenhope, Horsham, Marong	Continues into VIC as route B240 along Wimmera Highway eventually to Marong
Wattle Range	Glenroy	141	88	Edenhope Road (C212) – Edenhope	Continues into VIC as route C212 along Edenhope-Penola Road eventually to Edenhope
Wattle Range	Penola	159	99	Casterton Road (C198) – Casterton	Continues into VIC as route C198 along Casterton-Penola Road eventually to Casterton
Mount Gambier	Mount Gambier	210	130	Princes Highway (A1 east, B1 west) – Millicent, Kingston SE, Portland	Route transition: A66 north, B66 south
Grant	Port MacDonnell	238	148	Sea Parade – Cape Northumberland	Southern terminus of highway and route B66
Route transition

== See also ==
- Highways in Australia
- List of highways in South Australia
