= Padthaway wine region =

Wine-growing region in South Australia

Coordinates: 36.6023°S 140.49196°E

Padthaway
- Wine region
- Type: Australian Geographical Indication
- Year established: 1999
- Years of wine industry: established 1964
- Country: Australia
- Part of: Limestone Coast zone
- Climate region: 'I'
- Heat units: 1513
- Precipitation (annual average): 195 mm (7.7 in)
- Total area: 345 square kilometres (133 square miles)
- Size of planted vineyards: 4,052 ha (10,010 acres)
- No. of vineyards: 31 (2008)
- Grapes produced: 27,685 tonnes (27,248 long tons; 30,517 short tons)
- Varietals produced: Shiraz, Chardonnay, Cabernet Sauvignon, Riesling
- No. of wineries: 8 (2014)
- Comments: climate data: 2011, production: 2014

Padthaway wine region is a wine zone region located in the south-east of South Australia, immediately adjoining a section of the Riddoch Highway including the town of Padthaway. The region received appellation as an Australian Geographical Indication (AGI) in 1999.

== Extent and appellation ==
The Padthaway wine region extends from Naracoorte in a north westerly direction along the Riddoch Highway passing through Padthaway for a distance of about 62 kilometres (39 miles) and ceasing when the Riddoch Highway turns north towards Bordertown. The term ‘Padthaway’ was registered as an AGI on 29 November 1999.

== Grapes and wine ==
As of 2014, the most common plantings in the Padthaway wine region within a total planted area of 4,052 ha (10,010 acres) was reported as being Shiraz (30.2%) followed by Chardonnay (24.4%), Cabernet Sauvignon (22.1%) and Riesling (4.7%). Alternatively, red wine varietals account for 62.4%of plantings while white wines varietals account for 37.6%of plantings. The total 2014 vintage is reported as consisting of 14,928 tonnes (14,692 long tons; 16,455 short tons) of crushed red grapes valued at A$12,413,533 and 12,757 tonnes (12,556 long tons; 14,062 short tons) of crushed white grapes valued at A$8,310,841. As of 2014, the region is reported as having eight wineries and as of 2008, it had 31 growers.

== See also ==
- South Australian wine

== Citations and references ==
=== References ===
- Longbottom, Mardi; Maschmedt, David; Pichler, Markus (2011), Unearthing viticulture in the Limestone Coast (PDF), ISBN 978-0-646-56744-0, archived from the original (PDF) on 6 November 2014
- Phylloxera and Grape Industry Board of SA (PGIBSA) (2014), "Australian regional winegrape crush survey online" (PDF), South Australian Winegrape Utilisation and Pricing Surveys, Phylloxera and Grape Industry Board of SA, ISSN 1442-6048, archived from the original (PDF) on 6 November 2014
