= Terra rossa (soil) =

Soil typical of the Mediterranean region

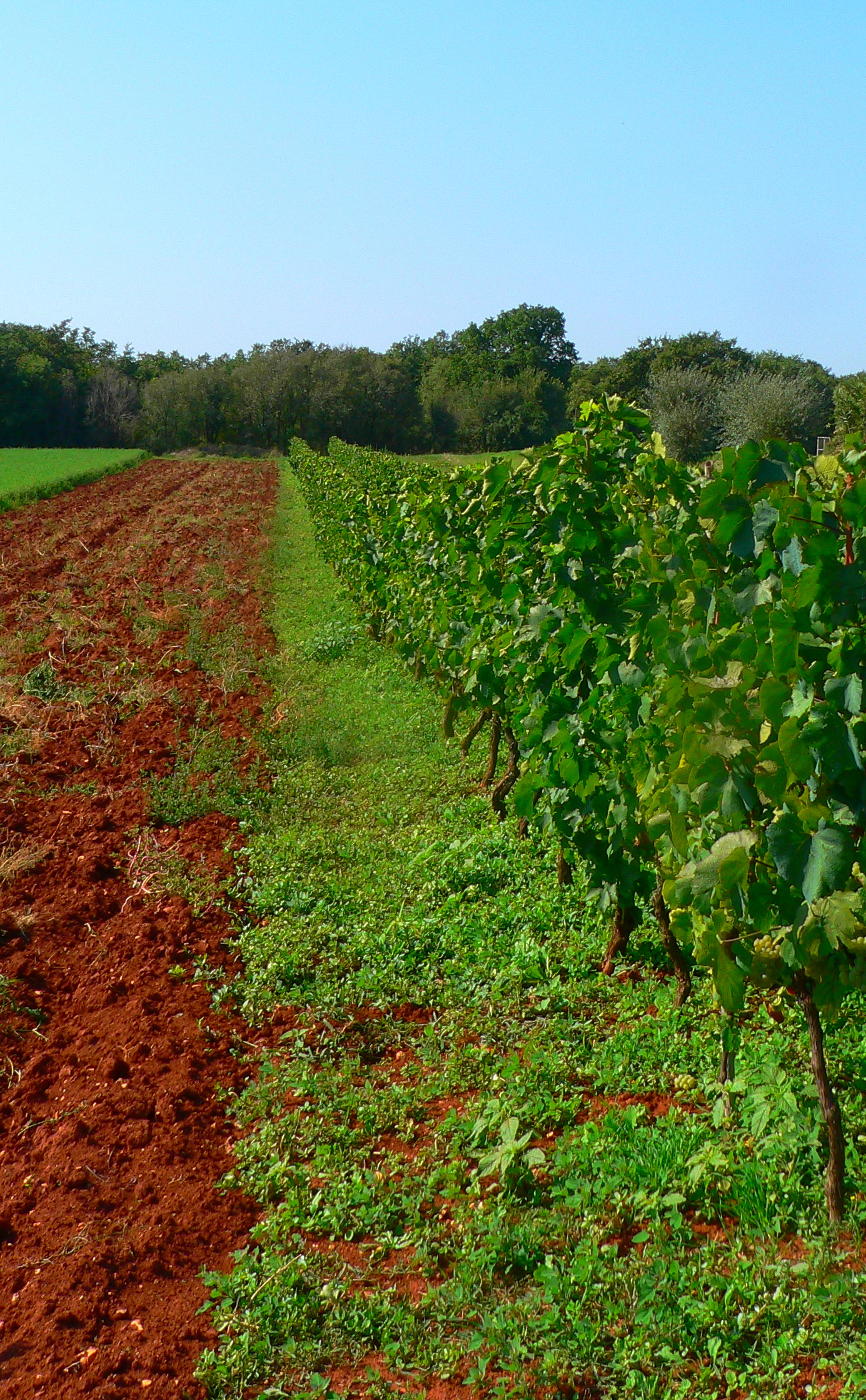
Malvasia vines in terra rossa soil

Terra rossa (Italian for 'red soil') is a well-drained, reddish, clayey to silty soil with neutral pH conditions and is typical of the Mediterranean region. The reddish color of terra rossa is the result of the preferential formation of hematite over goethite. This soil type typically occurs as a discontinuous layer that ranges from a few centimeters to several meters in thickness that covers limestone and dolomite bedrock in karst regions. The high internal drainage and neutral pH conditions of terra rossa are a result of the karstic nature of the underlying limestone and dolomite. Terra rossa is also found associated with Mediterranean climates and karst elsewhere in the world.

Compared to most clay rich soils, terra rossa has surprisingly good drainage characteristics. This makes it a popular soil type for wine production. Among other wine regions, it is found in La Mancha in Spain and the Coonawarra, Fleurieu, Wrattonbully and Barossa Valley growing areas in Australia.

== Origin of terra rossa ==
The origin of terra rossa, its parent material, and its relationship to underlying limestones and dolomites has been greatly debated over recent decades by geologists, geomorphologists, and soil scientists. One group of scientists argue that terra rossa likely developed from dissolution of the underlying carbonate rocks and the concentration of insoluble sediment and chert within it as the parent material of terra rossa. Another group of scientists argues that terra rossa cannot have been formed exclusively from the insoluble residue of underlying limestone and dolomite. Instead they propose that terra rossa is polygenetic in origin and that, depending on their geographic location, their parent material, which has been altered by pedogenesis, contains exotic sediments from volcanic ash; non-limestone and non-dolomite; and aeolian sources. A final group of scientists argues that terra rossa was formed by metasomatic replacement processes.

== Red Mediterranean ==
In pedology, red Mediterranean soil, also known as terra rossa (Italian for "red soil") is a soil classification that has been formally superseded by the formal classifications of systems such as the FAO soil classification, but that is still in common use. The terra rossa classification was still, as of 1997, a part of the national soil classifications of countries such as Israel and Italy. The UNESCO/FAO World map equivalents are the chromic luvisols (a sub-order of the luvisols), and the USDA soil taxonomy equivalent is the rhodustalfs (a sub-order of the ustalfs).

The classification denotes red-coloured soils (sometimes called "red rendzinas") which develop in or on the karstic landscape of the limestones of the Miocene and earlier periods, as well as calcretes in regions where the modern Mediterranean climate is predominant. The most accelerated development of red Mediterranean soils occurred from the Miocene to the Late Pleistocene, due to the large amount of climate fluctuation in those periods.
