= Mount Lofty Ranges zone (wine) =

Wine zone in South Australia

- Wine region
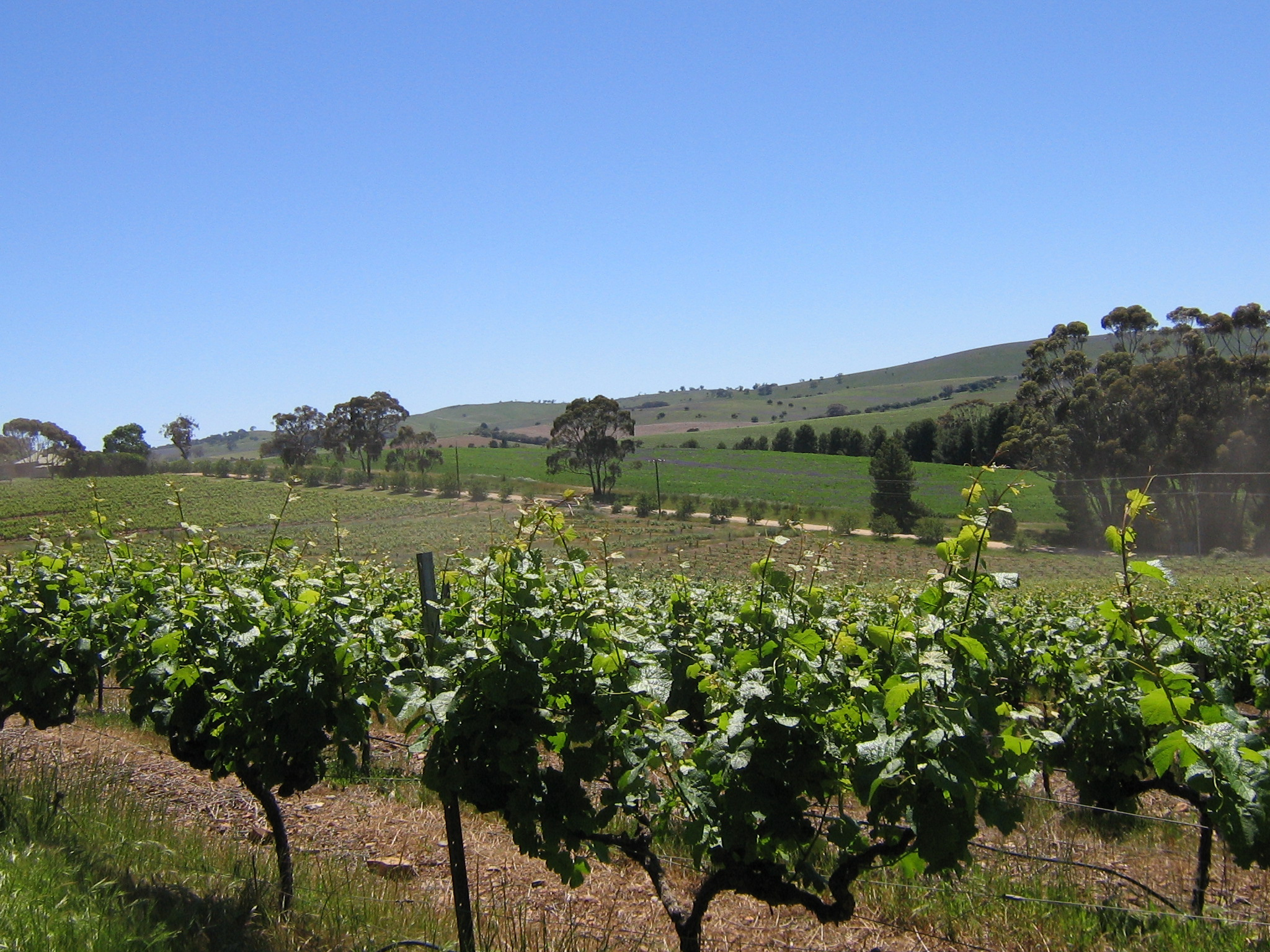
- Vineyards in Clare Valley
- Type: Australian Geographical Indication
- Year established: 1996.
- Country: Australia
- Part of: Adelaide super zone
- Sub-regions: Adelaide Hills, Adelaide Plains, Clare Valley

Mount Lofty Ranges zone is a wine zone located in South Australia west of the Murray River that occupies the Adelaide metropolitan area north of Glenelg, extending as far north as Crystal Brook, and as far south as Mount Compass in the Mount Lofty Ranges. The zone which encloses the Barossa zone on three sides, includes three wine regions that have received appellation as Australian Geographical Indications (AGIs): Adelaide Hills, Adelaide Plains and Clare Valley. The zone received AGI in 1996.

== Extent and appellation ==
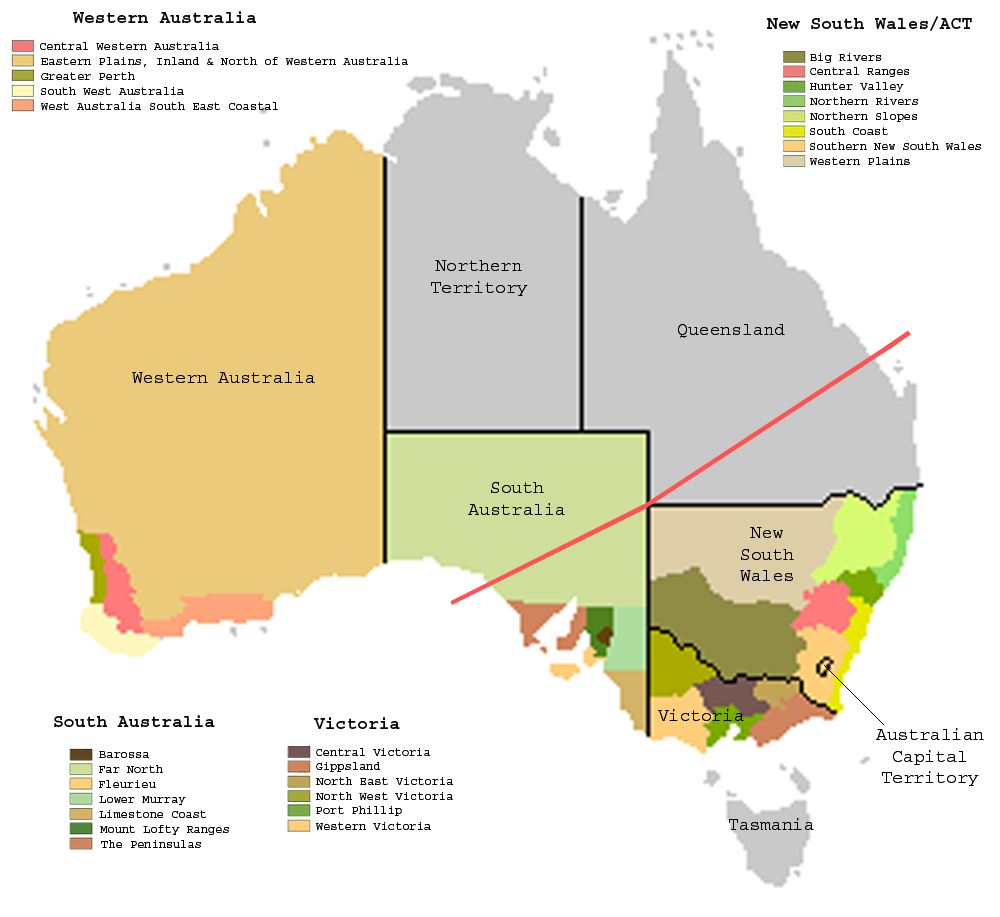
Australian wine zones & regions

The Mount Lofty Ranges zone covers an area of central South Australia bounded at the north by a line of latitude approximately in line with Crystal Brook, to the west by the Gulf St Vincent coastline and a line extending north from Port Wakefield, to the south by the line of latitude passing through Glenelg in the Adelaide metropolitan area and the portion of the Mount Lofty Ranges extending as far south as Mount Compass and bounded to the east by a line immediately west of the alignment of Murray River. The zone encloses the Barossa zone on all but its east side. The term "Mount Lofty Ranges" was registered as an AGI under the Wine Australia Corporation Act 1980 on 27 December 1996.

== Constituent regions ==
The wine zone includes the Adelaide Hills, Adelaide Plains and Clare Valley wine regions as well as vineyards not in any region.

=== Adelaide Hills wine region ===
The Adelaide Hills wine region covers an area on the Mount Lofty Ranges extending from near Mount Pleasant in the north to Mount Compass, South Australia in the south. The region is bordered by the Barossa zone in the north and by the Fleurieu zone at its southern limits. The term ‘Adelaide Hills’ was registered as an AGI on 9 February 1998.

=== Adelaide Plains wine region ===
The Adelaide Plains wine region is located immediately north of the capital city of Adelaide. The region received appellation as an Australian Geographical Indication in 2002 and as of 2014, it is represented by 11 wineries.

=== Clare Valley wine region ===
The Clare Valley wine region covers an area extending from north of the town of Clare at the region’s northern limit to the south of Auburn at its southern limit. The region received appellation as an Australian Geographical Indication on 25 March 1999.

== See also ==
- South Australian wine
