= Adelaide Hills wine region =

Wine region in South Australia

Adelaide Hills
- Wine region
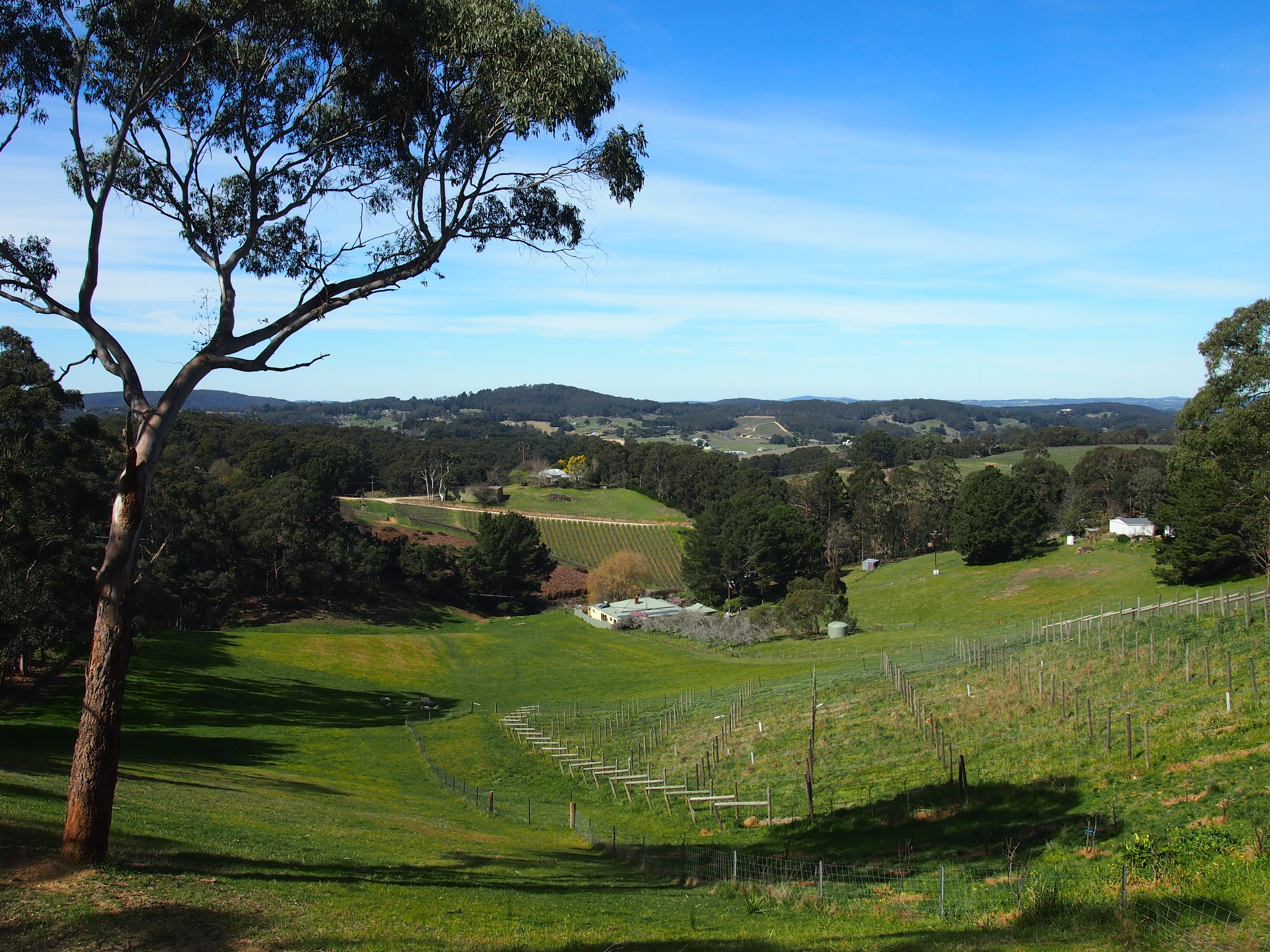
- Piccadilly Valley, south of the Mount Lofty Ranges in the Adelaide Hills
- Type: Australian geographical indication (AGI)
- Year established: 1998
- Years of wine industry: Since 1830s
- Country: Australia
- Part of: Mount Lofty Ranges zone
- Sub-regions: Lenswood, Piccadilly Valley
- Climate region: 'II'
- Heat units: 1150 to 1479
- Precipitation (annual average): 203–426 mm (8.0–16.8 in)
- Size of planted vineyards: 17,873 ha (44,170 acres)
- Grapes produced: 17,873 t (17,591 long tons; 19,702 short tons)
- Varietals produced: Sauvignon Blanc, Chardonnay, Pinot Noir, Pinot Gris
- Comments: climate data - 2004, production - 2014

Adelaide Hills is an Australian geographical indication for wine made from grapes grown in a specific area of the Adelaide Hills east of Adelaide in South Australia.

== Extent and appellation ==
The Adelaide Hills wine region covers an area extending along the Mount Lofty Ranges from near Mount Pleasant in the north to Mount Compass at its southern extent. The term 'Adelaide Hills' was registered as an AGI on 9 February 1998.

== Grapes and wine ==
As of 2014, the most common plantings in the Adelaide Hills wine region within a total planted area of 17,873 ha (44,170 acres) was reported as being Sauvignon Blanc (36.5%) followed by Chardonnay (19.3%), Pinot Noir (14%) and Pinot Gris (5.8%). Alternatively, red wine varietals account for 32.7% of plantings while white wines varietals account for 67.3% of plantings.

The 2014 vintage is reported as consisting of 5,836 tonnes (5,744 long tons; 6,433 short tons) red grapes crushed valued at A$8,196,142 and 12,037 tonnes (11,847 long tons; 13,269 short tons) white grapes crushed valued at $14,777,631.

== See also ==
- Lenswood wine sub-region
- Piccadilly Valley wine sub-region
- Wine in Australia
- South Australian food and drink
- Economy of South Australia

== Citations and references ==
=== References ===
- Davidson Viticultural Consulting Services (2004), Adelaide Hills Wine Region Profile (PDF), Davidson Viticultural Consulting Services, archived from the original (PDF) on 11 November 2014
- Halliday, James (23 October 2012), James Halliday Australian wine companion : the bestselling and definitive guide to Australian wine (2013 ed.), Richmond, Vic. Hardie Grant Books (published 2012), ISBN 978-1-74270-306-0
- Phylloxera and Grape Industry Board of SA (PGIBSA) (2014), Australian regional winegrape crush survey online (PDF), Phylloxera and Grape Industry Board of SA, ISSN 1442-6048, archived from the original (PDF) on 6 November 2014
