= Coonawarra wine region =

Wine region in South Australia

Coordinates: 37°17′24″S 140°50′17″E

Coonawarra
- Wine region
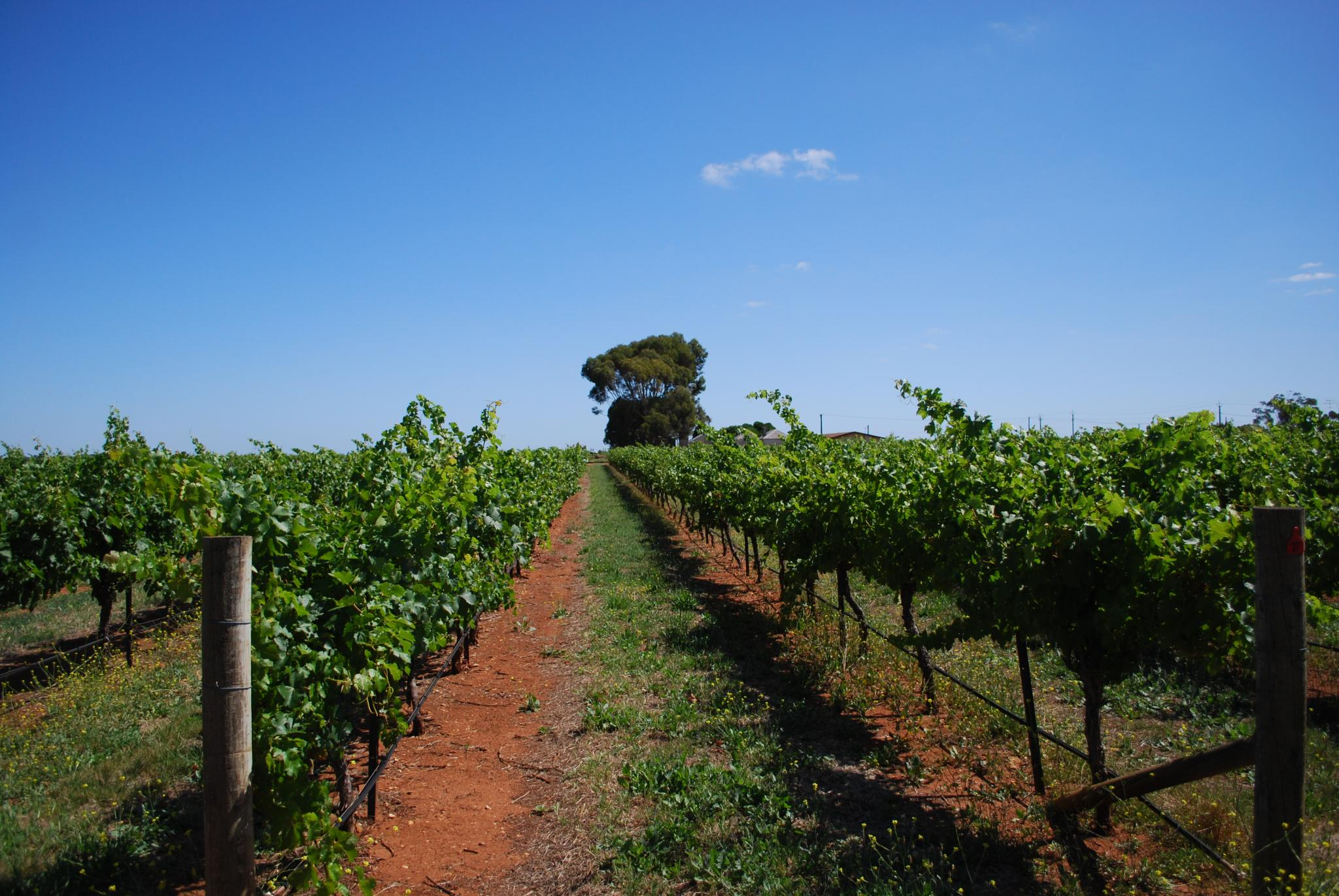
- Type: Australian Geographical Indication
- Year established: 2003
- Years of wine industry: established 1890
- Country: Australia
- Part of: Limestone Coast zone
- Growing season: October – April
- Climate region: ’I’
- Heat units: 1392
- Precipitation (annual average): 230 mm (9.1 in)
- Size of planted vineyards: 5,603 hectares (13,850 acres)
- No. of vineyards: 130 (2011)
- Grapes produced: 23,480 tonnes (23,110 long tons; 25,880 short tons)
- Varietals produced: Cabernet Sauvignon, Shiraz, Merlot, Chardonnay
- No. of wineries: 28
- Comments: climate data – 2011, production -2012 & 2014

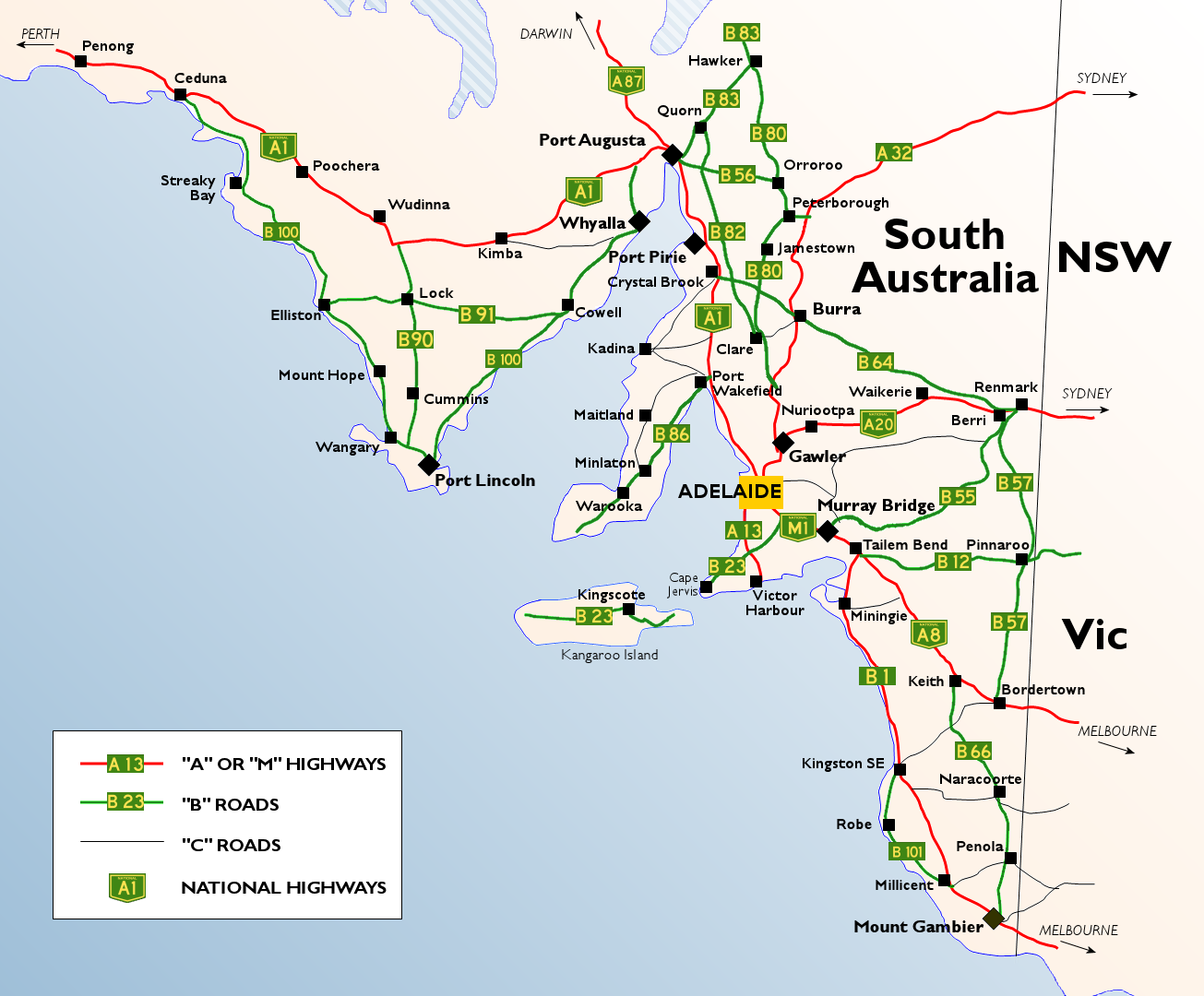
Map of South Australia. The Coonawarra region just north of Penola.

The Coonawarra wine region is a wine region centred on the town of Coonawarra in the Limestone Coast zone of South Australia. It is known for the Cabernet Sauvignon wines produced on its "terra rossa" soil. The name has been said to have originated in Bindjali, an Aboriginal language, meaning "wild honeysuckle". It is about 380 kilometres (240 mi) south-east of Adelaide, close to the border with Victoria.

== History ==
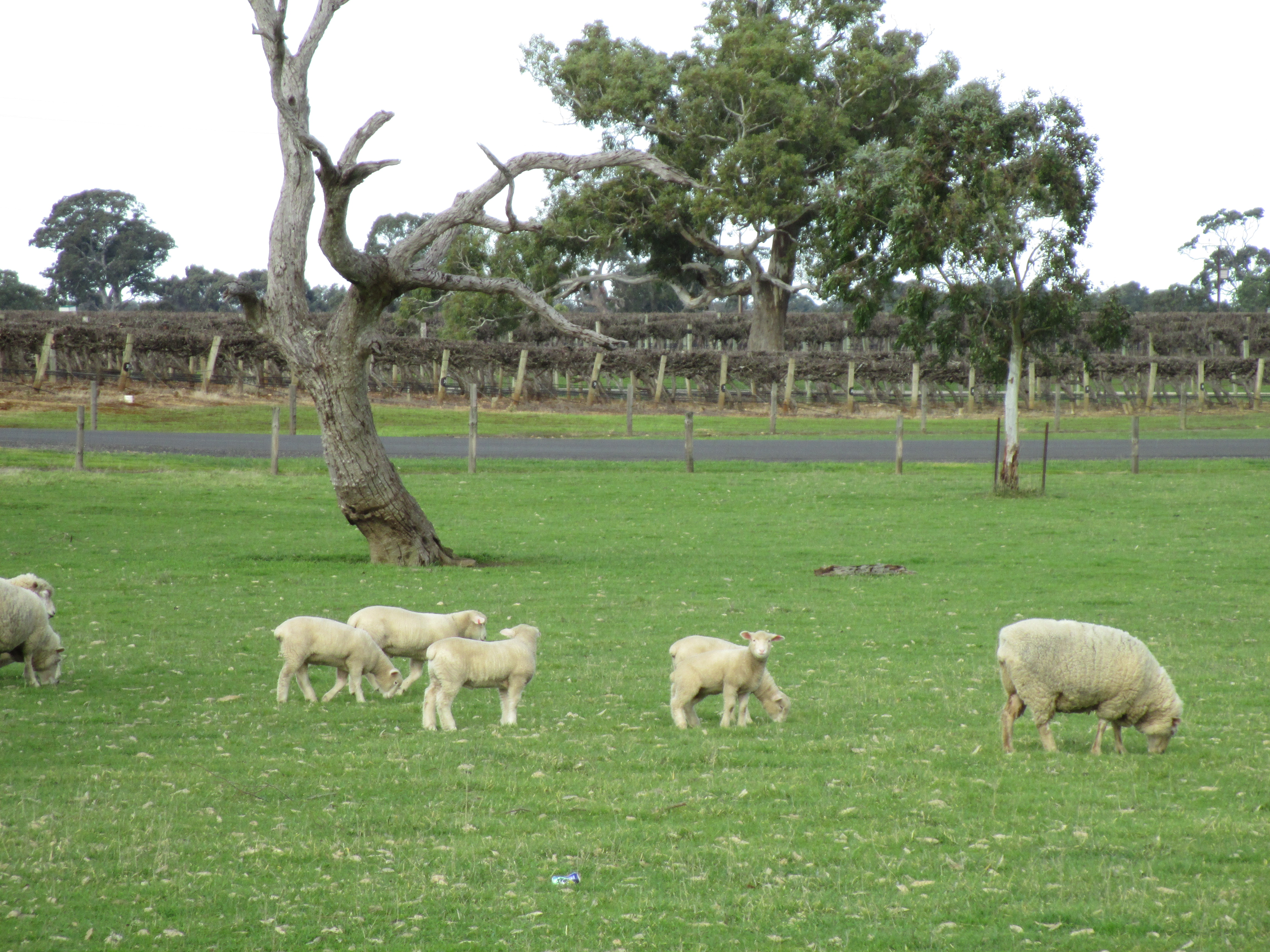

The Aboriginal Australians living in the area when Europeans arrived were the Bindjali people, The word coonawarra is reported to have been their word for honeysuckle, although this meaning has also been ascribed to Penola by the same source.

The first vines were planted by John Riddoch at Yallum, South Australia in 1890. Only the Redman family of Rouge Homme continued to produce table wine during this period, during which Shiraz was the main grape variety grown.

Fortunes changed when Samuel Wynn recognised the potential of the strip of terra rossa soil, and bought the original Riddoch cellars in 1951. Led by Wynns and Penfolds, Coonawarra was to play a leading role in the transformation of the Australian wine industry as it changed from making fortified wines to conventional table wines.

== Geology ==
Coonawarra's terra rossa soil is one of the notable terroirs of the New World, covering an area of just 15 km x 2 km north of Penola. It lies on a shallow limestone ridge, raising it above the swampy land either side – it is no coincidence that the Riddoch Highway follows this ridge as carters sought the firmest ground in times past. This special bright red soil is clearly visible on an aerial photo.

To the west of the ridge lies black rendzina soil which is poorly drained, and so is much less favourable for vines. There is also a 'transitional', or brown rendzina, soil which grows vines quite successfully. This geological complexity led to many disputes during an eight-year period before Coonawarra was entered on the Register of Protected Names. At least one vineyard (belonging to Penola High School) has the boundary pass through the middle.

== Climate ==
Being just 60 km from the sea, Coonawarra has a somewhat maritime climate not dissimilar to Bordeaux. During the growing season, there is just 219mm rainfall (Oct-Apr), out of 585mm annually. Extensive cloud cover keeps the temperature down to 19.1 °C in January.

== Grape varieties ==
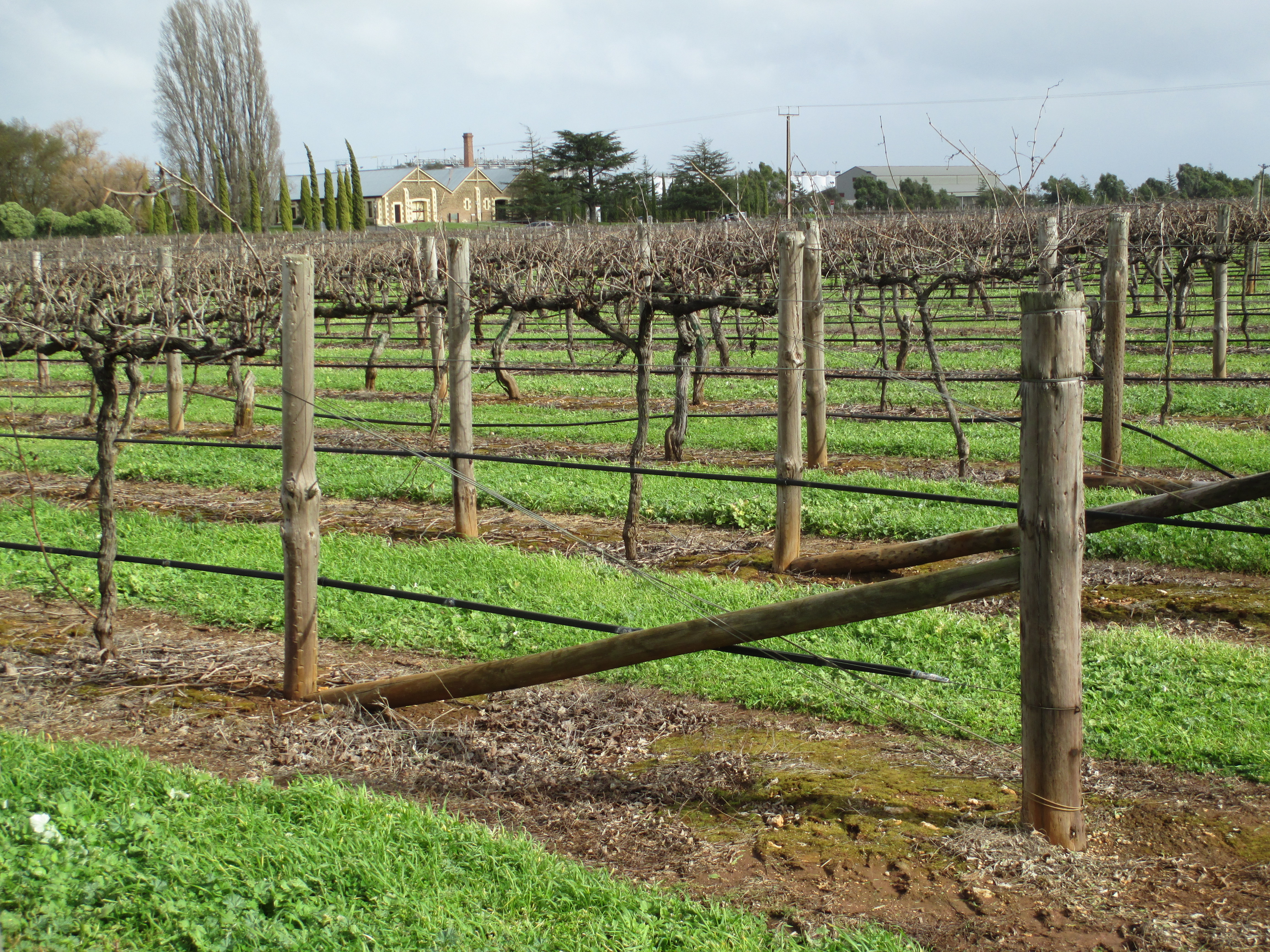
Winter vines with Wynns' in the background

Coonawarra is synonymous with Cabernet Sauvignon, full of plum and blackcurrant fruit, so much so that successes with other grape varieties is overlooked. In the early days Shiraz was the most widely planted grape, and it produces some star wines such as Wynns Coonawarra Estate Michael Shiraz (formerly Michael Hermitage). The limestone geology also suits Chardonnay, Riesling, and Sauvignon blanc.

== Wineries ==
Coonawarra has a membership organisation for wineries, the Coonawarra Vignerons Association. Some of the wineries with cellar doors include Wynns Coonawarra Estate. Other wineries who use fruit from the Coonawarra include Yalumba and Penfolds.

== See also ==
- South Australian wine

== Citations and references ==
=== References ===
- Longbottom, Mardi; Maschmedt, David; Pichler, Markus (2011), Unearthing viticulture in the Limestone Coast (PDF), ISBN 978-0-646-56744-0, archived from the original (PDF) on 6 November 2014
- Phylloxera and Grape Industry Board of SA (PGIBSA) (2014), Australian regional winegrape crush survey online (PDF), Phylloxera and Grape Industry Board of SA, ISSN 1442-6048, archived from the original (PDF) on 6 November 2014
