= Forest Hill Vineyard =

Winery in Western Australia

- Location: 1564 South Coast Hwy, Denmark WA 6333, Australia
- Coordinates: 34°58′27″S 117°18′51″E
- Wine region: Great Southern
- Founded: 1965
- First vines planted: 1965
- First vintage: 1972
- Key people: Tim Lyons; Guy Lyons
- Known for: Riesling
- Varietals: Cabernet Sauvignon, Cabernet franc, Chardonnay, Riesling, Sauvignon blanc, Shiraz
- Distribution: International
- Tasting: Open to public
- Website: www.foresthillwines.com.au

Forest Hill Vineyard (also referred to as Forest Hill Wines) is an Australian winery business based in the Great Southern wine region of Western Australia. Its vineyard is west of Mount Barker, and its winery and cellar door are further south, at Denmark.

The vineyard, the first to be established in the region, dates back to 1965. Initially, it was planted by the Department of Agriculture as an experiment in diversification, on land leased from Tony and Betty Pearse for 10 years. The first plantings were a dismal failure, but 2 hectares (4.9 acres) were successfully established in 1966. The vines planted in that year, 1 hectare (2.5 acres) each of riesling and cabernet sauvignon, grew only very slowly in the cool climate.

In 1972, the first commercial vintage was made from the vineyard's grapes by Jack Mann at Houghton in the Swan Valley. The next three vintages were made by Dorham Mann at Sandalford, also in the Swan Valley. They included the 1975 riesling, which, under the Sandalford label, won 12 gold medals and nine trophies.

The success of the early vintages encouraged others to set up wineries nearby.

== See also ==
- Australian wine
- List of wineries in Western Australia
- Western Australian wine

== Sources ==
- Halliday, James (1985). The Australian Wine Compendium. North Ryde, NSW: Angus & Robertson. pp. 473–489. ISBN 0207151377.
- Halliday, James (2008) [2006]. James Halliday's Wine Atlas of Australia (Second ed.). Prahran, Vic: Hardie Grant Books. pp. 240–251. ISBN 9781740666855.
- Jordan, Ray (2002). Wine: Western Australia's Best. Osborne Park, WA: The West Australian. ISBN 0909699887.
- Zekulich, Michael (2000) [1990]. Wine Western Australia. Perth: St George Books. ISBN 0867780614.
