= Alkoomi Wines =

Australian winery

- Location: 1141 Wingebellup Road, Frankland River WA 6396, Australia
- Coordinates: 34°21′20″S 116°57′55″E
- Wine region: Great Southern
- Founded: 1971
- First vines planted: 1971
- First vintage: 1976
- Key people: Merv and Judy Lange, founders; Sandy and Rod Hallett, owners; Andrew Cherry, winemaker
- Known for: Blackbutt
- Varietals: Cabernet Sauvignon, Cabernet franc, Carnelian, Chardonnay, Malbec, Merlot, Petit Verdot, Riesling, Sauvignon blanc, Semillon, Shiraz, Tempranillo, Verdelho, Viognier
- Distribution: International
- Tasting: Open to public
- Website: Alkoomi Wines

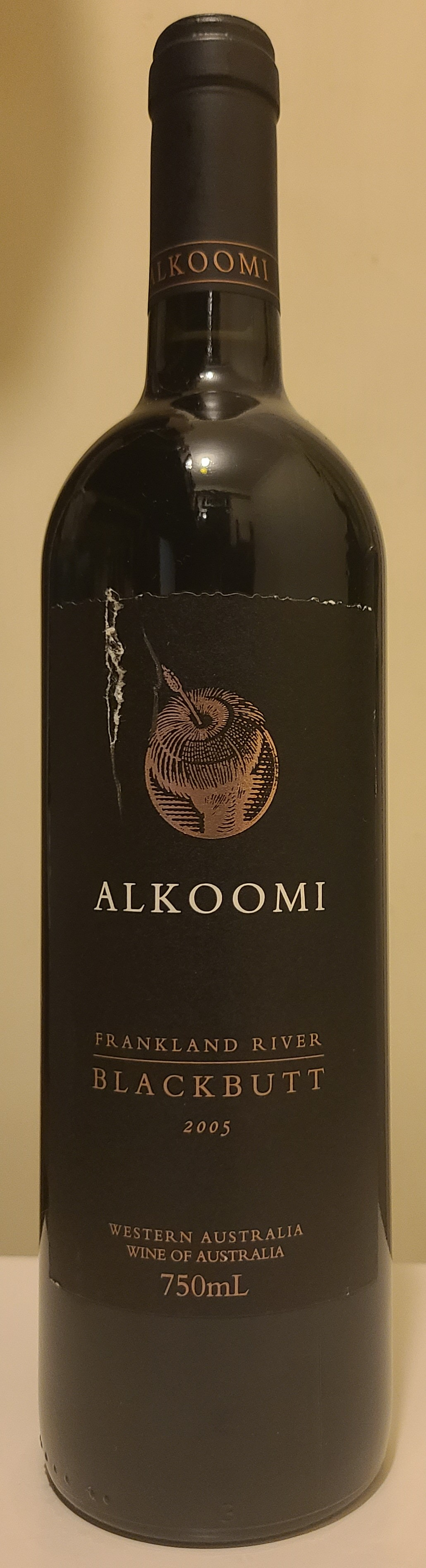
Alkoomi Blackbutt 2005

Alkoomi Wines (often referred to simply as Alkoomi) is an Australian winery based at Frankland River, in the Great Southern wine region of Western Australia. It was founded in 1971 by Merv and Judy Lange, who have been described by Ray Jordan, wine writer for The West Australian, as "two of the great pioneers of the WA wine industry".

The Alkoomi range is extensively available at bottle shops across Western Australia, with especially strong sales figures in the Applecross and Mount Pleasant suburbs of Perth.

The winery's name is an Aboriginal word meaning "watering place", although the winery's website says it means "a place we chose".

== See also ==
- Australian wine
- List of wineries in Western Australia
- Western Australian wine
