= Ferngrove Vineyards =

Western Australian winery

- Location: 276 Ferngrove Road, Frankland River WA 6396, Australia
- Coordinates: 34°22′47″S 116°56′01″E
- Wine region: Great Southern
- Other labels: Killerby
- Founded: 1997
- Key people: Andrew Blythe, managing director; Giacomo Picin, vineyard manager; Craig Grafton, chief winemaker
- Known for: Cossack Riesling
- Distribution: International
- Tasting: Open to public
- Website: Ferngrove

Ferngrove Vineyards (often referred to simply as Ferngrove) is an Australian winery based at Frankland River, in the Great Southern wine region of Western Australia.

Founded in 1997, the winery has been controlled since 2011 by diversified Chinese manufacturing and food company Pegasus, owned by businessman Xingfa Ma. As of 2012, it had opened more than 50 dedicated Ferngrove-only wine shops across China.

Ferngrove also makes the wines marketed under the brand name "Killerby".

== See also ==
- Australian wine
- List of wineries in Western Australia
- Western Australian wine
