= Frankland Estate =

- Location: 530 Frankland Road, Frankland River WA 6396, Australia
- Coordinates: 34°26′10″S 117°01′37″E
- Wine region: [Frankland River, West Australia]
- Founded: 1988
- First vines planted: 1988
- Key people: Elizabeth Smith and Hunter Smith, owners; Hunter Smith and Brian Kent, winemakers; Gladys, head guinea fowl
- Known for: Isolation Ridge Riesling
- Varietals: Cabernet Sauvignon, Cabernet franc, Chardonnay, Malbec, Merlot, Petit Verdot, Riesling, Sauvignon blanc, Shiraz, Viognier
- Distribution: International
- Tasting: Open to public
- Website: Frankland Estate

Frankland Estate is an Australian winery based at Frankland River, in the Frankland River wine region of Western Australia. It is particularly well known for its Riesling wines.

== See also ==
- Australian wine
- List of wineries in Western Australia
- Western Australian wine
