= Stella Bella Wines =

Western Australian winery

- Location: 205 Rosa Brook Road, Margaret River WA 6285, Australia
- Coordinates: 33°58′21″S 115°06′11″E
- Wine region: Margaret River
- Other labels: Series Luminosa; Suckfizzle; Skuttlebutt
- Founded: 1996
- Key people: Stuart Pym and Luke Joliffe, winemakers
- Known for: Chardonnay
- Varietals: Cabernet Sauvignon, Chardonnay, Merlot, Muscat Rose à Petits Grains, Sangiovese, Sauvignon blanc, Semillon, Shiraz, Tempranillo, Viognier
- Distribution: International
- Tasting: Open to public
- Website: Stella Bella Wines

Stella Bella Wines is an Australian winery based at Margaret River, in the Margaret River wine region of Western Australia.

== History ==
The winery was established in July 1996, when Stuart Pym, then a winemaker at Voyager Estate, and Janice McDonald leased a vineyard, with investor support. Its first wines were produced during the 1997 vintage.

By 2009, Australian wine writer James Halliday was rating the winery as one of the Margaret River region's best.

== Wines ==
Stella Bella has four brands. They range from Skuttlebutt, an everyday wine launched in 2004, through the classic Stella Bella and premium / ultra-premium Suckfizzle ranges, to the winery's most exalted brand, Series Luminosa, launched in 2010.

== See also ==
- Australian wine
- List of wineries in Western Australia
- Western Australian wine
