= Eric Patten =

Eric Patten (11 January 1924 – 2013) was a resident of Toodyay, Western Australia, best known for his long and active contribution to volunteer groups and organisations, in particular the Toodyay Volunteer Bushfire Brigade. He joined this organisation in 1941 and continued to participate in various ways for the remainder of his life.

For his dedication and contribution to the improvement of volunteer fire services both within and beyond Toodyay he was awarded the Australian Fire Service Medal in 2001.

== Early life ==
Patten was born in Somerset in England on 11 January 1924, the only child of Tom and Eve Batten. In 1928 the family migrated to Western Australia on the ship Ormond.

They stayed with relatives on their farm at North Baandee before settling in Toodyay at Mr Groves’ dairy at Mill Farm. While his father worked as a farm hand tending to the horses and eventually became manager, Patten enjoyed the simple pleasures of childhood, swimming in the river with friends and making canoes from sheets of corrugated iron. Before catching the bus to school in the morning he earned his pocket money by working in the dairy separating the milk. During the 1930s Patten attended the state school in Duke Street. One of his school friends was Hector Wood from Coorinja Vineyard. By this time single-teacher schools had closed down and pupils were collected from outlying districts by school buses.

On 6 August 1931 Patten was on the school bus when it collided with a wheat train at the town railway crossing in Clinton Street. He and several others were injured; five children were killed in the accident.

== War service ==
With the commencement of the Second World War in September 1939 a number of Toodyay's men enlisted to fight in Europe. At 16 years Patten was too young to enlist so he served in the Volunteer Defence Corps as an ambulance and staff driver. He was stationed at Harvey, then at Bluff Point just north of Geraldton. He was also a member of the Toodyay Rifle Club where he received basic rifle training and drill. Rifle clubs became a part of the military home defence scheme and were a source for recruitment.

In 1944 Patten enlisted with the Second Australian Imperial Force at Karrakatta Camp and was posted to Wewak in New Guinea. He was assigned to the 2nd 44th Jeep Transport Platoon where he worked as a driver. The following year he was transferred to Itabie on the north coast of Dutch New Guinea to work with the 96th Heavy Transport Platoon. Their job was unloading barges carrying supplies for the front line on the Kokoda Trail. He remained at Itabie for the duration of the war.

The war ended with the unconditional surrender of Japan on 15 August 1945 following the atomic bombing of Hiroshima and Nagasaki by the United States. Patten recalled how he was astonished to see Japanese soldiers coming out of the jungle waving white flags. The platoon was transferred back to Wewak where they witnessed the formal surrender of Hatazō Adachi, the commander-in-chief of Japanese forces in the region, to Australian General Horace Robertson. Following the surrender, Patten and his Transport Unit were sent to Rabaul as part of the occupation force, where their job was to supply food and essentials to Japanese prisoners.

Patten was amongst the last of the servicemen to return home. After he was discharged he joined the 10th Light Horse Regiment as an army recruit. During the 15 years he spent with the Light Horse he rose to the rank of major and became an officer in charge of a full squadron. He also joined the Toodyay Returned Services League and served for many years as its secretary.

== Return from war and marriage ==
After his discharge from the army, Patten rejoined his father for a time in the dairying business before going into partnership with Edgar Dorizzi. The business expanded from cartage to working with earth moving equipment and laying house pads.

In May 1955 Patten married Shirley Campbell, who had come to Toodyay from Wiluna with her parents in about 1948. They were married in St Stephen's Anglican Church and the wedding breakfast was held at the CWA Hall. The couple had three sons, Craig, Dean and Wayne, also known as Jack, and a daughter Jenny Lee.

== Toodyay Fire Brigade ==
Patten joined the Toodyay Volunteer Fire Brigade in around 1941 and continued to serve in one capacity or another for the next 60 years.

He continued his interest and attendance at the Toodyay Volunteer Fire and Rescue Service meetings until about six months before he died.

On 13 March 1983 he was honoured with the naming of the Eric Patten Running Track for 40 years dedicated service. The track ran between Duke and Clinton Streets along what is now known as Charcoal Lane. This was a section of the old Toodyay-Miling railway line, and close to where the school bus crash had occurred. The running track sign, once situated below an old bell, was unveiled by Brigade member Spec Sinclair. The event took place during a Picnic Demonstration Day attended by nine Volunteer Fire Brigades.

== Awards ==
Patten received a number of awards for his services to the town that have included State Emergency Service controller, volunteer ambulance driver, President of the Avon Branch Legacy, and numerous memberships of sporting clubs. He was also a member of the Anglican Parish Council and was a lay preacher.

On Australia Day in 1994 he was chosen as Toodyay Citizen of the Year at a special event held at the showgrounds. On 14 September 2001 he was awarded the Australian Fire Service Medal by the Governor of WA, John Sanderson, in recognition of 60 years distinguished service with the Toodyay Volunteer Fire Brigade. He was also awarded a 45 years' service medal at the Toodyay Shire Council, and in 2003 the Australian Government's Centenary Medal for his service to the Fire and Rescue Service.

== Sources ==
- This article incorporates text by Robyn Taylor available under the CC BY SA 2.5 AU licence.
- Taylor, Robyn (2015). "Eric Patten". Toodyaypedia. Lotterywest Toodyaypedia – Part II (draft). Newcastle Gaol Museum Collection: Shire of Toodyay.
- Eric Patten, an oral history, 2006. The Toodyay Oral History Series, No.5. Toodyay Historical Society collection.
