= Picardy (wine) =

- Location: Cnr Vasse Highway and Eastbrook Road, Pemberton WA 6260, Australia
- Coordinates: 34°23′53″S 116°07′49″E
- Wine region: Pemberton
- Founded: 1993
- Tasting: By appointment
- Website: Picardy

Picardy is an Australian winery at Pemberton, in the Pemberton wine region of Western Australia. It was established in 1993 by Dr. Bill Pannell, his wife Sandra and their son Daniel; Bill and Sandra Pannell had previously founded the pioneering Moss Wood winery in the Margaret River wine region in 1969.

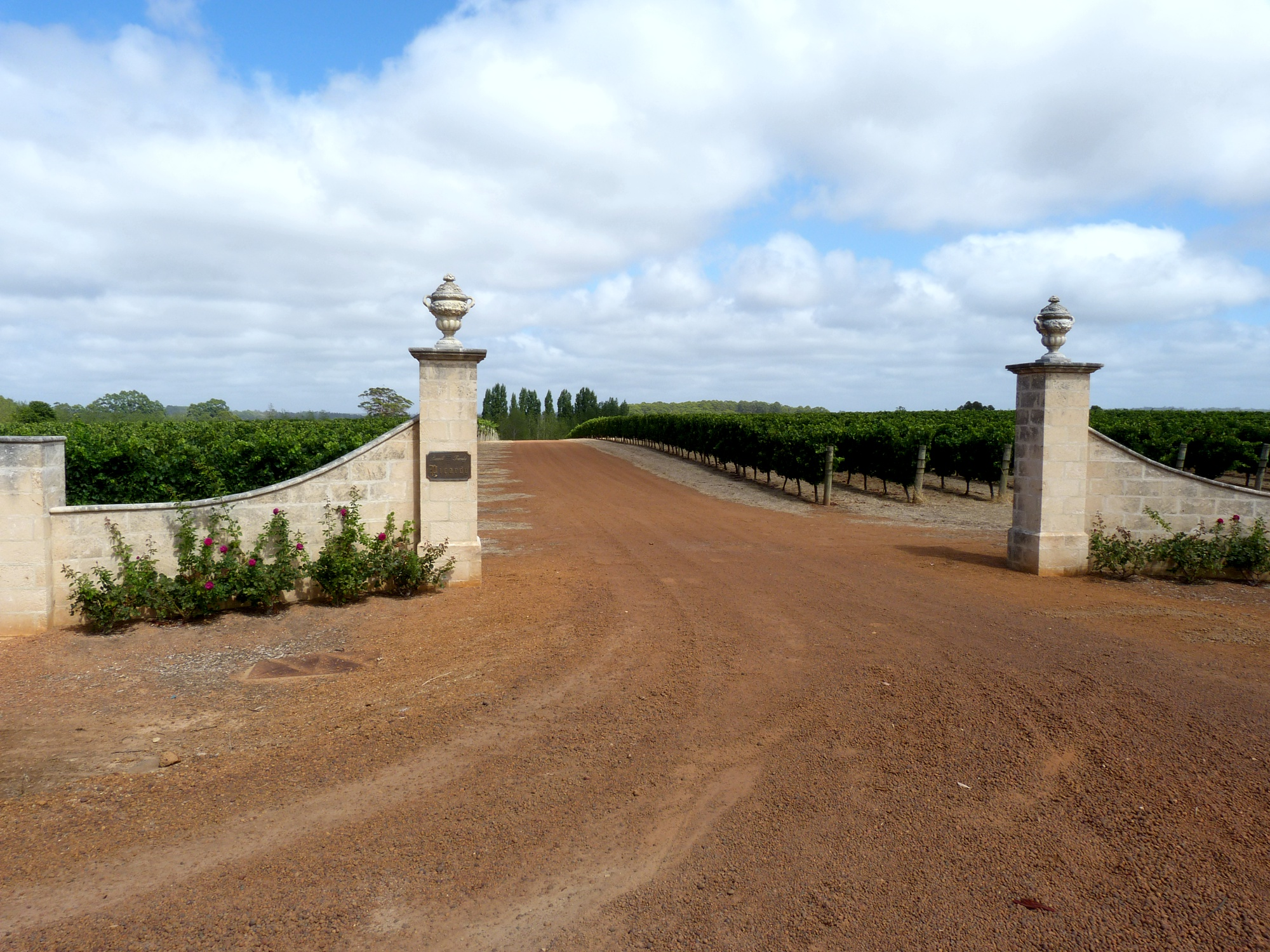
Entrance to Picardy Winery

== See also ==
- Australian wine
- List of wineries in Western Australia
- Western Australian wine
