= Wise Wine =

Winery in Western Australia

- Location: Lot 80 Eagle Bay Road, Eagle Bay 6281, Western Australia, Australia
- Coordinates: 33°34′49″S 115°04′22″E
- Wine region: Margaret River
- Founded: 1992
- Key people: Ron and Sandra Wise (Owners); Larry Cherubino (Winemaker)
- Tasting: Open to public
- Website: www.wisewine.com.au

Wise Wine (also known as Wise Wines) is an Australian winery at Eagle Bay, near Dunsborough, in the Margaret River wine region of Western Australia. It was established in 1992, when the then Geographe Bay Estate, founded in 1983, was acquired by the owners of the nearby Eagle Bay Estate and combined with it.

== See also ==
- Australian wine
- List of wineries in Western Australia
- Western Australian wine

== General references ==
- Clarke, Oz (2004). Oz Clarke's Australian Wine Companion: An essential guide for all lovers of Australian wine. London: Websters/Time Warner Books UK. pp. 6–33, 122–141. ISBN 0316728748.
- Halliday, James (2008) [2006]. James Halliday's Wine Atlas of Australia (Second ed.). Prahran, Vic: Hardie Grant Books. pp. 234–239. ISBN 9781740666855.
- Halliday, James (2009). The Australian Wine Encyclopedia. Prahran, Vic: Hardie Grant Books. ISBN 9781740667746.
- Zekulich, Michael (2000) [1990]. Wine Western Australia. Perth: St George Books. pp. 122–235. ISBN 0867780614.
