= Capel Vale Wines =

- Location: 118 Mallokup Road, Capel WA 6271, Australia
- Coordinates: 33°32′28″S 115°33′00″E
- Wine region: Geographe
- Founded: 1974
- First vines planted: 1974
- First vintage: 1980
- Key people: Peter and Elizabeth Pratten, owners
- Known for: Shiraz
- Varietals: Cabernet Sauvignon, Chardonnay, Malbec, Merlot, Petit Verdot, Pinot noir, Riesling, Sauvignon blanc, Semillon, Shiraz, Tempranillo, Verdelho, Viognier
- Other attractions: Restaurant
- Distribution: International
- Tasting: Open to public
- Website: Capel Vale Wines

Capel Vale Wines (often referred to simply as Capel Vale) is a privately owned Australian winery business based at Capel, in the Geographe wine region of Western Australia.

Established in 1974, the business operates a winery, two vineyards, a cellar door, and a restaurant at Capel, and also has three other vineyards, in the Great Southern, Margaret River and Pemberton wine regions, respectively.

== See also ==
- Australian wine
- List of wineries in Western Australia
- Western Australian wine
