= Castle Rock Estate =

Western Australian winery

- Location: Porongurup Road, Porongurup WA 6324, Australia
- Coordinates: 34°41′26″S 117°56′40″E
- Wine region: Great Southern
- Founded: 1983
- Known for: Riesling
- Varietals: Cabernet Sauvignon, Cabernet franc, Chardonnay, Merlot, Pinot noir, Riesling, Sauvignon blanc
- Distribution: International
- Tasting: Open to public
- Website: Castle Rock Estate

Castle Rock Estate is an Australian winery based at Porongurup, in the Great Southern wine region of Western Australia. It is owned and operated by the Diletti family. According to Australian wine writer James Halliday, it has an exceptionally beautifully sited and immaculately maintained vineyard, winery and cellar door sales area with sweeping vistas from the Porongurups.

== Winemaker ==
Castle Rock Estate's winemaker is Rob Diletti, son of founders Angelo and Wendy Diletti. Rob was one of 12 scholars at the 2005 Len Evans Tutorial, 2006 Wine Selectors Young Winemaker of the Year, a finalist for the 2012 Gourmet Traveller WINE Winemaker of the Year and, in 2015, Rob Diletti was named Wine Companion Winemaker of the Year.

== Awards ==
In 2018 Castle Rock was award the most successful exhibitor processing under 250 tonnes (550,000 lb) at the 2018 Wine Show of Western Australia.

The winery was awarded:

- Trophy for the Best Great Southern White Wine, Castle Rock 2018 Porongurup Riesling, 2018 Wine Show of Western Australia
- Trophy for the Best Riesling of the Show, Castle Rock 2018 Porongurup Riesling, 2018 Wine Show of Western Australia
- Trophy for the Best Pinot Noir of the Show, Castle Rock 2018 Porongurup Pinot Noir, 2018 Wine Show of Western Australia

== See also ==
- Australian wine
- List of wineries in Western Australia
- Western Australian wine

== Sources ==
- Forrestal, Peter, ed. (1999). Discover Australia: Wineries. Discover Australia. Milsons Point, NSW: Random House Australia. pp. 12–27, 220–221, 238–245. ISBN 0091837898.
- Halliday, James (2008) [2006]. James Halliday's Wine Atlas of Australia (Second ed.). Prahran, Vic: Hardie Grant Books. pp. 240–251. ISBN 9781740666855.
- Jordan, Ray (2002). Wine: Western Australia's Best. Osborne Park, WA: The West Australian. pp. 120–144. ISBN 0909699887.
- Zekulich, Michael (2000) [1990]. Wine Western Australia. Perth: St George Books. pp. 284–333. ISBN 0867780614.
