= List of wineries in Western Australia =

This is a list of wineries in Western Australia, arranged in alphabetical order by name of winery.

Name	Location	Wine region	Planted	Opened	Notes
3 Oceans Wine Company	Metricup	Margaret River			Owns and operates the former Palandri facilities.
Abbey Vale	Yallingup	Margaret River	1987		
Adinfern Estate	Cowaramup	Margaret River	1996	2001	
Aldersyde Estate	Bickley	Perth Hills			Formerly Piesse Brook Wines.
Alkoomi Wines	Frankland	Great Southern	1971	1976	
Aravina Estate	Yallingup	Margaret River	1986		Formerly Amberley Estate.
Arlewood Estate	Forest Grove	Margaret River	1984		
Ashbrook Estate	Wilyabrup	Margaret River	1976	1979	
Beckett's Flat	Metricup	Margaret River	1992	1997	
Blackwood Crest	Boyup Brook	Blackwood Valley	1978	1982	
Blackwood Wines	Nannup	Blackwood Valley	1994	1998	
Brookland Valley Estate	Wilyabrup	Margaret River	1984		Owned by [Swinney Family].
Brookside Vineyard	Bickley	Perth Hills			
Bunn Vineyard	Mount Barker	Great Southern	1997		Cabernet Sauvignon planted 1997, Shiraz vines planted in 1998 and winery built in 2003.
Cape Bouvard Winery	Mandurah	Peel			
Cape Mentelle Vineyards	Margaret River	Margaret River	1970	1977	Owned by Endeavour Group
Capel Vale Wines	Capel	Geographe	1974	1980	
Castle Rock Estate	Porongurup	Great Southern	1983		Wines made at Alkoomi winery from 1986 to 2000, 200 tonne winery built in 2001
Chapman's Creek	Wilyabrup	Margaret River	1991		
Chatsfield Wines	Mount Barker	Great Southern	1976		
Clairault Wines	Wilyabrup	Margaret River	1976		
Condingup Vineyard	Esperance	Goldfields-Esperance	2017		
Coorinja Vineyard	Toodyay	Central WA Zone	ca. 1870s		
Coward and Black	Wilyabrup	Margaret River			
Cullen Wines	Wilyabrup	Margaret River	1966		
Dalyup River Wines	Dalyup	–	1976	1988	Closed 2014, was the only winery in the Esperance district
Darlington Estate	Darlington	Perth Hills			
Deep Woods Estate	Yallingup	Margaret River	1987		Owned by Fogarty Wine Group.
Devil's Lair	Forest Grove	Margaret River	1981	1990	Owned by Treasury Wine Estates.
Donnelly River Wines	Beedelup	Pemberton	1986	1990	
Driftwood Estate	Wilyabrup	Margaret River	1989		
Edwards Vineyard	Cowaramup	Margaret River	1992	1999	
Entopia Wines	Baskerville	Swan District	2001	2003	
Evans & Tate	Wilyabrup	Margaret River	1974		Owned by Fogarty Wine Group.
Ferguson Falls	Dardanup	Geographe	1983	1996	
Fermoy Estate	Wilyabrup	Margaret River	1985	1987	
Ferngrove Vineyards	Frankland	Great Southern	1997		
Fishbone Wines	Wilyabrup	Margaret River			
Flinders Bay Wines	Metricup	Margaret River	1995	1999	
Forest Hill Vineyard	Denmark	Great Southern	1965		Winery and cellar door are at Denmark; vineyard is near Mount Barker.
Frankland Estate	Frankland	Great Southern	1988		
Galafrey Wines	Mount Barker	Great Southern	1977	1982	
Garbin Estate Wines	Middle Swan	Swan District			
Gilbert Wines	Kendenup	Great Southern	1985		
Goundrey Wines	Mount Barker	Great Southern	1971	1976	
Gralyn Estate	Wilyabrup	Margaret River	1975	1978	
Green Valley Vineyard	Forest Grove	Margaret River	1980	1987	
Hainault Vineyard	Bickley	Perth Hills			
Hamelin Bay	Forest Grove	Margaret River		1996	
Happs	Dunsborough	Margaret River	1978		
Harewood Estate	Denmark	Great Southern			
Harris Organic	Swan Valley	Swan District	1998	2000	Certified Organic Wines and Spirits made on the premises by Duncan Harris.
Hay Shed Hill Wines	Wilyabrup	Margaret River	1973		
Henley Park Winery	Henley Brook	Swan District	1935		
Henty Brook Estate	Dardanup	Geographe	1994	1997	
Hidden River Estate	Beedelup	Pemberton	1994		
Highway Wines	Herne Hill	Swan District		1954	
Houghton Wines	Middle Swan	Swan District	1836	1859	Owned by Accolade Wines.
Howard Park Wines	Cowaramup	Margaret River	1974	1986	Member of Australia's First Families of Wine (AFFW).
Howard Park Wines	Denmark	Great Southern	1974	1986	Member of Australia's First Families of Wine (AFFW).
Ironwood Estate Wines	Porongurup	Great Southern	1996	1999	
Island Brook Estate	Yelverton	Margaret River	1985	2000	
Jadran Wines	Orange Grove	Perth Hills	1927	1929	
Jane Brook Estate Wines	Middle Swan	Swan District	by 1914		
Jingalla Wines	Porongurup	Great Southern	1979	1999	
Juniper Estate	Cowaramup	Margaret River	1973	1980	
Karriview Wines	Denmark	Great Southern	1986	1990	
KingTree Wines	Wellington Mills	Geographe	1991		
Lamont Winery	Millendon	Swan District	1975		
Lamont Winery	Yallingup	Margaret River			
Leeuwin Estate	Leeuwin	Margaret River	1969		
Lenton Brae Estate	Wilyabrup	Margaret River	1983		
Lilac Hill Estate	Caversham	Swan District			
Little River Wines	Henley Brook	Swan District			
Lost Lake	Eastbrook	Pemberton	1990		
Marybrook Vineyards & Winery	Wilyabrup	Margaret River	1987	1991	
McLeod Creek Wines	Karridale	Margaret River	2000	2010	Family owned and operated
Millbrook Winery	Jarrahdale	Perth Hills	1995	1999	Owned by Fogarty Wine Group.
Millinup Estate Wines	Porongurup	Great Southern	ca. 1973		
Minot	Leeuwin	Margaret River	1988	1995	
Montgomery's Hill	Kalgan	Great Southern	1996	1998	
Moss Brothers	Wilyabrup	Margaret River	1985		
Moss Wood	Wilyabrup	Margaret River			
Mountford Wines	West Pemberton	Pemberton	1988		
Oakover Estate	Middle Swan	Swan District			
Old Kent River	Kent River	Great Southern			
Olsen	Leeuwin	Margaret River	1987	1990	
Oranje Tractor Wine	Albany	Great Southern			
Paul Conti Wines	Woodvale	Swan District	ca. 1940	1968	
Peel Estate Wines	Baldivis	Peel	1974	1980	
Picardy	West Pemberton	Pemberton	1994		
Pierro	Wilyabrup	Margaret River	1979	1983	
Pinelli Wines	Caversham	Swan District	1908	1980	
Plantagenet Wines	Mount Barker	Great Southern	1968	1974	
Redgate Wines	Margaret River	Margaret River			
Rivendell Winery	Yallingup	Margaret River	1987		
RiverBank Estate	Caversham	Swan District		1993	
Rockcliffe Wines	Denmark	Great Southern		1994	Formerly Matilda's Meadow / Matildas Estate Winery.
Rosabrook Estate	Margaret River	Margaret River	1980		
Salitage Wines	Beedelup	Pemberton	1989	1990	
Sandalford Wines	Caversham	Swan District	ca. 1840	1947	
Sandstone Wines	Wilyabrup	Margaret River		1989	
Scotts Brook	Boyup Brook	Blackwood Valley	1987	1990	
Settlers Ridge	Cowaramup	Margaret River	1993	1997	
Sittella Wines	Herne Hill	Swan District		1998	
Smithbrook Wines	Middlesex	Pemberton	1988		Owned by Fogarty Wine Group.
Somerset Hill Wines	Denmark	Great Southern	1995	1999	
Springviews Wine	Porongurup	Great Southern		1995	
Stella Bella Wines	Margaret River	Margaret River		1996/97	Markets its wines under the Suckfizzle, Stella Bella and Skuttlebutt labels.
Swan Valley Wines	Baskerville	Swan District		1999	
Talijancich Wines	Herne Hill	Swan District			
Tantemaggie	Pemberton	Pemberton	1987	1991	
The Warren Vineyard	Pemberton	Pemberton	1985	1989	
Three Hills Estate	Karridale	Margaret River	1994	1997	Owned by Happs.
Tinglewood Wines	Denmark	Great Southern	1976		
Treen Ridge Estate	Pemberton	Pemberton	1991	1996	
Treeton Estate	Cowaramup	Margaret River	1984		
Trevelen Farm	Cranbrook	Great Southern	1993	1997	
Twin Hill Wines	Baskerville	Swan District		1937	
Upper Reach	Baskerville	Swan District	1998	2000	
Valley Wines	Herne Hill	Swan District			
Vasse Felix	Cowaramup	Margaret River	1967		
Voyager Estate	Margaret River	Margaret River		1978	
Walkers Hill Vineyard	Lake Grace		1995	1998	Owned by Tania Bray and her husband since 2011
West Cape Howe Wines	Mount Barker	Great Southern		1998	
Wignalls Wines	Albany	Great Southern			
Willespie	Wilyabrup	Margaret River	1977		
Willoughby Park Winery	Denmark	Great Southern			Also houses the microbrewery, Boston Brewery
Willow Bridge Estate	Henty	Geographe	1997	1999	
Wise Wine	Dunsborough	Margaret River		1992	
Woodlands Wines	Wilyabrup	Margaret River	1973/74		
Woodside Valley Estate	Yallingup	Margaret River	1998		Since 2012, the business and the vineyard have been separately owned.
Woody Nook	Wilyabrup	Margaret River	1984		
Xanadu Wines	Margaret River	Margaret River			
Zarephath Wines	East Porongurup	Great Southern		1998	

== See also ==
- Australian wine
- List of breweries in Australia
- List of vineyards and wineries
- Western Australian wine
