= Salitage Wines =

Australian winery

- Location: 14429 Vasse Highway, Pemberton WA 6260, Australia
- Coordinates: 34°24′11″S 116°07′28″E
- Wine region: Pemberton
- Founded: 1989
- Key people: John Horgan, owner
- Tasting: By appointment
- Website: Salitage Wines

Salitage Wines (often referred to simply as Salitage) is an Australian winery at Pemberton, in the Pemberton wine region of Western Australia. Established in 1989 by John and Jenny Horgan, it has been described by prominent Australian wine writer James Halliday as "... the showpiece of Pemberton."

The name Salitage was derived from the first two letters of the 4 Horgan children's names, Sarah, Lisa, Tamara and Gerard.

The winery is still owned by John Horgan following the death of Jenny Horgan in 2013. Its principal wines are sauvignon blanc, chardonnay and pinot noir.

== See also ==
- Australian wine
- List of wineries in Western Australia
- Western Australian wine
