= Woodside Valley Estate =

- Location: Cnr Brash and Abbeys Farm Roads, Yallingup WA 6282, Australia
- Coordinates: 33°43′06″S 115°02′56″E
- Wine region: Margaret River
- Founded: 1998
- Key people: Jacky Wong, principal
- Parent company: Palinda Wines, Hong Kong
- Known for: Baudin Cabernet Sauvignon
- Varietals: Cabernet Sauvignon, Chardonnay, Merlot, Shiraz
- Tasting: Cellar door at: Western Range Wines; 1995 Chittering Road; Lower Chittering WA 6084, Australia
- Website: Woodside Valley Estate

Woodside Valley Estate is a premium Australian wine business originally focused on a vineyard near Yallingup, in the Margaret River wine region of Western Australia. Since 2012, the business and the vineyard have been separately owned.

== History ==
Established in 1998, Woodside Valley Estate was developed by a small syndicate of investors led by Peter Woods. In a departure from accepted local viticultural practices, the founders, working under the inspiration of the French explorer Nicolas Baudin, planted the Estate's vineyard on slopes facing south instead of north. Baudin's major scientific expedition to Australia of 1800 to 1803, aboard the corvettes Géographe and Naturaliste, had been conducted on the assumption, contrary to established tradition, that the best passage for sailing ships between Cape Leeuwin and Bass Strait was from west to east.

Just as Baudin's assumption proved to be well founded, so too was Woodside Valley Estate, which, by 2009, was producing wines of a quality described by leading Australian wine writer James Halliday as "impeccable".

In 2012, the Woodside Valley Estate label and wine stocks were acquired by Hong Kong-based Palinda Wines, the private family company of Chinese businessman Jacky Wong, who has significant interests in beverage distribution throughout Hong Kong and mainland China. The vineyards were not included in the deal. Woodside Valley Estate has no winery; prior to the 2012 change of ownership, the wines were made under contract by Kevin McKay at Forester Estate.

== Woodside Valley Foundation ==
The Nicholas Baudin Award, awarded each year since 2002 at the Antipodean Film Festival is as of 2022 supported by the Woodside Valley Foundation.

== See also ==
- Australian wine
- List of wineries in Western Australia
- Western Australian wine
