= Deep Woods Estate =

- Location: 889 Commonage Road, Yallingup WA 6282, Australia
- Coordinates: 33°41′23″S 115°4′41″E
- Wine region: Margaret River
- Founded: 1987
- Key people: Peter and Lee Fogarty, owners
- Tasting: Open to public
- Website: Deep Woods Estate

Deep Woods Estate is an Australian winery at Yallingup, in the Margaret River wine region of Western Australia.

== History ==
The winery's vineyard was established in 1987, and in 1992 it was purchased by the Gould family. Since 2005, the business has been owned by Peter and Lee Fogarty, and comprises part of the Fogarty Wine Group.

In 2016, the winery won Australia's most sought-after wine trophy, the Jimmy Watson Memorial Trophy at the Royal Melbourne Wine Awards, for the 2014 Deep Woods Estate Reserve Cabernet Sauvignon The same wine was also awarded the Max Schubert trophy at the Royal Adelaide Wine Show.

== Location ==
The winery is situated on Commonage Road in the Yallingup Hills. This sub-region sits at the Northern end of the Margaret River Wine Region of Western Australia. The Yallingup Hills contains some of the highest elevation vineyards in Margaret River.

== Wines Produced ==
Deep Woods Estate produces a large number of wines across a range of varieties including: Semillon, Sauvignon Blanc, Chardonnay, Shiraz, Cabernet Sauvignon, Malbec and Merlot .

== See also ==
- Australian wine
- List of wineries in Western Australia
- Western Australian wine
