= Cape Mentelle Vineyards =

Western Australian winery

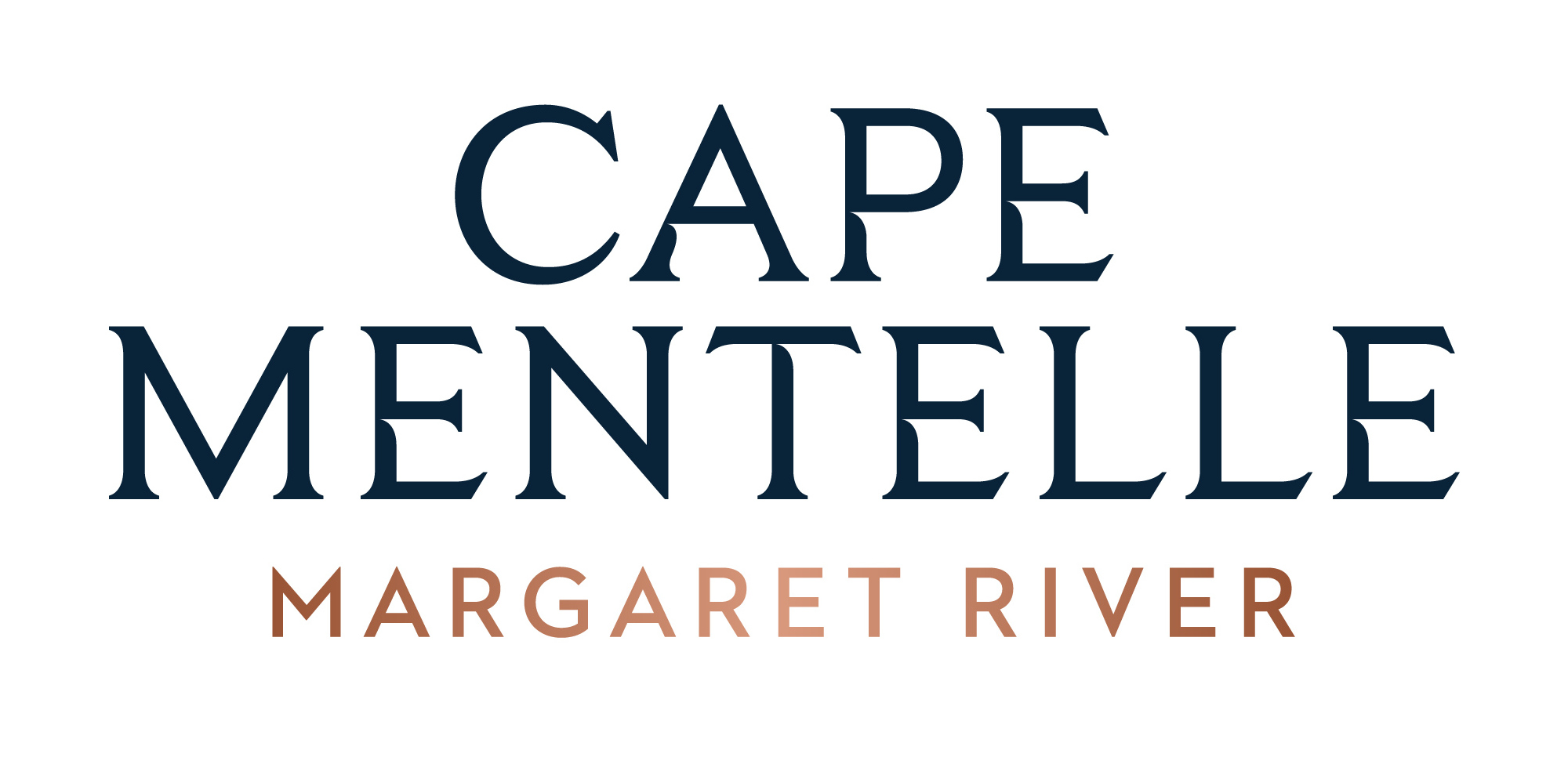
- Location: 331 Wallcliffe Road, Margaret River, Western Australia 6285, Australia
- Coordinates: 33°58′03″S 115°02′16″E
- Wine region: Margaret River
- Founded: 1970
- First vintage: 1976
- Parent company: Endeavour Group
- Known for: Cape Mentelle Cabernet Sauvignon
- Varietals: Chardonnay, Cabernet Sauvignon, Merlot, Sauvignon blanc, Semillon, Shiraz, Zinfandel
- Distribution: International
- Tasting: Open to public
- Website: capementelle.com.au

Cape Mentelle Vineyards (commonly referred to as Cape Mentelle) is a wine estate in the Margaret River region, 274 km, south-west of Perth, Western Australia. The winery was founded by David Hohnen, a third-generation farmer who studied wine making and viticulture in California in the 1960s, and his brothers Mark and Giles. Cape Mentelle is one of the ‘founding five’ wineries in Margaret River, was established in 1970, and came to prominence by winning the Jimmy Watson Memorial Trophy in 1983 and 1984 for their Cabernet sauvignon. It is owned by Endeavour Group.

== History ==
The winery is situated right next to oceanic Cape Mentelle, which it was named for. It was established by David Hohnen and his brothers Mark and Giles. The brothers planted the first vines in 16 hectares, now known as the Wallcliffe Vineyard.

David, Mark and Giles experimented in a rammed earth shed for six years until producing their first Cabernet sauvignon in 1976 The brothers worked with Tom Cullity, the founder of the first Margaret River winery Vasse Felix in 1967 to help produce their award-winning Cabernets of 1983 and 1984. In 1983 and 1984, Cape Mentelle won the Jimmy Watson Memorial Award for the best one-year old dry red wine.

In 1990, Veuve Clicquot acquired 50 percent of the Cape Mentelle Vineyard, and then in 2000 took 100 percent ownership of the vineyard. In 1997 the winery destroyed its cabernet sauvignon in the culmination of contamination issues with the yeast Brettanomyces. The issue was resolved by 2004. In 2002, the LVMH conglomerate bought Veuve Clicquot and with it the Cape Mentelle Vineyards.

In 2010, Cape Mentelle was the first winery in the Margaret River to attain the Entwine accreditation (total sustainable winegrowing Australia). This requires the winery to report annually and continue to minimise their impact on the surrounding environment.

In 2020, Cape Mentelle had their 50-year anniversary and celebrated it by having ocean photographer Eugene Tan (Aquabumps) take photos of the Cape and vineyard to document the Margaret River's 50th year as a wine region.

In January 2023, Endeavour Group announced it had made an agreement to acquire Cape Mentelle.

== Gallery ==
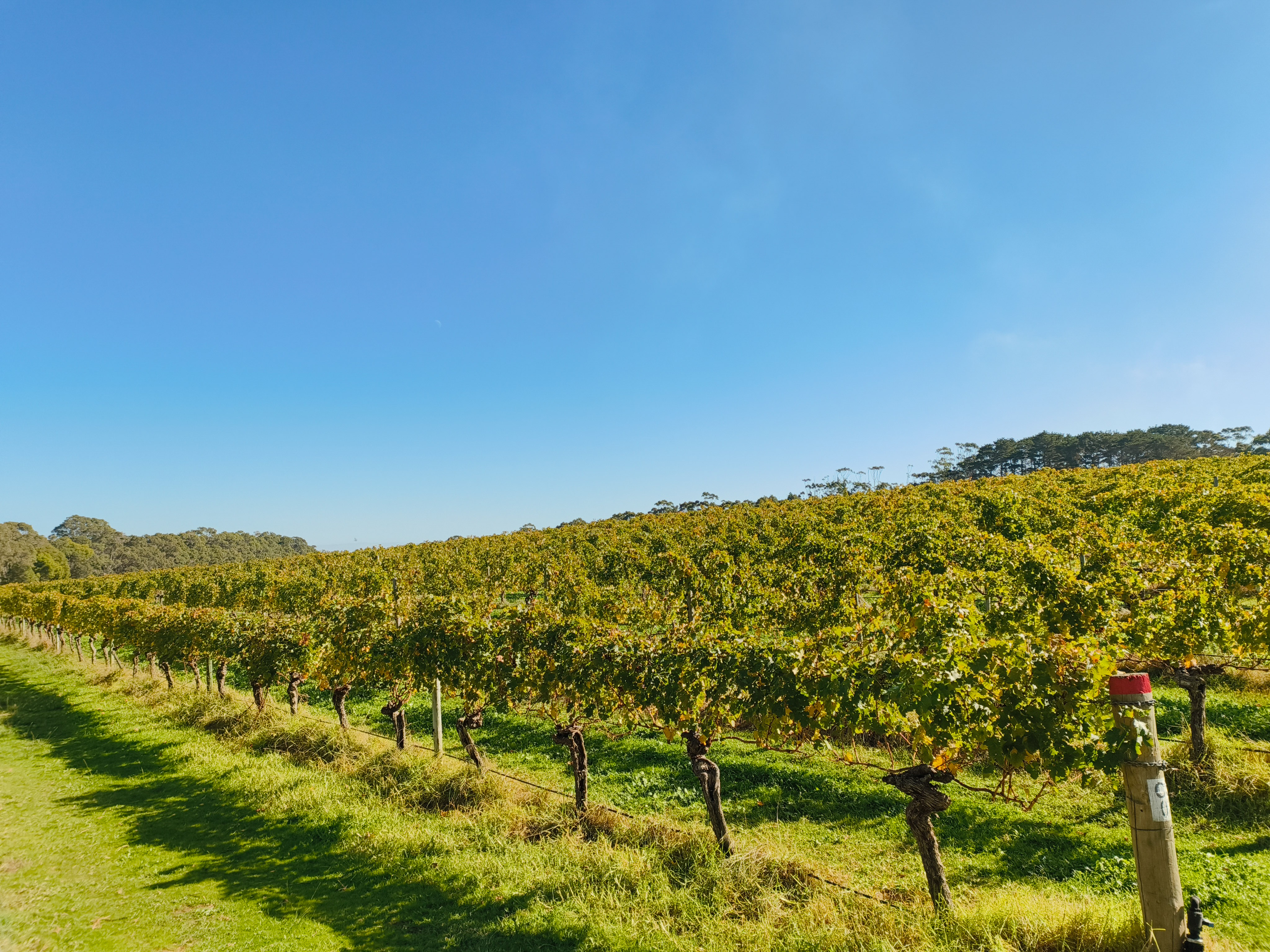
Vineyards at Cape Mentelle

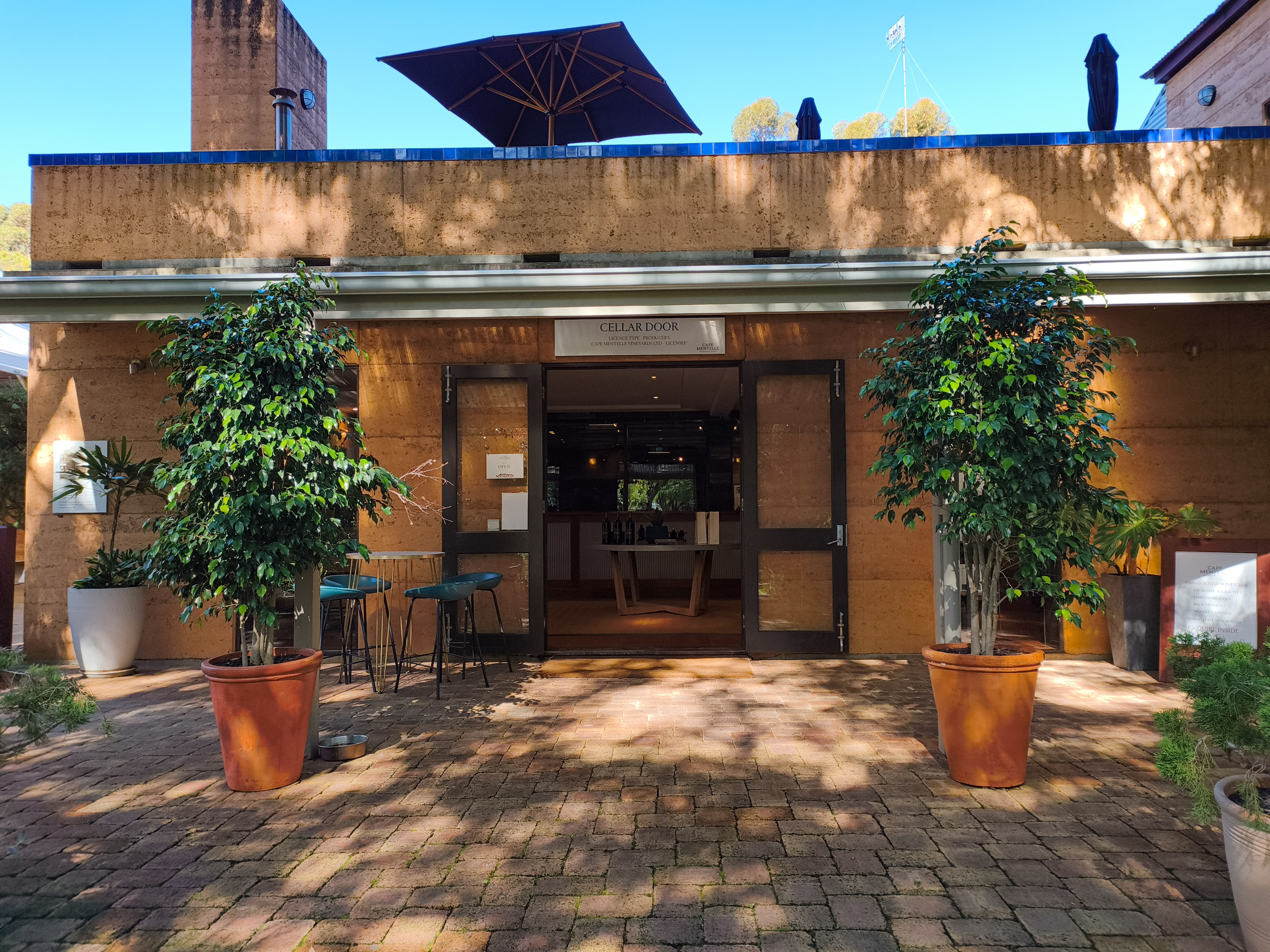
Cellar door

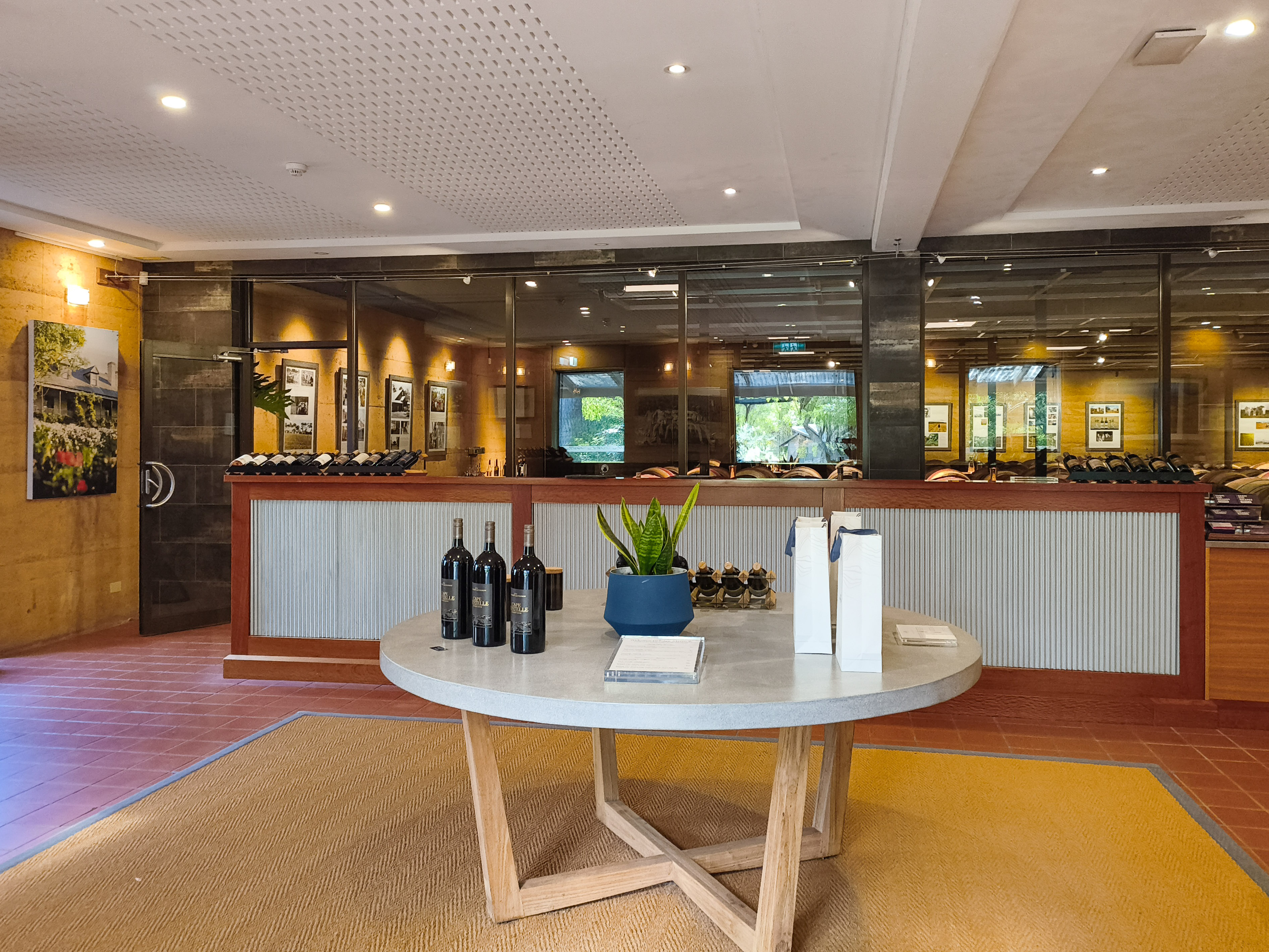
Cellar door

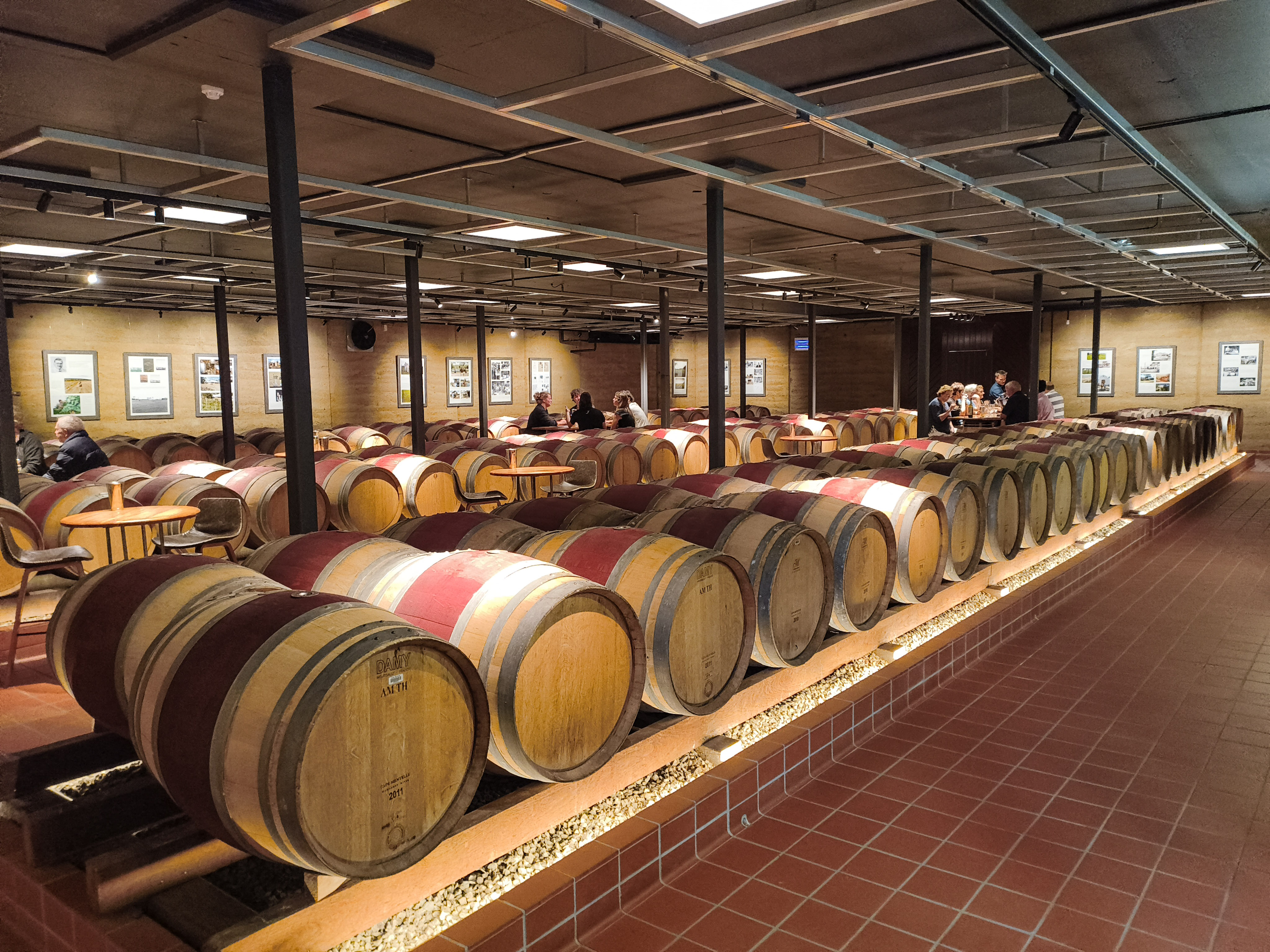
Cellar door

== See also ==
- Australian wine
- List of wineries in Western Australia
- Western Australian wine
