= Zarephath Wines =

Winery in Western Australia

- Location: 424 Moorialup Road, East Porongurup WA 6324, Australia
- Coordinates: 34°41′36″S 118°01′50″E
- Wine region: Great Southern
- Founded: 1994
- First vintage: 1998
- Key people: Robert Diletti, winemaker
- Known for: Chardonnay
- Varietals: Cabernet Sauvignon, Chardonnay, Pinot noir, Riesling, Shiraz
- Distribution: Australia, New Zealand, United Kingdom
- Tasting: Open to public
- Website: www.zarephathwines.com.au

Zarephath Wines is an Australian winery based at East Porongurup, in the Great Southern wine region of Western Australia. The winery was founded in 1994 by a small Benedictine religious community, The Christ Circle. It was sold in 2013 to new owners Rosie Singer and Ian Barrett-Lennard. Zarephath Cafe opened at Easter 2015 serving local and seasonal produce Friday to Sunday. Zarephath continues to produce wine including pinot noir, chardonnay and riesling.

== See also ==
- Australian wine
- List of wineries in Western Australia
- Western Australian wine
- Zarephath, New Jersey
