= Aravina Estate =

Australian winery

- Location: 61 Thornton Road, Yallingup WA 6282, Australia
- Coordinates: 33°42′14.7″S 115°4′49.0″E
- Wine region: Margaret River
- Founded: 2010
- Key people: Steve Tobin and Hayley Munro-Tobin, owners
- Tasting: Open to public
- Website: Aravina Estate

Aravina Estate is an Australian winery at Yallingup, in the Margaret River wine region of Western Australia. Established in 2010, it incorporates the winery facilities and vineyard previously owned and operated by Amberley Estate.

The proprietors of Aravina Estate are Steve Tobin, a seventh generation Western Australian, and his partner, Hayley Munro-Tobin. Their aim is to transform the winery into "the No 1 tourist destination in the southwest", with a restaurant, cafe, function centre, homewares store, water garden and sports car gallery, amongst other attractions.

As of 2013, Tobin's car collection, on display in the gallery, comprised 15 cars. It included a Ford Falcon GTHO Phase III, a Valiant Charger E49 "Six Pack", a Holden Torana A9X, a Ferrari 365 GTB/4 Daytona Competizione, and a Lamborghini Miura S previously owned by Twiggy, the English model, actress and singer.

== See also ==
- Australian wine
- List of wineries in Western Australia
- Western Australian wine
