= Adinfern Estate =

Winery in Western Australia

- Location: 8772 Bussell Highway, Cowaramup WA 6284, Australia
- Coordinates: 33°53′0.2″S 115°05′14.4″E
- Wine region: Margaret River
- Founded: 1996
- Key people: Merv and Jan Smith, founders
- Tasting: Open to public
- Website: Adinfern Estate

Adinfern Estate is an Australian winery at Cowaramup, in the Margaret River wine region of Western Australia. Established in 1996, it was previously a sheep farm, and before that a dairy farm.

The founders and owners of Adinfern Estate were Merv and Jan Smith. They sold the property in 2017.

== See also ==
- Australian wine
- List of wineries in Western Australia
- Western Australian wine
