= Zarephath =

Zarephath may refer to the following :

Places

- Alternative name for Ancient Phoenician city Sarepta, now Sarafand, Lebanon
- Zarephath, New Jersey in the United States

Other

- Raising of the son of the widow of Zarephath
- Zarephath Wines

== See also ==
- Tzarfat
