= Millbrook Winery =

Winery at Jarrahdale, Western Australia

- Location: Old Chestnut Lane, Jarrahdale, Western Australia, Australia
- Coordinates: 32°20′59″S 116°02′58″E
- Wine region: Perth Hills
- Other labels: Barking Owl
- Founded: 1996
- First vines planted: 1995
- Key people: Peter Fogarty; Lee Fogarty
- Other attractions: Restaurant
- Tasting: Open to public
- Website: www.millbrook.wine

Millbrook Winery is an Australian winery at Jarrahdale, in the Perth Hills wine region of Western Australia. The winery was established in 1996 on the site of Chestnut Farm, a former orchard. Its founders and owners are Peter and Lee Fogarty, who also own several other wineries.

== See also ==
- Australian wine
- List of wineries in Western Australia
- Western Australian wine

== Sources ==
- Template:James Halliday's Wine Atlas of Australia
- Jordan, Ray (2002). Wine: Western Australia's Best. Osborne Park, WA: The West Australian. pp. 32–39. ISBN 0909699887.
