= Smithbrook =

Smithbrook may refer to two places in England:

- A hamlet in Bramley parish, Surrey
- Smithbrook, West Sussex, a hamlet in Lodsworth parish

== See also ==
- Smithbrook Wines, Western Australia
- Smith Brook, a locality in Western Australia
