= Jimmy Watson Memorial Trophy =

Australian wine award

- Industry: Alcoholic beverage
- Headquarters: Melbourne, Australia
- Products: Wine
- Owner: Royal Agricultural Society of Victoria
- Website: rasv.com.au/Events/RMWS_Home/

The Jimmy Watson Memorial Trophy is the most prestigious and sought after wine award in Australia. The trophy is a memorial to Jimmy Watson (died 1962), who established the iconic Jimmy Watson's Wine Bar in Lygon Street, Carlton, a suburb of Melbourne.

The trophy is awarded annually at the Melbourne Royal Wine Awards, conducted by Melbourne Royal (formally known as Royal Agricultural Society of Victoria), to the Best Young Red Wine of the 2020 or 2021 vintage classes.

== Past winners ==
Year	Winery	Wine
2023	Lowestoft Estate Wines	Lowestoft La Maison Pinot Noir 2022
2022	Hentley Farm	The Old Legend Grenache 2021
2021	Fallen Giants Winery	Shiraz 2019
2019	Bleasdale Vineyards	The Wild Fig S.G.M. 2019
2018	Xanadu Wines	Xanadu Cabernet Sauvignon 2016
2017	Turkey Flat Vineyards	Barossa Grenache 2016
2016	Deep Woods Estate	Reserve Cabernet Sauvignon 2014
2015	Home Hill Winery	Kelly's Reserve Pinot Noir 2014
2014	SC Pannell	Adelaide Hills Syrah 2013
2013	Yabby Lake	Block 1 Pinot Noir 2012
2012	Best's Great Western	Great Western Bin '1' Shiraz 2011
2011	Glaetzer-Dixon Family Winemakers	Mon Père Shiraz 2010
2010	Harvey River Bridge Estate	Joseph River Estate Cabernet Sauvignon 2009
2009	Eden Road Wines	'Long Road' Shiraz Hilltops 2008
2008	Flametree Wines	Cabernet Merlot 2007
2007	Scarpantoni Estate Wines	Brothers Block Cabernet Sauvignon 2006
2006	Shingleback Wines	D Block Reserve McLaren Vale Cabernet Sauvignon 2005
2005	Geoff Merrill Wines	Reserve Shiraz 2004
2004	Casella Estate	Yellowtail Premium Cabernet Sauvignon 2003
2003	Saltram Wine Estate	The Eighth Maker Shiraz 2002
2002	Rosemount Estate	Traditional 2001
2001	Pepper Tree Wines	Reserve Coonawarra Cabernet Sauvignon 2000
2000	Punter's Corner	Spartacus Shiraz 1999
1999	Wolf Blass Wines	Black Label Cabernet Sauvignon 1998
1998	Katnook Estate	Katnook Estate Shiraz 1997
1997	Gulf Station Vineyards	De Bortoli Wines Yarra Valley Reserve Shiraz 1996
1996	Hardy's Tintara	Eileen Hardy Shiraz 1995
1995	Hardy's Tintara	Leasingham Classic Clare Shiraz 1994
1994	Rouge Homme Wines Pty Ltd	Richardson's Red Block Dry Red 1993
1993	Elderton Wines	Cabernet Sauvignon 1992
1992	B Seppelt & Sons Ltd	Harpers Range Cabernet/Malbec 1991
1991	Mitchelton Vintners Pty Ltd	Mitchelton Shiraz 1990
1990	Peter Lehmann Wines Pty Ltd	Show Reserve Shiraz 1989
1989	Haselgrove Wines Pty Ltd	Jamiesons Run Dry Red Shiraz 1988
1988	Hardy's Tintara	Hardy's Collection Series Cabernet Sauvignon 1987
1987	Riddoch Wines	Riddoch Estate Coonawarra Cabernet Shiraz 1986
1986	Lindeman's Wines Pty Ltd	Coonawarra Pyrus Premium Claret Blend 1985
1985	Hollick Wines	Coonawarra Cabernet Sauvignon 1984
1984	Cape Mentelle Vineyards	Cabernet Dry Red Claret 1983
1983	Cape Mentelle Vineyards	Cabernet Dry Red Claret 1982
1982	Hamilton's Ewell Vineyards	Mildara JW Classic Coonawarra Cabernet Shiraz 1981
1981	Lindemans Wines Pty Ltd	St George Cabernet Sauvignon 1980
1980	Krondorf Wines Pty Ltd	Cabernet Sauvignon 1979
1979	Orlando Wines	Cabernet Sauvignon Dry Red Claret 1978
1978	Miller's Chateau Yarrinya	Dry Red Claret 1977
1977	Wynns Coonawarra Estate	Cabernet Sauvignon 1976
1976	Wolf Blass Wines	Black Label Dry Red Claret 1975
1975	Wolf Blass Wines	Black Label Dry Red Claret 1974
1974	Wolf Blass Wines	Black Label Dry Red Claret 1973
1973	Berri Co-op Winery & Distillery	Cabernet Shiraz Dry Red 1972
1972	B Seppelt & Sons Ltd	Cabernet Sauvignon TTI 47 1971
1971	Gramps Orlando	Barossa Valley Shiraz Cabernet Sauvignon Dry Red Claret 1970
1970	Basedow Wines	Bin 15 Dry Red Cabernet Sauvignon 1969
1969	F E Osborn & Sons Pty Ltd:	d'Arenberg Cabernet Sauvignon 1968
1968	Penfolds	Claret Type (Grange) 1967
1967	Saltram Wines	(Cabernet component of Saltram Mamre Brook Cabernet Shiraz) Burgundy Type 1966
1966	Penfolds	Claret Type (Grange) 1965
1965	B Seppelt & Sons Ltd	Seppelt Great Western Shiraz 1964
1964	Penfolds	Bin 64 Kalimna Cabernet Sauvignon Claret Type 1963
1963	Hardy's Tintara	Reserve Bin C404 Cabernet Sauvignon 1962
1962	Stoneyfell Wines	Metala Cabernet Shiraz Claret Type 1961
