= Smithbrook Wines =

Australian winery

- Location: Smith Brook Road, Middlesex WA 6260, Australia
- Coordinates: 34°21′25″S 116°10′24″E
- Wine region: Pemberton
- Founded: 1988
- Key people: Peter and Lee Fogarty, owners
- Tasting: By appointment
- Website: Smithbrook Wines

Smithbrook Wines is an Australian winery at Middlesex, in the Pemberton wine region of Western Australia. Established in 1988, it has been owned since 2009 by Peter and Lee Fogarty, who also own several other wineries.

== See also ==
- Australian wine
- List of wineries in Western Australia
- Western Australian wine
