= Moss Wood =

Winery in Western Australia

- Location: Metricup Road, Wilyabrup WA 6280, Australia
- Coordinates: 33°47′04″S 115°02′09″E
- Wine region: Margaret River
- Founded: 1969
- First vines planted: 1969
- Key people: Clare and Keith Mugford, proprietors
- Known for: Moss Wood Cabernet Sauvignon
- Varietals: Chardonnay, Cabernet Sauvignon, Malbec, Merlot, Petit Verdot, Pinot noir, Sauvignon blanc, Semillon
- Distribution: International
- Tasting: By appointment
- Website: Moss Wood

Moss Wood is an Australian winery based at Wilyabrup, in the Margaret River wine region of Western Australia. It is widely regarded as one of the best estates in the region.

== History ==
The first vines were planted at Moss Wood by obstetrician Dr Bill Pannell and his wife Sandra. The Pannells picked, pressed and bottled the early harvests by hand. Sandra Pannell tended vines and carted cases of wine to the railhead. Bill Pannell pruned and harvested, sometimes by moonlight.

The 1975 vintage was a major success. Bill Pannell later described the Cabernet Sauvignon 1975 as "a little miracle".

== See also ==
- Australian wine
- List of wineries in Western Australia
- Western Australian wine
