= Coorinja Vineyard =

Australian winery

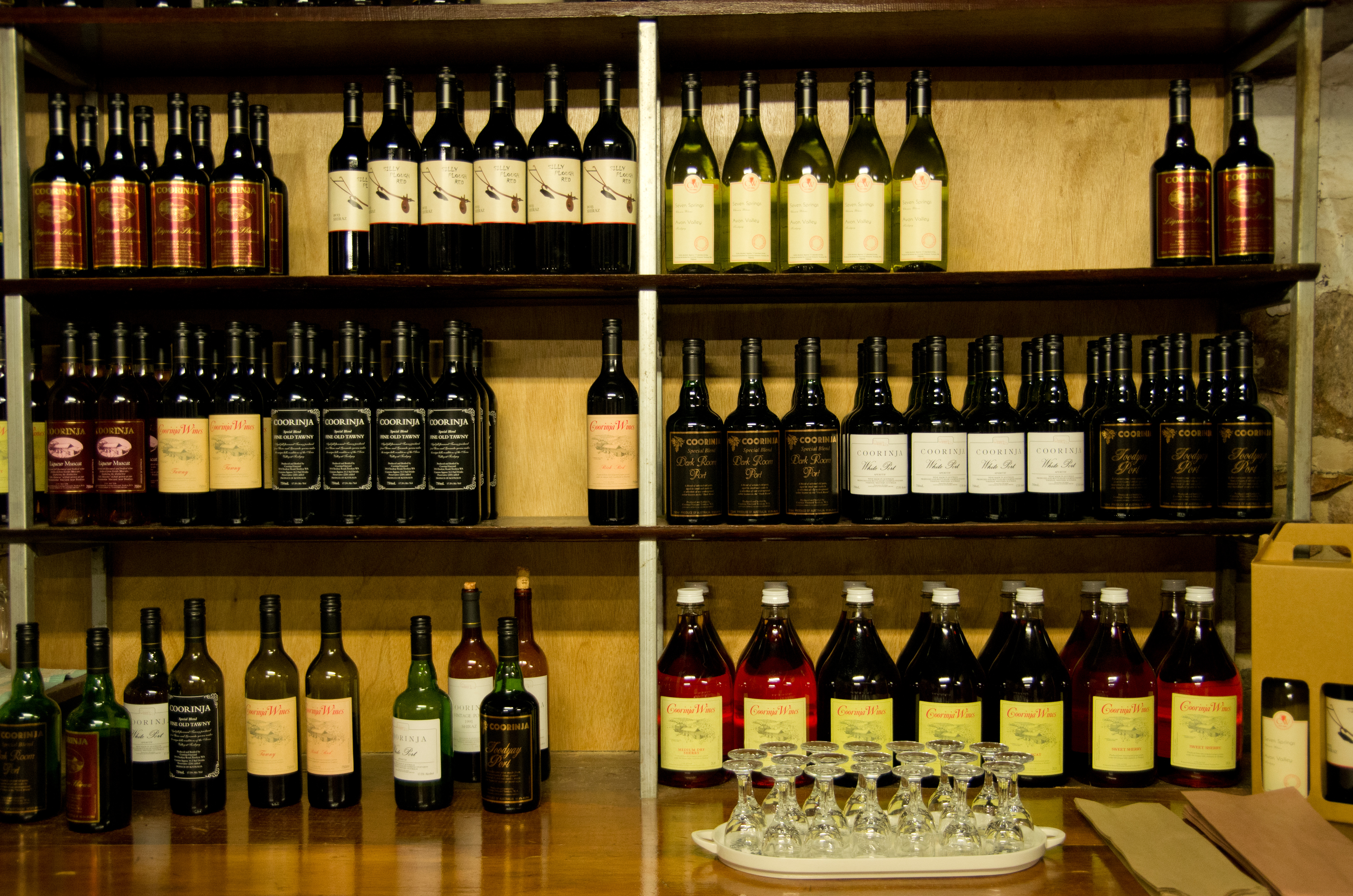
- Location: 5989 Toodyay Road, Toodyay WA 6566, Australia
- Coordinates: 31°36′00″S 116°28′34″E
- Wine region: Central Western Australia zone
- Founded: 1889
- Key people: Wood family, owners; Michael Wood, winemaker
- Known for: Shiraz
- Varietals: Chenin blanc, Gordo muscat, Grenache, Shiraz
- Distribution: Local
- Tasting: Open to public

Coorinja Vineyard or Coorinja Winery is an Australian winery at Coorinja (previously known as Seven Springs), 5 kilometres (3.1 mi) south of Toodyay, Western Australia, in the Central Western Australia wine zone. It was established in 1889 by Harry Fryer Smith, Henry Page Woodward, and John Leslie Sinclair, with 32 planted acres (13 ha) in pinot noir and shiraz. Sinclair left the partnership in 1890. Coorinja Vineyard Company was trademarked in 1893. It is one of the oldest extant vineyards in the state. The name is an Aboriginal word believed to mean "place of the seven springs".

The winery was described as "a fortified haven" by Michael Zekulich, former wine writer for The West Australian. Coorinja produces table and fortified wines including shiraz, grenache, cabernet-shiraz, port, sherry, muscat, liqueur muscat, ginger wine and marsala.

The Coorinja vineyard has been owned by the Wood family since 1919. The family also runs a cropping and sheep operation on the property.

== See also ==
- Australian wine
- List of wineries in Western Australia
- Western Australian wine
