= Houghton Wines =

Winery in Western Australia

- Location: Western Australia, Australia
- Coordinates: 31°51′15″S 115°59′56″E
- Wine region: Margaret River, Mount Barker, Frankland River, Pemberton
- Other labels: Crofters, Moondah Brook
- First vintage: 1859
- Key people: Courtney Treacher, winemaker / manager
- Parent company: Accolade Wines
- Known for: Houghton White Classic
- Varietals: Shiraz, Cabernet Sauvignon, Chardonnay, Verdelho, Sauvignon blanc, Sémillon, Chenin blanc, Riesling, Merlot
- Other attractions: café, picnic grounds, concerts and art gallery
- Website: Houghton Wines

Houghton Wines is an Australian winery originating in the Swan Valley wine region of Western Australia at the historic Houghton Estate.

A subsidiary of Accolade Wines, the company operates four of Western Australia's largest vineyards at Moondah Brook (145 hectares), Pemberton (92 hectares), Mount Barker (74 hectares), and Frankland River (89 hectares), and sources fruit from Margaret River, Harvey and the Ferguson Valley. Expansion into the Western Australian South West and the Great Southern wine region led to the establishment of a winery, located at Nannup in the Blackwood Valley. In 2019 Houghton divested itself of its wine-producing facilities and vineyards in the Swan Valley, with the Swan Valley location now known as Nikola Estate.

The Houghton portfolio includes the brands of Houghton Line Range, Houghton Crofters, Moondah Brook, Houghton Regional Range, Houghton Gladstone, and Jack Mann.

== History ==
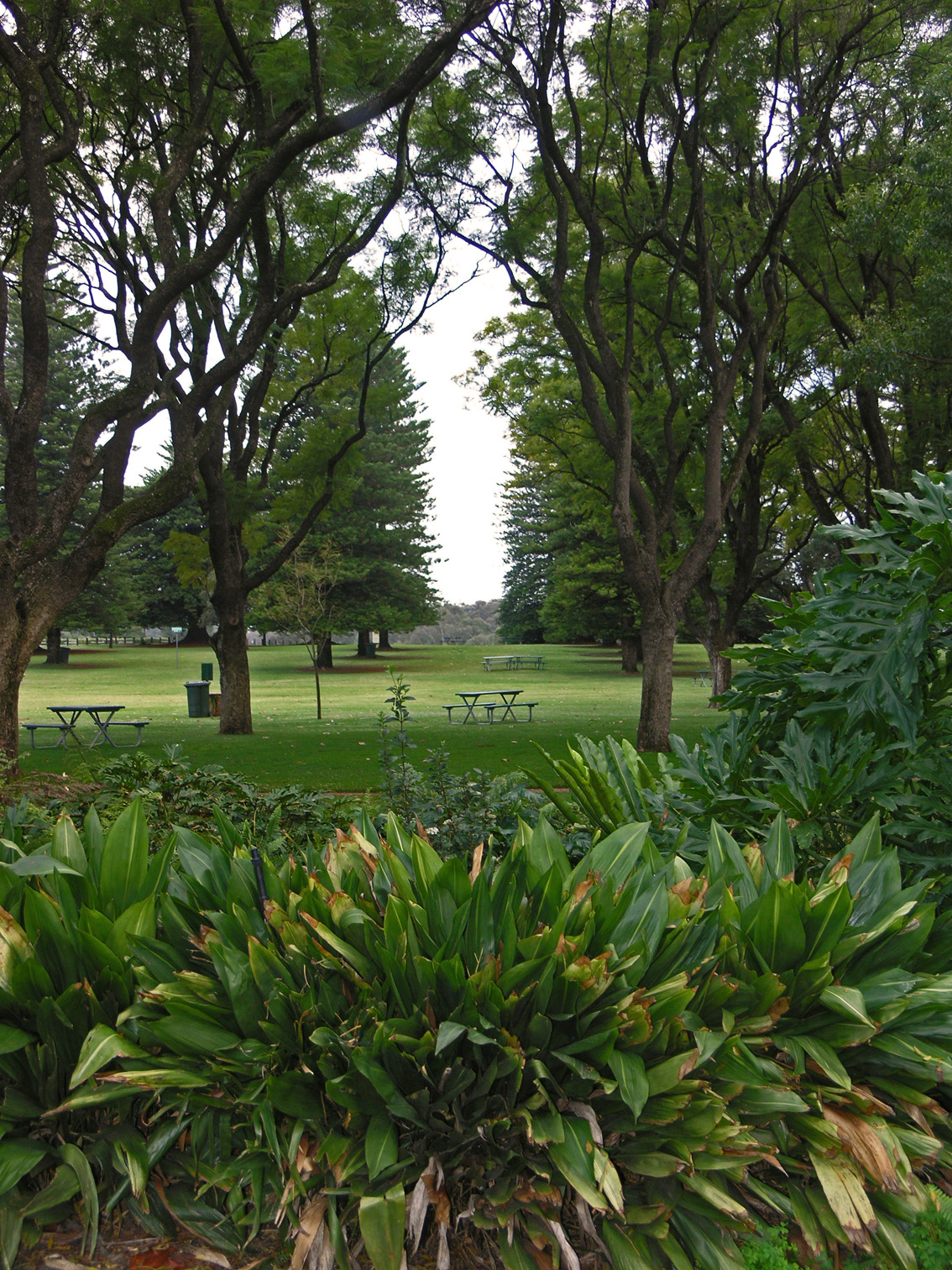
Part of the grounds belonging to Houghton Winery.

The land of which Houghton was part (Swan Location II) was originally 1000 acres (405 ha) assigned by Governor James Stirling to Rivett Henry Bland in 1831. In 1836, a syndicate of three British Army Officers, Houghton, Lowie, and Yule (who had been serving together in India) purchased the northern half of Swan location II. The syndicate named the property Houghton after the senior ranking officer of their group, Lieutenant Colonel Richmond Houghton.

Houghton himself did not come to Western Australia and for the next 23 years, the property was managed and developed by one of the members of the syndicate, Thomas Newte Yule.

In 1859, Dr. John Ferguson purchased the Houghton property for the sum of 350 pounds and in that same year produced the first commercial vintage of wine from the vineyard a total of 25 imperial gallons (110 L).

Moondyne Joe, Western Australia's most famous bushranger, was captured on the Houghton property in the act of stealing wine from the cellars on 25 February 1869. By chance, the owner, Charles William Ferguson had been helping with a police search and afterward invited a group of police back to the vineyard for refreshments. When Ferguson entered the cellar, Joe assumed that he was discovered, and dashed the door into the arms of the police.

In 1950, Valencia Vineyards, a subsidiary of the Emu Wine Company of Morphett Vale, South Australia, purchased the Houghton vineyards, winery, and distillery from the Ferguson family. In April 1976, the South Australian winemaking Hardy family acquired the stock of the Emu Wine Company and with that purchase, became owners of Houghton.

== Jack Mann and Houghton White Burgundy ==
Jack Mann (1906–1989) was considered a pioneer of Western Australia's wine industry. and served a total of 51 consecutive vintages at Houghton. His awards included being awarded an MBE in 1964. The West Australian newspaper included him in their list of Western Australia's 100 most influential people.

One of Mann's most significant accomplishments was the creation of the Houghton White Burgundy in 1937, a full-bodied chenin blanc wine. The Houghton White Burgundy was so named because the judges and winemakers at the 1937 Melbourne Wine Show likened it to the style of wines from Burgundy, France. The Houghton White Burgundy has become one of Australia's most popular white wines, in some years in the 1980s & 1990’s it was, in fact the largest-selling wine in Australia, and known for being on almost every wine list. During this period it was known over half the grapes crushed in Western Australia went into Houghton White Burgundy. One feature of this era was the Houghton Show White Burgundy, just over 500 cases were selected by the winemakers from each vintage, aged for 5 years, it won countless Trophies and Gold medals and was released with a special label for about 3 times the price of the 1-year-old regular wine. Houghton White Burgundy was renamed Houghton White Classic in 2005 to comply with an international trade agreement between Australia and the EU (see Protected designation of origin).

== See also ==
- List of wineries in Western Australia
- Western Australian wine
