= Hector Thomas Wood =

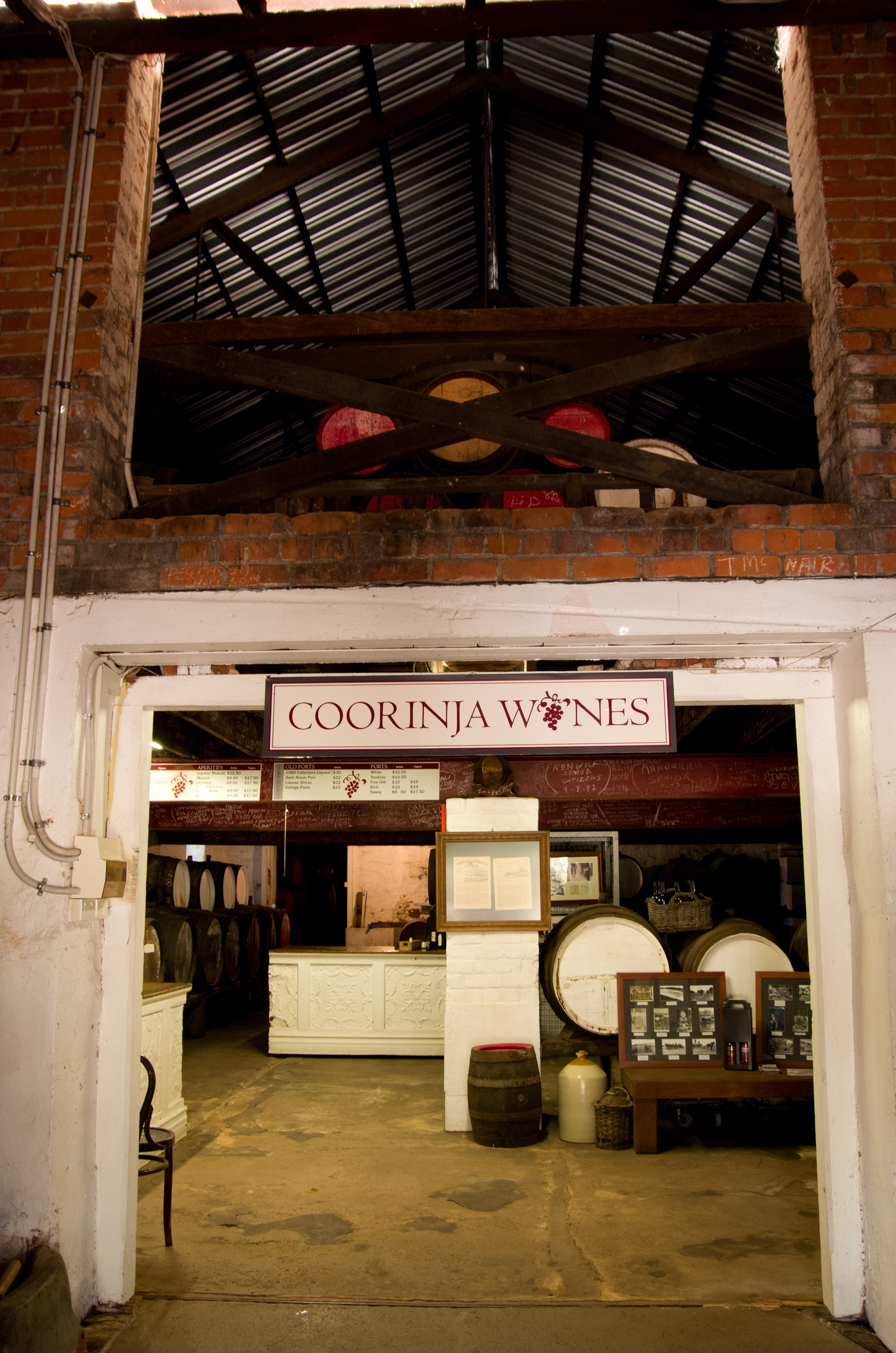
Coorinja Wines Cellar

Hector Thomas Wood (1926–2011) was vigneron (a specialist in cultivating vineyards for the manufacture of wine) who was born in Toodyay Western Australia.

The Wood family name has been associated with Toodyay's historic Coorinja Winery (also referred to as Coorinja Vineyard) for almost a century. Coorinja is said to be a Ballardong name for the place of seven springs. It was these springs that made Coorinja such a productive farming property since it was established in the 19th century. Hector Wood's grandfather William Thomas Wood bought the property and winery in 1919 and since then each generation has continued the wine growing and sheep farming business.^1

Hector Wood was born on 25 October 1926 at the Newcastle Hospital in Henry Street to parents Horace and Lily Wood. He was one of three children, with an older brother Doug and sister Jean May, and attended the local school in Duke Street. By this time the single teacher schools had been closed down and consolidated into the one state school, Toodyay being the first consolidated school in the state. Hector walked two miles to the pick-up point at Lloyds Crossing to catch the Irishtown school bus, nicknamed "the chicken bus" because of the boards and netting on the sides. The school was also the first experimental school where children were taught life skills appropriate to their farming backgrounds. Hector recalls planting clover and various grain crops and looking after the school orchard and vineyard. They were taught how to dry fruit, and the girls learnt bottling and making preserves. They were also taught social skills such as dancing to the beat of a kerosene can. Hector's mother said she could hear the noise all the way to Coorinja.

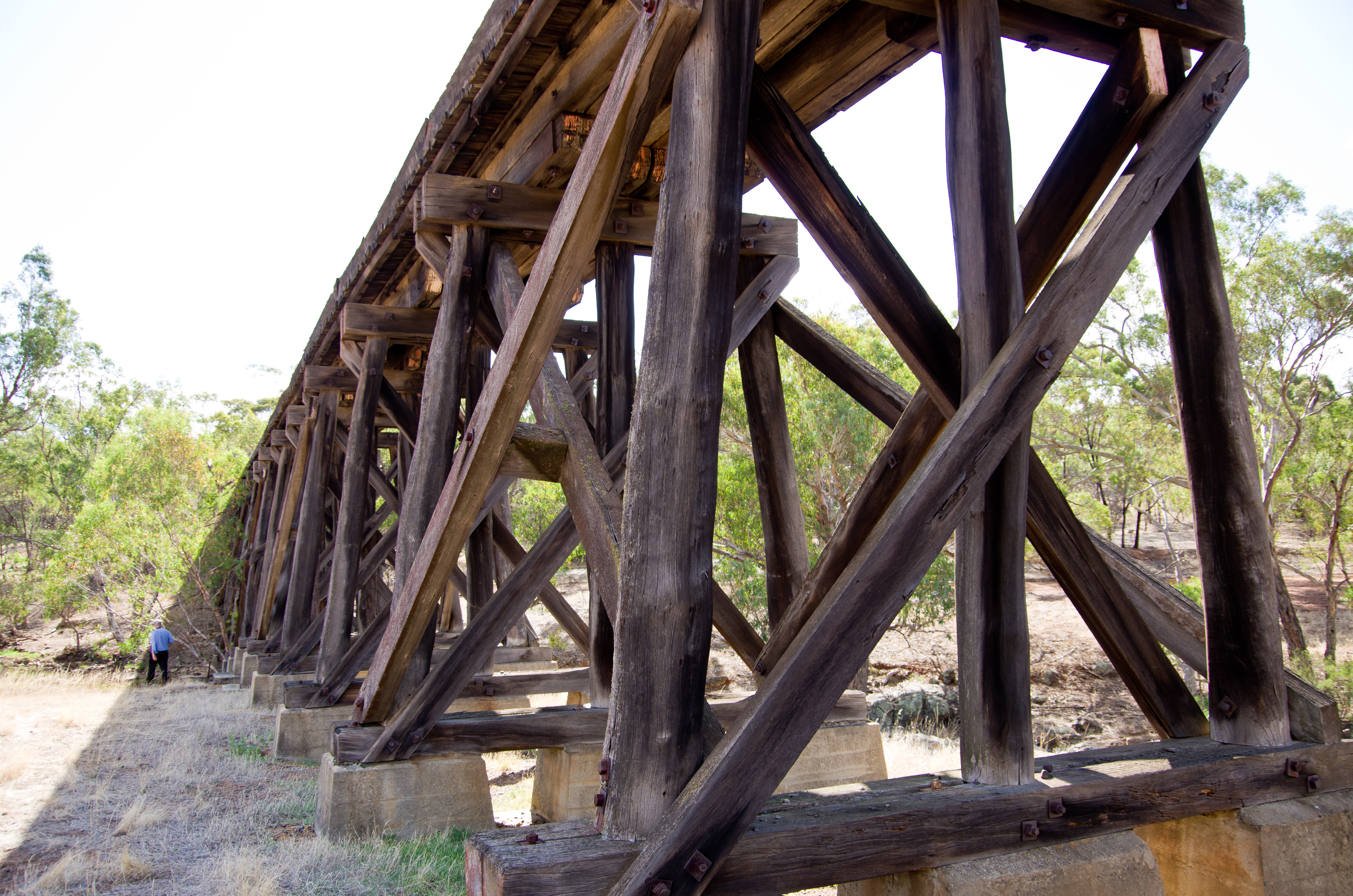
Ringa Bridge

Hector and his friends kept themselves amused during school holidays with pranks such as lobbing a pomegranate into the funnel of the steam train that went through the Coorinja property. The fireman returned fire with apples. The railway had been opened in January 1888 and ran from Clackline Junction to Newcastle, renamed Toodyay in 1910, with seven stations or sidings for the farms including Coorinja. The line, and spur lines, provided a useful service by carting produce, delivering mail, and carrying passengers between Toodyay and Perth. At the Coorinja siding, called "Ringa", kegs of wine were picked up and transported throughout Western Australia. The heritage-listed Coorinja Railway Bridge (or Ringa Bridge), constructed across Harper's Brook that runs through Coorinja, remains as a reminder of the old railway line that closed in February 1966. A more practical and rewarding past time for Hector and his mates was the shooting of ring-neck parrots, called "28s". The parrots were a menace for orchardists and the Shire paid a penny a head. They also shot rabbits, and joined the trappers who did this for a living. The carcasses were sent to Perth in a freezer truck where they were sold for meat and pelts. As a small child Hector recalls the swagmen who called into Coorinja during the years of the Depression. A number of men passed through Toodyay on their way to the goldfields hoping to reverse their fortunes. "These men always carried a pair of secateurs and a file as a visible means of support otherwise they would be arrested as vagrants. They would stop at Coorinja asking for work and a meal as payment."

In 1941 Hector attended Wesley College but had to leave the following year when his older brother Doug enlisted. Hector was needed at home. He was only 15 but was required to do a man's job tending the vineyards, clearing land and grubbing out the notorious York Road poison plant (Gastrolobium calycinum). He learnt valuable skills from his father about how to handle stock and everything to do with managing the winery. However life during the war years was not all hard work. Hector and his friends enjoyed the dances and concerts that were put on to entertain the enlisted men who were stationed at Toodyay, such as the Victorian Signalmen who were camped nearby at the Toodyay racecourse.

On 30 April 1949, Hector married Jocelyn (Joy) Pearce who lived in Perth. They met when Joy came to Toodyay with a friend for a holiday at the nearby Key Farm guesthouse. Hector and Joy had four children, three daughters, Julie, Elizabeth and Virginia, and a son Michael who now runs Coorinja.^2 The years following the war were remembered as wonderful times with many social and sporting activities. There were usually four major balls during the year, and most people belonged to a sporting club. Hector played cricket (with his left hand though he was right-handed), football and badminton and became a life member of the Toodyay Tennis Club. When he was 17 he became a member of the St Stephen's Church Vestry. His commitment to the church was lifelong. He also became a member of the Junior Farmers Club when it was formed during the War, and the Farmers’ Union. He was a member of the Toodyay Agricultural Society, serving on the committee, and being a Steward for many years, as well as the Society's Patron. Apart from winemaking, Hector had a keen interest in breeding rams for high-quality wool. Under Hector's management Coorinja continued to flourish as a winery with a reputation for its fine table and dessert wines. Hector also had a keen interest in the natural environment and reminisced about the plentiful wildflowers and native fauna before the serious depredations of rabbits and feral animals. "There was a time when the orchids would come up to my knees and you would always see cowslip, red spider and donkey orchids…not nowadays."

In 1979 Hector and his contemporary Wally Chitty (1919-2008), who owned the Moscow Farm property, made a submission to the "System 6 Study" on behalf of the Toodyay Council. The Study was set up by the Environmental Protection Authority to identify a comprehensive and representative set of reserves to help conserve the State's flora and fauna. "We recommended that a green belt should be maintained from the freshwater swamps on the Red Hill Road to the Avon River near Bald Hill." Hector and Wally became Wardens of the Shire's Goonaring Spring and Beelaring Spring Nature Reserves, that now form part of Morangup Nature Reserve.
