= Jack Mann (winemaker) =

Australian winemaker

Jack Mann MBE
- Born: 19 March 1906; Perth, Western Australia, Australia
- Died: 26 May 1989 (aged 83); Middle Swan, Western Australia
- Occupation: Winemaker
- Years active: 1922–1972
- Employer: Houghton Wines
- Known for: Houghton White Burgundy

Jack Mann MBE (19 March 1906 – 26 May 1989) was a winemaker in Western Australia and devised Houghton White Burgundy, a wine that became the flagship of the Western Australian wine industry. He was chief winemaker at Houghton Winery in the Swan Valley, from 1930 to 1972 and is considered one of the pioneers of the Western Australian wine industry.

== Early life ==
Mann was born in Perth. His father George was a well-known brandy maker from Chateau Tanunda winery in South Australia's Barossa Valley and his mother was a member of the Sobels winemaking family.

== Career ==
Mann started work at Houghton's with his father George in 1922. He succeeded his father as chief winemaker eight years later. In the 1930s his oloroso won the first of 13 successive Australian Champion awards. In 1932 Mann introduced a butcher's mincing machine which fragmented grape skins, but not the seeds, after the stalks had been separated from the bunches. In 1936 he acquired a Seitz germ proof filter, the first to be imported into Australia, which allowed sterile filtration. The next year Chenin blanc won first prize at the Melbourne Wine Show, and Houghton White Burgundy was born. During his career he won many awards for claret, burgundy, tawny port, vintage port, liqueur frontignac and liqueur hermitage. He was awarded an MBE in 1964 for services to the viticulture industry and The West Australian newspaper included him in their list of Western Australia's 100 most influential people in 2006.

== Sport ==
Jack Mann was a noted cricketer and successful underarm bowler: he took over 2000 wickets in WA grade cricket including 81 in the 1927/28 season. The Jack Mann Oval in Middle Swan is named for him.

== Personal life and family ==
In 1938, Mann married Angela Doolette. He had three sons and a daughter. He died on 26 May 1989 at his Middle Swan home.

Lamont's winery in the Swan Valley was founded by Jack's daughter and son-in-law Corin and Neil Lamont. His son, Tony Mann represented Australia in four cricket test matches and was the first Australian to score a test century as a nightwatchman. His son, Dorham Mann also operates a small winery at Upper Swan producing a method champenoise sparkling wine made from cabernet sauvignon grapes.

His granddaughter Kate Lamont is a noted cook and businesswoman. His grandson, Robert Mann, is the Estate Director at Newton Vineyard in Napa Valley, California. Robert Mann also makes wine from his family's vineyard in the Swan Valley, Western Australia under the label Corymbia.
