= Lake Nunijup =

Salt lake in Western Australia

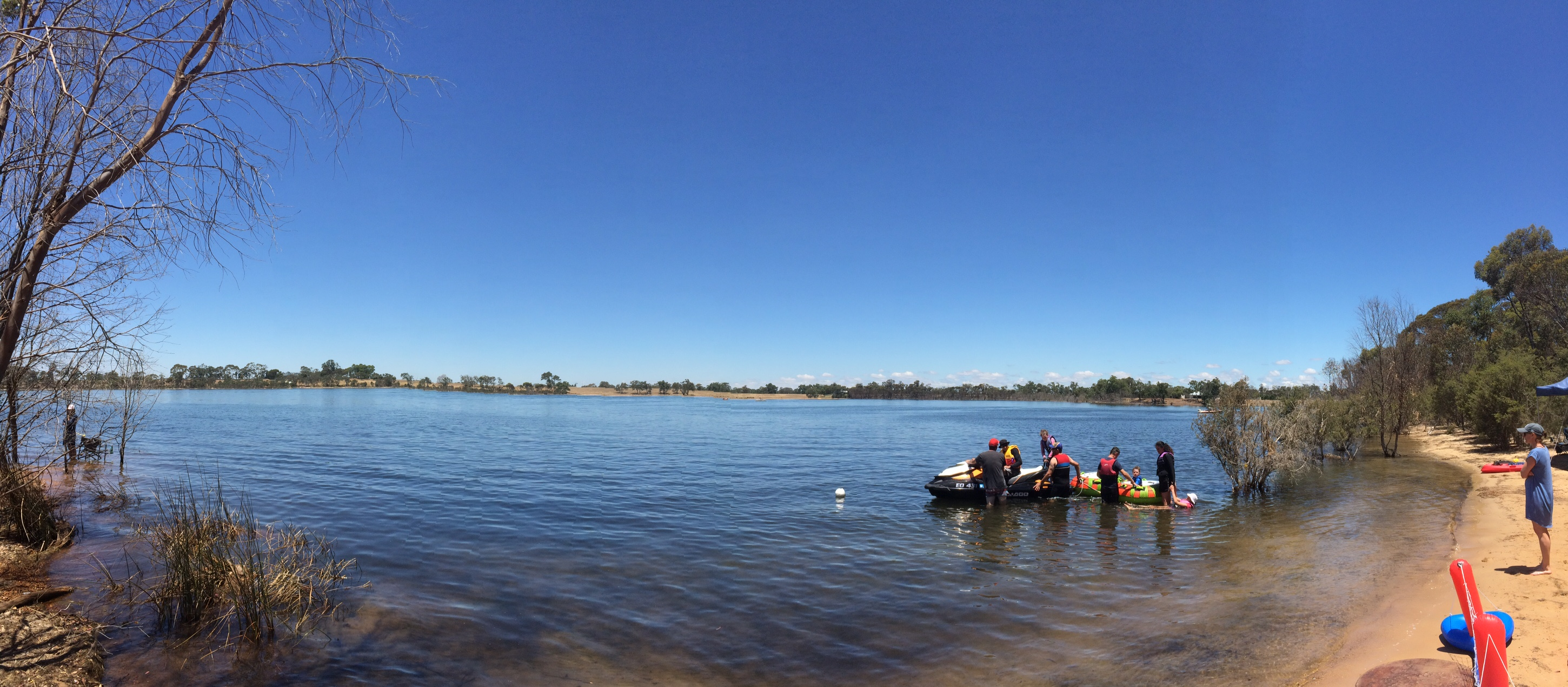
- Lake Nunijup December 2018

- Location in Western Australia
- Interactive map of Lake Nunijup
- Location: Western Australia
- Coordinates: 34°24′24″S 117°24′33″E
- Type: saline
- Catchment area: 330 ha (820 acres)
- Basin countries: Australia
- Max. length: 980 m (3,220 ft)
- Max. width: 900 m (3,000 ft)
- Surface area: 76 ha (190 acres)
- Average depth: 4.4 m (14 ft) (during overflow)
- Shore length^{1}: 3,600 m (11,800 ft)
- Islands: none
- ^{1} Shore length is not a well-defined measure.

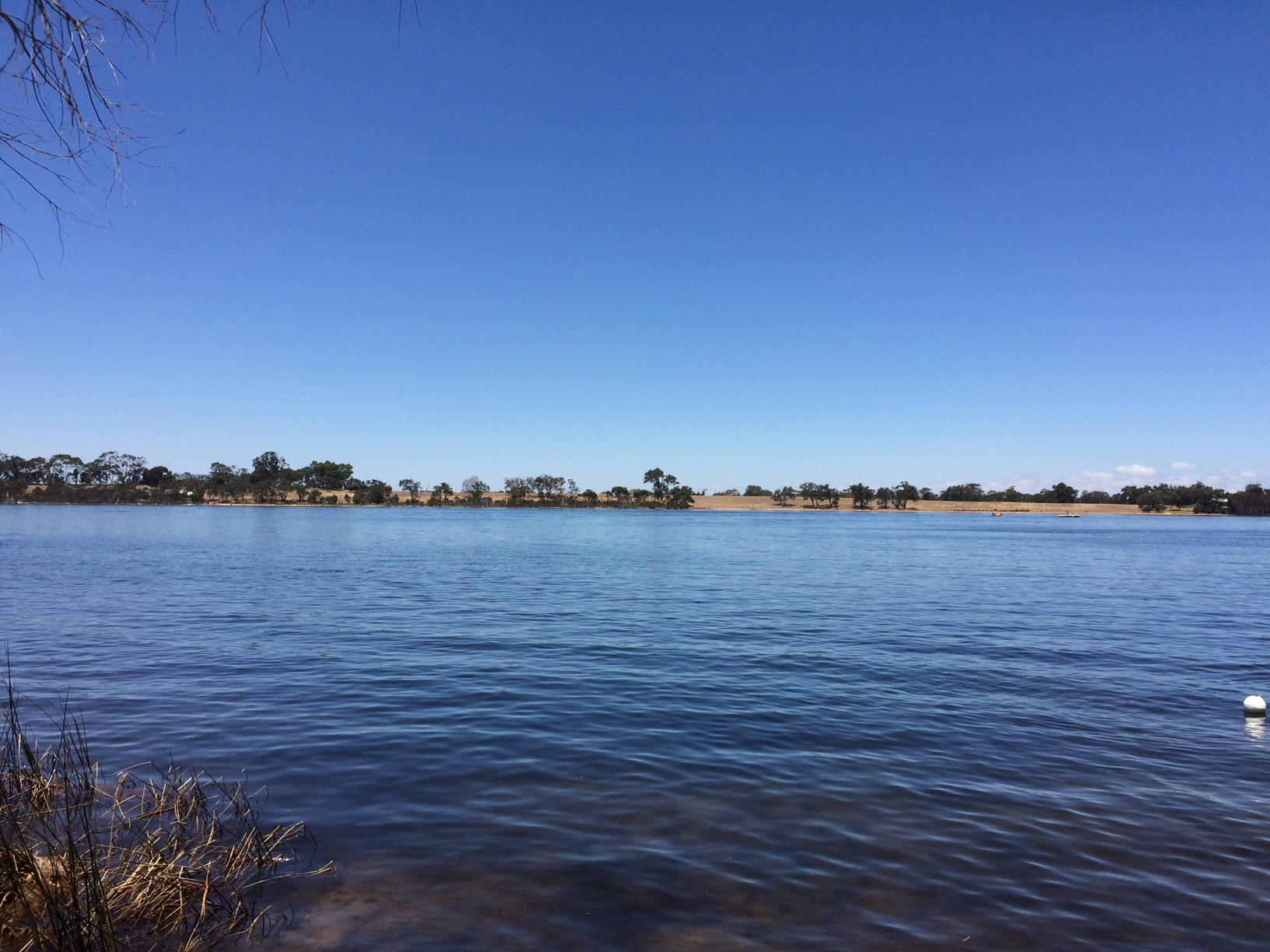
Eastern shore of Lake Nunijup

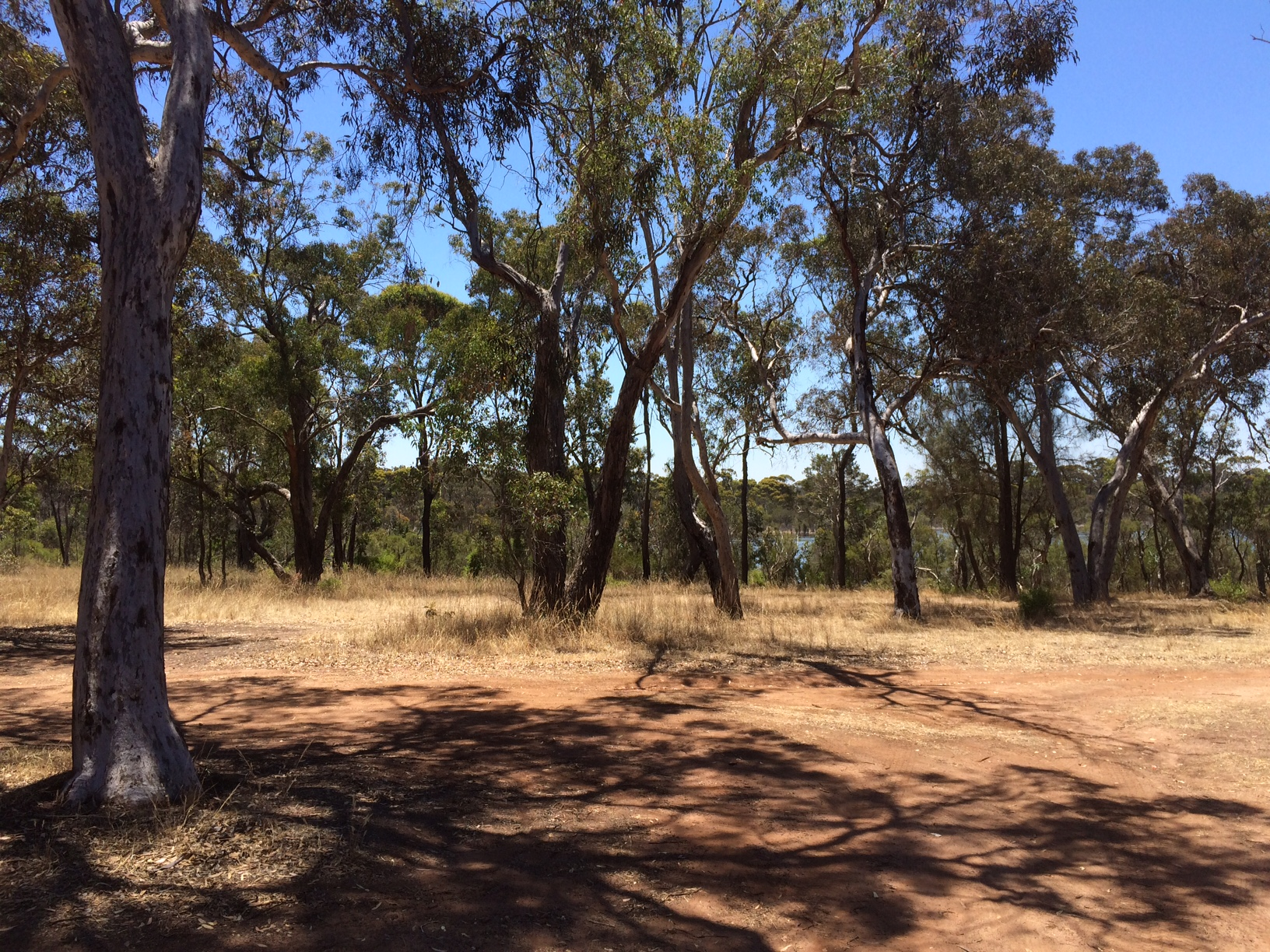
Lake Nunijup fringing vegetation

Lake Nunijup is an ephemeral salt lake in the Great Southern region of Western Australia, approximately 27 km (17 mi) south west of Cranbrook and 41 km (25 mi) north west of Mount Barker.

== Description ==
The lake is part of the Bow River sub-catchment and the Kent River catchment. The surrounding landscape is composed of lakes and swamps with lunettes situated over tertiary alluvium, colluvium and sand with underlying laterite also present. Quaternary swamp and lake deposits are also found within the Frankland district. Small amounts of brackish water can be received from the south western flanks of the Stirling Range that can flow into the lake. The area receives around 499 mm (19.6 in) of rainfall per annum and loses around 1,650 mm (65 in) from evaporation. The annual inflow to the lake between 1973 and 2001 was 0.72 GL (25,000,000 cu ft), of which about 70% evaporated and 26% seeped through the sandy-gravelly lake bed. The lake has a capacity of 2.32 GL (82,000,000 cu ft) and an overflow depth of up to 4.4 m (14 ft), and is on an unallocated crown land reserve. The lake and wetlands is situated in a wetland vegetation buffer zone that is unfenced and ranges from 0 to 95 m (0 to 312 ft) in width.

== History ==
The traditional owners of the area are the Noongar peoples, who have inhabited the region for tens of thousands of years. The name Nunijup means place of the snakes.

Land around the lake was first permanently settled by J.B.Parsons, who arrived in 1882 and selected an area of over 4,000 acres (1,600 ha), including part of the lake's shore. Parsons cleared much of the land all the way to the shoreline, and farmed sheep; he was still on the property in 1929.

In 1940 it was proposed that water from the lake could be used as part of the region's water supply and could be pumped to Lake Matilda near Kendenup where a pumping station already existed. The levels of Lake Matilda were low at the time.

The lake was once freshwater but became saline during the 1960s as a result of deforestation within the catchment area and lower rainfall.

The lake is mostly permanent and once overflowed in 1982. The median salinity over the past two decades has been 8000 mg/L.

The lake is used for swimming, and has a parking area and barbeque facilities available.

== Flora ==
The natural vegetation within the catchment area is jarrah forest (Eucalyptus marginata) and mixed jarrah, wandoo, and swamp yate open woodlands with wide swampy drainage lines that have paperbark (species of Melaleuca) and banksia woodlands and sedge swamps, while sandy flats surrounding them have a low-density mix of jarrah, marri (Eucalyptus calophylla), wandoo (Eucalyptus wandoo) and swamp yate (Eucalyptus occidentalis). Most of the catchment has been cleared for agricultural development. Around the lake the overstorey is dominated by Eucalyptus wandoo while the mid-storey contains Melaleuca cuticularis with a sparse understorey of Baumea juncea. A seagrass, Ruppia megacarpa, and species of stoneworts of the genus Nitella are also common in the wetlands.

== Fauna ==
Some species of bird that have been observed at the lake include Australian shelduck, blue-billed duck, hoary-headed grebe, great crested grebe, musk duck, little black cormorant, great egret and silver gull.

== See also ==
- List of lakes of Australia § Western Australia
