= Great Southern (wine region) =

Wine region in Western Australia

Coordinates: 35°S 117°E

- Wine region
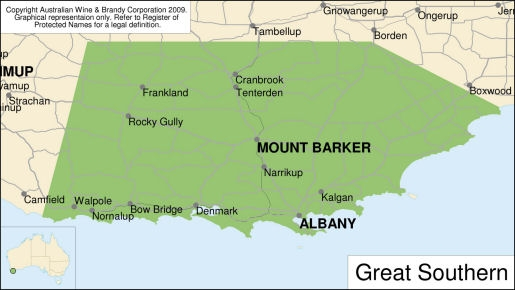
- The largest Geographical indication (GI) wine region of Australia
- Country: Australia
- Sub-regions: Porongurups, Mount Barker, Albany, Denmark and Frankland River
- Soil conditions: The main soils are similar to that of the Margaret River (wine region); lateritic gravelly sandy loams (marri country) or sandy loams from granite and gneissic bedrocks. Typically brown to grey-brown in colour, with the percentage of clay varying from one location to another.
- Size of planted vineyards: 5,775 acres (23 km^{2})
- Varietals produced: Riesling, Chardonnay, Cabernet Sauvignon, Pinot Noir, Shiraz, Merlot, Malbec, Cabernet Franc and Verdelho.
- No. of wineries: 48

The Great Southern wine region is in Western Australia's Great Southern region. It comprises an area 200 kilometres (120 mi) from east to west and over 100 kilometres (62 mi) from north to south, and is Australia's largest wine region.

It has five nominated subregions for wine, the Porongurups, Mount Barker, Albany, Denmark and Frankland River under the geographical indications legislation as determined by Wine Australia (formerly Australian Wine and Brandy Corporation). The vineyards spread throughout the area, known for production of high quality vines, have significant variations of terroir and climate dictated in part by the distance. However, the region is the coolest of Western Australia's viticultural areas, with a similar maritime influenced Mediterranean climate to Margaret River although with slightly less rainfall. This region is known for Riesling, Chardonnay, Cabernet Sauvignon, Pinot Noir, Shiraz, and Malbec.

== Subregions ==
=== Albany ===
Albany's climate is maritime, strongly shaped and moderated by the Southern Ocean; the standard description is that it is Mediterranean, with moist, cool winters and warm, dry summers. Diurnal temperature range is minimal, and moderate humidity in summer assists ripening by reducing stress on the vines. Soil types of the region are either lateritic gravelly sandy loams, or sandy loams derived directly from granite and gneissic rocks.

=== Denmark ===
Albany's coastal neighbour, Denmark, is marginally wetter and cooler, although the differences are not of significant magnitude. The climate is broadly similar to Albany; the varieties being grown and the wine styles are also similar.

=== Frankland River ===
Frankland River is situated in the northwestern corner of the region, its western boundary touching the eastern side of Manjimup. It is the most northerly, inland subregion of Great Southern, still Mediterranean in terms of dominant winter-spring rainfall, but with greater continentality. The soils are chiefly derived from lateritic gravelly sandy loams, or sandy loams derived from granite, or gneissic rocks, and so are typically rich, red in colour and of uniform depth, with some areas carrying marri and karri loams. The climatic influences for the area favor medium-bodied, Bordeaux style red varieties, and with the excellent adaptation of slightly earlier-maturing Shiraz.

=== Mount Barker ===
Mount Barker is generally regarded as the most important subregion of the Great Southern. Ripening month and average temperatures in the established Mount Barker vineyards are significantly lower than in the Médoc, and significantly lower than in the lower warmer Bordeaux appellations such as Saint Emilion and Pomerol. The average ripening period sunshine hours at Mount Barker together with the whole season measure of sunshine hours are nearly identical with those of Bordeaux. Situated in the middle of the Great Southern, with strong continental aspects together with marri soils and lateritic gravely and sandy loams provided from the granite rock backdrop, the region is suited to Riesling, Shiraz, Cabernet Sauvignon, and Pinot noir.

=== Porongurup ===
The Porongorups are a small, isolated range of intrusive granite, whose slopes enjoy outstanding air drainage. The Porongorups ranges have one of the richest concentrations of plant species worldwide and are one of only 34 internationally significant hotspots for biodiversity. The Porongurup range is one of the oldest mountain ranges in the world, dating roughly around 1.1 to 1.4 billion years old which places its formation in the Proterozoic Eon. It owes its formation to the massive tectonic forces that have shaped the southern and western coasts of Australia, a likely result of a collision between the Australian and Antarctic landmasses. The climate is Mediterranean with cool to mild winters and warm, sunny summers. While conditions are cooler and more humid higher up in the ranges with occasional snow on the taller peaks for short periods during winter and spring. The soils are ancient, deep karri loams derived from weathered granite. Porongurup is strongly indicated for all high quality white wine varieties such as Riesling, Traminer, Chardonnay, and red wine varieties such as Pinot noir, and Pinot Meunier.

== History ==
The international definition and recognition of this area as a distinct and unique wine growing area goes back to 1859, when original settler George Egerton-Warburton planted vines on his St Werburgh's property near Mount Barker and bottled his first vintage two years later. However, the first real commercial foundations were laid in the late 1930s by horticulturalist Bill Jamieson. His extensive knowledge of the area's soils and climate was augmented by the research of Californian Professor Harold Olmo in 1955 during a government-sponsored trip to Western Australia. Olmo spent eight months in Western Australia at the invitation of the Western Australian Vine Fruits Research Trust, while on leave from his post as Professor of Viticulture at the University of California. When he published his report in 1956, one of the recommendations put forward was that Mount Barker and the Frankland area of Western Australia showed great promise for making table wines in the light traditional European style. This was further backed up by agricultural and viticultural scientist Dr John Gladstones in 1963, and endorsed by the Western Australian Grape Industry Committee (1964). A year later, Jamieson and Houghton's celebrated winemaker Jack Mann, went to Mount Barker and the first experimental cuttings were planted in 1965 at Forest Hill.

== Wineries ==
Wineries include:

- Plantagenet Wines
- Forest Hill Wines
- Goundrey Wines
- Houghton Wines
- Castle Rock Estate
- 3 Drop Wines
- Castelli Estate
- Willoughby Park
- Singlefile Wines
- Ferngrove Wines
- Alkoomi Wines
- Frankland Estate
- West Cape Howe Wines

== In the media ==
- The Porongurup wine region was featured on the ABC Television programme Landline in the July 2010 episode "Great Southern Land".

== Sources ==
- Gladstones, John (2016). Viticulture and Environment (Revised ed.). Tanunda, South Australia: Trivinum Press. ISBN 978-0-9945016-1-5.
- Halliday, James (2009). The Australian Wine Encyclopedia. Prahran, Vic: Hardie Grant Books. ISBN 9781740667746.
- Robinson, J., ed. (2006). The Oxford Companion to Wine (3rd ed.). Oxford University Press. ISBN 0-19-860990-6.
