= Frankland River, Western Australia =

Frankland River
- Town
- Interactive map of Frankland River
- Coordinates: 34.36°S 117.08°E
- Country: Australia
- State: Western Australia
- LGA: Shire of Cranbrook
- Location: 360 km (220 mi) SE of Perth; 90 km (56 mi) E of Manjimup
- Established: 1947

Government
  - State electorate: Roe
  - Federal division: O'Connor

Area
  - Total: 1,391.9 km^{2} (537.4 sq mi)
- Elevation: 230 m (750 ft)

Population
  - Total: 353 (SAL 2021)
- Postcode: 6396
- Mean max temp: 21.1 °C (70.0 °F)
- Mean min temp: 9.4 °C (48.9 °F)
- Annual rainfall: 602 mm (23.7 in)

Frankland River is a small town and locality in the Shire of Cranbrook, Great Southern region of Western Australia. The town is situated approximately 332.7 km (206.7 mi) from the state's capital, Perth, approximately 120 km (75 mi) north west of Albany, 83 km (52 mi) southwest of Kojonup, 19 km (12 mi) north of Rocky Gully and 90 km (56 mi) east of Manjimup. Frankland derives its name from its location 6 km east of the Frankland River. At the 2006 census, Frankland had a population of 380.

== History ==
Frankland River was named by the surgeon Thomas Braidwood Wilson in 1829. Wilson, who was on his way to Sydney, left Albany to explore the hinterland while his ship, Governor Phillip, was being repaired. He named Frankland River and Mount Frankland after George Frankland (1800–38), who was the surveyor-general in Van Diemen's Land in 1829. Wilson's explorations helped to show that conditions in the interior were suitable for farming and settlers soon began to move inland. The area was settled in 1857.

The state government set aside land for the townsite by 1909 and built a hall and a school. No further developments took place for some time and the townsite was not declared until 1947.

The town and region were known as Frankland River until 1935. After the building of a local post office, the postmaster shortened the name to Frankland because "Frankland River" was considered too long to fit on signs and documents. In 2007 it was renamed Frankland River again.

Western Australia's first European settlement began at Albany in 1826. Gradually the pioneers set out to explore the hinterland, hoping to find areas that would be more suitable for pastoral and agricultural holdings than that of the land in the immediate vicinity of the first settlement. Originally settled by farming families in the late 19th century, following good reports from explorers to the region and due to its good soils, consistent, reliable rainfall, rivers and lakes, the land was cleared of its heavy wandoo, jarrah and marri to make way for pastures for grazing and arable land for cropping.

John Hassell, a retired sea captain, was responsible for opening up extensive areas in the south of the state during the 1850s. He owned large flocks of sheep, which needed the constant attention of shepherds, as the only fences in existence were post-and-rail. Many of the shepherds drove their flocks into the Frankland area, which has many small creeks surrounded by natural pasture that provided good feed in the autumn, winter and spring. The permanent waters of the Frankland and Gordon Rivers, and lakes such as Nunijup and Poorarecup also made the area attractive during summer. Gradually families followed the shepherds into the area, mainly looking for land. Frankland was one of the many districts to benefit from the completion of the Great Southern Railway in 1889. Although the line actually went through Cranbrook (47 km away) timber workers in the Frankland area were kept busy supplying railway sleepers for the line. Settlement of the district expanded when some of these men took up land in the area.

Frankland expanded with the influx of war veterans following World War II, mill workers, shearing teams, seasonal workers on local vineyards and olive groves, townsfolk, farmers and retirees.

== Education ==
Education in the town was formally undertaken by the appointment of a head teacher and, as there was no schoolhouse built, the first teacher was given a tent with instructions to erect it for himself to house him until further accommodation could be found. Schooling was conducted in the town hall before World War II. The current school has approximately 60-70 children enrolled. It supports kindergarten to year 6 students, with the last year 7s leaving in 2014.

== Wine region ==
Frankland River is one of the five subregions of the Great Southern wine region in Western Australia. It is situated in the northwestern corner of the region, its western boundary touching the eastern side of Manjimup.

== See also ==
- Great Southern (wine region)
