= James Halliday (writer) =

Australian wine critic and winemaker

James Halliday AM
- Born: 1938
- Education: University of Sydney
- Occupations: Lawyer, winemaker, wine judge, wine writer
- Notable work: James Halliday Annual Wine Companion

James Halliday AM (born 1938) is an Australian wine writer and critic, winemaker, and senior wine competition judge.

Since 1979 he has written and co-authored more than 40 books on wine, including contributions to the Larousse Encyclopedia of Wine and The Oxford Companion to Wine. Since 1986 he has published an annual overview of Australian wine which (since 2000) has been entitled James Halliday Annual Wine Companion.

Jancis Robinson has described Halliday as the protégé of Len Evans, and his successor "as Australia’s leading wine writer".

== Career ==
James Halliday studied law at the University of Sydney. He started his wine career while being a partner at Clayton Utz from 1966 to 1988 (with a break from 1974 to 1976 when he worked for a merchant bank). He established Brokenwood Wines in the Hunter Valley in 1970 with two legal colleagues. He sold it in 1983. In 1985 he founded the Coldstream Hills Winery in the Yarra Valley wine region. Coldstream Hills was acquired by Southcorp Wines in 1996 with Halliday taking on the position of Group Winemaker, Regional Wineries with Southcorp.

Halliday's career as a wine judge started in 1977 and he has been accorded the role of Chairman of Judges of the Victorian Wine Show, Sydney International Winemakers Competition, Adelaide Wine Show and National Wine Show Canberra. He also has judged at the Concours Mondial de Bruxelles and in wine competitions in the United Kingdom, United States, South Africa and New Zealand.

== Awards ==
Awards received for his writing include the Wine Spectator Book of the Year for Wine Atlas of California, the Gold Award at the World Food Media Awards for the Wine Atlas of Australia and New Zealand, and Best Multimedia Lifestyle Product at the Australian Industry Multimedia Awards for James Halliday's Interactive Wine Companion of Australia and New Zealand CD-ROM". Several of his books have been translated into European and Asian languages. He received the Charles Heidsieck Award for Excellence in Wine Journalism in 1983, the James Beard Foundation Award in both 1993 and 1994, the Julia Child award for Best Wine, Spirits or Beer Book in 1994, and the Maurice O'Shea Award for Outstanding Contribution to the Australian wine industry in 1995.

In June 2010, Halliday was made a Member of the Order of Australia (AM) in the 2010 Queen's Birthday Honours for "service to the wine industry as a winemaker, show judge, author and promoter of Australian wine internationally, and through senior roles with a range of professional organisations.".

== Books and media ==
- Coonawarra : the history, the vignerons & the wines, (1983) ISBN 0-9592306-0-2
- Clare Valley, the history, the vignerons & the wines, (1985), ISBN 0-9592306-1-0
- James Halliday's Australian wine guide, (1986),
- Setting up your own wine cellar (1992), ISBN 0-207-17498-9
- A history of the Australian wine industry 1949-1994, (1994), ISBN 1-875130-16-0
- An introduction to Australian wine 2nd ed (1996), ISBN 0-207-19107-7
- Classic wines of Australia (1997)
- Australia and New Zealand wine Companion 1997
- Australia and New Zealand wine Companion 1998
- Wine Atlas of Australia and New Zealand, (1998) ISBN 0-7322-6448-0
- James Halliday's wine odyssey... (2003)
- Australia & New Zealand wine companion, (2003) ISBN 0-7322-7625-X
- James Halliday's Wine Companion 2005, (2004) ISBN 0-7322-8023-0
- James Halliday Australian Wine Companion 2006 edition, (2005) ISBN 0-7322-8072-9
- James Halliday Australian Wine Companion 2007 edition, (2006) ISBN 0-7322-8369-8
- The Art and Science of Wine: The Subtle Artistry and Sophisticated Science of the Winemaker, (2006, co-authored with Hugh Johnson)
- James Halliday Australian Wine Companion 2008 edition, (2007) ISBN 1-74066-515-5
- Wine Atlas of Australia, (2006) ISBN 1-74066-348-9
- The Australian Wine Encyclopedia, Hardie Grant Books (2009) ISBN 978-1-74066-774-6
- Heart & soul: Australia's First Families of Wine, (2010) ISBN 978-1-74246-924-9 (as Foreword writer)
- James Halliday Wine Companion 2014 (2013)
- James Halliday Australian Wine Companion, 2014
- James Halliday's wine atlas of Australia, (2014)
- Halliday Wine Companion 2016 (2015)
