= Western Australian wine =

Wine produced in Western Australia

Western Australia (in red)

Western Australian wine refers to wine produced in Australia's largest state, Western Australia. Although the state extends across the western third of the continent, its wine regions are almost entirely situated in the cooler climate of its south-western tip. Western Australia produces less than 5% of the country's wine output, but in quality terms it is very much near the top, winning 30 percent of the country's medals.

== History ==
The Swan Valley established in 1829 by Thomas Waters is the historical centre for wine production in Western Australia. However, the state's cooler climate south-western wine regions such as Margaret River, and the Great Southern are considered to be more significant due to the Swan Valley being noted as one of the hottest viticultural regions in the world. Partly because of this, and as a reaction to the emergence of the Margaret River and Great Southern regions spanning the far south western corner of the state a large number of producers have deserted the area with the numbers of vineyards shrinking. In the year 1970, 90 percent of the state's wine was made from grapes grown in the Swan Valley; by 1980 the figure was 59 percent; by 1996 it was 15 percent and still falling.

In the late 1960s, winemaking grew in the southern regions of Western Australia with the influence of Antarctic currents and onshore westerlies offering a more temperate climate for grape production. Despite having only around 7 percent of Australia's vineyards and a mere 3 percent of grapes crushed, the winemaking regions of the South-West of the state attract a large amount of media attention.

== Appellation classes and divisions ==
Australian wine labelling appellations are classified into legal wine-producing areas under the Wine Australia Act. These appellations, called Australian Geographical Indications (AGI), are designated by the as either a zone, region, or sub-region that has a particular quality, reputation, or characteristic attributed to it; as defined by the regulatory government authority Wine Australia. To protect the reputation of each Geographical Indication, if a wine is labelled as from a specific appellation then 85% of grapes must be from that appellation. If it is a blend of grapes from two or three appellations, then 95% of grapes of the grapes must be from the appellations listed and the proportions of the blend have to be displayed as a percentage.

Western Australia has three zones with active wine industries, two of which are divided into nine regions and six sub-regions:

- Central Western Australia – Includes a handful of boutique cellar door wineries over a 600 km^{2} area.
- Greater Perth – Includes the regions of Perth Hills and Peel, along with the Swan District region and its Swan Valley sub-region.
- South West Australia – Includes the regions of Margaret River, Pemberton, Manjimup, Geographe, and Blackwood Valley, along with the Great Southern region which is further divided into the sub-regions of Albany, Denmark, Frankland River, Mount Barker, and Porongorup.

== Wine regions ==
=== Great Southern ===
The Great Southern is Australia's largest wine region a rectangle 200 kilometres from east to west and over 100 kilometres from north to south. The vineyards spread throughout the area have significant variations of terroir and climate dictated in part by the distance, however, the region is the coolest of Western Australia's viticultural areas; with a similar maritime influenced Mediterranean climate to Margaret River although with slightly less rainfall. This diverse region is known for Riesling, Chardonnay, Cabernet Sauvignon, Pinot noir, Shiraz, and Malbec.

=== Margaret River ===
The Margaret River wine region to the south of Western Australia, receives its temperate climate from the cooling influence of the Indian Ocean. Predominant grape varieties cultivated include Cabernet Sauvignon, Merlot, Sémillion, Sauvignon blanc, Chenin blanc and Chardonnay.

=== Swan District ===
The Swan District, of which the Swan Valley forms part, is the hottest wine region in Australia, with the grape harvest usually beginning in January. The Swan Valley is among the largest sources of Western Australia's wine, with grape varieties such as Verdelho, Chenin blanc, and Chardonnay.

== See also ==
- Australian wine
- List of wineries in Western Australia
