= Dorothy Hawtree =

Australian model and actress

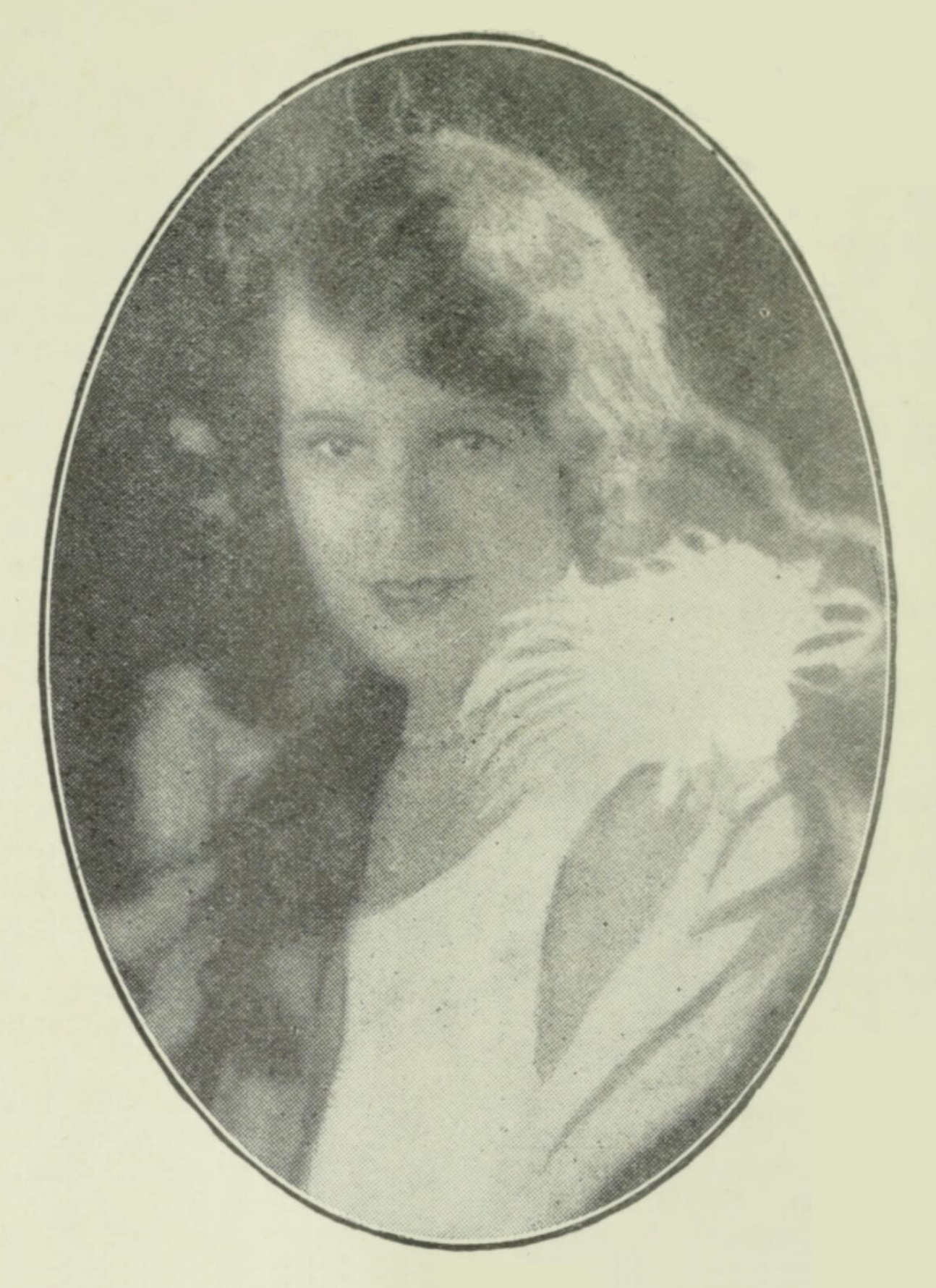
- Dorothy Hawtree, photograph published in January 1930.
- Born: Dorothy Gordon Hawtree; 28 December 1902; Paddington, New South Wales
- Died: 16 March 1981 (aged 78); Sydney, New South Wales
- Other names: Dorothy Alexander; Dorothy Dockar
- Occupations: actor, dancer and model

Dorothy Hawtree (1902-1981) was an Australian stage and screen actor, dancer and model during the 1920s. In 1919 she joined a theatre company touring the musical comedy The Better 'Ole to country towns, using motor vehicles to convey the artists and scenery (a process that had previously relied on the railway network). Hawtree's acting experience and successes in beauty competitions led to her being selected as a model for Rexona soap advertisements ("a Rexona Girl"). During the 1920s Hawtree appeared in theatrical prologues to major film releases, as well as pantomimes and other live theatre. She was cast in three silent films made in the early 1920s. In Daughter of the East Hawtree played the lead role and was a director of the company that produced the film.

After a marriage that ended in a high profile divorce, Hawtree re-married in 1931 and retired from show business.

== Biography ==
=== Early life ===
Dorothy Gordon Hawtree was born on 28 December 1902 in the inner eastern Sydney suburb of Paddington, the daughter of Francis Hawtree and Jessie (née Irvine). She was the eldest of five children in the family. Dorothy's father worked as a tram driver. In 1913 the family was living at 20 Barclay Street in Waverley.

On 30 January 1918 Hawtree, aged 15 years, appeared as the character 'Fanny Sunbeam' in "an up-to-date pantomime version" of Babes in the Wood, a performance described as "one of the successes of the evening". The entertainment was presented in the Repertory Theatre in Grosvenor Street, Sydney, with the proceeds going to the Bondi-Waverley Voluntary Aid Detachment for the Anzac Buffet in the Domain.

In mid-year 1918 a competition was held in Sydney designed to discover Australian young women "capable of doing work for the films", jointly organised by the proprietors of the Green Room magazine and Alec Lorimore of Paramount Pictures. Dubbed the Green Room Paramount Screen Contest, the competition gave each contestant "an opportunity of appearing before the camera in a potted playlet". The screen tests were shown at various Sydney cinemas (as additions to the feature film). Twelve of the "best girls" were to be awarded gold medals. A reference from 1922 indicates that Hawtree entered and won the Green Room Paramount Screen Contest (or perhaps she was one of the twelve who were awarded gold medals), despite the fact that she was still aged fifteen years at that time.

=== The Better 'Ole tour ===
In 1919 Hawtree was engaged to join an Australian theatre company to tour the patriotic musical comedy The Better 'Ole to country towns in New South Wales and Victoria. The tour was ground-breaking in its use of motor vehicles to convey the artists and scenery between country towns (a process that had previously relied on the railway network). This type of theatrical tour had been made possible in Australia by recent "improvements in motor travelling" and the innovation was "watched with more than ordinary interest". Hawtree played the role of the flirtatious 'Suzette', one of the two French maids (with the other maid, 'Victoire', played by the leading lady June Addell).

The Better 'Ole had been a success in London's West End after opening there in August 1917. In early 1919 an English dramatic company was brought to Australia by the theatrical entrepreneur Hugh D. McIntosh, performing the musical to great acclaim in Melbourne, Sydney and Adelaide (and several major regional centres).

Building on the popularity of the English company's performances, an Australian company was formed by Lionel Walsh (by arrangement with Hugh D. McIntosh) to tour The Better 'Ole to regional townships. Walsh, who had lately been the stage manager for J. and N. Tait, cast himself in the lead role of 'Old Bill'. Three "big" cars were purchased to convey the fifteen company members between townships, "fitted in a luxurious manner with a view to the personal comfort of the artists". A lorry was also purchased to "carry the scenery and wardrobe". Walsh's tour of The Better 'Ole using motor cars "induced several artists to sign up for the tour who in the past have refused to travel beyond the capital cities owing to the never-ending string of early train calls, commencing anywhere between 2 a.m. and break of day". The company became known as the Lionel Walsh Comedy Company.^{[A]}

The theatrical convoy left Sydney in late August 1919. For the first leg of the tour the company played at Katoomba, Bathurst, Orange, Wellington, Dubbo, Peak Hill and Parkes. An account in The Wyalong Advocate drew attention for its readers that the coming attraction to the township "is the actual play, not a picture" and that the performance "will be staged and mounted on the same complete and elaborate scale as characterised its production at the Tivoli Theatre Sydney". The Better 'Ole was performed at the Rio Hall in Wyalong on Saturday, 27 September 1919. By early October the tour had crossed the Murray River into Victoria, playing at Numurkah on October 8 and two nights later in the Shire Hall at Benalla. After a month in Victoria the company crossed back into New South Wales, playing at Deniliquin on November 11 and the following night in the town hall at Jerilderie.

In about mid-December 1919, prior to Walsh's theatrical company beginning a tour of Tasmania, Hawtree left the group. After Hawtree's departure, for the initial performances in Tasmania, the role of Suzette was shared between Dorothy May and Lena Henry.

=== A Rexona girl ===
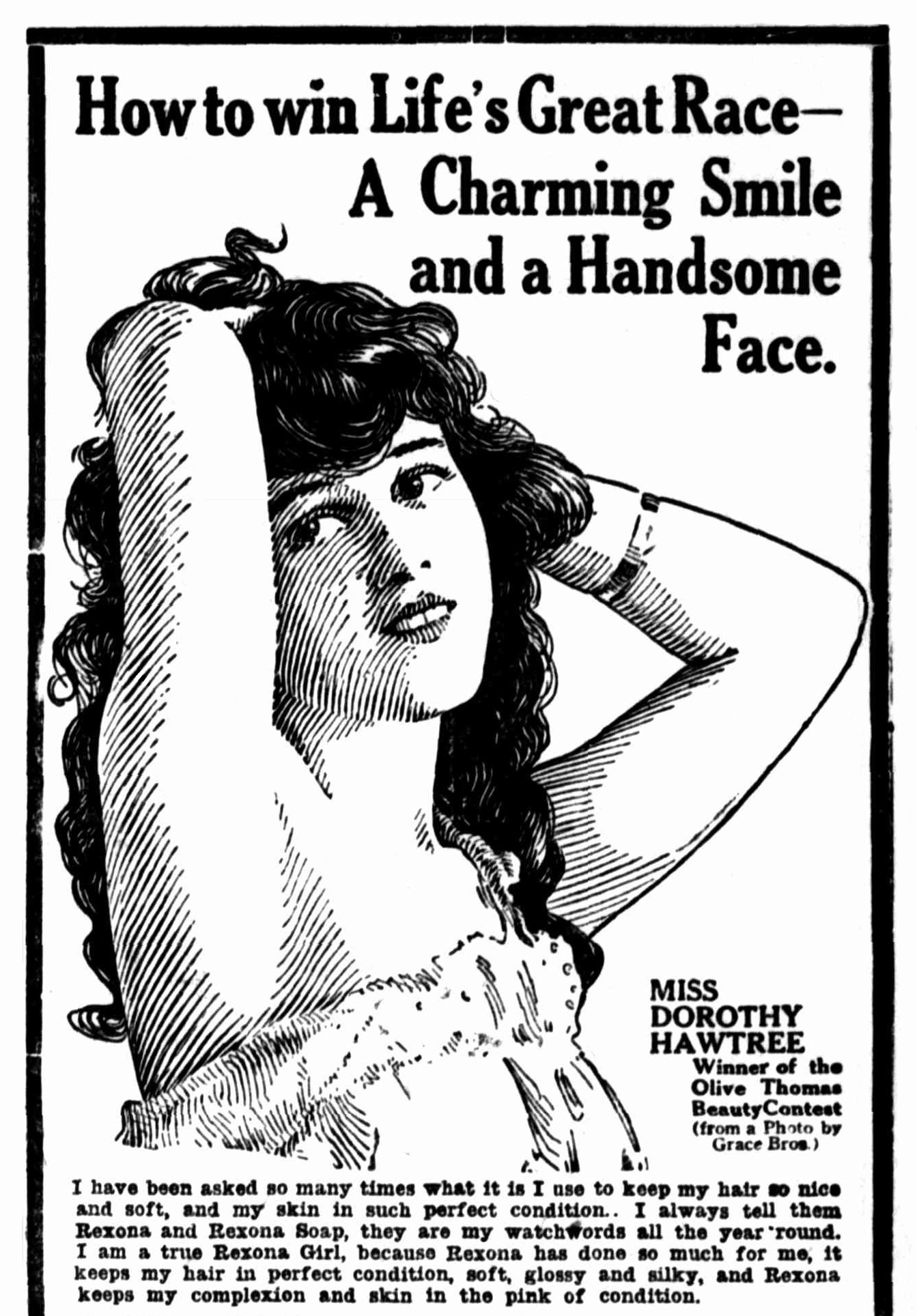
Detail from a Rexona soap advertisement featuring Hawtree (published in Sydney's The Sun, 18 September 1921).

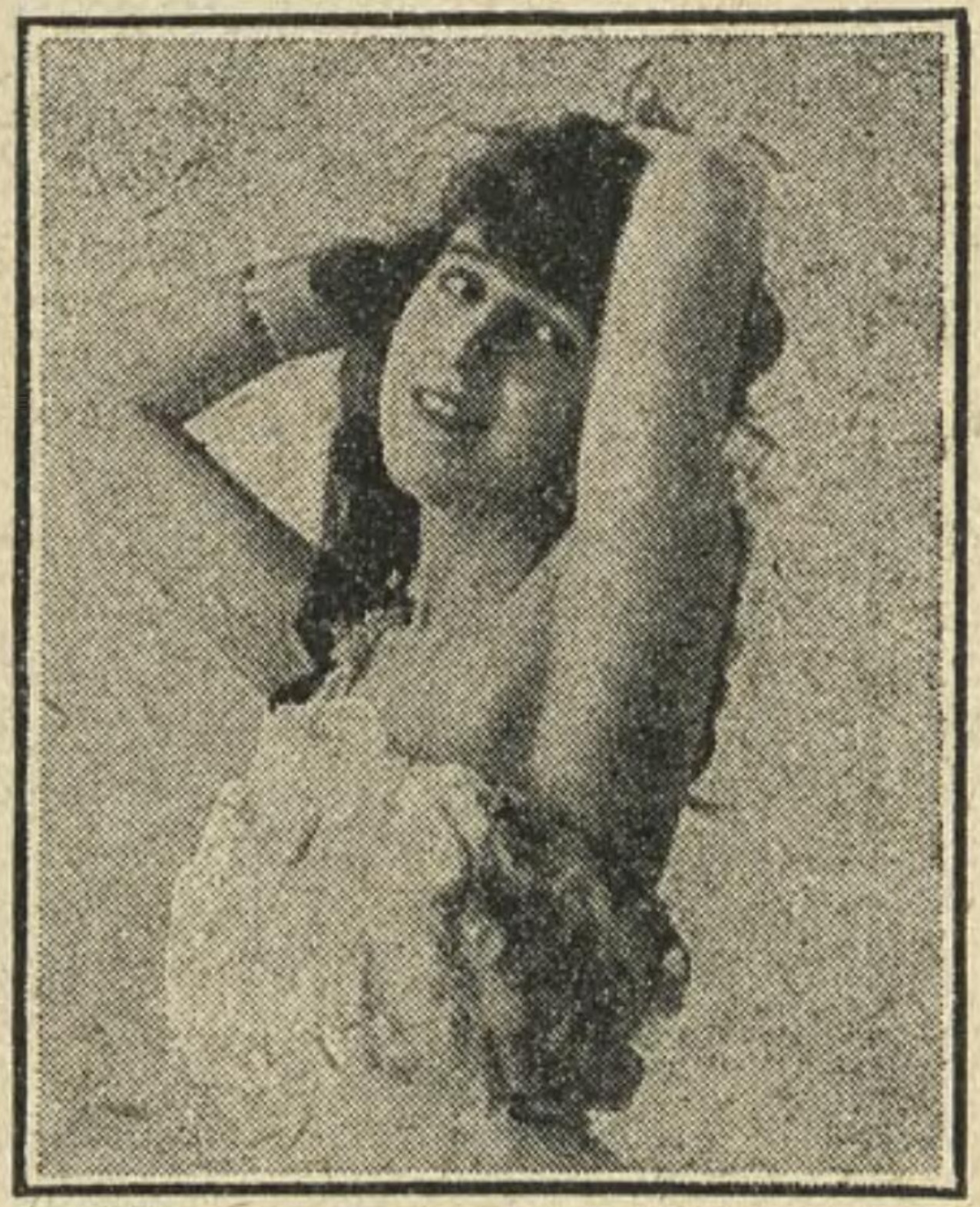
Portrait of Dorothy Hawtree; detail from a Rexona advertisement published in The Bulletin magazine, 25 November 1920.

On 8 October 1919, while Hawtree was touring country towns with The Better 'Ole company, a full-page advertisement for Rexona soap was published in Sydney's The Sun newspaper. The advertisement, with the headline "How to win life's great race— A charming smile and a handsome face!", featured a photograph of Hawtree, described as "A Charming Rexona Girl".

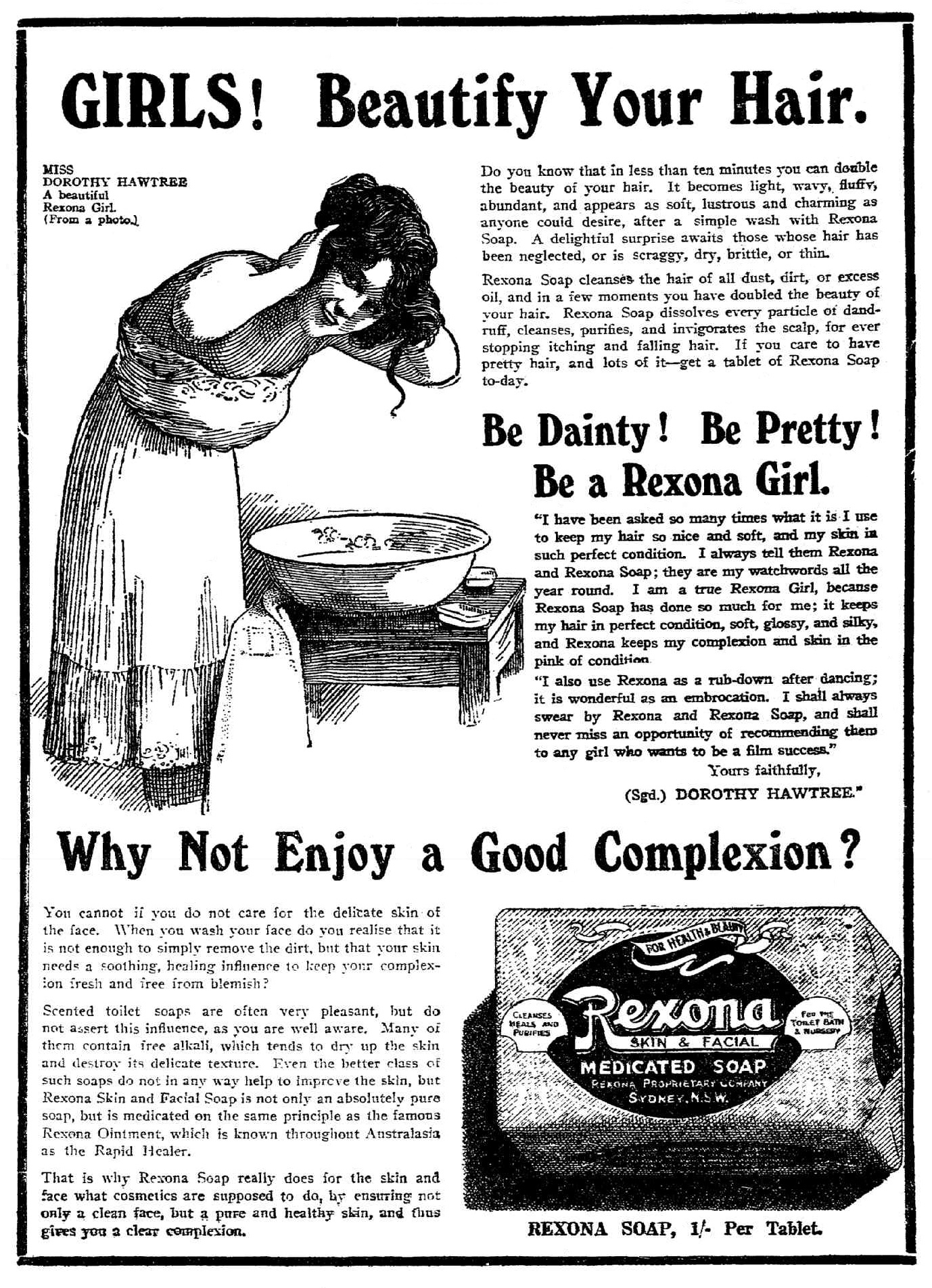
Advertisement for Rexona soap featuring Hawtree (published in Perth's Truth, 6 May 1922).

In Sydney in February 1920 a contest was commenced to find a double for the popular American silent-film star, Olive Thomas, with the winner to secure a film engagement of six months at £35 a week. The contest was conducted and voted upon by the audiences at sessions of The Spite Bride, a film starring Olive Thomas being screened in the Strand cinema in Pitt Street and the Empress in George Street. By mid-March "the ten most promising candidates" had been selected. In May it was announced that "Miss Dorothy Hawtree, of Mosman" had won the Olive Thomas double competition by 783 votes. Film footage of Hawtree and the two runners-up in the contest were to be "sent to America to be screened before Olive Thomas".

In June 1920 another full-page Rexona soap advertisement featuring Hawtree was published in Brisbane's Daily Mail. Further Rexona advertisements in various formats, featuring illustrations of Hawtree, were published in November and December 1920 in Sydney as well as Melbourne. The advertising copy was updated to inform readers that "Miss Hawtree is the winner of the Olive Thomas Beauty Contest, and has a great future predicted for her in motion pictures".

In September 1920 the news reached Australia of the tragic death of Olive Thomas in Paris.

In December 1920 a full-page advertisement for Rexona soap featured fourteen separate photographs of young women (including Hawtree), captioned "Some Beautiful Members of the Rexona Girls' Club; Why Not be a Rexona girl, too?; Be Dainty, be Pretty, be Attractive, be a Rexona Girl".^{[B]}

In November 1921 Hawtree danced with Kelso Henderson in a revue at the Tivoli Theatre in Sydney. Their performance was described as "a tip-top exhibition of feature dancing", which was so popular with the audience "they had to extend their turn considerably". Their encore number was described as "striking and athletic", where "Mr. Henderson swings Miss Hawtree round and round at a terrific rate, while she clings to his neck". Later in November Henderson and Hawtree danced at the Dixieland Cabaret at Clifford Gardens near Mosman, on Sydney's Lower North Shore.

Rexona advertisements using Hawtree's image in various formats continued to be published in newspapers up until March 1924.

=== Film work ===
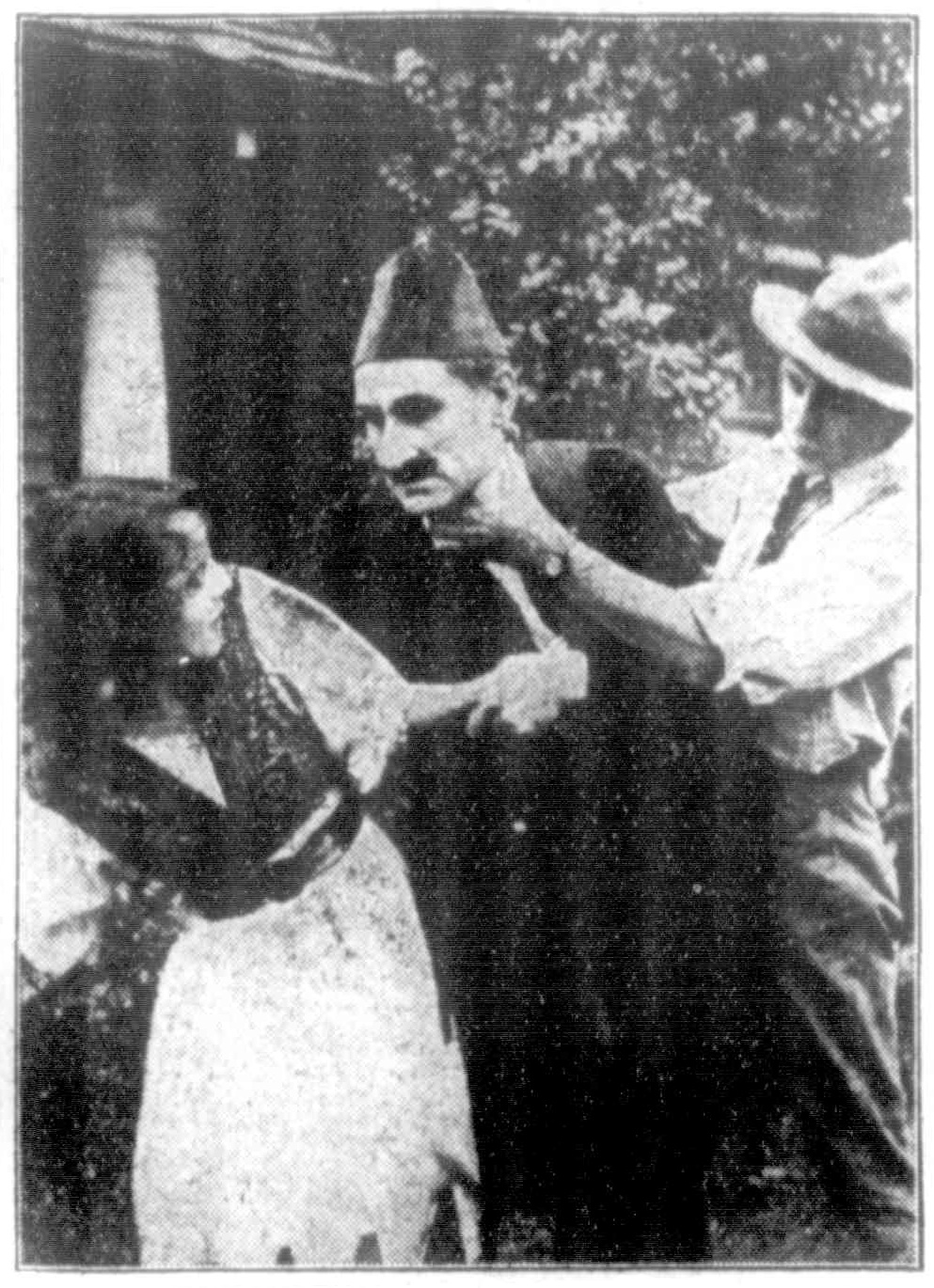
A scene from the film, A Daughter of the East (published in Evening News, 7 October 1924).

In April 1922 the Lyceum Beauty Week Competition was held in Sydney. Entrants in the competition were filmed at the Australasian Films' studios at Rushcutters Bay and selected screen tests were shown in special presentations in the Lyceum and New Lyric theatres in Sydney. Dorothy Hawtree entered the competition and, at the end of the process, was judged to be the overall winner.

When The Mark of Zorro starring Douglas Fairbanks was showing in the Strand cinema in May and June 1922, a special stage prologue was performed at the afternoon and evening sessions by Hawtree and F. M. Crougey. Hawtree played the part of Lolita, Zorro's "sweetheart", and Crougey, a well-known baritone singer, impersonated Fairbanks in the feature film's title role. During the silent movie era prologues were short dramatic scenes performed live in the cinema before the screening of the film, thematically linked to the film to follow. Prologues were presented by the major moving picture theatres as an added attraction for audiences to attend major film releases.

From June 1922 Hawtree and Frank Charlton performed the prologue to The Sheik at screenings of the film in a number of Sydney picture theatres. A critic for the Sunday Times newspaper described the prologue to The Sheik as "bright and novel" and remarked that Hawtree was "unusually pleasing in her new role, and her clever dancing is shown to advantage".

Hawtree was cast in Roy Darling's film, The Lust for Gold, made in 1922. Upon its completion Darling was unable to secure a release for the film and made a loss of the total cost, amounting to £900.

In 1922 Hawtree was cast in the second production from the studios of Austral Super Films. The film was titled A Daughter of Australia and starred Yvonne Pavis and Lawson Harris (who also directed the film). It was shot in and around Sydney and on the 'Dalkeith' pastoral station near Cassilis. In a review of the film Hawtree was described as "the local beauty, who screens admirably and shows promise for the future". The film opened in the Apollo Theatre in Pitt Street in early September 1922. A Daughter of Australia continued to be shown in state capitals and country cinemas throughout 1922 and 1923.

Dorothy Hawtree and Roy Darling were two of seven directors of Olympic Films Limited, registered as a company in December 1922 "to carry on the business of making, producing and completing moving pictures".

Hawtree played the female lead in a film made by Olympic Films and directed by Darling, which was completed in mid-1923. The film was previewed in October 1923 under the title The Boy of the Dardanelles, but failed to receive a theatre release. After extended negotiations with Paramount Pictures, Darling obtained a release in October 1924 under the new title of Daughter of the East, but the film was not a success.

In January 1924 Hawtree was a cast-member of the pantomime Dick Whittington and His Cat, performed at the Majestic Theatre in Newtown.

=== Marriages, Later Life, and Death ===
Dorothy Hawtree married Frank Alexander on 20 February 1926 in the Catholic Apostolic Church in Elizabeth Street, Redfern. After the marriage the couple initially lived in Rainbow Street in Coogee.

In January 1927 a competition called the First National Film Star Quest was announced, a nationwide search for young women with the qualities to be a motion picture actress. Sponsored by the First National Exhibitors of Australia, the first prize was all expenses-paid travel to Hollywood for the winner and her chaperone, together with a ten-week contract (with a weekly salary of £20) with the American producer Cecil B. DeMille. The competition was widely advertised and attracted two thousand contestants from across Australia and New Zealand. Hawtree was one of fifty competitors who were short-listed in the New South Wales section of the Film Star Quest, which was co-sponsored by the Evening News newspaper in Sydney. She had entered under her maiden name and was listed as an entrant as "Miss Dorothy Hawtree". During her later divorce proceedings Hawtree claimed she had entered the competition at her husband's suggestion. The eventual winner of the contest from New South Wales was Phyllis Gibbs from Coogee, with Hawtree one of the state runners-up.^{[C]}

From late April 1927 Dorothy Hawtree was part of a special prologue to accompany the screening of Cecil B. DeMille's The Volga Boatman at the Crystal Palace in George Street, Sydney. Hawtree and Barend Harris presented the song 'Petrushka', together with selections by G. Harry Stone and His Orchestra and The Russian Choir singing 'The Song of the Volga Boatmen'.

In June 1927 Hawtree was part of the Penfolds Wines tableau at the Movie Ball at the Palais Royal at Moore Park, an annual event for charity of the Sydney motion picture industry.

In October 1927 Hawtree starred with Douglas Boyd at the Newtown Majestic Theatre in a play titled Not To-night, Dearie, described as a "bright comedy". The cast members were drawn from Frank Neil's Company, with the action of the play taking place in the vestibule of a hotel.

In late December 1929 and into January 1930, Hawtree played the role of 'Will Scarlet' in matinee performances of the pantomime Babes in the Wood at the Grand Opera House in Sydney.

In March 1930 Hawtree was granted a decree nisi for the dissolution of her marriage to Frank Alexander on the ground of "the husband's habitual drunkenness and cruelty". At a Divorce Court hearing in late June 1931 the Crown Solicitor intervened to attempt to prevent the decree nisi being made absolute, claiming that at the time Hawtree obtained her decree she "was living in adultery" with James Dockar at 'Bognor Flats' in Plowman Street in Bondi. However, Justice Owen stated that the Crown "had failed to prove any misconduct against the petitioner" and dismissed the intervention. The judge granted the decree absolute and declared the marriage dissolved.

Dorothy Hawtree married James Dockar on 18 July 1931 at Waverley.

At the time of her death on 16 March 1981, Dorothy was living in Old South Head Road, Rose Bay, Sydney. Her husband, James Dockar, died on 26 February 1981.

== Filmography ==
- The Lust for Gold (1922) – completed in 1922; unable to secure a cinema release.
- A Daughter of Australia (1922) – released in September 1922.
- Daughter of the East – completed in mid-1923; given a trade preview in October 1923 under the title The Boy of the Dardanelles; finally released under the new title of Daughter of the East in October 1924.

== Notes ==
A.The Lionel Walsh Comedy Co. (also known as the Lionel Walsh Musical Comedy Co. or Lionel Walsh's Opera Co.) continued to tour until 1928, presenting productions such as The O'Brien Girl, Sally, Little Nellie Kelly, No, No, Nanette and The Rise of Rosie O'Reilly to audiences in country towns in Tasmania, Victoria, New South Wales and Queensland. By 1928 the company was staging productions in their own "canvas theatre".

B.The 'Rexona Girls' advertising concept began in 1914 with a series of advertisements for Rexona Medicated Soap featuring "Two Rexona Girls from New Zealand". By 1915 the company began using images of actresses in their newspaper advertisements. Typically the promotion included an endorsement of the soap products from the "Rexona girl", some rudimentary information about the subject and an image (either a photograph or a detailed illustration) of the young woman. The fourteen actresses included in the full-page advertisement in December 1920 were: Mabel Batchelor, Cecil Bradley, Dot Brunton, Eileen Cottey, Madge Elliott, Dorothy Hawtree, Gracie Lavers, Dolly Nepean, Beryl Novak, Estelle Ray, Brydie Revenall, Jean Robertson, Olga Robinson and Edna Waters.

C.Phyllis Gibbs went on to become the overall winner of the First National Film Star Quest, at an event in Melbourne in April 1927 featuring the winners from each Australian state and New Zealand.
