= Thomas Francis Hyland =

Australian businessman

- Born: 1831; Ireland
- Died: March 1, 1920 (aged 88–89)
- Occupation: Businessman

Thomas Francis Hyland (c. 1831 – 1 March 1920) was a businessman of Victoria, Australia, instrumental in turning Penfolds Wines from a cottage industry to an Australian icon.

== History ==
Thomas Francis Hyland was born in Ireland, the youngest son of John Hyland, of Ballinalard, (Note: Mis-spelled "Ballinilard" on T. F. Hyland's tombstone.) a small village 2 km west of Tipperary, Ireland. He migrated to Australia at the time of the gold rush, worked at the diggings, and in 1853 gained employment as a warder at Pentridge Stockade then the hulk President, was promoted to chief warder of the hulk Success, was transferred to Collingwood Stockade, then governor of Portland Gaol, finally to become around 1868 the notoriously hard-driving governor of Castlemaine Gaol.

On 24 September 1862, he married Mary Georgina Anne "Georgina" Penfold, only child of Dr. Christopher Rawson Penfold (2 August 1811 – 26 March 1870) and Mary Penfold, née Holt (1816 (Note: From death notice; some references put her birth at 1810 or 1820.) – 31 December 1895) of "The Grange", Magill.

Dr. Penfold, son of John Penfold, vicar of Steyning, Sussex, was trained at St Bartholomew's Hospital, and practised medicine at fashionable Brighton from 1838 to 1844. He married Mary, daughter of Dr. Thomas Holt of Edmonton, London, on 26 May 1835. They migrated to South Australia aboard Taglioni, arriving in June 1844 with their daughter Georgina, and servant Ellen Timbrell. He was in straitened finances: apart from the cost of the voyage, he had spent £1200 on their 500 acres (200 ha) Magill property, purchased sight unseen from Robert Cock and William Ferguson. He had borrowed £200 from his cousin Thomas Brooks Penfold before leaving England; three years later the cousin, who followed him a year later aboard Augustus, was anxious for its return, with interest.
He had brought vine cuttings from England and France, mostly Grenache, their cut ends sealed with wax. He planted a vineyard near the house, and within a few years was making red wines, carefully stored in small French oak casks. Mary is known to have had a major part in its production and blending. Soon they had more than enough for his grateful patients (in those days fortified red wine, particularly port, (Note: No mention has been found of where the brandy spirit for fortifying the wine came from. Did he have his own still? was it imported? or did he purchase it from someone like A. J. Tolley?) was considered beneficial for anemia and other complaints, and Penfold had no faith in the efficacy of the imported product), and enjoyed modest sales in Victoria as well as South Australia.
Penfold was a successful doctor and popular figure in the area. He was on the building committee of St. George's Anglican Church, Woodforde, South Australia, the first Anglican church building in the colony, and still in use. (Note: He was not the 1854 clerk to the District Council of East Torrens; that was his cousin, Capt. Thomas Brooks Penfold (died before 1864), late of the Honorable East India Company, who had a nine-roomed house and a few acres in Magill for sale in 1856.) then in 1856 the first chairman of the District Council of Burnside. Ellen Timbrell died on 3 September 1857.

The Hylands' daughter Inez Kathleen Hyland was born 16 August 1863, and from age eight lived with her grandmother at The Grange, Magill. She was not a strong child, and her parents believed the clear air and moderate climate of Magill would be beneficial to her health. A strong bond grew between the two: Inez was a brilliant and imaginative child and Mary encouraged her writing, especially her poetry. Even well into her late 20s, Inez seems to have no other life; perhaps she was an invalid. She died from typhoid fever on 11 January 1892, and Mary left for Melbourne shortly after, never to return. She published a collection of her granddaughter's work, as In Sunshine and in Shadow in 1893, which received some excellent, if mixed, reviews.

Dr. Penfold died in 1870 after a long illness and was buried in St. George's churchyard. Mary by then had taken full control of the vineyard and winery, and in 1869 had hired as assistant Joseph Gillard (1846–1927). Gillard became manager of the Magill "Grange" vineyards in 1881.

Hyland recommended to Mary Penfold, presumptuously some reckon, that she sell the business and retire, a not unrealistic suggestion, as the property and business had become quite valuable and the sale would enable her to live in comfort indefinitely, but she was adamant: the winery was her life, and like Ann Bickford twenty years earlier, determined to keep alive the business her husband started. Another reading could be that Hyland, who would have known his mother-in-law well, was offering his moral support whichever route she chose.

On 14 September 1881 they signed an arrangement: that Hyland should be Penfolds' accountant and their marketing agent for Victoria, where he would continue to live, leaving Mary to run the winery, and receive 10% of profits. Hyland, who had in 1876 taken 12 months' leave of absence in 1876 preparatory, it was thought, to retiring, finally retired from Castlemaine Gaol and the Penal Department in 1883.

Mary died in 1895; the following year some members of the family adopted the style "Penfold Hyland", recognising the importance of the name "Penfold". It later frequently appeared in print hyphenated as "Penfold-Hyland", but with what justification it is difficult to ascertain.

Under Hyland's guidance, the company established vineyards and wineries at McLaren Vale and Nuriootpa in South Australia, and Dalwood and Minchinbury in New South Wales and offices in Adelaide, Sydney, Melbourne, Perth, and London. His son Frank Hyland managed the business in Sydney and Leslie Hyland in Adelaide

Georgina died at home on 27 August 1911 aged 67, and her remains were interred at Brighton General Cemetery. Thomas Francis Hyland also died at home, at the age of 88 years.

== Family ==
Thomas Francis Hyland (c. 1831 – 1 March 1920) married (Mary) Georgina Penfold (1835 – 27 August 1911) in 1861. Their family included:

- Inez Hyland (16 August 1863 - 1892) wrote poems published posthumously by her grandmother Mary Penfold as 'In Sunshine and in Shadow'
- Estelle Ianthe Hyland (20 August 1868 – 1946) married Charles Knight on 23 August 1889 in Melbourne; left for England and not heard from again.
- Frank Astor Penfold Hyland ( 30 December 1872 – 17 December 1948) married Gladys Lethbridge (17 March 1886 – 11 July 1974). He was governing director, Penfolds Wines Ltd.; she succeeded him and chaired the board from 1948 to 1961. A noted collector of fine art, she was invested as CBE in 1967. He was in 1918 founder of Federal Viticultural Council.

- Rada Penfold Hyland (1922–1980) married Captain Stuart Shierlaw (–) of the Indian Army on 3 January 1945. She married again, in London, to (retired) Major Roderick "Paddy" Russell on 20 November 1952. Author of Wine Talk, she inherited a fortune on the death of her mother. Rada was the subject of Wendy Paramor's 1963 entry for the Archibald Prize.

- Rebel Penfold-Russell (–) fashion journalist of Mode magazine, executive producer of Priscilla, Queen of the Desert and acting parts in that film as well as Easy Virtue and Paws. She was awarded an OAM in 2009.

- (Herbert) Leslie Penfold Hyland (4 March 1875 – 6 May 1940) was a golfing prodigy: five months after learning to play he was runner-up for the Victorian championship; a few months later he won the Essendon Club championship. He married Edith Mary Miller (–), a daughter of W. H. Miller (c. 1839 – 20 September 1915), on 30 April 1900, which marriage ended in acrimony. Their family included:

- Evelyn Penfold Hyland (c. 1902–1982) married Ernest Edward Jolly (c. 1890 – 23 February 1952) of Brougham Place, North Adelaide, on 20 December 1926. He and his brother A. W. Jolly carried on business A. E. Jolly & Co. started by their father in 1883.
- Francis William "Bill" Penfold Hyland (c. 1904 – 28 January 1946) married Genevieve Primrose Malcom in 1929. Genevieve was a granddaughter of John Primrose

- Judith Anne "San" Penfold Hyland (c. 1930 – ) married Reginald Lester "Reg" Tolley (1927 – ) on 20 April 1950. They divorced around 1968.

- Kym Tolley (10 March 1953 – ) was a Coonawarra vigneron.
- Alexandra "Ang" Tolley
- Rebecca "Bec" Tolley

- Christopher Rawson "Jim" Penfold Hyland (c. 1907 – 23 July 1926) killed by a hit-and-run driver while walking back from the Glenelg Palais de Danse. Francis Joseph Siebert (c. 1877 – 19 October 1952) was named as the culprit but never charged.
- Jeffery (often Jeffrey) Penfold Hyland OBE (24 February 1911 – ) married Margaret C. Lewis on 13 September 1939. He is remembered for supporting Ray Beckwith and Max Schubert in their "Grange Hermitage" experiments, against opposition by the formidable Gladys Penfold Hyland. Inducted into Barons of Barossa in 1975.

From around 1890 they lived at "Moorabbin", Were Street, Brighton Beach.
