= Ray Beckwith =

Australian wine chemist

Arthur Ray Beckwith (23 February 1912 – 7 November 2012) was a South Australian wine chemist, whose methods enabled Penfolds' winemaker Max Schubert to produce excellent table wines, and develop his Penfolds Grange. For most of his long life his achievements and influence were overlooked but came to be recognised after his retirement.

== History ==
Beckwith was born in Cowell, South Australia, the eldest son of ironmonger Arthur Henry Beckwith (1883–1947) and his wife Blanche Beckwith (1881–1941), née Brown.

He grew up in Murray Bridge and was educated at Murray Bridge High School. He proceeded to Roseworthy Agricultural College, where he was dux in his second year and completed his Honours Diploma of Agriculture in 1932. In 1933 he won a cadetship, one of five such paid positions, to operate a model winery at Roseworthy, under Alan R. Hickinbotham (1898–1959) and John L. Williams' (died 1962). His first research project was to investigate the use of pure cultured yeasts rather than those which occur naturally on the skins of the grapes, and soon proved the superiority of cultured yeasts.

From there he was headhunted by Colin Haselgrove (Note: Colin Powell Haselgrove (born 1904), noted wine judge and yachtsman) of Thomas Hardy Wines as an assistant to winemaker Roger Warren, (Note: John Roger Hogarth Warren (died 1960)) making sparkling wines at Mile End, then poached by Leslie Penfold Hyland, manager of Penfolds Wines in Nurioootpa, as assistant to Alf Scholz, (Note: Scholz (poss. Alfred Ernest Scholz, born 1895) was manager of Penfold's Nuriootpa winery for 47 years.) commencing on 2 January 1935. His first major project was construction of a laboratory dedicated to yeast research and a large vessel for yeast cultivation. The strain he settled on was one from Portugal, designated A1. He was able to prove that avoiding over-temperature during fermentation was a major factor in reducing bacterial spoilage.

In 1936 Beckwith undertook some research at the laboratory of A. Killen Macbeth, Angas Professor of Chemistry at the University of Adelaide, looking into the effects of acidity on wines. In spite of the Great Depression, Macbeth had been able to purchase from England a Cambridge electronic pH meter, a recent and very expensive innovation which allowed speedy and accurate measurements of this parameter. His researches led to the finding that controlling acidity could limit bacterial growth in wines and reduce spoilage to practically zero. Until this discovery, much wine production was so spoiled that it was fit only for distillation. Manipulation of wine pH with tartaric acid, a natural component of wine, is now part of the winemaker's arsenal. His work so impressed Leslie Penfold Hyland that his request for a similar pH meter was approved without question. (Note: "Morton glass electrode" may refer to a pH electrode designed or invented by Charles Morton, M.D. F. R. S., an English pioneer of vacuum-tube potentiometry with George Zaidan.)

Beckwith married in late 1936 and settled down to live in Nuriootpa. After some time in that town, he was asked to move to Magill, but neither he nor Mrs. Beckwith wished to move, so after some initial commuting, he only visited Magill when needed. Stories that he was responsible for introducing Max Schubert to winemaking have been denied by Beckwith. Schubert, who until 1938 was working as a stablehand, began his winemaking career at Magill in 1938, as assistant to the blender, Albert Edward Vesey (c. 1863–1952).

Aside from the fortune saved for Penfolds by Beckwith's innovations and methods, particularly preventive discipline, consistency and standardization, he also raised the quality of wine by application of science. He was arguably the first to employ paper chromatography to monitor the progress of malolactic fermentation, and was an advocate of stainless steel to replace other metals in the pumps and pipes used for processing and conveying of wine. He introduced cooling tubes to slow down the fermentation process, Without his work, Max Schubert's Grange Hermitage would never have reached the heights it achieved. Schubert's wines, of which Grange was a small if celebrated part, were not a sudden inspiration: they were the product of successive incremental improvements that raised Penfolds from a producer of mediocre fortified wines to a producer of reliable, first-rate table wines, and Beckwith was behind him every step of the way.

Beckwith retired in 1973, two years before Schubert, but continued to take an active interest in the firm, and also had his own small vineyard outside the town.

== Recognition ==
- In 1980 he was inducted into Barons of Barossa.
- In 2003 he was granted life membership to the Australian Wine Industry
- He was made an Honorary Life member of the American Society for Enology and Viticulture
- In 2004 he was awarded Doctor of the University (Duniv) from the University of Adelaide
- In 2006 he received Maurice O'Shea Award from McWilliam's Wines
- In 2008 the Order of Australia "for service to the Australian wine industry through contributions towards enhancing the quality and efficiency of the winemaking process."

== Family ==
Arthur Ray Beckwith married Coral Ivy Jean Lodge (c. 1907 – 26 October 1996) on 26 December 1936."Family Notices". The Advertiser (Adelaide). South Australia. 11 January 1937. p. 12 – via National Library of Australia. They had one child, a son born in 1949.
