= The Intimate Stranger (unfinished film) =

- Directed by: Roy Darling
- Written by: William Lynch
- Based on: novel by William Lynch
- Produced by: William Lynch
- Starring: John Saul; Georgie Sterling
- Cinematography: Carl Kyser
- Production company: Endeavour Film Productions Ltd
- Release date: 1948 (intended)
- Running time: incomplete
- Country: Australia
- Language: English

The Intimate Stranger was a proposed Australian feature film from director Roy Darling. The film was never completed although some scenes were shot and the cast included some of the country's finest actors. It was billed as a "psychological drama".

== Cast ==
- John Saul as Paul Garner
- Lesley Pope
- Georgie Sterling as Kitty
- Lloyd Lamble
- Margo Lee
- Kerry Norton
- John Nugent-Hayward
- Sydney Wheeler

== Production ==
The movie was financed by Endeavour Film Productions Ltd, created by a group of businessmen, with the intention to produce one feature and four shorts a year. It was based on a novel by William Lynch and was advertised as:

Completely unlike anything attempted before... the most interesting film project yet undertaken in this country... the characters are real people, with the authentic ring of the present day. The story unfolds against a background of the more Bohemian, sections of Kings Cross and the idyllic seclusion of the Pacific coast near Palm Beach.

Leading radio actor John Saul was to play the lead, Paul Garner, "a strangely complex personality" who gets involved with an "alluring model", Kitty (Georgie Sterling). The rest of the cast was mostly taken from popular radio actors, including Sydney Wheeler and Lloyd Lamble. Screen tests for young actors were done at Supreme Sound Studios in February 1947. June Dally-Watkins also worked on the movie doing make up.

The movie was made during a time of industrial turmoil in the Australian film industry, with Actors Equity fighting Ealing Studios, Columbia Pictures, and Charles Chauvel over minimum weekly wages for actors. The union sought to increase this from £18 a week to £20. Producers of The Intimate Stranger had their pay rates approved by Equity. Members of the cast were allowed to continue with stage and/or radio work provided it did not interfere with the film's production schedule.

Filming began in April 1947 in North Sydney, with William Constable as art designer. However the movie ran out of money and was never completed. Endeavour Films was soon wound up.
