= Lindsay Booth =

Australian businessman (1918–1999)

Lindsay Stanley Booth
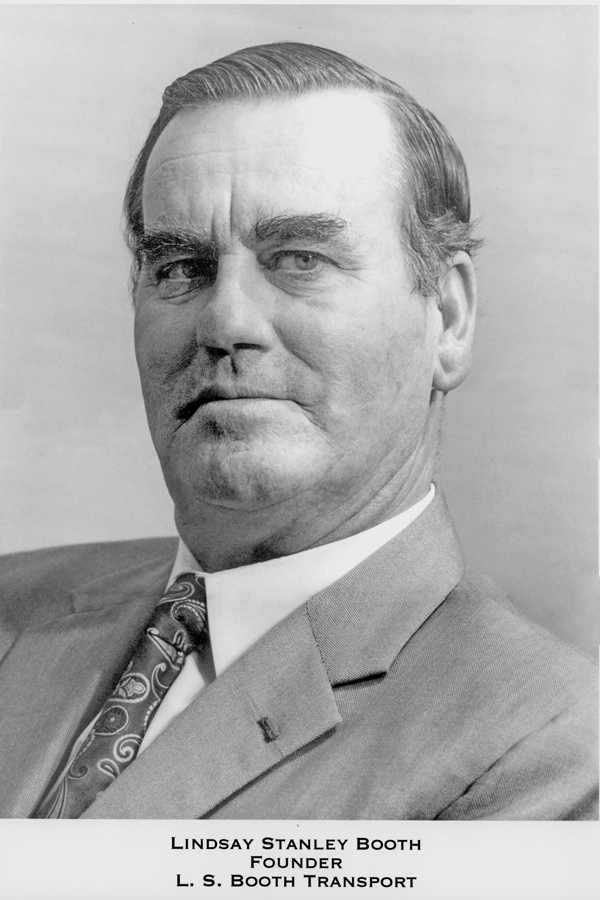
- Born: 30 August 1918
- Died: 27 March 1999 (aged 80)
- Occupations: Farmer; Transport manager

Lindsay Stanley Booth (30 August 1918 – 27 March 1999) was an Australian businessman and farmer, best known as the founder of LS Booth Wine Transport (now Booth Transport) in 1936.

== Early life ==
Lindsay was one of nine children born to Lily and Arthur Booth. Arthur was a grape grower and farmer in Reynella

Lindsay grew up on a farm and vineyard property just a few minutes away from where Mt Hurtle Winery stands. Lindsay attended Reynella Primary School only up to grade 7, leaving to work.

In 1935 at the age of 17 Lindsay met his sweetheart Gwen, who was 15, at Brighton jetty. Gwen would constantly walk up and down the jetty, until Lindsay decided to go up and talk to her. They instantly hit it off and began dating. Lindsay would ride his motorbike to the Windsor Theatre every Saturday for five years before they married in 1940 at the age of 22 and 20.

They had 5 children over the next 10 years; Devron (born 1941), Brian (born 1943), Virginia (b. 1944, now deceased), Roslyn (born 1948) and Lindsay Jr.(born 1950). Lindsay had a fondness of horse racing throughout his life, getting to the track as often as he could. He also enjoyed overseas travel.

== Career ==
Lindsay left school at the age of 14 years in 1932. He worked for his brother Geoffrey who also had a truck & was a share farmer etc.

In 1936 he planted garden peas on approximately four acres of land which he rented from a neighbour Mr Ernie Luxmore. The rent for the land was to clear the old vines that grew there. He borrowed his fathers horses to clear the vines and plant the peas. The horses wondered what was going when after being knocked off for the day Lindsay re harnessed them and put them back for more work. These peas grew a magnificent crop. However, when it was time to pick it rained incessantly. Lindsay paid double wages to pick the peas and was rewarded by getting a very high price. From the profit he was able to buy his first truck. A brand new thirty hundred weight (one and a half ton) Bedford.

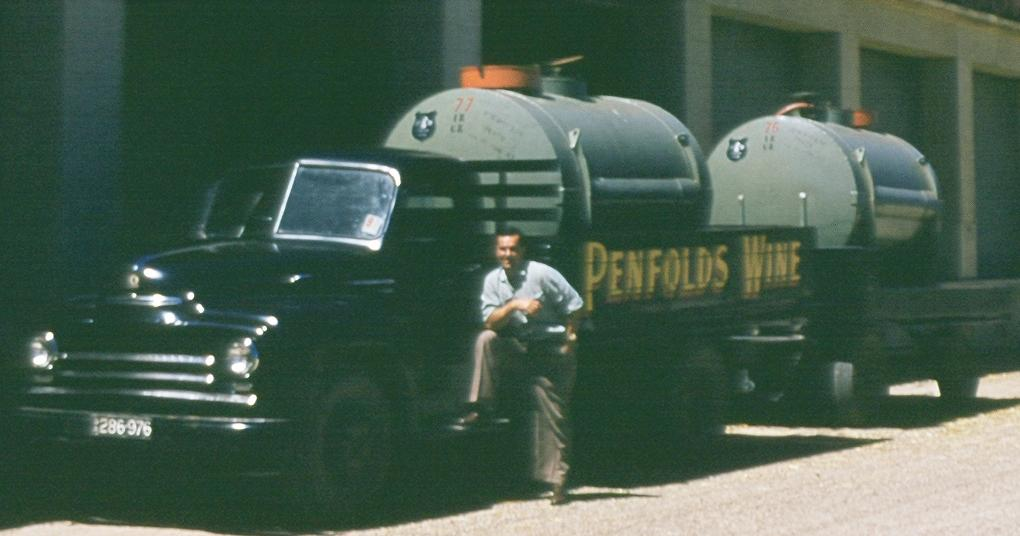

The Bedford was used to cart firewood, grapes, grain and hay. This was the start of L.S Booth Wine Transport Pty. Lindsay recruited his brother Keith to cart flax for the government to the flax mill in Morphett Vale.

Lindsay's first winery customer was Penfold's, for whom he first carted grapes in 1938. For many years his trucks were painted with Penfold's colours & logo. Other customers included Osborn Winery, now d'Arenberg, McLaren Vale. Lindsay worked with and befriended many of the pioneers and notable characters of the Australian wine industry, including Bob Hardy, the Norman family & Max Schubert just to name a few.

Transport was not Lindsay's only business. Other activities included his Morphett Vale vineyard, sheep, barley, peas, leasing & share farming. L.S. Booth Wine Transport remained a local carrier until his sons Devron, Brian & Lindsay Jr. wished to expand into interstate transport. So in 1968 Lindsay stepped back from day-to-day operations of L.S. Booth Wine Transport to give his sons this opportunity.

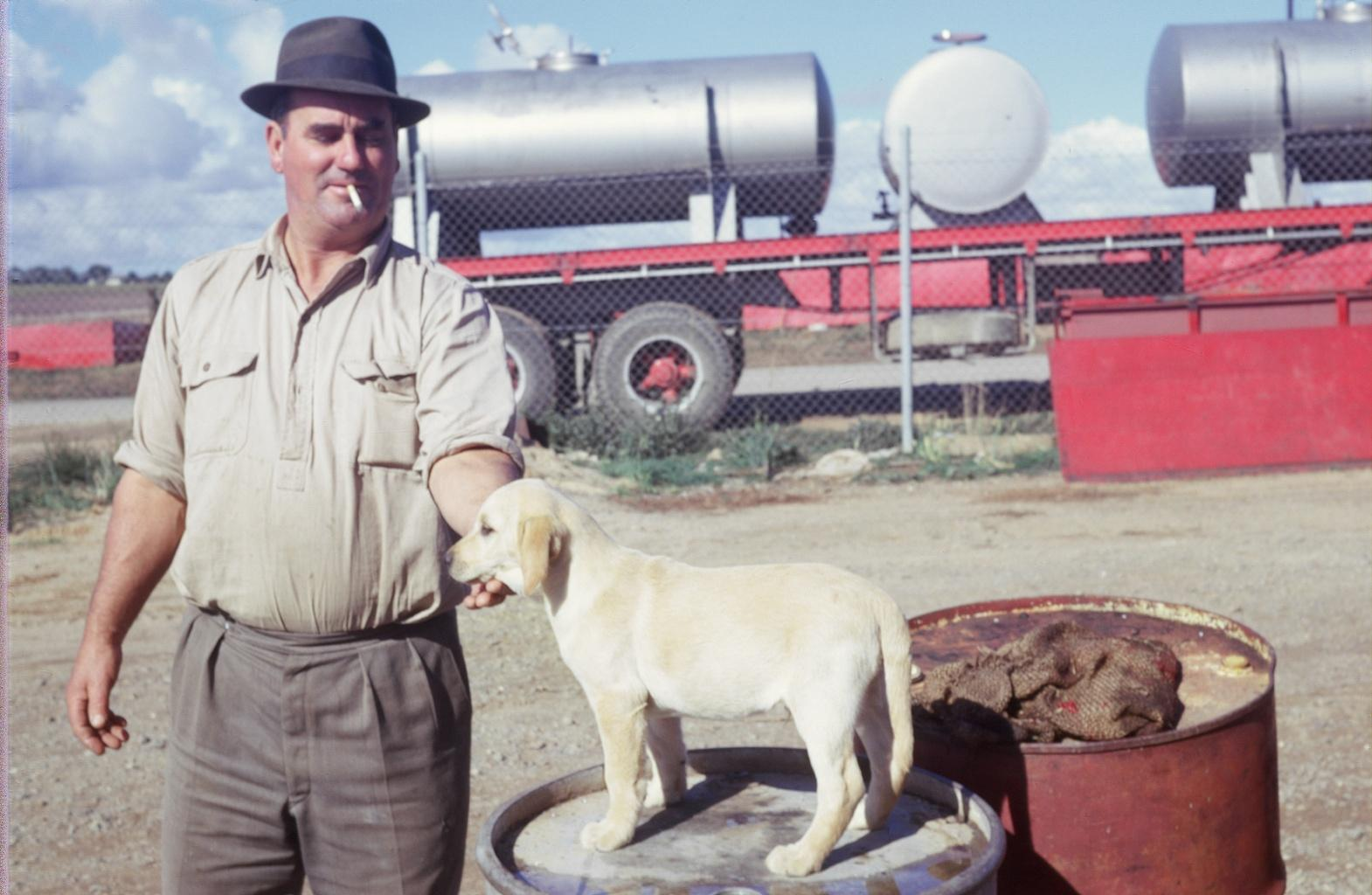

== Retirement ==
In 1975 at the age of 57, Booth semi-retired to McLaren Vale with his wife Gwen, to a block of land on Seaview Road. Retirement was not for him, and a year later he and Lindsay Jr established yet another vineyard. It was fortunate that the soil and location were excellent for grape growing. The vineyard would eventually be classed as "super premium" and its shiraz grapes were used for Penfolds' flagship wine, Grange among others. It was another 10 years before Lindsay officially retired. Booth died in 1999 on 27 March.

One of his enduring legacies is the company he started, now renamed Booth Transport, which is still family owned, and now employs Lindsay's son, grandsons and great-grandchildren.
