= Intimate Stranger =

Intimate Stranger may refer to:

- Intimate stranger, a social concept

== Film and TV ==
- Intimate Strangers (1977 film), an American made-for-TV drama, also known as Battered
- Intimate Strangers (2004 film), a 2004 French film
- Intimate Strangers (2018 film), a 2018 South Korean film
- Intimate Strangers (miniseries), a 1981 Australian miniseries
- The Intimate Stranger (1947 film), an Australian film from director Roy Darling that was never completed
- The Intimate Stranger (1956 film), 1956 British drama film
- Intimate Strangers, a 1986 film directed by Robert Ellis Miller
- Intimate Stranger, a 1991 documentary directed by Alan Berliner
- Intimate Stranger, a 1991 thriller television film starring Debbie Harry
- "Intimate Stranger", a 1996 episode of the television series Xena: Warrior Princess

== Music ==
- Intimate Strangers, an album by Tom Scott
- "Intimate Strangers", a song by Suzi Quatro from the album Oh, Suzi Q.

== Stage ==
- The Intimate Strangers (play), a 1921 Broadway play by Booth Tarkington
