= Honest Hooves =

1946 Australian radio drama

Honest Hooves is a 1946 Australian radio drama with a background of the Melbourne Cup.

It was an episode of Radio Playhouse for Grace Gibson.

== Premise ==
"Stan Davis agreed to "pull" his horse, as a result of a discussion with Pug Shaw, known to be an unscrupulous racehorse owner. Mrs. Davis, disgusted, tried to reason with her husband, and hot words followed in a highly emotional scene."

== Cast ==
- John Saul
- Marion Johns
- Kevin Brennan
- John Gray
- George Hewlet
- Ward Leopold
- Richard Halliday
