= Kerry Norton-Smyser =

Australian actress (1927-2013)

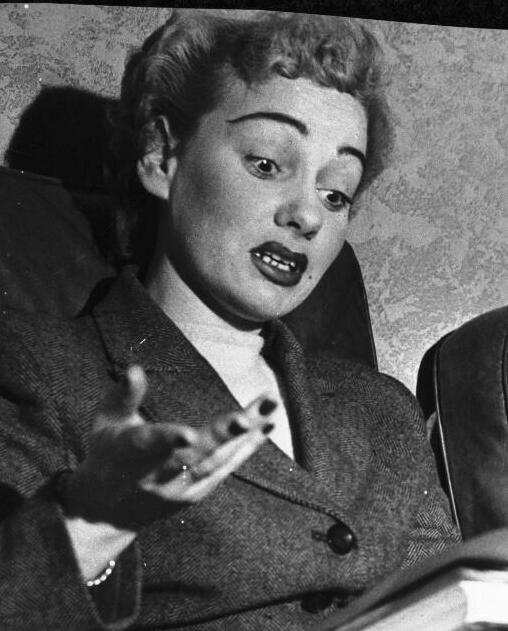
- Norton in the late 1940s
- Born: Norma-Jean Norton; 7 December 1927; Sydney, Australia
- Died: 29 December 2013 (aged 86); Bexley, New South Wales, Australia
- Occupation: Actress
- Years active: 1948–1954

Norma-Jean Smyser (née Norton; 7 December 1927 – 29 December 2013), better known as Kerry Norton-Smyser, was an Australian actress who performed in stage shows, night-club acts, and radio shows in the early 1950s in Australia, and is best-remembered as Australia's "Blondie".

== Biography ==
=== Early life ===
Kerry Norton was born as Norma-Jean Norton on 7 December 1927. She was an A-grade student throughout her school life, excelling in English and Grammar.

=== Career ===
In February 1947, Norton screen tested for a role in director Roy Darling's movie, The Intimate Stranger. Although filming began that April, the movie was never completed.

Her first stage appearance was a minor role in Garson Kanin's Born Yesterday in 1948 for J. C. Williamson at the Royal. At the same time when she was taking acting lessons at the Independent, and in 1949 she took part in the Independent's production of Father Malachy's Miracle. That same year she auditioned for Macquarie's radio station 2GB and gained an A-Grade pass, which meant she started acting for 2GB almost immediately.

That year she was in Kay Keavney's radio serial Nurse White; she also appeared on the radio as Diana Reed in Superman. She was in the Caltex Theater play Prison Without Bars, which starred Babs Mayhew, Peter Bathurst, and Betty McDowall. At the same time she was working as a secretary to 2GB writer Bob MacKinnon, typing his scripts as he dictated them. She said that anyone who wanted to make a career as an actress should have a permanent job until well established.

This secretarial stint came to an end early in 1950. On 2UE she won the important role of Angel White in Hagen's Circus, written by Max Afford; she was in episodes of I Hate Crime, starring Ken Wayne as Larry Kent; and she was part of the team working with comedian Mo McCackie in Cavalcade. For 2GB she was in the serial Kitty Foyle, and she had her first starring role in the Caltex Theater in Adam and Evelyne with Reg Goldsworthy. On stage, she replaced Betty Lucas, who was leaving for England, in One Wild Oat at the Palace Theatre. This was followed by Madam Louise. Both these light comedies were written by Vernon Sylvaine.

After the Sydney season, Norton toured in both of these productions to the King's Theatre, Melbourne. She then started working with Jack Davey in The Club Show, continuing to work with him for more than two years, when she went to America.

Important parts in radio plays continued in 1951: a lead in the Actor's Choice play A Star Reborn on 2UE; the General Motors Hour play He Came To Stay, starring Allan Trevor, and the Caltex play The Dark Corner, starring Neva Carr Glyn and Moray Powell on 2GB. On stage she acted with Hollywood comedian Mischa Auer in Benn Levy's comedy Springtime For Henry, which played at the Theatre Royal, Sydney in Sydney, toured New South Wales country towns, then played in Hobart, Tasmania. At the Independent, she appeared in Anna Lucasta, a play by Phillip Yordan, starring American actress Ellen Morgan.

Around this time, Norton reached what she considered the peak of her radio career. Ron Beck, former producer of the Colgate-Palmolive shows, had entered into production with his own company. He obtained scripts of Blondie, an American show based on Chic Young's comic strip of the same name, and set about producing an Australian version of them. Willie Fennell played Dagwood Bumstead, Blondie's rather put-upon husband, but competition for the title role was very keen. Norton won it from a large field of auditioning actresses. Blondie went to air in November 1951, but its run was not to be a long one, as the threat of legal action from the United States brought it to an abrupt end.

Norton did a good deal of radio work for the ABC: Anna in Clifford Odets' Golden Boy; Letta in Arthur Miller's Death of a Salesman, starring Edward Howell; roles in Rex Rienits' Wide Boy, Elmer Rice's Counselor-at-Law, and the serial Stranger Come In, written and produced by Max Afford. On stage she played Olive in John Van Druten's The Voice of the Turtle produced by Sydney John Kay for the Mercury Theatre, and at the Metropolitan Theatre she was in the satirical revue Merry-Go-Round, produced by Bill Orr, the forerunner of the Phillip Street Revues.

=== Personal life and death ===
On 8 March 1954, Norton married Jack Smyser, an executive from Pan American Airways. Later that month they went to the United States to live.

After the sudden death of her husband and later her son, Norton-Smyser returned to Australia, where she lived in Carlton, Sydney. She died in a care home in Bexley, New South Wales on 29 December 2013, at the age of 86.

== Reception ==
Tom Breen, theatre critic for the Sydney Sun, wrote in a derogatory manner about the production Ladies' Night in a Turkish Bath at the Empire Theatre in 1951, but when he came to discussing the cast, he noted: "Kerry Norton was curvacity itself, and her script delivery had a sure-fire quality about it that made her outstanding." Commenting on her performance in Anna Lucasta, Breen wrote: "Kerry Norton was noteworthy for her devastatingly real depiction of a waterfront harlot." Norton was thrilled with the a good notice, but said, "I don't know if I was real or not. I've never met a waterfront harlot."
