= Peter Gago =

Australian writer and wine-maker

Peter Gago AC
- Born: 25 April 1957 (age 69); Newcastle upon Tyne, England
- Citizenship: Australian
- Education: University of Melbourne; Roseworthy College
- Occupation: Winemaker
- Years active: 1989–present
- Employer: Penfolds
- Spouse: Gail Gago

Peter Gago AC (born 25 April 1957) is a British-Australian winemaker and author. Gago has been chief winemaker at Penfolds and custodian of Penfolds Grange since 2002, the most iconic Australian wine.

== Early life ==
Gago was born in Newcastle, England, where he lived until the age of six before emigrating to Australia, settling in Melbourne. He became a high school teacher of mathematics and chemistry in the early 1980s after graduating from the University of Melbourne with a Bachelor of Science. At age twenty-nine, he undertook a Bachelor of Applied Science (Oenology) degree at Roseworthy College, graduating as dux.

== Penfolds ==
Gago started a job with Penfolds Wines in 1989, initially producing sparkling wine before moving on to reds, and eventually being made Penfolds Red Wine Oenologist. Gago succeeded John Duval as Penfolds Chief Winemaker in 2002, becoming only the fourth person to hold the position since Max Schubert was first appointed in 1948. Gago has been involved with the market promotion of Penfolds wines since the early 1990s, travelling extensively to attend wine shows and conduct tastings and master classes.

On winemaking, he has said, "I would not say that my style is particularly evident in the winemaking, although I'm a firm believer in no filtration or fining, natural yeast, open-top fermenting and other noninvasive techniques. For me, it's about knowing when to interfere and when to stay out of the way".

== Awards ==
Gago was named 2005 Winemaker of the Year by Wine Enthusiast Magazine. He was named 2012 Winemakers’ Winemaker of the Year by Institute of Masters of Wine and international trade publication The Drinks Business.

== Personal life ==
He is married to Gail Gago, a former Labor member of the South Australian Legislative Council.

== Books ==
- Discovering Australian Wine : A Taster's Guide (1995), ISBN 0-646-22238-4
- Australian Wine : From the Vine to the Glass (1997), ISBN 0-646-31855-1
- Australian Wine : Styles and Tastes (2002), ISBN 0-9581605-0-3

The books were co-authored with Patrick Iland.

== See also ==
- List of wine personalities
