= Gladys Penfold Hyland =

Australian businesswoman and collector of antiques (1886–1974)

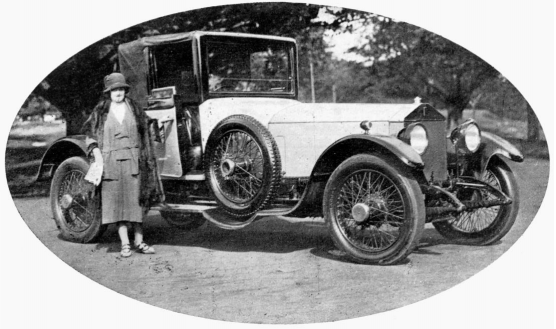
- with her Rolls-Royce two seater in 1922
- Born: Gladys Lethbridge; 17 March 1886; Albury, New South Wales, Australia
- Died: 11 July 1974 (aged 88); Ingleburn, New South Wales, Australia
- Occupation: businessperson
- Known for: antique collecting
- Spouse: Frank Astor Penfold Hyland

Gladys Penfold Hyland CBE born Gladys Lethbridge (17 March 1886 – 11 July 1974) was an Australian businesswoman and collector of antiques. She led Penfolds Wines from 1948 to public ownership in 1961. During her time Penfold's finest wine Grange Hermitage was developed.

== Life ==
Hyland was born in 1886 in Albury in New South Wales. She was the first daughter of Ada Margaret née Dawson and George Henry Lethbridge. Her parents were both born in Australia and her father was a sheriff's officer. She had a brief private education and she married Frank Astor Penfold Hyland in 1921.

She bought an Edwardian Mansion at Tofts Bay on Sydney's Elizabeth Bay. She had taken to her new husband's hobby of buying expensive objects. Their new home housed expensive paintings including examples by Millais, Gainsborough, George Romney J. M. W. Turner and Salomon van Ruysdael. They amassed a large quantity of antique silver objects and early porcelain figures made in England.

The first Rolls-Royce that she bought was a 1920 Rolls-Royce Silver Ghost and she appeared with it in July 1922 in "Australian Motor Owner" magazine. This car was not grey but after that one, other expensive cars followed, and they were all in her shade of grey.

In 1937 she joined the Australian Red Cross Society and from 1941 to 1947 she presided over the arrangements for Red Cross Day and during that time her committee raised two million pounds. In 1948 her husband died and her interest turned to the wine business. She became the chair of the board taking valuable advice from her husband's secretary who understood the business. Under her leadership the company tried to create the most expensive wines. She led the board until 1961 when the company went public. She was a director until 1963.

In the following year, she gave a collection valued at £200,000 to the National Gallery of South Australia. The collection was intended to be shown together and to be in memory of her husband. The gallery gained valuable examples of silver, furniture, porcelain and paintings. In 1966 she donated her Rolls-Royce Phantom V limousine to the Royal Blind Society. The grey car was from a limited edition of 516. In 1967 she became a Commander of the Order of the British Empire in the 1967 Birthday Honours.

Her home at Tofts Monk was demolished in 1970. Hyland died in Ingleburn in 1974. A 1951 bottle of wine from her time in charge at Penfold's sold for over $100,000 Australian dollars in 2020.
