= Circumstance (1922 film) =

1922 film

- Directed by: Lawson Harris
- Written by: Lawson Harris; Yvonne Pavis
- Produced by: Lawson Harris
- Starring: Lawson Harris; Yvonne Pavis
- Cinematography: Arthur Higgins
- Production company: Austral Super Films
- Distributed by: Austral Super Films
- Release date: 3 June 1922
- Running time: five reels
- Country: Australia
- Languages: Silent film English intertitles
- Budget: less than £800

Circumstance is a 1922 Australian silent film directed by Lawson Harris.

== Plot ==
A young woman is seduced and deserted by a man. She is rescued by a wealthy novelist, who wants to write a story about her life. The novelist's cousin proposes to the girl, only to realise she is the same girl he seduced and abandoned earlier in his life.

== Cast ==
- Lawson Harris as Richard Talbot
- Yvonne Pavis as Hazel Dalwood
- Carlton Max as Bernard St Clair
- Dot Pritchard as Jenny Taylor
- Irish Webster as Mrs Carson
- Cane Arthur
- David Edelsten
- Gordon Collingridge

== Production ==
The film was produced by two Americans, Lawson Harris and Yvonne Pavis. Harris came to Australia in 1920 to help Arthur Shirley make The Throwback and later ran an acting school. He was joined in 1922 by Pavis, who was an experienced Hollywood actor. Together they made three low budget feature films.

== Reception ==
The Sydney Truth said the film did "sensational" business in its first week.

The film was profitable, due in part to its low cost.
