= A Daughter of Australia (1922 film) =

1922 film

- Daybill poster
- Directed by: Lawson Harris
- Written by: Dulcie Deamer; Albert Goldie
- Produced by: Lawson Harris; Yvonne Pavis
- Starring: Lawson Harris
- Cinematography: Arthur Higgins
- Production company: Austral Super Films
- Distributed by: Austral Super Films
- Release date: 2 September 1922
- Running time: 7,000 feet
- Country: Australia
- Languages: Silent film English intertitles

A Daughter of Australia is a 1922 Australian silent film directed by Lawson Harris. It concerns a rich squatter, Arthur Fullerton (Charles Beethan), and his daughter, Barbara (Yvonne Pavis).

It is considered a lost film.

== Plot ==
A young English aristocrat, Hugh Ranleigh, falls for Barbara Fullerton, but is falsely accused of murdering a gambler in a night club and escapes to Australia. He finds work on a cattle station and falls for the squatter's daughter – who turns out to be Barbara. Eventually he proves his innocence.

== Cast ==
- Lawson Harris as Hugh Ranleigh
- Yvonne Pavis as Barbara Fullerton
- Charles Beetham as Mr Fullerton
- Charles Villiers
- Dorothy Hawtree
- Gilbert Emery as Jimmy
- J.P. O'Neill as Irishman
- Lilian Tate

== Production ==
The film was shot for a low budget on location in Sydney, with scenes at Ascot racecourse and the Royal Easter Agricultural Show. Contrary to the experiences of many local filmmakers, authorities were keen to give the producers permission to film in public places. A shoot out was filmed in Martin Place during Sydney's rush hour which caused a commotion, and leading to two extras being injured.

Scenes were also shot at a sheep station, Dalkeith, and on a ferry in the Sydney heads.

Marie Lorraine made her film debut in the cast.
