= Leslie Penfold Hyland =

Australian businessman and golfer

Herbert Leslie Penfold Hyland (4 March 1875 – 6 May 1940) was a director of Penfolds Wines and amateur sportsman, winning the South Australian amateur golf championship in 1905 and 1906.

== Personal life ==
Herbert Leslie Hyland was born on 4 March 1875, the son of Thomas Francis Hyland and Mary Georgina Anne Penfold, the only child of Dr. Christopher Rawson Penfold, the founder of Penfolds. He later adopted the name, Penfold Hyland. He married Edith Mary Miller on 30 April 1900, which marriage ended in divorce in 1920. He was born in Victoria but moved to South Australia in late 1904. He died on 6 May 1940 and was survived by two sons and a daughter.

== Golf ==
Hyland was an amateur golfer. In 1901 he was runner-up in the Victorian Amateur Championship, 19 strokes behind Walter Carre Riddell. In July 1904, he won the Surrey Hills Gentlemen's Championship. Over 36 holes he was 4 down to bogey, 3 ahead of Michael Scott, who was 7 down. In September, he was runner-up to Scott in the first Australian Open and the following month was again runner-up to Scott in the Victorian Amateur Championship.

Soon after moving to South Australia, Hyland was runner-up to Tom Cheadle in the South Australian Amateur Championship in 1905, losing 10 & 9 in the 36-hole final. In 1906 he won the South Australian Amateur Championship, beating Bill Gunson in the final. The two met again in the 1907 final, with Hyland winning 6 & 5.

== Team appearances ==
- Australian Men's Interstate Teams Matches (representing South Australia): 1905, 1907, 1908, 1910
