= Campbell Mattinson =

Australian editor, writer and critic (born 1968)

Campbell Mattinson (born 1968) is an Australian novelist and a leading Australian wine critic. He is a former editor of Halliday Magazine and was the chief editor of the Halliday Wine Companion book for the 2024 and 2025 editions. When James Halliday announced his retirement from the Halliday Wine Companion business Mattinson stepped down to concentrate on his own website.

In June 2021 Mattinson's debut novel We Were Not Men was published by Fourth Estate.

Mattinson's biography of one of the pioneers of the Australian wine industry, Maurice O'Shea, titled "Wine Hunter" was described by wine writer James Halliday as "One of the most remarkable wine books to come my way" in his weekly column in the Weekend Australian newspaper. Australian wine critic Max Allen wrote that "this is the best book on wine to be published in Australia for many, many years" in The Australian Magazine.

His Big Red Wine Book was published by Hardie Grant Books in May 2008. Second and third editions were released in June 2009 and 2010.

In July 2020 Mattinson's short film Dissatisfaction won the Best Regional Short Film category at the St Kilda Film Festival.

Mattinson is the only person to win Australia's top wine writing award – the Wine Press Club Wine Communicator of the Year – more than once. Both of his wins, in 2004 and 2006, were awarded by the NSW Wine Press Club, the predecessor to the Wine Communicators of Australia.

Mattinson is married to author Thalia Kalkipsakis

== Books and media ==
- Wine Hunter: The Man Who Changed Australian Wine, (2006) ISBN 978-0-7336-2125-3
- The Big Red Wine Book, (2008, Hardie Grant Books)
- The Big Red Wine Book, (2009/10, Hardie Grant Books)
- Thin Skins, (2011, Stirling US)
- The Wine Hunter: The Life Story of Australia's First Great Winemaker, (2015) ISBN 978-174379127-1
- We Were Not Men, (2021) ISBN 9781460759523

== Awards ==
- 2020 – Winner Best Regional Short Film St Kilda Film Festival
- 2016 – Winner Chairman's Award Louis Roederer International Wine Writers' Awards
- 2013 – Winner Best Features Writer Australian Wine Communicator Awards
- 2006 – Winner NSW Wine Press Club "Wine Communicator Award"
- 2005 – R/U NSW Wine Press Club "Wine Communicator Award"
- 2004 – Winner NSW Wine Press Club "Wine Communicator Award"
- 1996 – Winner Best Australian Sports Writing Award
- 1995 – Winner Independent Monthly Young Writer of the Year

== See also ==
- Australian wine
