= Tony America =

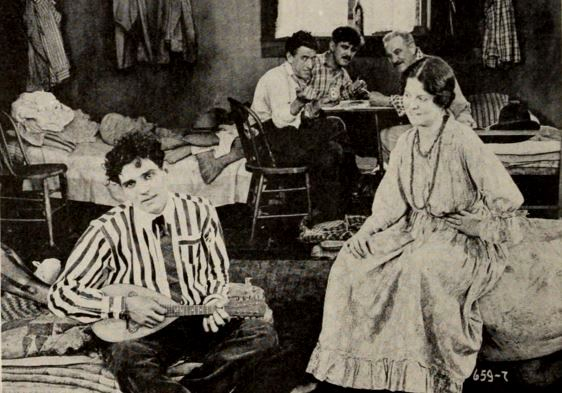
- Directed by: Thomas N. Heffron
- Screenplay by: Doris Schroeder; Evelyn Campbell
- Starring: Francis McDonald; Marie Pavis; Ray Godfrey
- Cinematography: C.H. Wales
- Distributed by: Triangle Film Corporation
- Release date: October 6, 1918 (USA)

Tony America is a 1918 U.S. film directed by Thomas N. Heffron and starring Francis McDonald.

== Plot ==
A poor but optimistic young fruit peddler from Genoa is lured to America by his boss; once he arrives, he finds himself trapped in a stormy marriage with an unfaithful wife.

== Cast ==
- Francis McDonald as Tony America
- Marie Pavis as Rosa Picciano
- Ray Godfrey as Mamie Dean
- Dorothy Giraci as Giulia
- Alice Davenport as Mrs. Picciano
- Harold Holland as Hans
