= William Constable (designer) =

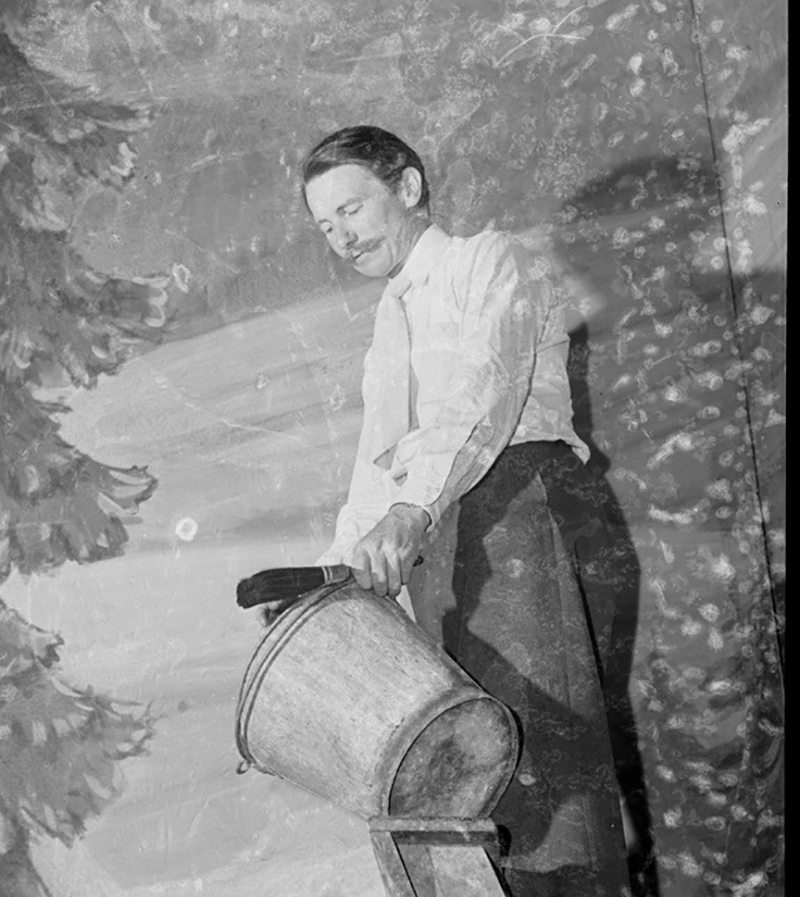
- William Constable set designer, Sydney, 1953, by Ron Iredale
- Born: William Henry Archibald Constable; 8 March 1906; Bendigo, Victoria, Australia
- Died: 22 August 1989.
- Known for: Painting, Scenic design
- Notable work: Les Amants eternels (The Eternal Lovers) (1952), Symphonie fantastique (1954), Long John Silver (1954), The Trials of Oscar Wilde (1960), Dr. Who and the Daleks (1965)

William Henry Archibald Constable (8 March 1906 – 22 August 1989) was an Australian film and stage designer, painter, cartoonist, printmaker and illustrator.

== Biography ==
William Constable was born in Eaglehawk a suburb of Bendigo, Victoria. Constable was raised with two younger brothers in the family of the Reverend Archibald Henry Constable, rector of St. John's Church of England. Constable's childhood home still standing next to the church in Malmsbury, a small town in regional Victoria, Australia. Trained as apprentice electrical fitter at the Jolimont Workshops he worked for Victorian Railways. He took watercolour lessons from Meta Townsend. In 1926 he was laid off from the position, he left for England, where studied in London's Saint Martin's School of Art. At nights, he was involved with the most advanced experimental theatres in England, which set his passion for life.

On return to Australia in 1930s, Constable worked on several commercial design projects, and was noticed after his very first theatrical commission in 1933, the cubist stage decorations for the Gregan McMahon Players’ production of Bridie's Jonah and the Whale at the Garrick in South Melbourne. The play was directed by Alec Coppel. The press claimed that the "production will be notable for the unusual settings by William Constable, a young artist who recently reached Melbourne from abroad ... Constable's stage settings are great fun. They are simple and attractive." Constable took several commissions to create promotional visuals for Ford, Shell, some Government departments and even designed the float.

In 1940s Constable illustrated Sir Eugene Goossens’ vision of his "dream child" Opera House. The two published an article with the visual proposal to build an Australian National Theatre in the style of a Greek amphitheatre built at Bennelong Point (4) With Constable's departure for Europe and the scandalous conclusion of Goossen's career in Australia, the proposed design was forgotten along with a few others of the time. Constable's artwork is not held in the Opera House archives.

Ironically, Constable's older son, Bill Junior, was involved in the production of the documentary 'Autopsy on a Dream' re-discovered in 2016: https://www.youtube.com/watch?v=cuHtP8OFOIA. The film contains photographs and camera work of Bill Constable Jnr. As an ABC cameraman, his job was to make video/photo recording of day by day building of what is now the iconic view of Sydney.

Constable and Edouard Borovansky met in the 1940s, beginning a lifelong creative partnership and friendship. As scenic director of the Borovansky Ballet Company for 15 years, Constable was behind most productions as a designer and a painter. Frank Salter described Borovansky and Constable working together "in total harmony over his [Constable] entire Australian career." Constable "was always fascinated by Boro's method of working with him" and often was entertained by Boro's comments, such as "You clever bastard, Bill; you've realised exactly what I had in mind". (2)

The 1950 World Premier of Australian ballet Corroboree with the Rock motif on the backdrop designed by Constable was a milestone for Constable's career. This minimalistic composition accurately translated the desert of Central Australia. He used bold organic shapes, strong details, variation in textures and contrasting colours. The inclusion of a full solar eclipse added drama and mystery, and possibly represented the everlasting life cycle. The highlighted top of the stone is the visual focus of the composition, where a pastel pink sandy foreground is the centre of action during the dance. The fine lines of dried trees, a ritual pole and still sand waves make a statement of human presence and support the greatness of the rock.

Constable was production designer and Art Director for Long John Silver, which was shot in Sydney in 1954. The film was produced by Joseph Kaufman at Pagewood Studios and starred Robert Newton. He also worked on the subsequent television series The Adventures of Long John Silver in 1956-1957.

Constable created almost 160 dramas, operas (16 of these for Sir Eugene Goossens), ballets (mostly for the Borovansky Ballet) and a long list of films with his artistic abilities and impeccable taste as claimed by Sydney Ure.

The designer illustrated books and had several commissions for theaters. In 1952 he produced two murals, one for the lower foyer of the Theatre Royal which was partially demolished to clear way for the current ML Center. And another for The Empire Theatre on Quay Street in Sydney in 1953, that was destroyed by a fire in 1970s.

After departure from Australia again in 1955 for England, he produced sets and costumes for the only ballet by Sir Noël Coward London Morning and then dedicated himself to design for cult movies such as Taste of Fear, The Hellions, The Skull, Doctor Who, and Casino Royal. The village built for "Long Ships" set has become a tourist attraction in Yugoslavia. His sets and for The Trials of Oscar Wilde has won him Medallion for the Best Art-Direction in Moscow 1960 Film Festival.

The production of the film Lord Jim took Constable to Cambodia in 1963 where he extended his stay for a few months to paint. His collection of prints and paintings on Cambodia was exhibited across Australia and in England. Designer himself considered it another milestone after Corroborree.

Constable returned to Melbourne in 1972 to design and supervise the production of the curtain for Her Majesty Theatre in Melbourne, which was recently located in Queensland.

Paintings of Australia and prints of Great barrier Reef prints produced by Constable in 1970s were extensively exhibited across the country.

William Constable was significant in retaining great traditions of style and perfection that were established by the Ballets Russes and its artists. His legacy in stage decor, his input into Australian theatrical design and according to Frank Van Straten, his "most important legacy, however, is the generation of Australian theatre makers who admired and loved him, and to whom he passed on his vast knowledge and his deep love of theatre" (5).

1 Meta Townsend, wife of Reginald Sturgess, Victorian Art Society members, Australian artists, Meta Townsend's family lived in Malmsbury 2 Salter, Frank, Borovansky, the man who made Australian ballet, Wild Cat Press, 1980 3 Introduction to Catalogue of Exhibition, Sydney Ure Smith, O.B.E., President, Society of artists 4 Eugene Goossens, How Long Before Our Opera House Dream Comes True? The Sunday Herald, 17 April 1949. https://trove.nla.gov.au/newspaper/page/1019234 5 Van Straten, Frank, The Sorcerer, 2007

Sedneva, Olga, "Corroboree: White Fella Vision," original thesis for Master of Art Curatorship held by Schaeffer Library of the Power Institute Foundation for Art & Visual Culture, the University of Sydney

== Select credits ==
- Jonah the Whale (1934) – play – Garrick Theatre, Melbourne
- The Sword Sung (1937) – play – New Theatre, Sydney
- Vltava (1940) – ballet – Borovansky Ballet
- Pas classique (1940) – ballet – Borovansky Ballet
- Autumn Leaves (1940) – ballet – Borovansky Ballet
- Ladies in Retirement (1940) – play – with Marie Ney for J.C. Williamson Ltd
- Private Lives by Noël Coward (1941) – play – with Marie Ney for J.C. Williamson Ltd
- No Time for Comedy (1941) – – play – with Marie Ney for J.C. Williamson Ltd
- En Saga (1941) – ballet – Borovansky Ballet
- Les Sylphides (1942) – ballet – Borovansky Ballet
- Facade (1943) – ballet – Borovansky Ballet
- Giselle (1944) – ballet – Borovansky Ballet
- Terra Australis (1946)- ballet – Borovansky Ballet
- Scheherazade (1946) – ballet – Borovansky Ballet
- The Intimate Stranger (1947) – abandoned film
- The Black Swan (1949) – ballet – Borovansky Ballet
- Corroboree (1950) – ballet – National Theatre Ballet
- La Boutique fantasque (1951) – ballet – Borovansky Ballet
- The Outlaw (1951) – ballet – Borovansky Ballet
- The Sleeping Princess (1951) – ballet – Borovansky Ballet
- Judith (1951) – opera – debut performance by Joan Sutherland
- Carmen (1951) – opera – NSW Opera Company
- A Masked Ball (1951) – opera
- Il Seraglio (1951) – opera
- Les Amants eternels (The Eternal Lovers) (1952) – ballet – Borovansky Ballet
- Symphonie fantastique (1954) – ballet – Borovansky Ballet
- Prince Igor (1954) – ballet – Borovansky Ballet
- Long John Silver (1954) – film
- The Adventures of Long John Silver (1954–55) – TV series
- Medea (1955) – opera – Australian Elizabethan Theatre Trust
- Fifth Symphony: Les Presages (1955) – ballet – Borovansky Ballet
- Francesca da Rimini (1955) – ballet – Borovansky Ballet
- Corrida (1956) – ballet – Borovansky Ballet
- London Calling by Noël Coward (1959) – ballet
- The Trials of Oscar Wilde (1960) – film
- The Hellions (1961) – film
- The Long Ships (1963) – film
- Lord Jim (1965) – film
- Gonks Go Beat (1965) – film
- Dr. Terror's House of Horrors (1965) – film
- Dr. Who and the Daleks (1965) – film
- Boris Godunov (1966) – opera – Australian opera
- The Deadly Bees (1967) – film
- Can Heironymus Merkin Ever Forget Mercy Humppe and Find True Happiness? (1969)- film
- The Terrornauts (1967) – film
- Salt and Pepper (1968) – film
- Scream and Scream Again (1970) – film
- The Mind of Mr. Soames (1970) – film
- Rashomon (1973) – play – Melbourne
