= Sunshine Sally =

1922 film

- Directed by: Lawson Harris
- Written by: John Cosgrove
- Produced by: Lawson Harris; Yvonne Pavis
- Starring: John Cosgrove; Yvonne Pavis
- Cinematography: Arthur Higgins
- Release date: 16 December 1922
- Running time: 5,000 feet
- Country: Australia
- Languages: Silent film English intertitles

Sunshine Sally is a 1922 Australian silent film directed by Lawson Harris set in the Sydney suburb of Woolloomooloo. Most of the movie survives today.

== Plot ==
Sal and Tottie are sacked from their jobs in a laundry, then go on a picnic with friends Skinny and Spud. Skinny and Spud are both romantically interested in Sal but she spurns their attentions.

Sal is rescued in the surf Coogee Beach by wealthy lifeguard Basil Stanton and taken to his family home in Potts Point to recuperate. Sal and Basil fall in love and get married. Spud and Skinny are arrested for drunkenness and reform. Spud marries Tottie and Skinny marries a woman from the Salvation Army.

== Cast ==
- Yvonne Pavis as Sal
- Joy Revelle as Tottie Faye
- John Cosgrove as "Spud" Murphy
- Dinks Patterson as "Skinny" Smith
- Mrs. Hutton as Katie Smith
- J.P. O'Neill as Bill Smith
- Sheila Moore as Mrs. Constance Stanton
- Lionel Lunn as Basil Stanton
- Mervyn Barrington as James Stanton
- Maude Ranier as Salvation Army Woman

== Production ==
The film was shot in October and November 1922 under the title Winnie of Woolloomooloo.

Vaudevillean Dinks Patterson, of Dinks and Onkus, made his film debut.

Some studio interiors were shot late at night because John Cosgrove was appearing on stage each day in the city. Scenes were shot at Long Bay Gaol.

One of the actors quit during filming.

== Reception ==
The movie was not a success at the box office and Harris and Pavis soon left Australia to return to the US. However film writers Andrew Pike and Ross Cooper praised the film:

It is clearly a work of confident professionalism, offering a perceptive portrait of a distinctively Australian lifestyle. The American star, Yvonne Pavis, and her American director, Lawson Harris, had not only sympathy and clarity of vision but also the ability to express themselves effectively on film, creating credible characters and capturing thoroughly colloquial dialogue in the inter titles.

One reviewer said it was the "best picture" made in Australia.
