= Daughter of the East =

1924 film

- Directed by: Roy Darling
- Written by: Adam Tavlaridi
- Produced by: Adam Tavlaridi
- Starring: Dorothy Hawtree
- Cinematography: Tasman Higgins
- Production company: Blue Bird Films
- Distributed by: Paramount Pictures
- Release date: 4 October 1924
- Country: Australia
- Languages: Silent film English intertitles
- Box office: £50

Daughter of the East, also known as The Boy of the Dardanelles, is a 1924 Australian silent film directed by Roy Darling. It is considered a lost film, with only 25 seconds surviving.

== Plot ==
Harry Wharton is born of English parents in Turkey. Despite being engaged to a woman back in England, he falls in love with an orphaned Armenian girl, Marian. A Turkish pasha also loves Marian and kidnaps her. Wharton tries to rescue her but is captured just as England and Turkey declare war on each other. He escapes disguised as a Greek and joins the Australians at the Gallipoli Campaign.

After the war Wharton finds Marian who has been traumatised by the war. He helps her recover and his fiancée gives him his freedom, enabling Wharton and Marian to be married.

== Production ==
The film was financed by Adam Tavlradi, a Greek cafe owner keen to show a film demonstrating the contribution of Greeks to the British war effort. It was shot in and around Sydney in mid 1923, with battles scenes shot on Maroubra Beach. It was previewed under the title The Boy of the Dardanelles.

== Release ==
As he had with his first film, The Lust for Gold (1922), Darling had great trouble getting the film released, but eventually managed to make a deal with Paramount. However box office response was not strong and Darling only received £50 in returns.

Only 25 seconds of the movie survive today.

== Cast ==
- Dorothy Hawtree
- Paul Eden
- Catherine Tearle
- Charles Villiers
- Adam Tavalridi
