= Mary Penfold =

British-born Australian winemaker (1820–1895)

- Born: Mary Holt; 1820; Edmonton, London, United Kingdom
- Died: 1895 (aged 74/75); Brighton, Victoria, Australia
- Occupations: Businesswoman, winemaker
- Known for: Co-founder of Penfolds Winery
- Spouse: Christopher Rawson Penfold

Mary Penfold, née Holt (1820–1895), was an English businesswoman, pioneering winemaker and co-founder of Penfolds Winery.

== Early life ==
Mary Holt, born 1820 in Edmonton, London, was the only daughter of a London medical practitioner, Dr Thomas Holt.

On 26 Mary 1835, Mary Holt married Christopher Rawson Penfold and they settled in Brighton, England.

At the age of 24, Mary emigrated to Australia with her husband who was a physician, their young daughter Georgina, and their employee Ellen Timbrell, who is recorded to have served not only as the family's maid and Georgina's nurse but also as assistant winemaker. They arrived in the colony of South Australia on 18 June 1844 on board the barque Taglioni in the first decade of the colony's establishment.

Christopher and Mary Penfold purchased 500 acres of land at Magill, then known as Mackgill, for £1,200. When they arrived at their property in August 1844, they built a small timber shack which was replaced a year later with a stone cottage called The Grange. They named the cottage after Mary's former home in England. They established a surgery in the dining room of the cottage. Around their home they farmed large quantities of grain, and planted a vineyard with vine cuttings that they brought with them from France.

== Winemaking ==
While Dr Penfold worked long hours setting up his practice, Mary supervised the running of the house, garden, the farm, the vineyard and winery. The first wines were prescribed as tonic wines for patients, particularly those suffering from anaemia.

Penfold kept many records, including a diary and a daybook, that outlined her work managing the farm and developing the Magill Estate; however, historically, the development of the winery has been attributed solely to her husband. Similarly, many historical records suggest that upon her husband's death in 1870, their son-in-law, Thomas Hyland, took control of the business; however, the records Mary Penfold left behind demonstrate her continued control of the company.

It was reported that, upon Christopher's death, Hyland suggested that she had no choice but to sell the Penfolds winery and draw a pension. Mary responded by mailing her son-in-law a detailed financial ledger and business forecast, created in her own hand. Hyland went on to become a business partner.

Everything she knew about wine, she taught herself, insisting on having the grapes blended to her own taste.

In 1874, The Register reported on a visit to Magill that:

"the winehouses and vineyard belonging to Mrs. Penfold. of Magill, ... Mrs. Penfold makes but four varieties of wine, namely, sweet and dry red, and sweet and dry white. The work is done under Mrs. Penfold's personal direction, not in conformity to any fixed or definite rule, but according to her judgement and taste".

The article also indicates the "large market for her wines in Victoria, Tasmania, and New Zealand" and even India

By 1881, the business had expanded such that 107,000 gallons of wine were made at Magill. This was equal to one-third of all the wine stored in South Australia at that time. The same year Penfolds received a gold medal at the Paris Exhibition for their wine.

Amongst Mary's reported possessions was a spyglass, which she used to keep an eye on the work force. Mary would often be seen marshalling the vineyard upon a white mare.

In 1884, at the age of 68, Mary Penfold retired from active involvement in the winery. During her tenure, Mary engaged in experimentation, explored new methods of wine production and looked into ways of combating diseases like phylloxera.

An obituary in The Adelaide Advertiser indicates that Mary Penfold died in 1895 in Brighton, Victoria at the home of her daughter, Georgina, and son-in-law Thomas Hyland, with whom she had lived in the last few years of her life. Penfold's body was transported back to Adelaide to be buried at St George's Cemetery in Magill, near her former home of The Grange, the original site of Penfolds vineyard.
