= The Lust for Gold =

1922 film

- Directed by: Roy Darling
- Starring: Dorothy Hawtree; Gilbert Emery; Charles Villiers
- Production company: Olympic Films
- Release date: 1922
- Country: Australia
- Languages: Silent film English intertitles
- Budget: £900

The Lust for Gold is a 1922 Australian silent film directed by Roy Darling.

== Release ==
Despite starring several well-known actors, including Gilbert Emery of The Sentimental Bloke (1919), the film only received a limited release. Darling invested £400 of his own money to make the movie and lost it all, causing him to complain at the 1927 Royal Commission into the Australian Film Industry about unfair exhibition practices in Australia. Darling later made Daughter of the East (1924) with Dorothy Hawtree, star of this film.

== Cast ==
- Dorothy Hawtree
- Gilbert Emery
- Charles Villiers
