= Law or Loyalty =

1926 film

- Directed by: Lawson Harris
- Written by: Lois Zellner
- Starring: Lawson Harris
- Distributed by: J C Williamsons (Australia)
- Release date: 1926
- Country: USA
- Languages: Silent film English intertitles

Law or Loyalty is a 1926 silent film directed by Lawson Harris. It was set in Canada.

== Plot ==
Davis French, a member of the Northwest Mounted Police, receives orders to relocate to the coast, preventing him from fulfilling his promise to marry his beloved, Jean Dupres. Despite Davis's attempt to communicate via letter, Jean remains unaware of his intentions. Arriving at their designated rendezvous alone and destitute, Jean finds herself compelled to seek refuge with a shady character known only as the "Timber Wolf." When Timber Wolf assaults Jean in her cabin, Pierre Santoi, who has developed affection for her, intervenes and fatally wounds Timber Wolf with a knife. Pierre flees into the wilderness and encounters Davis, an old acquaintance, who reluctantly apprehends him. Davis escorts Pierre back for trial and plays a crucial role in securing a verdict of justifiable homicide. Eventually, Davis is reunited with Jean, while Pierre embarks on a journey toward the untamed frontier.

== Cast ==
- Lawson Harris as Pierre Santol
- Richard Sutherland as the Timber Wolf
- David French
- Dolores Dorian
