= Maurice O'Shea (winemaker) =

Australian winemaker (1897–1956)

Maurice George O'Shea (13 June 1897 – 5 May 1956) was one of Australia's most respected winemakers, and is often referred to as the father of Australia's modern winemaking. Maurice was the son of Irish born wine and spirit merchant John Augustus O'Shea (died 1912) and Leontine Frances, née Beaucher.

== Life ==
Maurice completed his secondary schooling at Riverview College. He then studied winemaking at Montpellier University and, in 1917, enrolled at the Institut National Agronomique Paris-Grignon where he studied viticulture and oenology He returned to Australia in 1920.

O'Shea married Marcia Singer Fuller on 2 December 1925 at St Peter's Anglican Church, Hamilton.

Maurice O'Shea died on 5 May 1956 of lung cancer even though he did not smoke. He is buried at Gore Hill Cemetery, Sydney.

A biography of Maurice O'Shea was written in 2006 by wine writer Campbell Mattinson.

== Winemaking ==
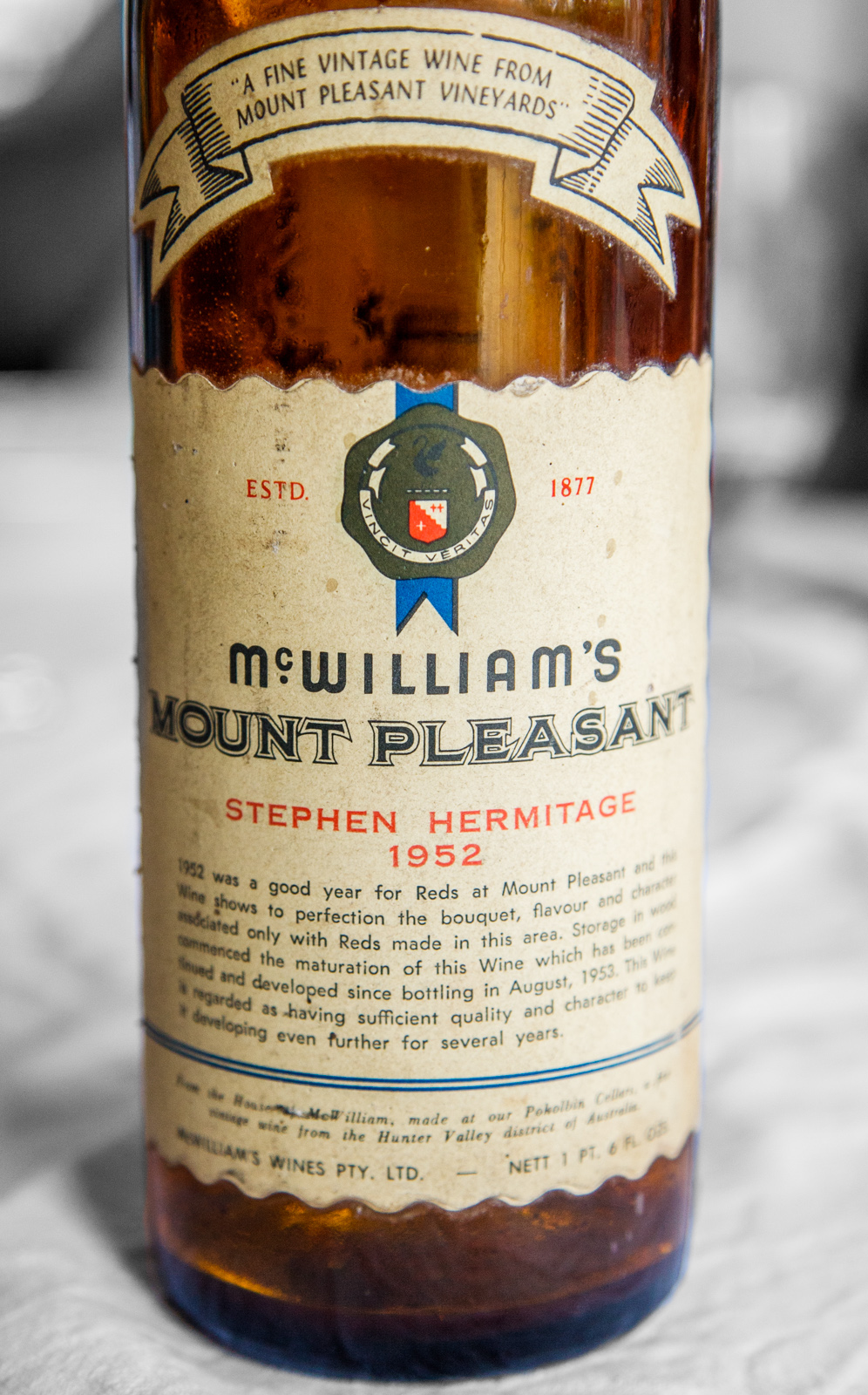
An empty bottle of 1952 Hunter Valley "Stephen Hermitage" Shiraz made by Maurice O'Shea

In 1925, Maurice began making wine on his family's vineyard, which he named Mount Pleasant, in Pokolbin in the Hunter Valley in New South Wales.

In 1932, O'Shea sold half of this business to McWilliam's Wines. O'Shea stayed on as Manager and Director of the new subsidiary Mount Pleasant Wines. In 1941 he sold the remaining half of the business and stayed on as manager and winemaker.

Maurice O'Shea named many of his wines after his friends, rather than the more orthodox method of naming them with a Bin Number of letter. The names included "Elizabeth", "Henry" and "George". Mount Pleasant 'Elizabeth' Semillon is still made.

O'Shea most often made very small quantities of wine, often only one 2,275 litre cask.

== Recognition ==
The Maurice O'Shea Award was inaugurated in 1990, and is awarded biyearly. Those honoured include Max Schubert in 1990, Wolf Blass in 2000 and Ray Beckwith in 2006.
