= Georgie Sterling =

Australian actress

- Georgie Sterling in her stint in TV soap opera Sons and Daughters in 1986 as May Walters
- Born: c. 1913; Dunedin, New Zealand
- Died: 2008 (age 94–95); Newport, New South Wales
- Education: Trinity College London
- Occupation: Actress
- Years active: 1936–1992
- Known for: Taurus Rising; Sons and Daughters
- Spouse: John Saul

Georgie Sterling (c. 1913 – 2008) was a New Zealand–born Australian actress, initially slated to become a doctor, she trained for her acting career at Trinity College London in England, she was noted for her work in radio and television, especially in TV films and serials, although she also appeared in theatre, in an acting career spanning over a 55-year period.

Sterling was in her early career styled as Australia's Ginger Rogers, but with blonde hair and curls and started her career in the 1930s appearing in the film Rangle River starring Hollywood actor Victor Jory and also in 1941 in That Certain Something, she featured in theatre he preferred genre in the early 1940s and by the late 1950s in the new media of television, including appearing in a TV movie version of Hamlet. In serials she played Isabella Drysdale in the ill-fated series Taurus Rising but is possibly best known for her role as May Walters in Sons and Daughters. She also appeared in Homicide, Matlock Police and several roles in A Country Practice including centenarian Polly Waterford.

== Personal life ==
She was married to fellow actor and radio producer John Saul, who died in 1979, both lived in Newport, New South Wales, after her husband's death she continued living independently at the property, she her self died there in late 2008 and the property was sold in early 2009, the new owners having subdivided the land, kept Georgie's cottage, whilst adding a new property to the back portion of the estate in 2014, which was sold in August 2017. went up for sale, she was said to have been aged in her 90's when she died.

== Selected filmography ==
=== Theater ===
see also: AusStage database

| Title | Year | Role | Playwright | Type |
|---|---|---|---|---|
| Point Valaine | 1942 | | Noël Coward | Theatre - spoken word - comedy/drama |
| The Importance of Being Ernest | 1942-1943 | actor | Oscar Wilde | spoken word (theatre) | |
| You Can't Take it With You | 1943 | actor | George Kaufman | spoken word - theatre |
| Love is a Mist | 1944 | actor | Kenneth Horne | Theatre / comedy |
| Little Lamb's Eat Ivy | 1949 | actor | Noel Langley | Theatre spoken word / comedy |
| The Yearling | 1949 | Ma Baxter | Marjorie Kinnan Rawlings | Play |
| Hamlet | 1959 | actor | Shakespeare | Play / Filmed for ABC television |

=== Film ===
| Year | Title | Role | Type |
|---|---|---|---|
| 1936 | Rangle River | Minna | Australian Western |
| 1941 | That Certain Something | Blanche Wright | Musical film |
| 1983 | The Wild Duck | Caretaker | Feature film |

=== Television ===
| Year | Title | Role | Type |
|---|---|---|---|
| 1958 | The Multi-Coloured Umbrella | Gloria | TV film |
| 1958 | Sorry, Wrong Number | Mrs Stevenson | Short film |
| 1959 | Hamlet | Gertrude | TV film |
| 1959 | One Bright Day | Sheila Prescott | TV film |
| 1960 | Stormy Petrel | Guest role: Mrs. King/Mrs King | TV series, 2 episodes |
| 1966 | Armchair Theatre | Guest role: Mrs. Parker | TV series, 1 episode |
| 1968-1975 | Homicide | Guest roles: Miss Murphy/Linda Richardson/Emma Canker/Martha Hayes-Manning/Kay Barlow | TV series, 5 episodes |
| 1972; 1974 | Division 4 | Guest roles: Lucille Lester/Mrs. Millard | TV series, 2 episodes |
| 1972 | The Tony Hancock Special | Miss Bunny Bancroft | TV Special |
| 1975 | Matlock Police | Guest role: May O'Brien | TV series, 1 episode |
| 1976 | King's Men | Guest role | TV series, 1 episode |
| 1982 | The Don Lane Show | Guest as herself with 'Taurus Rising' cast: Andrew Clarke, Alan Cassell, Diane Craig | TV series, 1 episode |
| 1982 | Taurus Rising | Regular role: Elizabeth Drysdale | TV series |
| 1983-1988 | A Country Practice | Guest roles: Polly Waterford/Irene Walters/Emily White/da Chaffey/Lola Brown | TV series, 15 episodes |
| 1986 | Sons and Daughters | Regular role: May Walters | TV series, 69 episodes |
| 1988 | Barracuda aka The Rocks | Mrs. Vaughan | TV pilot/film |
| 1989 | Bodysurfer | Mrs. Tramble | ABC TV miniseries, 2 episodes |
| 1990 | Home and Away | Guest role: Mrs. Gibbs | TV series, 1 episode |
| 1992 | E Street | Recurring role: Thelma Potts | TV series, 4 episodes |
