= Yvonne Pavis =

American actress

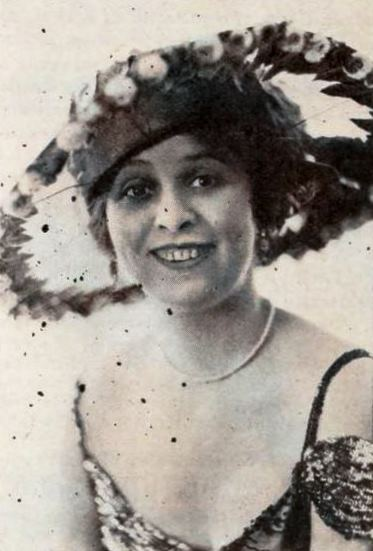
- Born: Marie Posener; 12 May 1890
- Died: Unknown
- Other names: Marie Pavis
- Occupation: Actress
- Spouses: Lawson Harris (m. 1924; div. 1925); John William Murray

Yvonne Pavis (12 May 1890-??) was an English-born actress, writer, and producer. She began acting in Hollywood in 1910 with the Vitagraph Company, occasionally acting under the name Marie Pavis. In 1922, she went to Australia and formed a production company with Lawson Harris. After a brief time as The Yvonne Pavis Production Company, the company changed its name to Harris Austral Super Films and produced three features. She returned to the United States in 1924. She and Harris married, but divorced in 1925.

In 1921, Pavis was granted a divorce from John William Murray, who had wed two women while still married to her.

== Partial filmography ==
- The Trail of the Octopus (1919)
- Tony America (1918)
- The Walk-Offs (1920)
- An Arabian Knight (1920)
- Silk Hosiery (1920)
- The First Born (1921)
- Circumstance (1922) - actor, writer, producer
- A Daughter of Australia (1922) - actor, producer
- Sunshine Sally (1922) - actor, producer.
