= Lawson Harris =

American actor

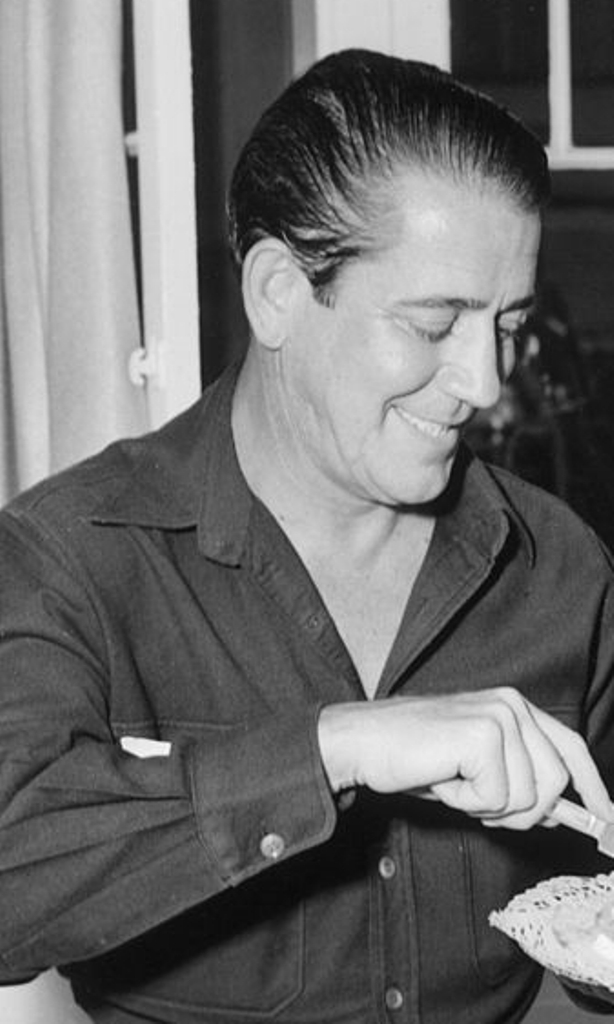
- Lawson Harris in 1948
- Born: June 30, 1897; Vanderburgh County, Indiana, U.S.
- Died: March 31, 1948 (aged 50); Los Angeles County, California, U.S.
- Resting place: Los Angeles National Cemetery
- Occupations: Director, actor, producer, writer
- Years active: 1922–1926
- Spouses: Yvonne Pavis (m. 1924; div. 1925) Dolores Johnson (m. 1925; div. 1931)
- Children: John Derek

Lawson Harris (June 30, 1897 – March 31, 1948) was an American director, actor, producer, and writer who made a number of films in Australia. He came to Australia originally at the behest of Arthur Shirley to work as production manager on The Throwback (1920) and stayed out there for a number of years. Harris was the father of actor and director John Derek.

== Biography ==
Harris was born on June 30, 1897, in Evansville, Vanderburgh County, Indiana, the son of William James Harris (1874–1908) and Elizabeth Bettie Hawley (1877–?).

He moved to Australia in 1920 with Arthur Shirley and set up an acting school.

In 1921, he announced he would make a film about the arrival of the Jews to Jerusalem. Instead he made Circumstance (1922) for Austral Super Films, a company he had established with Cecil Hargraves. They launched a second film almost immediately.

In August 1922, Lawson was sued by Arthur Shirley who claimed Harris used threatening language against him. The case was dismissed.

In January 1923, he announced his next film would be Yellow. It was not made. Instead Lawson returned to the U.S.

In 1924, he married actress Yvonne Pavis. They divorced in 1925, and in the same year, he married actress Dolores Johnson (1903–1957), with whom he had a son, Derek Delevan Harris, who became an actor and director under the name John Derek.

In 1931, he and Johnson divorced and he abandoned his son, but eventually reentered his life.

== Death ==
Harris died on March 31, 1948, in Los Angeles, Los Angeles County, California at the age of 50. He was buried at Los Angeles National Cemetery.

== Filmography ==
- The Throwback (1920) (abandoned) - production manager
- Circumstance (1922) - director, actor, producer, and writer
- A Daughter of Australia (1922) - director, actor, and producer
- Sunshine Sally (1922) - director
- Law or Loyalty (1926) - director and actor
- My Neighbour's Wife (1924)
