= Roy Darling =

Australian film director

Roy Darling (1898, Budapest, Hungary –1956, Australia) was an English-Australian film director and producer who worked in the silent era. Before moving to Australia, he made several films in South Africa, and directed a documentary in India called Beasts in the Jungle (1918). He moved to Australia in 1922 and lost several hundred pounds of his own money investing in his own film, The Lust for Gold (1922). He made a second feature Daughter of the East (1924) then mainly worked on documentaries and commercials. In 1947 he directed a few scenes for a proposed feature The Intimate Stranger which was never completed.

Roy Darling was a composer of country Australian music. The Overlander Trail was his most successful song which he wrote the music and lyrics for. It was first performed by Buddy Williams in 1946, who also starred in Darling's short film He Chased a Chicken (1946) in which Williams performed The Chicken Song.

== Credits ==
Film

- The Lust for Gold (1922)
- Daughter of the East (1924)
- The Hand that Rocks the Cradle (1942) – short
- He Chased a Chicken (1946) – short
- The Intimate Stranger (1947) – abandoned feature

Music

- Dear little lady o' mine (c. 1944)
- Smoky Eyes (c. 1944)
- The Overlander Trail (c. 1945)
- The Chicken Song (c. 1946)
- Smiley (c. 1947)
- Eureka: the stockade song (c. 1948)
- Sandy Hollow Trail (c. 1949)
- Lightning Ridge (c. 1949)
