= Penfolds =

Winery in South Australia

- Magill Estate buildings

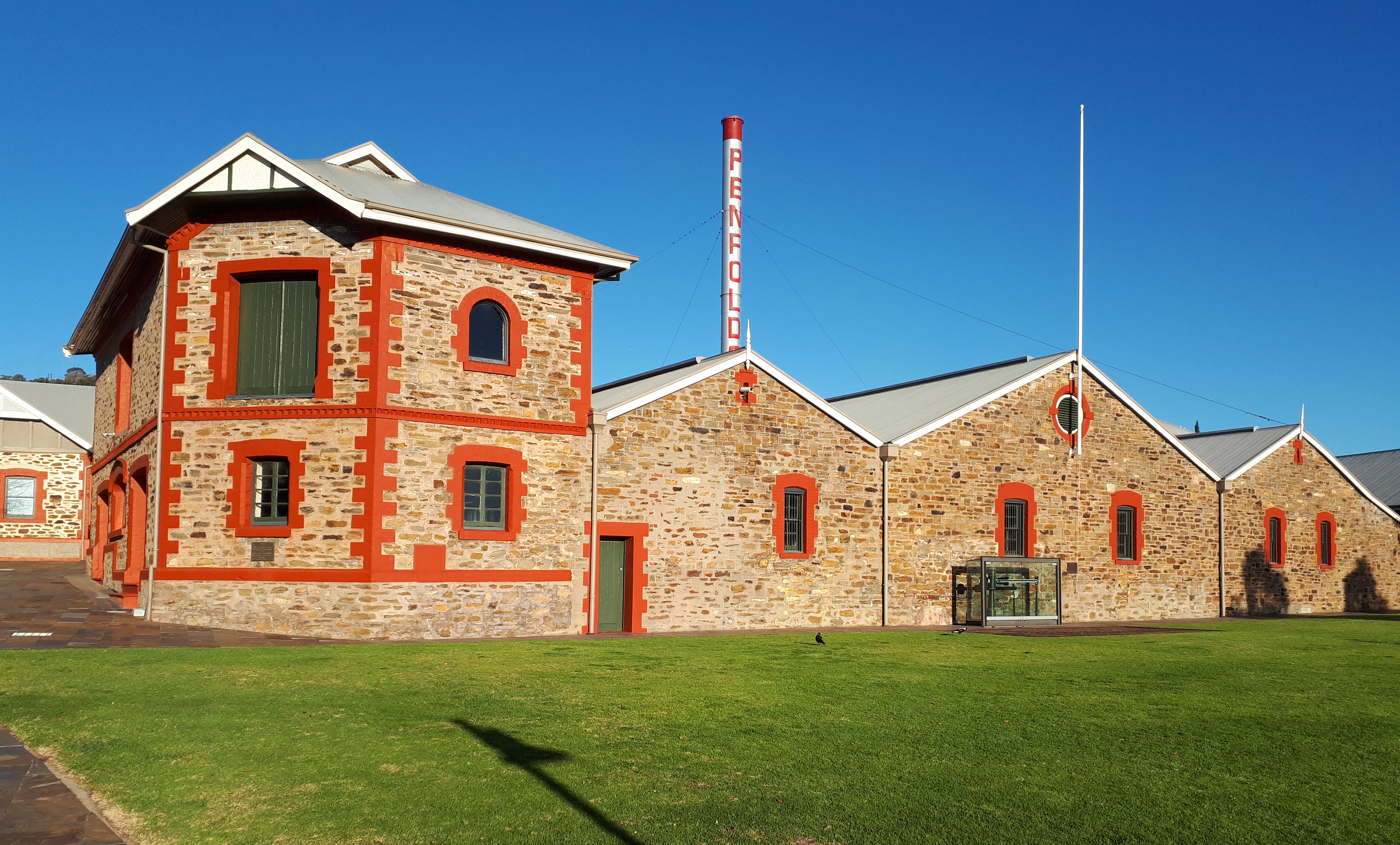
- Location: Magill and Barossa Valley, South Australia, Australia
- Founded: 1844
- Key people: Christopher Rawson Penfold Mary Penfold; Max Schubert Ray Beckwith
- Parent company: Treasury Wine Estates (Since May 2011)
- Known for: Penfolds Grange
- Varietals: Shiraz, Cabernet Sauvignon, Chardonnay, Riesling
- Website: www.penfolds.com

Penfolds is an Australian wine producer that was founded in Adelaide in 1844 by Christopher Rawson Penfold, an English physician who emigrated to Australia, and his wife Mary Penfold. It is one of Australia's oldest wineries, and is currently part of Treasury Wine Estates. Its most famous wine is Penfolds Grange.

The chief winemaker since 2002 has been Peter Gago.

== History ==
=== Arrival of Penfolds in Australia ===
Christopher and Mary Penfold arrived in Australia from Angmering, West Sussex, UK, at the respective ages of 33 and 24, in June 1844.

Following their arrival, they were supported by family members in the attainment of the 500 acres (200 ha) Magill (originally "Mackgill") Estate at the foot of the Mount Lofty Ranges. As part of the cultivation of the land surrounding the cottage that the couple built (named "The Grange"), French grape vine cuttings that had been brought from England were planted.

Christopher was a believer in the medicinal benefits of wine, and both he and Mary planned to concoct a wine tonic for the treatment of anaemia; Christopher had set up his practice on the eastern outskirts of Adelaide, South Australia.

=== Establishment of winery ===
Initially, the Penfolds produced fortified wines in the style of sherry and port for Christopher's patients. As demand for the wines increased, the winery was expanded and was officially established in 1844. In addition to sherry and port, the Penfolds discovered that clarets and rieslings were both easy to produce and popular. As the demand for Christopher's medical services increased, Mary was required to devote more time to the operation of the winery, and her tasks included the cultivation of the vines and grape blending. Mary assumed the running of the winery after her husband died in 1870 at the age of 59. According to one historical account, by the time of Christopher's death the business had "grown to over 60 acres with several different grape varieties including grenache, verdelho, mataro (mourvedre), frontignac and pedro ximenez", and the estate was "producing both sweet and dry red and white table wines with a growing market in the eastern Australian colonies of Victoria and New South Wales." At this time, the Penfolds' son-in-law, Thomas Francis Hyland, was unaware of Mary's fundamental role at the winery, and he urged his mother-in-law to sell the business as preparation for her retirement. Mary did not accept Hyland's advice, and eventually brokered a partnership agreement that resulted in Hyland remaining in Melbourne, while Mary continued her work at the winery in Adelaide.

=== Death of Christopher Penfold ===
A journalist reported in 1874, four years after the death of Christopher Penfold, that Mary blended "the wines when they are two or three years old", a process that "is done under Mrs Penfold's personal supervision, not in conformity with any fixed and definite rule, but entirely according to her judgement and taste". The reporter stated that there was "about 20,000 gallons of wine of that age ready for the market", with a "total stock ... close upon 90,000 gallons". During her tenure, Mary engaged in experimentation, explored new methods of wine production, looked into ways of combating diseases like phylloxera, and engaged a cellar master by the name of Joseph Gillard.

=== Retirement of Mary Penfold ===
Mary retired in 1884, aged 68; at that time the winery owned about a third of all of South Australia's wine stores, and had presented at a colonial exhibition in London.

Following Mary's retirement, her daughter Georgina, and son-in-law Thomas Hyland, assumed responsibility for the day-to-day running of the winery. Subsequently, the business was passed on to their two sons and two daughters. Mary died in 1896,

=== Gladys Penfold Hyland ===
Gladys Penfold Hyland became the chair of the board in 1948 after her husband died. Under her leadership the company's reputation for creating fine wines increased as she backed Max Schubert as he developed the Grange wine. She led the board until 1962 when the company went public. Gladys was a director until 1963. The Penfold family retained a controlling interest until 1976.

=== Early 20th Century ===
In 1903, Penfolds was the largest winery in the Adelaide region, with a production total of 450,000 litres (120,000 US gal) of wine. Between 1904 and 1912, more vineyards in McLaren Vale and New South Wales were purchased.

During the 1940s and 1950s, the company changed its focus and commenced the production of table wines to accommodate changing tastes. This new direction led to experiments by Penfolds' chief winemaker, Max Schubert, who backed by the chair of the board visited Europe following the end of World War II to learn about sherry production; however, it was the time spent by Schubert in Bordeaux that eventually led to the production of Penfolds' and Australia's most famous wine, "Grange Hermitage", later renamed "Grange". In the 1960s the company introduced a series of red wines: Bin 389, Bin 707, Bin 28 and Bin 128, that became the highlights of the Penfolds brand.

=== Tooth and Co. ===
In 1976, control of Penfolds was acquired by Tooth and Co., a brewer based in New South Wales, which in 1982 became part of the Adelaide Steamship Company Group. In 1990, SA Brewing purchased Adelaide Steamship's wineries. Subsequently, SA Brewing was divided into three separate entities: the brewing assets retained the S.A. Brewing name, the wine assets were named Southcorp Wines, and the 'white goods' and other manufacturing interests became Southcorp, an Australian conglomerate. It was also in 1976 that Schubert stood down from the position of Penfolds Chief Winemaker, a role that was passed onto Don Ditter.

In 1977, Penfolds began what was to be an almost twenty-year association with Sydney-based rugby league team, the St George Dragons as the club's primary sponsor. This association saw the Dragons play five 'home' games at the Adelaide Oval between 1991 and 1995, with the 1991 game attracting 28,884 fans. The Dragons, with Penfolds as their sponsor, would win the Sydney premiership in 1977 and 1979, while appearing in the 1985, 1992 and 1993 Grand Finals. Penfolds ended their association with St George at the end of 1995.

Southcorp Wines became a part of the Foster's Group in 2005. In 2011, Fosters Group shareholders voted to demerge the wine operations from the brewing operations, and form two separate companies; Foster's wine business became Treasury Wine Estates (TWE). Headquartered in Melbourne, it was listed on the Australian Securities Exchange (ASX) and began operating as a standalone company on 9 May 2011.

Since then, Penfolds operates two wineries: Magill Estate, at the base of Adelaide's eastern foothills, and Nuriootpa in the Barossa Valley.

In June 2012 Penfolds released a limited edition run of the "2004 Block 42" wine that was only sold in glass ampoules. The wine was labelled by the Huffington Post publication as "the most expensive wine directly sold from a winery in the world", as the winery sought US$168,000 for each of the ampoules. The glass ampoules were designed and hand-blown by Australian glass artist Nick Mount.

== Vineyards ==
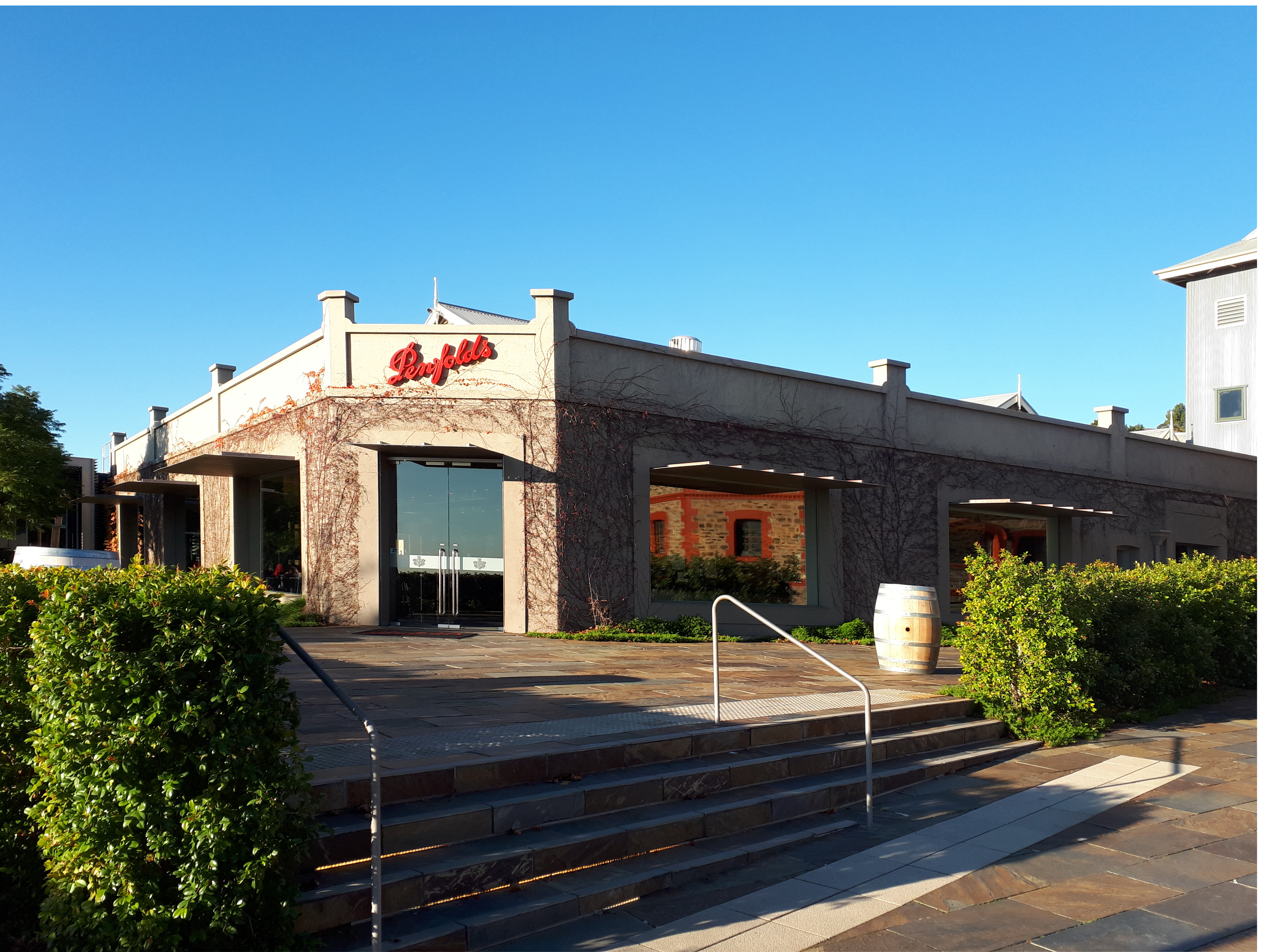
Magill Estate Kitchen, Magill

Penfolds operates a number of vineyards in the South Australian wine regions that produce a wide range of grape varieties:

- Adelaide
  - Magill Estate (5.34 hectares (13.2 acres)) – shiraz
- Barossa Valley
  - Kalimna (290 hectares (720 acres)-property, 153 hectares (380 acres) under vine) – shiraz, cabernet sauvignon, mataro (mourvèdre), eight rows of sangiovese
  - Koonunga Hill (93 hectares (230 acres)) – shiraz, cabernet sauvignon
  - Waltons (317 hectares (780 acres), 130 hectares (320 acres) planted) – shiraz, cabernet sauvignon, mataro (mourvèdre)
  - Stonewell (33 hectares (82 acres)) – shiraz, cabernet sauvignon
- Eden Valley
  - Woodbury (69.56 hectares (171.9 acres))
- McLaren Vale (141 hectares (350 acres) across four vineyards) – shiraz, grenache and cabernet sauvignon
- Coonawarra (close to 50 hectares (120 acres)) – mainly cabernet sauvignon and shiraz

== Trademark registration ==
First used in 1923, the Penfolds logo is one of Australia's most recognised trademarks. Eight Penfolds wines were named by the Langtons auction house in its 2012 list of the top 20 most-desired brands.

== Awards ==
In 2013 Penfolds was awarded "New World Winery of the Year" by American wine industry publication, Wine Enthusiast Magazine.

In 2016, Penfolds was named the Most Admired Wine Brand by Drinks International.

Penfolds Grange was classified as a First Growth in Liv-ev's 2017 recreation of the Bordeaux 1855 classification.

The only Australian winery to receive a perfect score from both Wine Spectator and Wine Advocate for the same vintage (Grange 2008).

Grange 1955 was named one of the Top 12 Wines of the 20th Century by Wine Spectator.

== Causes ==
In 2012, Penfolds listed as a partner of the (RED) campaign, together with Nike, Girl, American Express and Converse. The campaign's mission is to prevent the transmission of the HIV virus from mother to child by 2015. The campaign's byline is "Fighting For An AIDS Free Generation".

== Penfold family ==
=== Christopher Rawson Penfold ===
- His father John Penfold was vicar at Steyning, UK from 1792 until his death in 1840.
- Born 2 August 1811 in Steyning, UK.
- One of his sisters, Frances Esther Penfold, married Courtney Clarke of Larch Hill, County Dublin, in Ireland.
- Arrived in Australia on 18 June 1844 on the Taglioni, after having paid a deposit for 500 acres (200 ha) of land in Magill to the Colonial Land and Emigration Commission before departure.
- Became the first chairman of the District Council of Burnside in 1856.
- Died 1870.
- Penfold Park, situated near the top of The Parade, is named after him.
- Wattle Park Kindergarten, at Wattle Park, was formerly named Christopher Rawson Penfold Kindergarten.

=== Mary Penfold ===
- Wife of Christopher Penfold.
- Became fundamental in the development of the winery after the demands upon Christopher's medical practice increased.
- Assumed responsibility of the winery following Christopher's death.

=== Thomas Francis Hyland ===
- Son-in-law who married the Penfolds' daughter Georgina.
- Continued to run the wine business with Georgina after Mary's retirement.

=== Inez Penfold Hyland ===
- Granddaughter who was sent to live with her grandmother Mary Penfold. A gifted poet, her life was cut short by Enteric Fever when she was only 28 years old. Her grandmother, Mary, whom Inez had lived for 20 years with at Magill was devastated at her loss.

=== Street names in Rosslyn Park ===
- Grange Avenue: named after the Penfolds' family cottage
- Hyland Terrace: named after Thomas Hyland
- Inez Court: named after Inez Penfold Hyland
- Mary Penfold Drive: named after Mary Penfold
- Penfold Road: named after Mary and Christopher Penfold
- Rawson Penfold Drive: named after Christopher Rawson Penfold

== See also ==
- Australian wine
- Cult wine
- Penfolds Grange
- South Australian wine
- List of wineries in the Barossa Valley
