= Penfolds Grange =

Australian wine

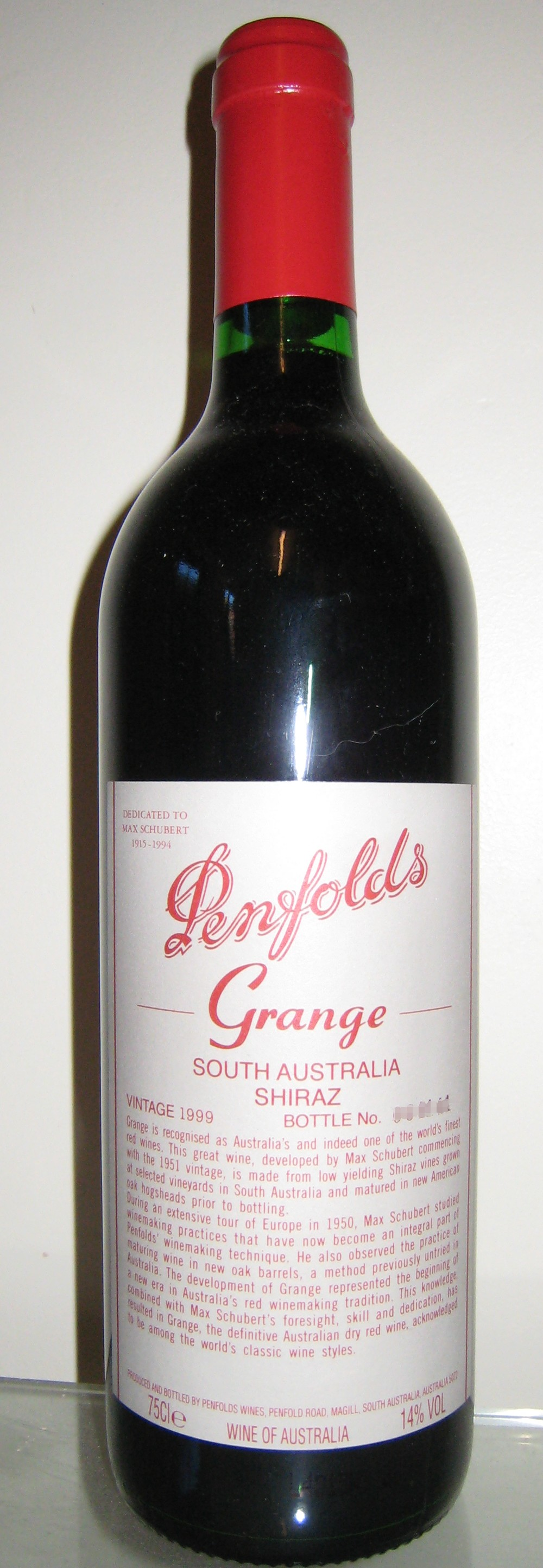
Penfolds Grange 1999

Penfolds Grange (until the 1989 vintage labelled Penfolds Grange Hermitage) is an Australian wine, made predominantly from the Shiraz (Syrah) grape and usually a small percentage of Cabernet Sauvignon. It is widely considered one of Australia's "first growth" and its most collectable wine. The term "Hermitage", the name of a French wine appellation, was commonly used in Australia as another synonym for Shiraz or Syrah. Penfolds is owned by Treasury Wine Estates.

== 1950s–1960s ==
The first vintage of Penfolds Grange was made on an experimental basis in 1951 by Penfolds winemaker Max Schubert and were largely given away at the time. Having toured Europe in 1950, Schubert implemented wine-making techniques observed in Bordeaux upon his return, aiming to create a red wine able to rival the finest Bordeaux wines both in terms of quality and ageing potential.

Individual bottles of the 1951 vintage are still held by collectors; one sold at auction in 2004 for just over $50,000 AUD. The first vintage to be commercially released was the 1952. Penfolds Grange was styled as a powerful still wine in an age when fortified wines were in fashion. Negative reviews by wine critics and poor commercial prospects for the wine led Penfolds management in 1957 to forbid Schubert from producing Penfolds Grange, but Schubert persisted in secret through 1959.

== 1970s–1980s ==
The 1971 vintage received the top score against other renowned international wines of the 1970s in a blind tasting with an international panel of judges in 2015. Originally released for around AUD $10 in 1976 the 1971 sells at auction between AUD $700 and AUD $1,100.

Schubert retired in 1975, passing the custodianship of Grange to Don Ditter. Ditter had been working at Penfolds since 1950 after graduating from Roseworthy Agricultural College.

Ditter retired as Penfolds' Chief Winemaker in 1986. During his time as Chief Winemaker several highly regarded Grange vintages were released, including 1976 and 1986. 1976 was awarded 100 points by American critic Robert Parker Jr. 1986, Ditter's last vintage, has been labelled as the 'defining vintage of the 1980s' as well as an 'important and very successful vintage'.

== 1990s ==
The 1990 vintage of Grange attracted a great amount of interest after Wine Spectator Magazine named it their 'Wine of the Year' in 1995. The name "Hermitage" was dropped from the label with the 1990 vintage, following objections by the European Union authorities to the use of a French place-name; no third-country wine entering EU may carry a geographical name recognised by European wine officials.

In 1991 and in 2000, Duval was named Red Winemaker of the Year at the International Wine Challenge in London.

Duval also oversaw the 'White Grange' project at Penfolds. This project was intended to produce a white wine that would equal the quality and reputation of Grange. The resultant wine, Penfolds Yattarna, was first released with the 1995 vintage.

== 2000s ==
In 2002, Peter Gago assumed custodianship of Penfolds Grange as the replacement Chief Winemaker for the outgoing John Duval. The 2008 vintage of Grange was awarded 'perfect' 100-point ratings from two influential American wine reviewers, "Wine Spectator". and "Wine Advocate". With these accolades this vintage became the first 'New World' wine to receive 100 points from both reviewers.

== Collectability ==
By the end of the 1980s the wine came to be regarded as a collector's item. The first vintage, 1951, is now considered highly collectable with one sold at auction in 2004 for just over $50,000 AUD. As of 2015 the highest price a collections of Grange has been sold at auction in Australia was AUD $176,000.

Listed in the 4th edition of Langton’s Classification of Australian Wine at the "Exceptional" level, Grange has been in the top Langton classification since 1991.

Penfolds Grange is the only wine to be heritage listed by the South Australian National Trust.

== Production style ==
Unlike most expensive cult wines from the Old World which are from single vineyards or even small plots (called blocks) within vineyards, Grange is made from grapes harvested over a wide area. This means that the precise composition of the wine changes from year to year; it is the expertise of the winemakers which purchasers value, rather than the qualities of the specific places where the grapes are grown, or the particular vines. The quantity of Penfolds Grange produced varies from year to year, with 1,800 bottles of the original 1951 vintage produced. Gago states that 7,000 to 9,000 cases are made each vintage as of 2013.

== Ownership ==
In the 1980s, Tooth & Co. (who were then part of the Adelaide Steamship Group) purchased a number of wineries, including Penfolds. AdSteam sold its wineries to SA Brewing Holdings in 1990, who then amalgamated all of its wine holdings into "The Penfolds Wines Group". In 1994 SA Brewing Holdings split into three companies: brewing into SA Brewing Company, wine in Southcorp Wines, and other activities into Southcorp. Upon its acquisition of Southcorp Wines in May 2005, ownership of the Penfolds brand, along with its museum collection of Penfolds Grange, passed to the Foster's Group.

In May 2011 Penfolds, along with the rest of Foster's wine brands, were spun off into Treasury Wine Estates, a separate company listed on the Australian Securities Exchange.

== See also ==
- Australian wine
- Cult wine
- Penfolds
- South Australian wine
- List of wineries in the Barossa Valley
