= John Saul (actor) =

Australian actor and director

John Saul (1913–1979) was an Australian actor and director, recognized as one of the leading figures in Australian radio during the 1940s and 1950s. He was married to actress Georgie Sterling and was an early mentor of Rod Taylor. For many years, he played Dave Rudd on radio in Dad and Dave from Snake Gully.
