= Max Schubert =

Australian wine maker

Max Edmund Schubert AM
- Max Schubert AM
- Born: 9 February 1915; Moculta, South Australia
- Died: 6 March 1994 (aged 79); Adelaide, South Australia
- Occupation: Winemaker
- Years active: 1931–1982
- Known for: Creator of Penfolds Grange Hermitage

Max Schubert AM (9 February 1915 – 6 March 1994) was a pioneering Australian winemaker, with Penfolds, who is best known as the creator of Grange Hermitage. Schubert was included in the Sydney Morning Herald's 100 most influential Australians of the century, which was published in 2001.

== Life and career ==
Schubert was born to Lutheran parents in a German community on the fringes of the Barossa Valley, South Australia, a region renowned for its winemaking. He joined Penfolds in 1931 as a messenger boy and became Penfolds' first chief winemaker in 1948 at the age of 33, a position he held until 1975. Schubert spent his entire working life with Penfolds. He was described as "a true company man, devoted to Penfolds, (...) a humble and loyal servant of the Penfold family, and later of the public company."

Schubert served in the Second World War, volunteering against the wishes of his managing director at Penfolds. He is believed to have saved the life of another Australia soldier when Stuka dive-bombers wiped out his convoy in north Africa, killing 200 men. He went on to serve in Greece, Crete, the Middle East, Ceylon and New Guinea, where he contracted malaria.

== Grange Hermitage ==
In 1949 Schubert was sent to France and Spain to learn more about fortified wine making, fortified wines being the main production focus of Australian wineries during the period. As part of the trip he also visited the Bordeaux region, including first growth estates Château Lafite Rothschild, Château Latour and Château Margaux. On visiting these estates he was afforded the opportunity to taste aged Bordeaux wines.

On returning to Australia, Schubert set about creating a wine for Penfolds that would similarly match the ability to age that he had seen in France. In 1951 the first experimental wine of the project was produced. Schubert named this wine "Grange Hermitage", a combination of the name of the Penfold family cottage "Grange" and the French appellation "Hermitage". Unlike the Bordeaux wines, Grange was comprised not of Cabernet, but almost exclusively of Shiraz. With the French appellation Hermitage being a Shiraz/Syrah growing area the wine was thus named.

Schubert stated, "The method of production seemed fairly straightforward, but with several unorthodox features, and I felt that it would only be a matter of undertaking a complete survey of vineyards to find the correct varietal grape material. Then with a modified approach to take account of differing conditions, such as climate, soil, raw material and techniques generally, would not be impossible to produce a wine which could stand on its own feet throughout the world and would be capable of improvement year by year for a minimum of 20 years."

1952 saw the first commercial release of Grange. Initially it did not receive a favourable reception. By 1957 Schubert was ordered by Penfolds management to cease production. However the 1957, 1958 and 1959 vintages of Grange were still made by Schubert despite this direction.

A reprieve was granted for the production of Grange after a latter tasting by the Penfolds board of the early Grange wines met with much more favourable opinions. The 1960 vintage enabled Schubert to return to using new oak barrels, something he had been unable to do during the 1957–59 vintages.

The 1955 vintage of Grange Hermitage was submitted to wine competitions beginning in 1962 and over the years has won more than 50 gold medals. The 1971 vintage won first prize in Syrah/Shiraz at the Wine Olympics in Paris. The 1990 vintage was named "Red Wine of the Year" by Wine Spectator magazine in 1995, which later rated the 1998 vintage a 99 points out of a possible 100.

A Schubert created 1951 Grange became the most expensive Australian Wine to ever be sold, when it was bought for $142,131 AUD at auction in July 2021.

Schubert died in 1994, aged 79, at his home in Adelaide, South Australia. In his obituary The New York Times noted that his Grange had won more wine show prizes than any other Australian red wine, and was regarded as the flagship of Australia's wine industry.

== Bin 60A and other wines ==
In 1962 Schubert created a wine from that would become known as Bin 60A. Created using Cabernet Sauvignon from the Coonawarra (Sharam's Block and Block 20) and Barossa Valley shiraz (Kalimna Vineyard), the Bin 60A became Penfolds' most successful show wine, winning thirty-three gold medals and nineteen trophies in a short timespan.

The experimental wine was produced in relatively small quantities, with a little over 400 cases of the wine produced. Acclaimed on the show circuit on release, the Bin 60A received even greater acknowledgement after Max Schubert's death, when in 2004 Decanter Magazine named it as the only New World wine in its top 10 of the greatest wines of all time.

In 2008 respected Australian wine critic James Halliday said of the Bin 60A, "An utterly superb wine, a glorious freak of nature and man... The palate is virtually endless, with a peacock’s tail stolen from the greatest of Burgundies... This is possibly the greatest red wine tasted in our times in Australia."

In 1953 Schubert created a solely Cabernet-based Grange, released with the moniker Bin 9. This wine was created using grapes from the Kalimna Block 42. Block 42 is stated as being the site of the oldest continuously producing Cabernet Sauvignon vines on earth. In 1961 a Bin 58 Cabernet Sauvignon was produced using Block 42 fruit, and again in 1963 as Bin 63 - a wine that won the prestigious Jimmy Watson Memorial Trophy in 1964. In 1964 Schubert created the first Bin 707 wine from Block 42 fruit.

Schubert is also credited with the creation of Penfolds Bin series wine, beginning with Bin 28 in 1959, and followed by Bin 389 a year later in 1960.

== Other work ==
His other innovations included the use of plastics, refrigeration, pH control, and cold stabilisation of white wines.

== Honours ==
Over the course of his career, and beyond, Schubert received many awards, including Member of the Order of Australia (AM) and the inaugural Maurice O'Shea Award for his contribution to the Australian wine industry. He was also named 1988 Man of the Year by the UK's Decanter Magazine.

In 1997 Max was posthumously honoured with the creation of the Electoral district of Schubert in the South Australian House of Assembly, a seat in the lower house of the South Australian state parliament. The electoral district includes the Barossa Valley wine region where Max Schubert was born and began working at Penfolds.

== See also ==
- Australian wine
- List of wine personalities
