= Kevin Cullen (doctor) =

Australian medical doctor, researcher, and winemaker (1922–1994)

Kevin John Cullen, AM (22 November 1922 – 9 February 1994) was an Australian medical doctor, researcher, and winemaker, active in Western Australia's South West. He is best known for his role in founding the Busselton Health Study and Cullen Wines.

== Biography ==
Cullen was born on 22 November 1922 in the Western Australian town of Bunbury as the younger son of Alfred, an English-born surgeon, and his locally born wife Elvie (née Clarke). He was schooled locally for two years before boarding in Perth at Hale School from 1929 to 1939. He then attended the University of Western Australia for a year, studying science, before moving to the University of Melbourne Faculty of Medicine, where he graduated with a Bachelor of Science and a Bachelor of Medicine in 1946. This was the standard course progression for medical students in Western Australia before the establishment of the University of Western Australia School of Medicine. Also in 1946, he married Diana Cullen (née Adams), a physiotherapist, in Hobart while Cullen was a resident medical officer at Royal Hobart Hospital; the couple had three sons and three daughters.

In 1948, Cullen moved to the Western Australian town of Busselton, where he set up a general practice the next year. He subsequently studied at the University of Edinburgh Medical School and became a member of the Royal College of Physicians of Edinburgh in 1958. He returned to Western Australia and, while continuing his full-time practice, in 1962 became the first person to receive an M.D. degree from the recently established University of Western Australia School of Medicine for his thesis A Survey of Behaviour Disorders and Related Factors in the Children of 1000 Western Australian Families. In 1963 he moved with his family to the US, where he continued work on longitudinal studies of child development on a research fellowship at the University of California, Berkeley.

He then returned to Busselton, where he established an institute of medical and population studies. In 1966 he and a team of Perth-based practitioners and researchers founded the Busselton Health Study, a long-term survey of the health of Busselton's population, whose data has been used in over 400 research publications.

In 1966, the Cullens with friends and colleagues established a trial acre of vines, inspired by the work of John Gladstones, who had written papers about the potential of the area as a wine region. In 1971, Kevin and Diana founded Cullen Wines, originally known as Wilyabrup Wines, in a property they had bought in 1948 in Wilyabrup in what became the Margaret River wine region. While Diana became more involved with managing the vineyard, Kevin continued his general practice and research work. He helped make the winery's first cabernet sauvignon in 1974 and regularly travelled to Bordeaux to buy more examples of the variety. In 1986 he founded the Cullen Wines International Chardonnay Tasting, to assist in comparison between the varieties in Margaret River and other regions.

He died in Busselton on 9 February 1994, aged 71, after an eighteen-month bout of motor neurone disease.

== Recognition ==
Cullen became a fellow of the College of Physicians of Edinburgh in 1972 and a fellow of the Royal Australasian College of Physicians in 1982. In 1993, he received the Australian Medical Association's inaugural award for individual achievement, was named the Western Australian Citizen of the Year in the "professionals" division, and had the Busselton community health centre named in his honour by Premier of Western Australia Richard Court. In the 1994 Australia Day Honours, he was named a Member of the Order of Australia "In recognition of service to medicine, particularly in the Busselton region and to the wine industry". In 2006 Cullen Wines renamed its Cullen Chardonnay the Kevin John Chardonnay, and has since released the Kevin John Legacy Series.
