= Fermoy Estate =

Western Australian winery

Fermoy
- Location: 838 Metricup Road, Wilyabrup, Western Australia 6280, Australia
- Coordinates: 33°47′05″S 115°02′44″E
- Wine region: Margaret River
- Founded: 1985
- First vines planted: 1985
- Key people: Aaron and John Young, owners; Jeremy Hodgson, winemaker
- Known for: Cabernet Sauvignon & Chardonnay
- Varietals: Chardonnay, Cabernet Sauvignon, Merlot, Shiraz, Sauvignon Blanc, Semillon
- Distribution: International
- Tasting: Open to public
- Website: Fermoy Estate

Fermoy Estate is an Australian winery at Wilyabrup, in the Margaret River wine region of Western Australia.

== History ==
Established by John and Beryl Anderson in 1985, it was named in honour of one of John Anderson's ancestors, a Scottish-born businessman who acquired part of Fermoy estate, just north of Cork, Ireland, and set up several industries there.

In 1999, the winery was purchased by Dutch/Swiss businessman Hans Hulsbergen. Under his ownership, most of the winery's output was exported to Europe, where his wine business interests were centred. In December 2010, Hulsbergen sold the winery to Perth brothers Aaron and John Young.

Fermoy Estate has had a long association with Australian chef and restaurateur Luke Mangan. In May 2004, its Cabernet Sauvignon 2001 was served at a state dinner hosted by Mangan at the Australian Embassy, Copenhagen, for Frederik, Crown Prince of Denmark, and his then fiancée, Mary Donaldson, in the lead-up to their royal wedding.

China Southern Airlines added wines from Fermoy to their economy class menu in 2016. The contract began in April 2016 with an initial end date of 2018, and encompassed the New Zealand, Australia, and China flight corridor.

== Accolades ==
In 2001, the Perth Royal Wine Show named Fermoy's 2000 vintage Best Merlot.

The International Wine Challenge has awarded several of Fermoy's wines over the years. In 2008, the 2007 Nebbiolo won silver. The 2008 Reserve Semillon won gold at the 2010 competition, with the 2008 Cabernet Sauvignon winning bronze. In 2014, the 2011 Reserve Cabernet Sauvignon won bronze, with the 2012 Reserve Chardonnay receiving a commendation award.

The 2013 Reserve Cabernet Sauvignon won the April 2015 International Competition of Cabernets, the first Australian wine to win.

Decanter awarded the 2019 Reserve Chardonnay "Best in Show" at the Decanter World Wine Awards in 2021. It also won Best Chadonnay, White Wine of Show and Wine of Show at the 2021 West Australia Wine Show. In 2024, Fermoy's 2020 Reserve Cabernet Sauvignon won Best in Show from Decanter.

== See also ==
- Australian wine
- List of wineries in Western Australia
- Western Australian wine
