= Lenton Brae Estate =

Western Australian winery

Lenton Brae
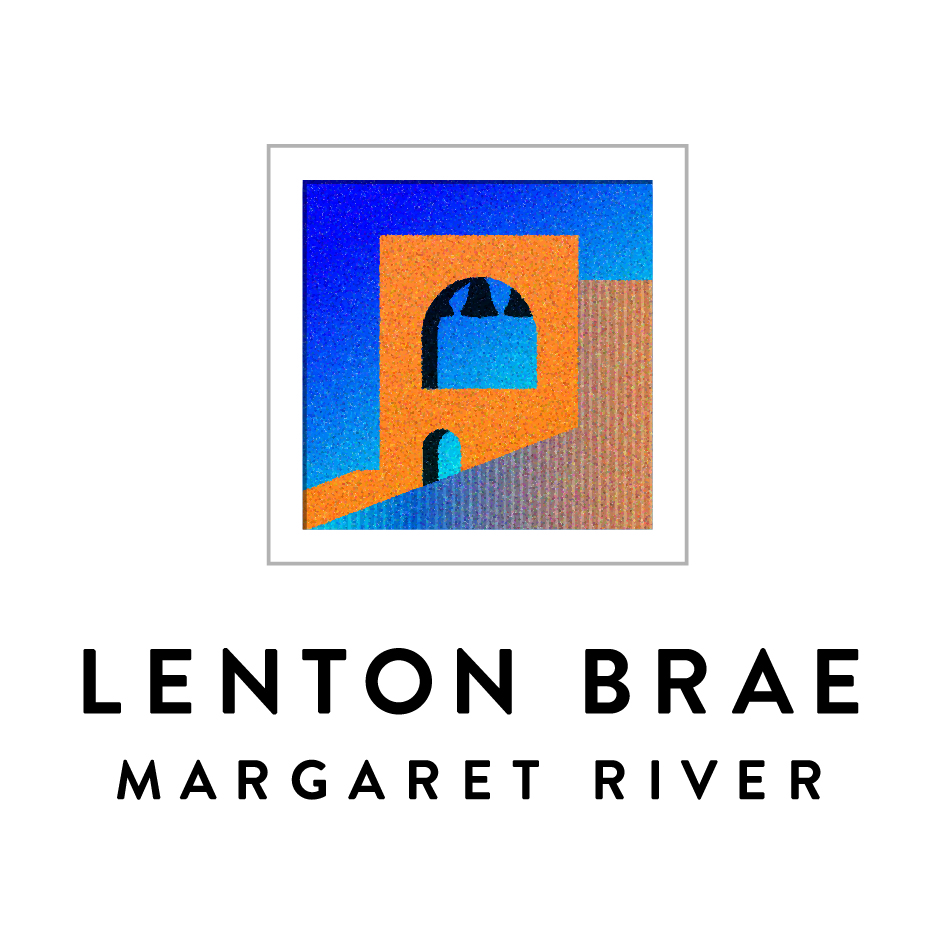
- Location: 3887 Caves Road, Wilyabrup, Western Australia 6280, Australia
- Coordinates: 33°46′54″S 115°02′10″E
- Wine region: Margaret River
- Founded: 1982
- First vines planted: Cabernet Sauvignon, Semillon, Chardonnay
- First vintage: 1987
- Key people: Sarah Davis and Andrew Jackson, Owners; Vanessa Carson, Winemaker
- Known for: Cabernet Sauvignon, Chardonnay and Semillon Sauvignon Blanc
- Varietals: Chardonnay, Cabernet Sauvignon, Merlot, Petit Verdot, Sauvignon Blanc, Semillon, Pinot Blanc
- Other products: Tastings, Tours, Local Deli Selection
- Distribution: International
- Tasting: Open to Public
- Website: www.lentonbrae.com

Lenton Brae is an Australian winery at Wilyabrup, in the Margaret River wine region of Western Australia.

Established in 1982, the winery first came to prominence in 1990, when it won two trophies, including the wine-of-the-show prize, at the SGIO WA Winemakers exhibition. In 2009, leading Australian wine writer James Halliday rated Lenton Brae as one of the best wineries in the Margaret River region.

== See also ==
- Australian wine
- List of wineries in Western Australia
- Western Australian wine
