= Gralyn Estate =

Winery in Margaret River region of Western Australia

- Location: 4145 Caves Road, Wilyabrup WA 6280, Australia
- Coordinates: 33°48′13″S 115°01′53″E
- Wine region: Margaret River
- Founded: 1975
- First vines planted: 1975
- First vintage: 1978
- Key people: Merilyn and Graham Hutton, founders; Annette (daughter) and Scott Baxter, owners and winemakers
- Cases/yr: 3000
- Varietals: Cabernet Sauvignon, Chardonnay, Muscat, Pedro Ximénez, Riesling, Shiraz
- Tasting: Cellar Door sales open 7 days
- Website: Gralyn Estate

Gralyn Estate is an Australian winery at Wilyabrup, in the Margaret River wine region of Western Australia. Established in 1975 on a beef-farming property, it is well-known for high quality fortified wines, and also make premium dry reds, chardonnay and a selection of sweet wines. Gralyn Estate opened Margaret River's first cellar door in 1978.

== Awards ==
In April 2022 Gralyn Estate won the 'Wine of the Year' award for their Artizan Rare Muscat at the London Wine Competition.

- Australian wine
- List of wineries in Western Australia
- Western Australian wine
