= Pierro =

Western Australian winery

- Location: 4051 Caves Road, Wilyabrup WA 6280, Australia
- Coordinates: 33°47′44″S 115°01′55″E
- Wine region: Margaret River
- Founded: 1979
- First vines planted: 1979
- First vintage: 1983
- Key people: Dr Michael Peterkin, owner and winemaker
- Known for: Chardonnay
- Varietals: Cabernet franc, Cabernet Sauvignon, Chardonnay, Malbec, Merlot, Petit Verdot, Pinot noir, Sauvignon Blanc, Semillon
- Tasting: Open to public
- Website: Pierro

Pierro Margaret River Vineyards (usually referred to simply as Pierro) is an Australian winery at Wilyabrup, in the Margaret River wine region of Western Australia. Established in 1979 on a scrubby, rocky and steeply sloping property, it has been described as having "one of the prettiest locations in an area that offers much, even at its most mundane."

The winery's name, adapted from that of the folk tale character Pierrot, alludes to both the winery's founder, Dr Michael Peterkin, and its location, as both "Pierrot" and "Peterkin" mean "son of Peter" and "son of the rock".

== See also ==
- Australian wine
- List of wineries in Western Australia
- Western Australian wine
