= Ashbrook Estate =

Western Australian winery

- Location: Tom Cullity Drive (formerly Harman Rd South), Wilyabrup WA 6280, Australia
- Coordinates: 33°48′31″S 115°03′42″E
- Wine region: Margaret River
- Founded: 1975
- First vintage: 1979
- Known for: Ashbrook Chardonnay
- Varietals: Chardonnay, Cabernet Franc, Cabernet Sauvignon, Merlot, Petit Verdot, Riesling, Sauvignon blanc, Semillon, Shiraz, Verdelho
- Distribution: International
- Tasting: Open to public
- Website: Ashbrook Estate

Ashbrook Estate is an Australian winery based at Wilyabrup, in the Margaret River wine region of Western Australia. The winery sells much of its output through the cellar door and to mailing list clientele. Its wines, and especially its white wines, have been highly praised by influential Australian wine writers Ray Jordan and James Halliday.

== Wines and Vineyards ==
Ashbrook Estate's vineyard is 17.4 hectares in size. This produces 14,500 cases per year. The vineyard used by Ashbrook Estate is located in the Margaret River region. Using these grapes they create primarily white wines. The white wines include Chardonnay, Semillon, Sauvignon Blanc, Riesling, and Verdelho. A smaller number of red wines are also produced, including Cabernet Sauvignon.

== See also ==
- List of wineries in Western Australia
- Western Australian wine
