= Driftwood Estate =

Winery and restaurant at Wilyabrup, in Western Australia

- Location: 3314 Caves Road, Wilyabrup WA 6280, Australia
- Coordinates: 33°43′58″S 115°02′09″E
- Wine region: Margaret River
- Founded: 1989
- Key people: Helen and Tom Galapoulos, owners; Kane Grove, Tom Houghton, winemakers
- Known for: Single Site Cabernet Sauvignon, Chardonnay
- Varietals: Chardonnay, Cabernet franc, Cabernet Sauvignon, Merlot, Petit Verdot, Sauvignon blanc, Semillon, Shiraz, Verdelho, Viognier
- Other attractions: Restaurant
- Distribution: International
- Tasting: Open to public
- Website: Driftwood Estate

Driftwood Estate is an Australian winery at Wilyabrup, in the Margaret River wine region of Western Australia. The winery was established by Tom and Helen Galapoulos in 1989, on what had been a country retreat. It received acclaim when its first wine, a semillon produced in 1993, won a special commendation in a British competition. In 2009, leading Australian wine writer James Halliday rated Driftwood Estate as one of the best wineries in the Margaret River region.

== See also ==
- List of wineries in Western Australia
- Western Australian wine
