= Brookland Valley Estate =

Winery in Wilyabrup, Western Australia

- Location: Caves Road, Wilyabrup WA 6280, Australia
- Coordinates: 33°47′42″S 115°01′28″E
- Wine region: Margaret River
- Founded: 1984
- Key people: Courtney Treacher, winemaker
- Parent company: Accolade Wines
- Known for: Brookland Valley Reserve Chardonnay
- Varietals: Chardonnay, Cabernet Sauvignon, Merlot, Sauvignon blanc, Semillon, Shiraz
- Other attractions: Flutes Café; Gallery of Wine Arts
- Distribution: International
- Tasting: Open to public
- Website: Brookland Valley Estate

Brookland Valley Estate (often referred to simply as Brookland Valley) is an Australian winery at Wilyabrup, in the Margaret River wine region of Western Australia. Australian wine writer Ray Jordan has described its vineyard as one of Australia's showpieces; another writer, James Halliday, considers its Flutes Café to be one of the best winery restaurants in the region.

== History ==
It was founded in 1984.

In 1999, the company launched a new range of wine with flautist Jane Elizabeth Rutter, featuring the label "Blo (Pan's Song)", one of Rutter's compositions. In 2009, she was suing the wine estate for using an image of her score on other labels as well, for copyright infringement.

In November 2022, the Swinney family, with the wine-growing brand Swinney, purchased Brookland Valley Estate, with the Brookland Valley brand still owned by Accolade Wines. Swinney took ownership of the property in Wilyabrup, including the vineyard, Flutes restaurant, a cellar door and two residences.

In 2023, Brookland Valley estate was bought for $6.5 million by Accolade Wines.

== See also ==
- Australian wine
- List of wineries in Western Australia
- Western Australian wine
