= Hay Shed Hill Wines =

- Location: 511 Harmans Mill Road, Wilyabrup WA 6280, Australia
- Coordinates: 33°47′53″S 115°03′50″E
- Wine region: Margaret River
- Founded: 1973
- Key people: Michael Kerrigan, winemaker
- Varietals: Cabernet Sauvignon, Cabernet franc, Chardonnay, Malbec, Merlot, Petit Verdot, Riesling, Sauvignon blanc, Semillon, Shiraz, Tempranillo
- Other products: Hay Shed Hill Deli Café
- Distribution: International
- Tasting: Open to public
- Website: Hay Shed Hill

Hay Shed Hill Wines (often referred to simply as Hay Shed Hill) is an Australian winery at Wilyabrup, in the Margaret River wine region of Western Australia.

The winery also makes the wines marketed under the brand name Pitchfork, which was introduced in 1997.

== History ==
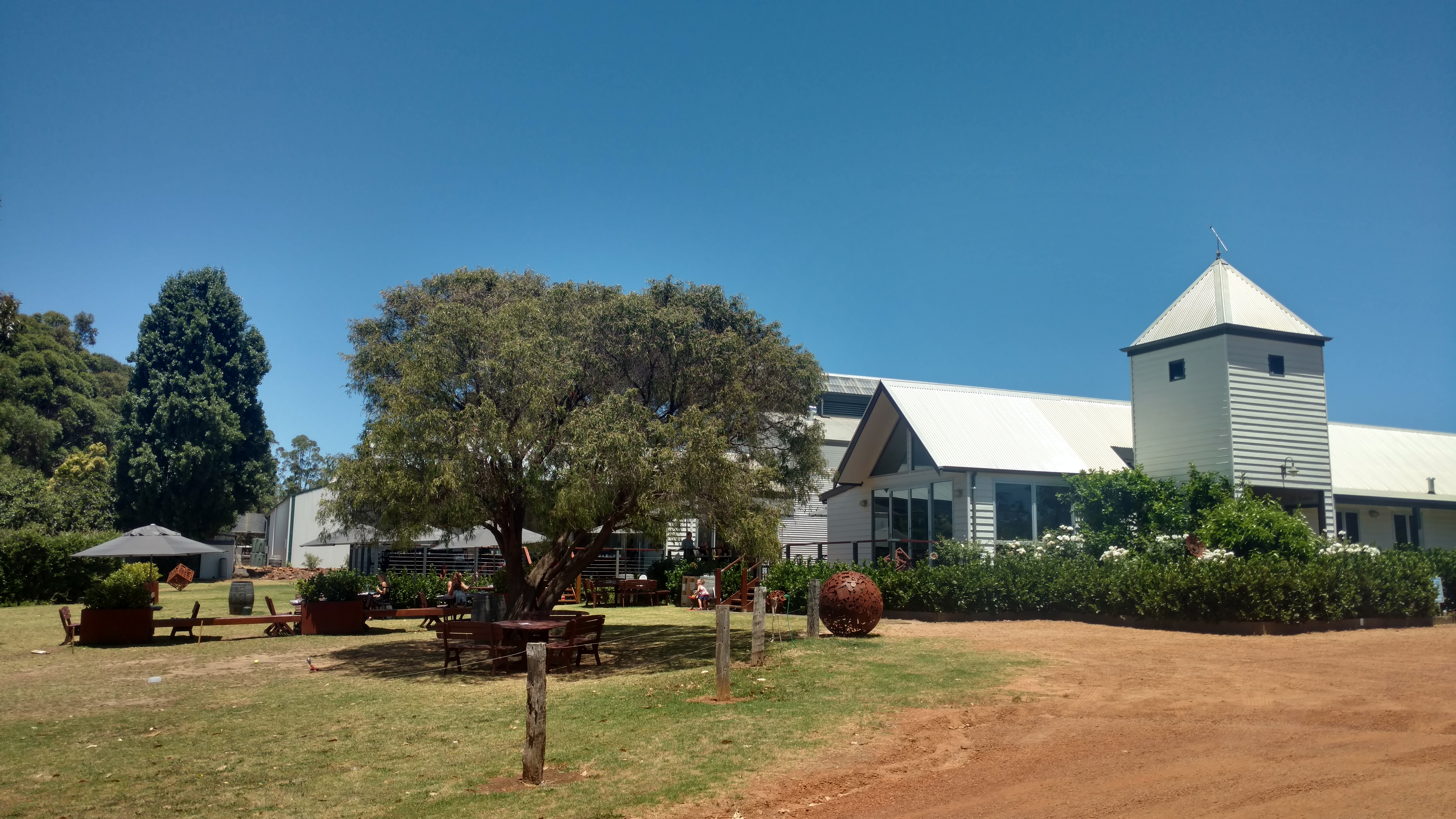
The winery building, 2016

Hay Shed Hill Wines traces its origins back to 1973, when its vineyard was established on a large dairy farm; its earliest wines were made in a hay shed, on a hill overlooking the pastures.

In 1989, the property, then named Sussex Vale, was bought by Liz and Barry Morrison, who renamed it Hay Shed Hill. The Morrisons rejuvenated the vineyard, and in 1992 completed a renovation of the cellar door and winery.

Between 2000 and 2006, Hay Shed Hill had corporate owners, initially Barrington Wine Co, and later Australian Wine Holdings. It was then purchased by a group of friends, including Leith Pavlinovich and winemaker Michael Kerrigan.

== See also ==
- Australian wine
- List of wineries in Western Australia
- Western Australian wine
