= Viña Anakena =

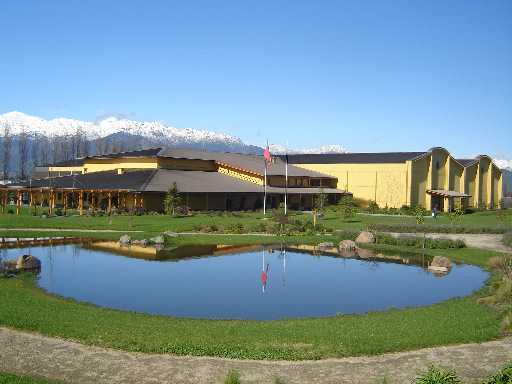
- Location: Alto Cachapoal, Chile
- Appellation: Cachapoal Valley
- Founded: 1999 (26–27 years ago)
- Key people: Founders: Felipe Ibáñez and Jorge Gutiérrez
- Parent company: Accolade Wines
- Cases/yr: 400,000
- Known for: Alwa, Ona, Tama, Varietales, Birdman

Anakena is a privately owned winery based in the Alto Cachapoal area of the Rapel Valley of Chile. It produces a variety of styles. In September 2015 Anakena was bought by Accolade Wines for $30 million.

== History ==
Vina Anakena was founded by Felipe Ibáñez and Jorge Gutiérrez, childhood friends, in 1999. It was established in Alto Cachapoal, in the foothills of the Andes Mountains. Anakena owns over 400 hectares (990 acres) of vineyards (155 hectares (380 acres) in Cachapoal Valley, 128 hectares (320 acres) hectares in Leyda in the San Antonio Valley, 70 hectares (170 acres) in Cerro Ninquén in the Colchagua Valley, and 70 hectares (170 acres) in Las Cabras, near the Peumo area) producing 400,000 cases of wine per year.

In 2015, the wines were exported to over 50 countries, including the United States. That year, it was acquired by Accolade Wines. The acquisition included all related Anakena brands and inventory, a 3,000 tonne winery, a vineyard, Cellar Door, and tasting room. The Anakena management, managing director Ricardo Letelier and winemaker Gavin Taylor, were retained. The sum paid for the acquisition was undisclosed. Accolade said it would invest £500,000 in the brand over the following year, including Anakena named the official wine of British Tennis and the Lawn Tennis Association.

== Culture ==
The name Anakena signifies ‘bird cave’ in the Rapa Nui culture (based on the birdman legend). The legend of the Tangata manu (bird-man) tells that the Easter Island seagull, or Manu tara, hid its precious egg in a secret hideaway, or Anakena. Every year the bravest islanders swam the long distance from Rapa Nui to the islet of Motu Nui in search of the egg. The one who found it and carried it safely back to Rapa Nui was given the title of birdman, or Tangata manu, and bestowed with honour and fortune.

Anakena uses ancestral engravings and pictographs on its labels.

== Winery ==
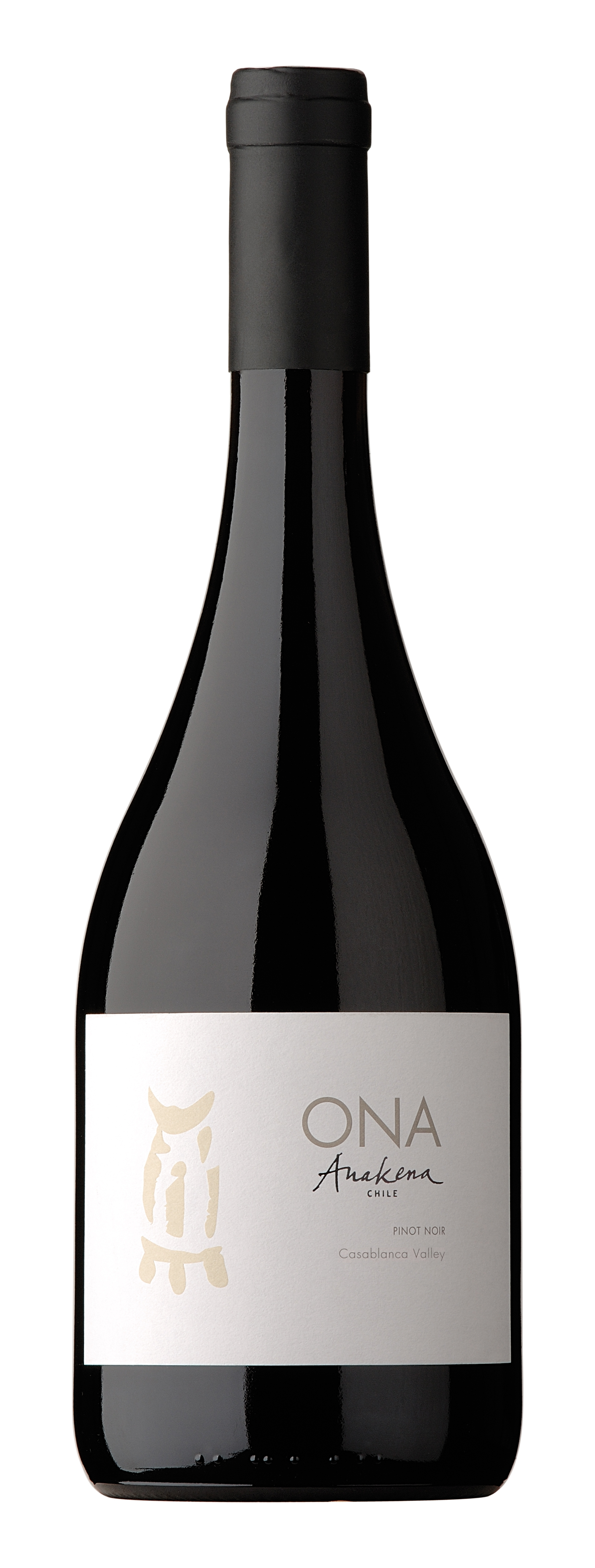
Anakena ONA Pinot noir, 2007.

Anakena’s winery is 6,600 square metres (71,000 sq ft) in size and contains 148 stainless steel tanks and 1,300 barrels, enabling the production of 3.5 million litres of wine per year. All the wines are bottled in the cellar. There is also a wine store and visitor centre. Tours of the vineyards can be arranged in advance.

In 2015, the winery's winemaker was Gavin Taylor. Winemaking at Anakena was previously overseen by chief oenologist Gonzalo Pérez. Gonzalo has been making wine for over 15 years and previously held winemaking positions at a number of Chilean wineries including Santa Rita, Viña Francisco de Aguirre, Viña Cantera and Viña Tarapacá.

== Wines ==
Varietal range:

- Cabernet Sauvignon
- Merlot
- Carmenère
- Chardonnay
- Sauvignon Blanc
- Cabernet Sauvignon Rose

Indo range:

- Merlot-Syrah
- Cabernet-Syrah
- Sauvignon Blanc
- Chardonnay

Single Vineyard range:

- Sauvignon Blanc
- Viognier
- Riesling
- Late Harvest
- Pinot Noir
- Carmenère
- Malbec
- Syrah
- Cabernet Sauvignon

ONA range:

- Sauvignon Blanc
- Riesling-Viognier-Chardonnay
- Pinot Noir-Merlot-Syrah-Viognier
- Cabernet Sauvignon-Merlot-Carmenère
- Syrah
