= Woodlands Wines =

Winery in Western Australia

- Location: 3948 Caves Road, Wilyabrup WA 6280, Australia
- Coordinates: 33°47′04″S 115°01′54″E
- Wine region: Margaret River
- Founded: 1973
- First vines planted: 1973/1974
- First vintage: 1978
- Key people: David and Heather Watson, owners; Stuart Watson and Andrew Watson, winemakers
- Known for: Cabernet Sauvignon
- Varietals: Cabernet franc, Cabernet Sauvignon, Chardonnay, Malbec, Merlot, Petit Verdot, Pinot Noir
- Tasting: Open to public
- Website: Woodlands Wines

Woodlands Wines is an Australian winery at Wilyabrup, in the Margaret River wine region of Western Australia. Established in 1973 by David and Heather Watson, it held its first vintage in 1978, and by the end of 1982 had won trophies at wine shows in Mount Barker, Perth and Canberra with its "Andrew" Cabernet Sauvignon 1981.

In the latter part of the 1980s and the early 1990s, Woodlands sold all of its harvest to other Margaret River wineries. In 1999, the Watsons began a major expansion program. Two years later, Woodlands opened a cellar door, and rejuvenated its own label.

Since then, Woodlands wines have received international acclaim; in annual blind tastings against Bordeaux wines of the same vintage, the Woodlands Margaret Reserve Cabernet Merlot has consistently been rated at or near the top.

== See also ==
- Australian wine
- List of wineries in Western Australia
- Western Australian wine
