= Sandalford Wines =

Western Australian winery business

- Location: 3210 West Swan Road, Caversham WA 6055, Australia
- Coordinates: 31°52′07″S 115°59′34″E
- Wine region: Swan District; Margaret River
- Other labels: Element
- Founded: 1840
- Known for: Margaret River Cabernet Sauvignon
- Varietals: Cabernet Sauvignon, Cabernet franc, Chardonnay, Chenin blanc, Merlot, Muscadelle, Pedro Ximénez, Riesling, Sauvignon blanc, Semillon, Shiraz, Verdelho
- Distribution: International
- Tasting: Open to the public
- Website: Sandalford Wines

Sandalford Wines is a privately owned Australian winery business based at Caversham, in the Swan Valley, the focal point of the Swan District wine region of Western Australia. Sandalford owns and operates wineries and vineyards both in Caversham and at Wilyabrup, in Western Australia's Margaret River wine region.

The company traces its origins back to 1840, when John Septimus Roe, the first Surveyor-General of the Swan River Colony, was granted 1,250 acres (510 ha) on the banks of the Swan River by Queen Victoria, in recognition of his services to the colony.

In the same year, Captain Roe planted Western Australia's first vines at the property, which he named Sandalford after an estate owned by his family on the site of a priory built in 1066. However, winemaking only became a commercial venture at Sandalford after World War II; until then it had been a hobby and a sideline.

Sandalford now also makes the wines marketed under the brand name "Element".

== See also ==
- Australian wine
- List of wineries in Western Australia
- Western Australian wine
