= The Pavilions, Bristol =

Office complex in Bristol, England

The Pavilions
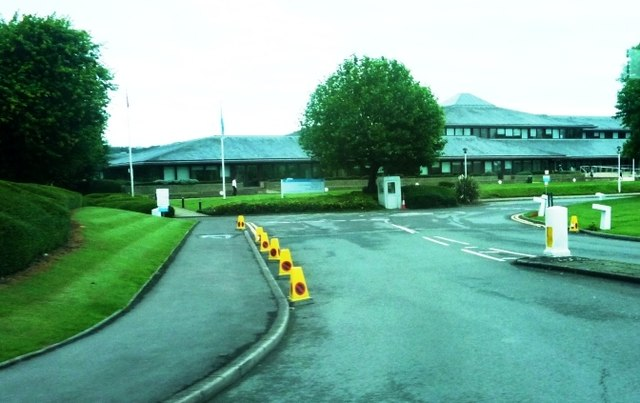
- Entrance to The Pavilions office complex off Bridgwater Road
- Interactive map of the The Pavilions area

General information
- Status: Completed
- Type: Office complex
- Architectural style: Modern
- Location: Bedminster Down, Bristol, England
- Coordinates: 51.423219°N 2.630544°W
- Construction started: 1975
- Completed: 1978
- Client: Central Electricity Generating Board

Technical details
- Floor count: 2 (plus lower ground)
- Floor area: 24,000 m²

Design and construction
- Architecture firm: Arup Associates, Peter Swann Associates
- Main contractor: Laing Management Contracting
- Designations

Listed Building – Grade II
- Official name: Former Central Electricity Generating Board HQ (The Pavilions)
- Designated: 26 January 2015
- Reference no.: 1416085

Listed Building – Grade II
- Official name: Landscape at the former CEGB Headquarters
- Designated: 26 January 2015
- Reference no.: 1419382

The Pavilions is a Grade II listed office complex at Bedminster Down, Bristol, England. Designed by Arup Associates, it was erected between 1975 and 1978 to consolidate the southwest regional operations of the Central Electricity Generating Board (CEGB) into a singular headquarters building. Its seven low-rise pavilions, arranged around landscaped courtyards, were conceived as an exemplar of energy-efficient workplace planning and retain much of their original fabric. The building and its contemporaneous designed landscape were both added to the National Heritage List for England in 2015.

== History ==
=== Design and construction (1972–1978) ===
In 1972 the CEGB resolved to unite some 1,200 staff dispersed across fourteen premises in a purpose-built headquarters. A 7.3-hectare greenfield plot on the ridge of Bedminster Down, overlooking the Avon valley, was chosen for its accessibility and capacity to accommodate the required offices, laboratories, workshops and recreational facilities. The brief demanded a low-energy building that would sit unobtrusively in the landscape.

Arup Associates, led by Nicholas Hare and Don Ferguson with building-services engineer Tony Marriott, answered with seven interlocking pavilions set on a 9.1 m grid that integrated structure, services and circulation. A central top-lit "street" linked all departments and communal spaces, and each pavilion enclosed a planted court. Heavy laboratories were sunk into the hillside, allowing the lighter offices above to exploit daylight and long views. A fallout shelter was also built as part of the plan. Construction began in 1975 under Laing Management Contracting, and practical completion was achieved in August 1978.

The scheme attracted early acclaim, receiving a Financial Times Industrial Architecture Commendation and a Civic Trust Award in 1980.

=== Adaptation and conservation (1979–present) ===
Following the staged privatisation of the electricity industry in the early 1990s the CEGB's successor bodies vacated the site, but the building's modular plan allowed individual pavilions to be let to new tenants, among them Allied Domecq, who shared the central amenities. Computershare acquired the complex in 2010, carrying out a light refurbishment that respected the principal spaces and services.

On 27 January 2015 the building and its landscape were listed at Grade II, with Historic England citing their architectural quality, environmental innovation and intact period interiors which Computershare stated they "worked hard at retaining". The complex is now split across multiple occupants; in 2023 the drinks wholesaler Matthew Clark signed a ten-year lease for Pavilion 2.

== Architecture ==
The seven square pavilions are stepped with the natural gradient of the site so that the highest roofline rises little more than two storeys above the surrounding fields. Load-bearing concrete block walls containing pulverised fuel ash aggregate support laminated timber trusses, above which low-pitched slate roofs are punctuated by pyramidal lanterns. Broad eaves and a continuous double-skin perimeter wall mediate between building and landscape while concealing sunken sections of the building.

The environmental strategy minimises purchased energy. Night-time ventilation cools the hollow concrete floor slabs which then tempers daytime heat gains, while surplus heat from computing equipment and standby generators is recovered by heat pumps for space heating and hot-water production. A swimming pool originally provided additional thermal storage. The façade glazing is fitted with integral blinds, coupled with wide eaves, thus keeping most spaces within 22–23°C without need for air conditioning.

The landscape, developed by Peter Swann Associates, consists of earthworks and extensive indigenous planting to merge the site with its neighbouring area and distant views towards Clifton and Ashton Court. Historic England has described the complex as "an unusually strong and coherent entity".

== See also ==
- Grade II listed buildings in Bristol
