= Busselton Health Study =

Long-term health study of Busselton residents

The Busselton Health Study is a long-term, on-going health cohort study of residents of the Western Australian city of Busselton. Over 20,000 Busselton residents have participated in surveys concerning such health topics as cardiovascular disease, pulmonary function, diabetes, and cancer, resulting in over 400 publications. The program was initiated by Kevin Cullen, a local general practitioner, and is administered by the Busselton Population Medical Research Institute, which was established in 2000 as the Busselton Population Medical Research Foundation, and the School of Population and Global Health, University of Western Australia. Data from the study was used in a 1996 paper in Nature showing some of the first genetic links to asthma, along with a 1999 paper in the New England Journal of Medicine that was the first to describe the impact of the newly discovered HFE gene causing HFE hereditary haemochromatosis on a population with normal rates of symptoms.

== Projects ==
The Busselton Health Survey has included the following projects:

- 1966, 1969, 1972, 1975, 1978, and 1981: Cross-sectional comprehensive surveys of all adults on the Electoral roll (3,400–4,000 participants)
- 1967, 1970, 1973, 1977, and 1983: Cross-sectional comprehensive surveys of school students (high-school only in 1977, in which there were 556 participants; about 1,600 in all other years)
- 1987: Cross-sectional comprehensive surveys of all people aged over 65 (1,120 participants)
- 1990: Cross-sectional respiratory questionnaire of all adults on the electoral roll (3,800 participants)
- 1992: Family asthma survey (250 families with two parents and two children)
- 1994–1995: Followup of all participants in cross-sectional surveys from 1966 to 1983 (5,715 participants)
- 2005–2008: Survey of the changing prevalence of asthma and Chronic obstructive pulmonary disease (over 2,900 adults and 1,500 children)
- 2007–present: The Prevalence of Sleep Disordered Breathing
- 2007–2008: Participated in the international Burden of obstructive lung disease study (more than 600 participants aged over 40)
- 2008–2010: Busselton Diabetes Study, based on Fremantle Diabetes Study (200 people with diabetes and 200 matched controls
- 2010–2021: Busselton Healthy Ageing Study (over 5,100 people born between 1946 and 1964)
- 2019–2023: Busselton Respiratory Study (aiming to recruit over 3,000 adults)

== See also ==
- Caerphilly Heart Disease Study
- China–Cornell–Oxford Project
- Framingham Heart Study
