= Vinarchy =

Global wine business

Coordinates: 35°05′39″S 138°32′36″E

- Formerly: Thomas Hardy and Sons; BRL Hardy; The Hardy Wine Company; Constellation Wines Australia; Accolade Wines; Pernod Ricard Winemakers
- Type: Private equity
- Industry: Wine
- Founded: 1853; 173 years ago in Old Reynella, South Australia
- Headquarters: Old Reynella, South Australia
- Key people: Robert Foye, Chief Executive Officer
- Brands: Amberley; Anakena; Atlas Peak; Azpilicueta; Banrock Station; Bay of Fires; Berri Estates; Brancott Estate; Brookland Valley Estate; Campo Viejo; Church Road; Country Manor; Da Luca; Echo Falls; Eddystone Point; Fish Hoek; Flagstone; Geyser Peak; Ginger Joe; Goundrey; Grant Burge; Hardys; Houghton Wines; House of Arras; Jack Rabbit; Jacob's Creek; Knappstein; Kumala; Leasingham; Le Portail des Coteaux; Mezzomondo; Moondah Brook; Mud House; Omni; Orlando; Petaluma; QC Cream; Renmano; Reynella; Rolf Binder Wines; Sir James; St Hallett; St Hugo; Stoneleigh; Stanley; Stones; Stowells; Ta Ku; Tarsus; Tatachilla; Tintara; Turner Road; Waipara Hills; William Hardy; XYZin; Yarra Burn; Ysios
- Website: vinarchy.com

Vinarchy is an international wine business formed from the purchase of Pernod Ricard's international wine business arm, Pernod Ricard Winemakers, by the Australian wine giant, Accolade Wines. It has headquarters in South Australia and corporate offices in Melbourne. As of June 2025, Vinarchy produces 32 million cases of wine annually, with A$1.5 billion in annual net sales revenues.

== Overview ==
Seven years after being acquired by the American private equity firm Carlyle Group, Accolade Wines merged with Pernod Ricard Winemakers to form Vinarchy. This comes after selling its portfolio to Australian Wine Holdco, a consortium of international investment investors comprising Bain Capital, Intermediate Capital Group, Capital Four, Sona Asset Management, and Samuel Terry Asset Management.

Accolade, which predominantly used the Hardy's label, was one of the worlds largest winemakers, having more than 1700 employees around the world, with operations in North America, the United Kingdom, Ireland, mainland Europe, South Africa, Australia, New Zealand and Asia. In 2022 it was ranked the second largest Australian wine company by both production and total revenue.

== History ==
=== Thomas Hardy and Sons ===
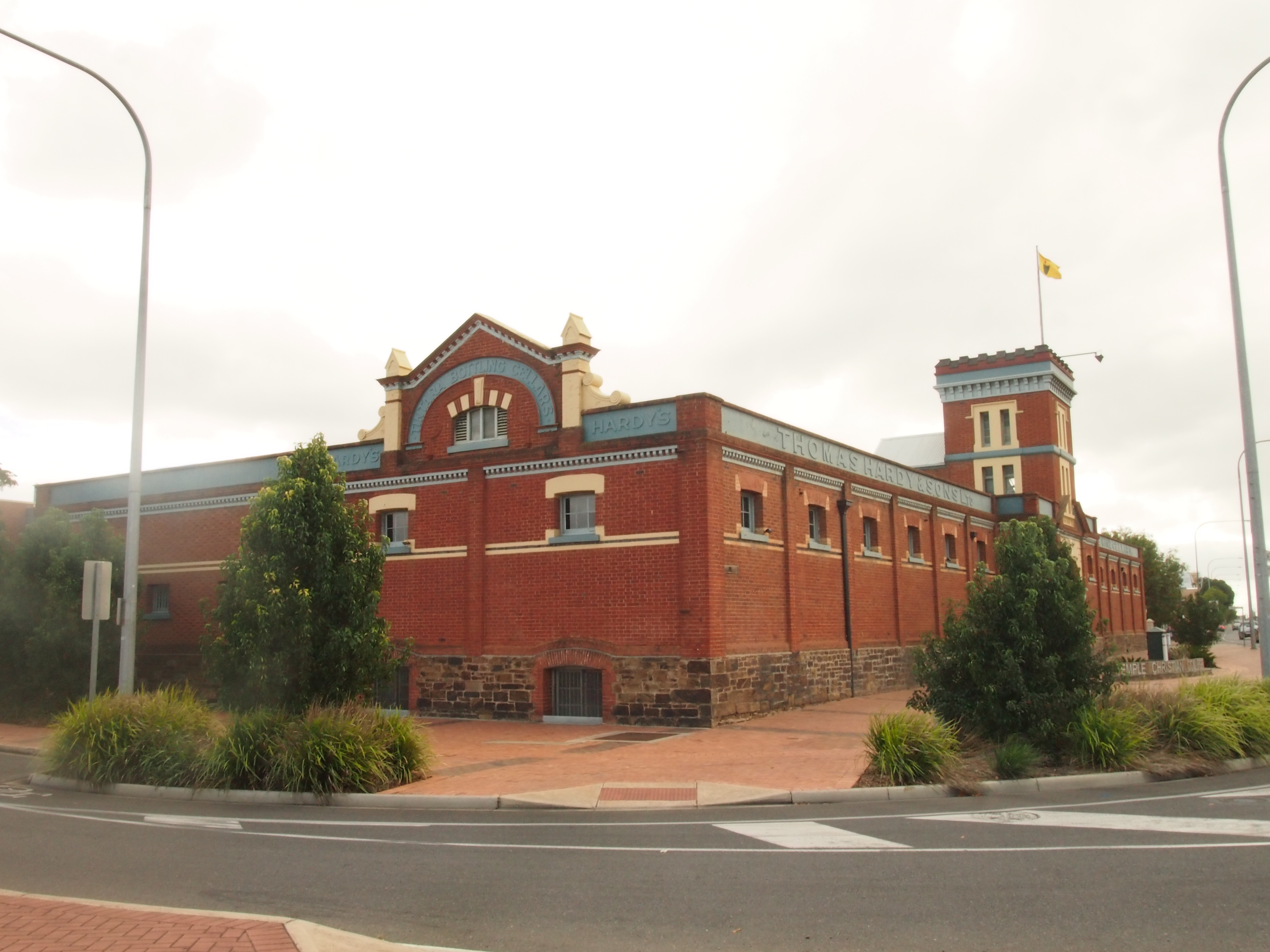
Former Thomas Hardy & Sons Ltd Wine Cellars, 1893, at Mile End

Accolade Wines traces its beginning to Thomas Hardy and Sons, a company founded in 1853 which grew to become Australia's largest winemaker. The company headquarters are in Old Reynella, South Australia.

At 20 years of age, Thomas Hardy arrived in South Australia after sailing from the English county of Devon in 1850. He worked at Reynella Farm for John Reynell, then drove cattle to the Victorian goldfields. Hardy used the money he had earned to purchase a property on the banks of the River Torrens, which he named 'Bankside'. Shiraz and Grenache vines were planted on the Bankside property. Wine was sold locally and in England, and the profits enabled Hardy to buy the Tintara Vineyard Company about 1876. Hardy steadily expanded the company over the years, purchasing a bottling plant at Mile End, cellars on Currie Street in Adelaide, and a disused flour mill in McLaren Vale.

In 1938, then chairman Tom Mayfield Hardy was killed in an aeroplane crash along with other leading South Australian winemakers. His cousin, Kenneth Hardy, became chairman. In 1968, the company established extensive vineyards in the Padthaway area. In 1976, Thomas Hardy and Sons made its first corporate acquisition by purchasing the London-based Emu Wine Company, which included Houghton (Western Australia's largest winery) and Morphett Vale. In 1982, the company purchased Chateau Reynella, where Thomas Hardy had first worked, and converted it to its headquarters. In 1989, the company sold a portion of the Houghton Estate known as "Oakover Grounds" to a Swan Valley family. Further expansion came in 1992, when Thomas Hardy & Sons merged with Berri Renmano Limited to form what then became Australia's second largest wine group, BRL Hardy Limited.

In 2003, the brands of BRL Hardy and those of Constellation Brands were merged to create the world's largest international wine business. BRL Hardy Limited was renamed The Hardy Wine Company. In 2006, Constellation Brands acquired Vincor International, adding the West Australian brands of Amberley and Goundrey to the Hardy portfolio. On 31 March 2008, The Hardy Wine Company changed its name to Constellation Wines Australia.

=== Accolade Wines: 2011-2025 ===
In February 2011, Constellation Brands sold 80 per cent of Constellation Wines Australia, along with sister company Constellation Europe, to CHAMP Private Equity. Constellation Brands retained a 20% stake in the newly named Accolade Wines. In October 2015, Accolade sold its 50% share to British drinks distributor Matthew Clark. In November 2016, the company acquired the Australian premium wine portfolio (Fine Wine Partners) of beverage giant Lion.

In March 2017, CHAMP Private Equity scrapped its plans to float Accolade on the Australian Securities Exchange. The decision was made after overtures from potential Chinese buyers, and a drop in the value of the British pound due to Brexit. Until 2018, the company was 80 per cent owned by the Australian private equity firm CHAMP Private Equity and 20 per cent owned by the United-States-based alcohol giant Constellation Brands. 100% of the company was sold to the Carlyle Group in 2018. In October 2019, Accolade divested itself of the historic vineyards and buildings at the Houghton Estate in the Swan Valley to move production of Houghton Wines to its Nannup facility. The site was purchased by the Yukich family that had previously purchased the Oakover Grounds portion of the estate. The old Houghton site is now known as Nikola Estate.

=== Vinarchy: 2025-2026 ===
Australian Wine Holdco acquired Accolade Wines from Carlyle Group in 2024, by taking Accolade Wines' debt on in exchange for shares. In July 2024, Accolade announced it would merge with Pernod Ricard Winemakers, and the sale of Pernod Ricard to Australian Wine Holdco was completed in April 2025 for an undisclosed price. Accolade was merged with Pernod Ricard to form the company Vinarchy following the sale to Australian Wine Holdco Limited (AWL), a consortium of international institutional investors which comprises funds backed by Bain Capital, Intermediate Capital Group, Capital Four, Sona Asset Management and Samuel Terry Asset Management. In June 2025, Australian Wine Holdco was seeking an A$700 million ($454 million) loan for financing Vinarchy.

Vinarchy in mid 2025 was the second-largest wine group in Australia, and was primarily supplied by CCW Cooperative, an organization of 500 grape growers in Australia. Ben Clarke was Vinarchy chairman. In June 2025, it was reported that Vinarchy was investing AU$100 in the Rowland Flat and Berri Estates in Riverland, with Berri Estates to become its primary logistics site. ABC described the closure of Banrock Station cellar by Vinarchy in June 2025 as a "shock" to the region.

By May 2025, Vinarchy had cut its "&Then" zero alcohol wines, and was planning on cutting 50 of its 150 brands. In August 2025, Vinarchy released two new box wines.In November 2025, Vinarchy CEO Danny Celoni said the company was considering culling around 60 brands, or up to 40 percent of its total, from its portfolio over two years, shifting to smaller bottles to appeal to selective customers. It said it would invest more in its labels Hardys, Jacob's Creek, and Campo Viejo.

== Operations ==
Vinarchy sells its products in over 80 countries throughout Australasia, North America, Asia, and Europe. It has branch offices in the United Kingdom (Weybridge and Bristol), Australia (Adelaide, Sydney, Brisbane, Perth and Melbourne), and South Africa (Stellenbosch), as well as in Moscow, Warsaw, Shanghai, Singapore, Beijing and California.

As of June 2025, Vinarchy produces 32 million cases of wine annually, with $1.5 billion in annual net sales revenues.

The business is the largest wine company by volume and value in the United Kingdom and Ireland, a highly-competitive market with thin margins. Its popular brands there include Hardys, Kumala, Echo Falls, Stowells, and Banrock Station.

== Wine labels / Brands ==
Winery/Brand	Region	Country	External link	Notes
Amberley Estate	Western Australia	Australia		
Anakena		Chile		Acquired 2015
Atlas Peak	Napa Valley	North America		
Banrock Station	South Australia	Australia		Custodian of Banrock Station Wetland Complex
Bay of Fires	Tasmania	Australia		
Berri Estates	South Australia	Australia		
Brookland Valley	Margaret River	Australia		
Country Manor		United Kingdom		
Croser		Australia		
Da Luca		Italy		
Drylands	Marlborough	New Zealand		Agent only (for the Pacific, Japan and United Kingdom).
Echo Falls		North America		Includes Fruit Fusion range released 2015
Eddystone Point	Tasmania	Australia		
Fish Hoek		South Africa		
Flagstone		South Africa		
Geyser Peak	Alexander Valley	North America		
Ginger Joe		United Kingdom		Alcoholic ginger beer.
Goundrey	Western Australia	Australia		
Grant Burge Wines	Barossa	Australia		Acquired 2014.
Gran Tierra		Chile		
Hardys	(various)	Australia		Named world's second strongest wine brand in 2008.
Houghton	Swan Valley	Australia		
Jack Rabbit		"Other"		
Jam Shed	South Australia	Australia		brand from Leasingham
Knappstein	Clare Valley	Australia		From Lion
Kumala		South Africa		
Leasingham	Clare Valley	Australia		Label only?
Le Portail des Coteaux				
Mezzomondo		Italy		
Moondah Brook	Western Australia	Australia		
Monkey Bay		New Zealand		Agent only (for the Pacific, Japan and United Kingdom).
Mud House	(various)	New Zealand		
Nobilo		New Zealand		Agent only (for the Pacific, Japan and United Kingdom).
Omni		Australia		
Paul Masson Winery		North America		Agent only (for Australia, Pacific, Japan, United Kingdom).
Petaluma	South Australia	Australia		
Ravenswood		North America		Agent only (for Australia, Pacific, Japan, United Kingdom).
Renmano		Australia		
Reynella		Australia		
Robert Mondavi		North America		Agent only (for Australia, Pacific, Japan, United Kingdom).
Rolf Binder Wines	Barossa Valley	Australia		
Stanley Wines		Australia		
Starve Dog Lane		Australia		
St Hallett	Barossa Valley	Australia		From Lion
Stones		United Kingdom		Ginger wine
Stowells	(various)	"Other"		On-premise brand, sold in the UK, of wines from around the world.
Ta Ku	(various)	New Zealand		
Tatachilla	McLaren Vale	Australia		From Lion
Tintara				
Turner Road		North America		
Waipara Hills	Marlborough	New Zealand		
William Hardy	South Australia	Australia		
Yarra Burn	Yarra Valley	Australia		Sparkling wine
XYZin		North America		

== See also ==
- Australian wine
- Cult wine
- South Australian wine
- List of wineries in McLaren Vale
- Constellation Brands
- James Hardy – former chairman.
