= Kenwood Vineyards =

Former winery in Kenwood, California

- Location: Kenwood, California, USA
- Coordinates: 38°25′00″N 122°32′36″W
- Founded: 1970–2026
- Parent company: Pernod Ricard Winemakers
- Varietals: Chardonnay, Sauvignon blanc, Pinot gris, Pinot noir, Merlot, Syrah, Cabernet Sauvignon, Zinfandel, White Zinfandel, Sparkling wine
- Tasting: Open to the public
- Website: http://kenwoodvineyards.com/

Kenwood Vineyards was a winery in Kenwood, California, located on Highway 12 in the Sonoma Valley wine country. It was owned by Pernod Ricard Winemakers.

== History ==
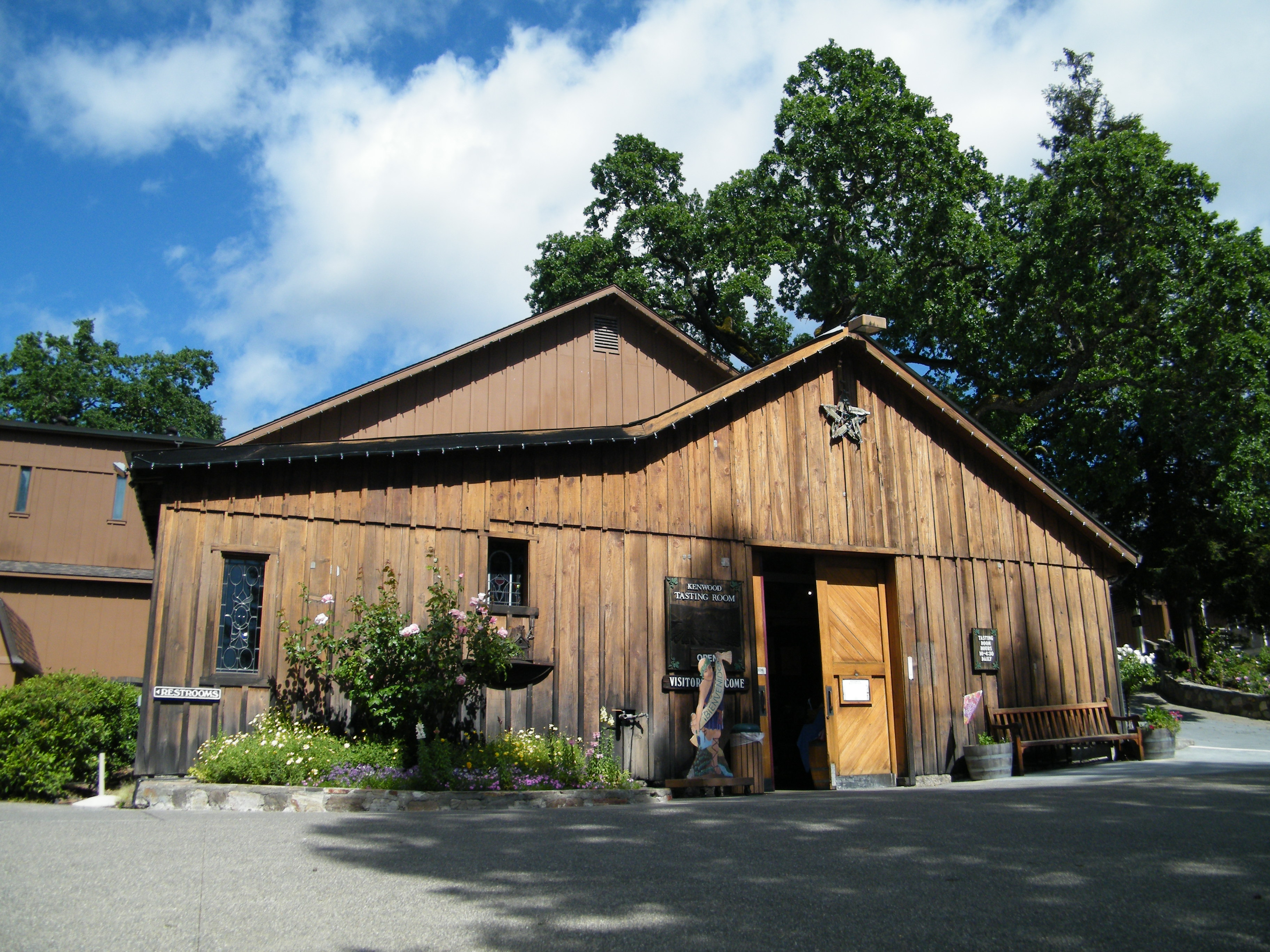
Kenwood Vineyards tasting room

Kenwood Vineyards was established in 1970 at the site of the former Pagani Brothers Winery, a historic wine cellar built in 1906. It was founded in 1970 by John Sheela and his brothers-in-law, Mike and Marty Lee. They converted the jug wine facility into a modern winery.

In 1975, winemaker Mike Lee hired Stan Stupich as a "cellar rat". Stupich remains a winemaker at Kenwood today.

In 1976, Kenwood Vineyards acquired the exclusive rights to source grapes from the historic vineyards of Jack London Ranch.

In 1978, local artist David Lance Goines was commissioned to create an original artwork to be used for the label of the 1975 reserve Cabernet Sauvignon. This was the first vintage of the Artist Series.

Pat Henderson began working at Kenwood as a harvest intern in 1983. He left that year to attend U.C. Davis, but returned after graduation to be their winemaker for 9 years. When Mike Lee retired in 2003, Pat Henderson became Kenwood's as senior winemaker.

In the early 1990s, a series of restaurant wines was launched, which included single varietals and blended wines.

In 1996, F. Korbel & Bros., Inc. acquired a 50 percent stake in the winery. In 1999, Korbel acquired the remaining 50 percent and bought out the founders. Under Korbel's management, Kenwood nearly doubled in size. In 1996, they produced less than 300,000 cases. In 1999, they produced more than 500,000 cases.

In 2011, co-founder and winemaker Mike Lee died. Lee was called a "visionary winemaker" and a "master vintner" by The Press Democrat. In the 1970s, Lee helped establish Sonoma Valley as one of the first American Viticultural Areas at a time when the region was known for jug wine.

In 2012, Korbel had a failed sale of the company to New York-based Banfi Vintners. The deal had been announced in March 2012, but fell apart by July 2012. The deal would have included Kenwood’s winery, 22 acres of estate vineyards and all other assets. The reason for the failed purchase was not disclosed due to confidentiality agreements and the expected purchase price was not disclosed.

Korbel owner and president Gary Heck explained that the rationale for wanting to sell the company was to prioritize the company's sparkling wine business. Said Heck, “Kenwood produces more than 550,000 cases of wine a year. It takes a lot of work and effort. It’s very profitable, but sparkling wine [consumption] is now at an all-time high [in America], so we want to put all our executive effort and focus on it.”

In 2014, Pernod Ricard Winemakers acquired premium wine brand Kenwood Vineyards. The sum of the sale was undisclosed but was estimated by Reuters at less than $100 million.

== Wines ==
The Sonoma Series wines were the first produced at Kenwood Vineyards. The first two varietals were Zinfandel and Cabernet Sauvignon. Chardonnay, Sauvignon Blanc, Pinot Gris, Merlot, and Pinot Noir followed in later years. Kenwood Vineyards received early praise for its bottlings of Chardonnay, Zinfandel.

The Artist Series was a reserve Sonoma County Cabernet Sauvignon with a label that was redesigned annually to feature a work of art by a notable artist. Artwork styles include impressionist, romantic, modern, and abstract. The first vintage was 1975. The Artist Series was highly regarded, according to Wine Spectator, and received critical acclaim. The Artist Series was California's first artist created wine label. Labels have featured art by Charles Mingus (1978), Joan Miró (1987), Pablo Picasso (1989), Henry Miller (1992), Alexander Calder (1993), Wayne Thiebaud (1996), Shepard Fairey (2004), Paul Klee (2006), and Dave Kinsey (2007). Original art by David Lance Goines was commissioned for the label for the first vintage (1975). The piece, "Reclining Nude in Vineyard," was deemed "obscene and indecent" by the Bureau of Tobacco and Firearms, the federal government regulatory agency that approved wine labeling, under 27 CFR 4.39 in the Code of Federal Regulations. The "naked lady label," as it came to be known, was eventually featured as the art for the 1994 vintage.

The Yulupa Series wines were bottled exclusively for the restaurant market. Varietals included Chardonnay, White Zinfandel, Merlot, Zinfandel, Cabernet Sauvignon, and a sparkling wine called Cuvée Brut. Grapes for these wines were sourced from across California and bottles list California on the labels as the appellation. These wines are considered budget wines.

The winery focused on "small lot" winemaking, with each lot from each vineyard kept separate throughout the winemaking process. In addition to the 23-acre vineyard surrounding the winery, Kenwood produced wines from several Sonoma County appellations, including Russian River Valley, Alexander Valley, Dry Creek Valley, Sonoma Valley, and Sonoma Mountain.

Kenwood Vineyards was the exclusive producer of wines from the historic vineyards of Jack London Ranch, located on the western slope of Sonoma Valley in Glen Ellen, California. The first vintage of Kenwood Vineyards' Jack London Cabernet Sauvignon was in 1977. Kenwood managed the 130-acre vineyard and produced Cabernet Sauvignon, Merlot, Zinfandel and Syrah grown on hillsides that were first terraced by the author Jack London. The Jack London Series was one of the first vineyard-designated wines in Sonoma.

== See also ==
- Pernod Ricard Winemakers
- Sonoma County wine
- Sonoma County Historic Landmarks and Districts
