= Brancott Estate =

New Zealand wine producer

- Formerly: Montana Wines
- Type: Wholly owned subsidiary
- Industry: wine
- Founded: 1961
- Headquarters: Auckland, New Zealand
- Number of employees: 750 (permanent)
- Parent: Vinarchy
- Website: https://www.brancottestate.com/

Brancott Estate is the brand adopted since 2010 by Pernod Ricard for New Zealand's largest wine producer, formerly Montana Wines, which now operates as the New Zealand division of Pernod Ricard Winemakers. The name comes from its Brancott winery in Blenheim, and was chosen to reduce confusion in the United States market with wines from the state of Montana.

The winery has been significant enough throughout New Zealand's wine history that the Montana name is still used on domestic labelling due to its strong brand recognition.

== History of Montana Wines ==
Montana was founded by Ivan and Amanda Yukich (Jukić), Croatian immigrants who planted their first vines in 1934, Titirangi (Scenic Drive, Titirangi), situated in the Waitākere Ranges west of Auckland. The first wine was sold in 1944, and by 1960 10 hectares (25 acres) of vineyards were planted. Two of Ivan's son's, Mate and Frank, had become involved, and they set up the company Montana Wines in 1961. By the end of the 1960s, the company had expanded further, planting vines on land south of Auckland. In 1973, the company expanded into Gisborne and Marlborough and exported its first wines in 1980. Montana was listed on the New Zealand Stock Exchange, initially as 'Corporate Investments Limited', and then as Montana Wines. It was the main sponsor of the Montana New Zealand Book Awards from 1994 to 2009.

In 2000, Montana successfully purchased Corbans Wines, New Zealand's second largest producer at the time, to control 60% of domestic wine sales and a large majority of the country's wine exports. Montana was then itself taken over by the British firm Allied Domecq in 2001 after eventually outbidding Lion Nathan, and four years later Allied Domecq was bought by Pernod Ricard in 2005.

In 2010, Pernod Ricard sold off several of its brands, including Lindauer and Corbans Wines, to a partnership formed between Lion and Indevin, another large New Zealand wine operator.

== Wineries ==
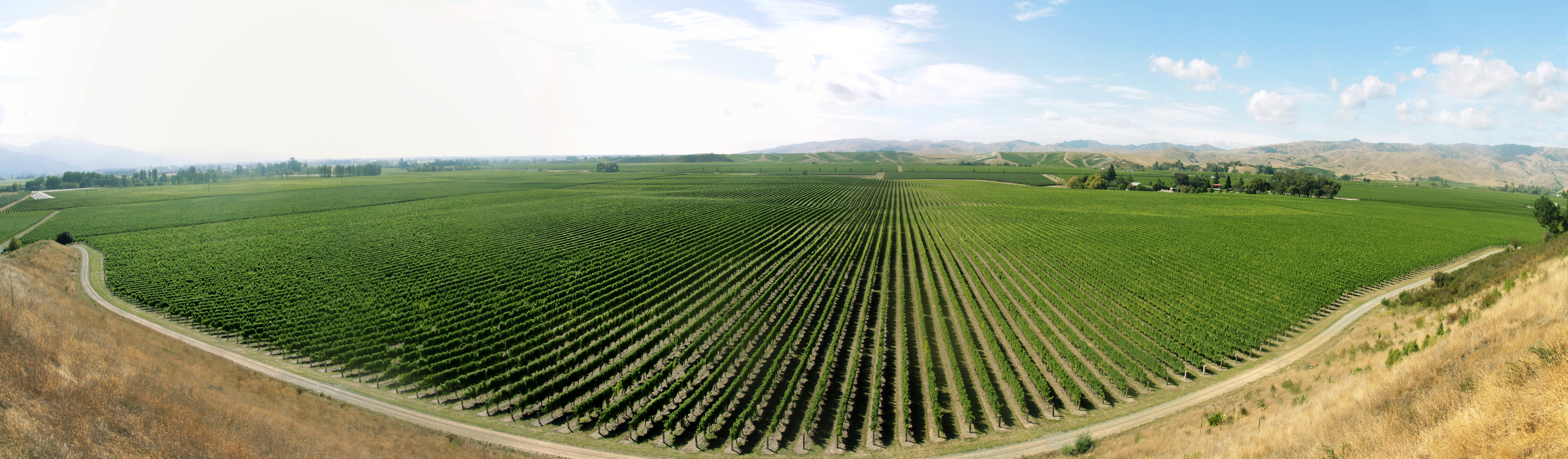
Part of the Brancott vineyards, Marlborough.

Montana Wines at various times has had several wineries spread around the country.

=== Brancott Winery ===
Located on State Highway 1, just south of Blenheim, the Brancott winery was opened in 1977 and produces all of its Marlborough wines (mostly Sauvignon Blanc), and wine from Waipara vineyards as well. Many of the grapes for Montana's sparkling wines are pressed here, but secondary fermentation is carried out at the Tamaki Winery.

=== Church Road Winery ===
Founded in 1897, the Church Road Winery is one of the three oldest in the Hawkes Bay. The first commercial Cabernet Sauvignon in New Zealand was produced here in 1949 by Tom McDonald. The Church Road facility was purchased by Montana in 1988. In recent years, the winery has increased its operation (with the closure of the Corbans Hawke's Bay winery) and the expansion of the Church Road brand portfolio.

=== Corbans Winery ===
The Corbans winery was established by McWilliam's Wines in 1981, changing hands to Cooks in 1984, Corbans in 1987, and Montana in 2000. It was a more commercial scale facility than Church Road and contributed to Longridge, Corbans, Verde, Huntaway and Robard & Butler brands. The Corbans brand was sold to Lion in 2010, and in 2012 the winery was closed with most of its production integrated into the nearby Church Road facility.

=== Montana Gisborne Winery ===
The Montana Gisborne Winery was one of the largest wine-making facilities in the country. Montana's original facility was acquired in 1973, from the business established by Fredrich Wohnsiedler (whose name lived on for a long time in a Montana product line). Two further adjacent facilities were incorporated, from Penfolds NZ in 1986 and Corbans in 2000. In 2010, Pernod Ricard sold the winery and some associated brands to the Lion Indevin partnership.

=== Tamaki Winery ===
All Montana wines are bottled at the Tamaki Winery in Auckland, opened in 1975. This also means that all sparkling wines undergo secondary fermentation (in the bottle) in Auckland.

== Key Brands ==
Pernod-Ricard operates several different brands in New Zealand. Ranked approximately in order of prestige.

=== Church Road ===
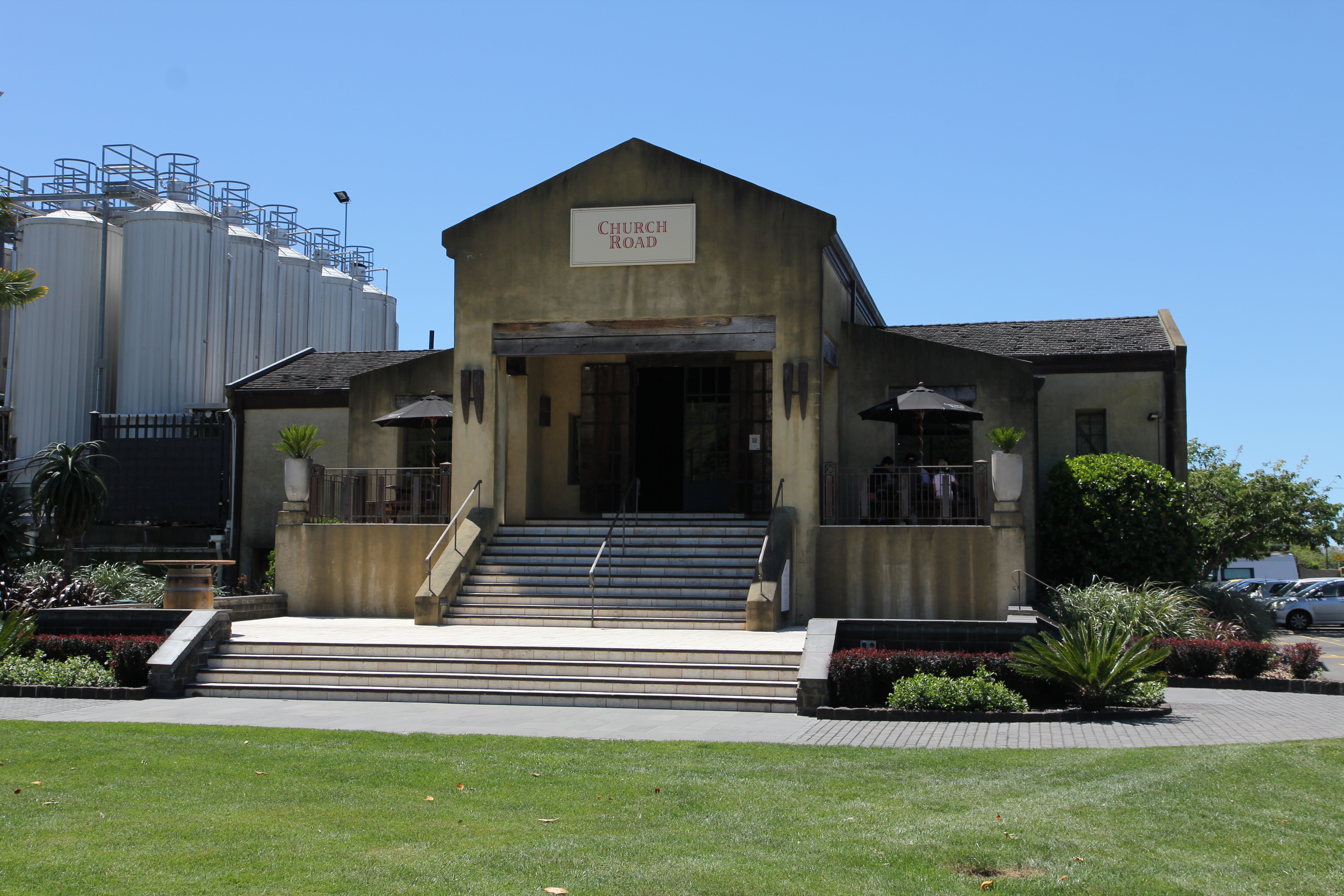
Church Road cellar door

Originally the Tom McDonald Winery, the Church Road Winery in Taradale near Napier represents a flagship brand. It produces mainly Merlot-Cabernet blends, Syrah, Chardonnay, Pinot Gris, and Sauvignon Blanc in several tiers. In order of price, the Tom wines are positioned at the premium end of the market and are some of New Zealand's most expensive wines. Next are the Grand Reserve and McDonald Series ranges, and finally the range of cheaper white-label Church Road wines are available in supermarkets.

=== Montana Wines, Brancott Estate ===
In 2010, Montana Wines was renamed Brancott Estate, where its wines had already been sold for over a decade with this label. Today only its Winemaker Series of wines carries the Montana brand name within New Zealand, since there is still strong Montana brand recognition and association with New Zealand wine. Ironically, some of the Montana labelled wines are made with grapes from Australia.

Montana has several levels of wines under the label Brancott Estate. The most prestigious 'estate' label is the Letter Series, a range of Marlborough only wines. The letter used to relate to the name of the vineyard when wines came from other regions previously (e.g. O for Ormond, Gisborne).

- Letter Series; "B" Sauvignon Blanc, "O" Chardonnay, "P" Gewürztraminer, "T" Pinot Noir, "R" Sauvignon Gris, "F" Pinot Gris.

Available wine series (in no particular order);

- Montana Winemaker Series
- Brancott Estate Series
- Brancott Estate single region Terroir Series
- Brancott Estate Letter Series
- Brancott Estate organic Living Land Series
- Brancott Estate low alcohol Flight Series
- Brancott Estate Sparkling Series (including a sparkling Sauvignon Blanc and Pinot Gris)

=== Deutz ===
From 1988, Montana's premium sparkling wine brand has been a collaboration with Champagne Deutz of France.

- Deutz Marlborough Cuvée
- Deutz Blanc de Blanc
- Deutz Pinot Noir Cuvée.

=== Stoneleigh ===
A Marlborough-based vineyard producing mostly mid-market white wines, and using light-coloured stones in the vineyard to reflect sunlight up into the canopy to improve ripening.
