= Matthew Clark =

U.K.-based drinks distributor

- Company type: Private Limited
- Industry: Alcohol wholesale
- Founded: 1810; 216 years ago
- Headquarters: Bristol, United Kingdom
- Number of employees: 1300+
- Parent: C&C Group
- Website: www.matthewclark.co.uk

Matthew Clark is a United Kingdom-based drinks distributor, owned by C&C Group. Founded in 1810, the business primarily serves public houses, restaurants, bars and hotels within the mainland UK.

== History ==
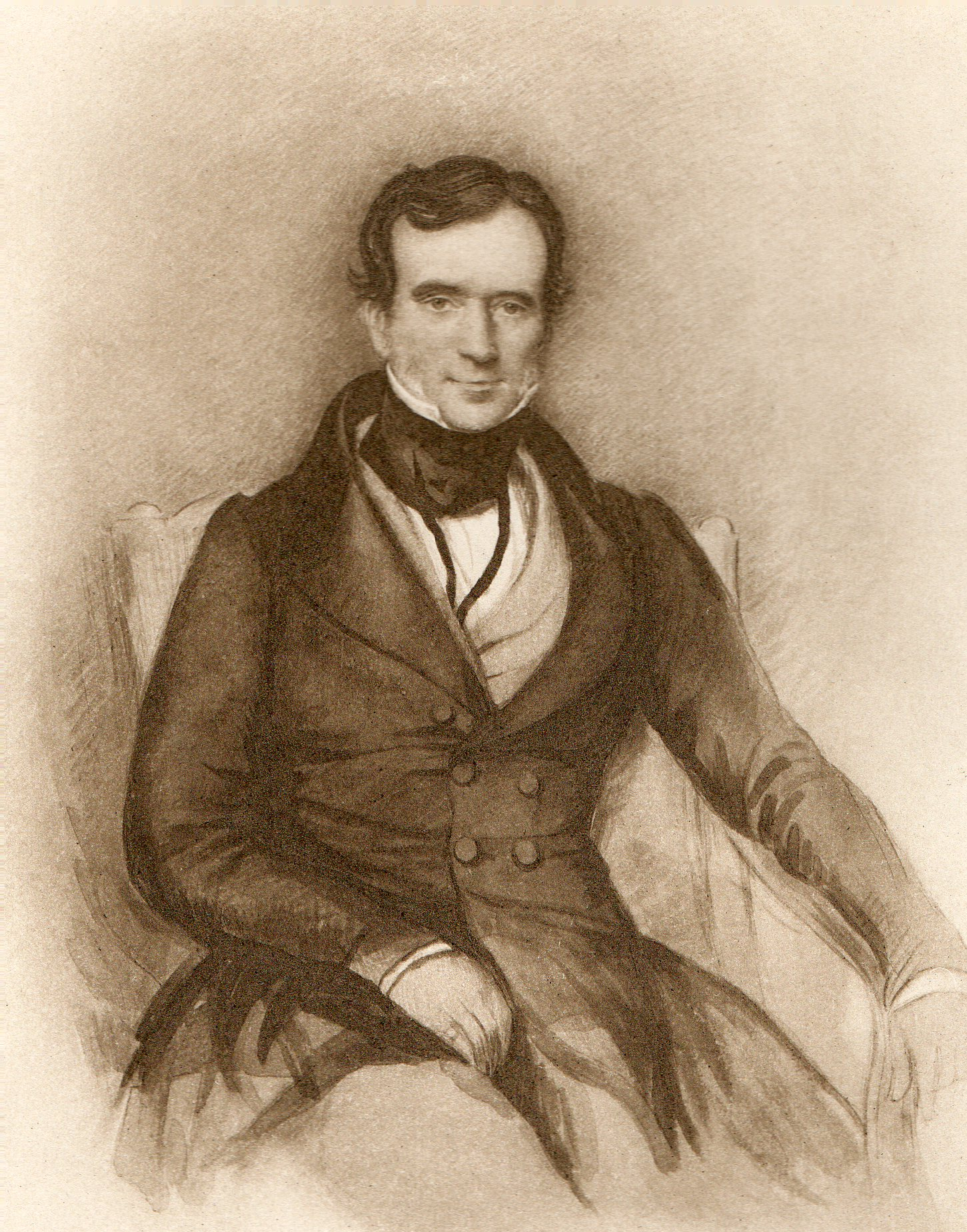
Matthew Clark, 1786-1868, founder of Matthew Clark & Sons

The company was formed in 1810 by Matthew Clark, the son of Charles Clark, Inspector General of Imported Liquors and Distillery at the Port of London and later Merchants' Gauger of wines and spirits for the City of London merchants. It was known for most of its history as a City of London wine and spirit importer called Matthew Clark and Sons. Six generations of the Clark/Gordon Clark family worked in it while it was an independent company. It was originally based in Great Tower Street, then from 1925 at 14 Trinity Square, Tower Hill, from 1956 at Walbrook House, and from 1972 at the Finsbury Distillery, the premises of the firm of that name, manufacturers of Stone's Ginger wine, taken over in 1964.

The Leeds-based firm of J. E. Mather, manufacturer of "Barchester British Wine", was taken over 1965-7. But the main business of the firm was that of representing foreign companies, principally from 1814 J. & F. Martell of Cognac, the great French brandy house, John DeKuyper & Son of Rotterdam, manufacturers of gin, by 1827, and up to 1925 Pedro Domecq, the sherry producers of Jerez de la Frontera. The archives of the firm were deposited in the Guildhall Library and are now in the London Metropolitan Archives; they are of considerable interest for the history of the wine and spirit trade in the 19th and early 20th century.

In 1990, after listing on the London Stock Exchange, the company began acquiring other drinks manufacturers and distributors, including:

- Grants of St James's
- Gaymer Cider Company
- Taunton Cider Company
- Freetraders
- Dunn and Moore
- Griersons

In 1998, Matthew Clark plc was acquired by Constellation Brands Inc of the United States. In 2002, the company acquired Forth Wines. In 2007 Constellation sold a 50% stake to Punch Taverns.

In 2010, the cider businesses were sold to C&C Group plc of Ireland, leaving Matthew Clark as an alcohol wholesaler.

In January 2011, Constellation Brands Inc divested 80% of its European business, Constellation Europe, along with its sister company, Constellation Wines Australia, to Australian private equity company, CHAMP Private Equity. Subsequently, in 2011 Constellation Europe and Constellation Wines Australia together became Accolade Wines.

In October 2015, Accolade Wines and Punch Taverns sold their respective 50% holdings to Conviviality plc in a £200 million deal. Matthew Clark operated within the 'Conviviality Direct' business unit which, along with the Bibendum brand, served over 23,000 outlets, consisting of national chains to independent food-led pubs and restaurants.

In March 2018, Conviviality said it faced bankruptcy unless it could raise £125m, as it issued its third profits warning in a month. It failed to do so, and at the end of March, Conviviality announced its intention to appoint administrators within a fortnight, putting 2,600 jobs across the group at risk. Conviviality Direct, including Matthew Clark and Bibendum, was sold to C&C Group in April 2018 as part of a 'pre-pack' administration deal.

== Operations ==
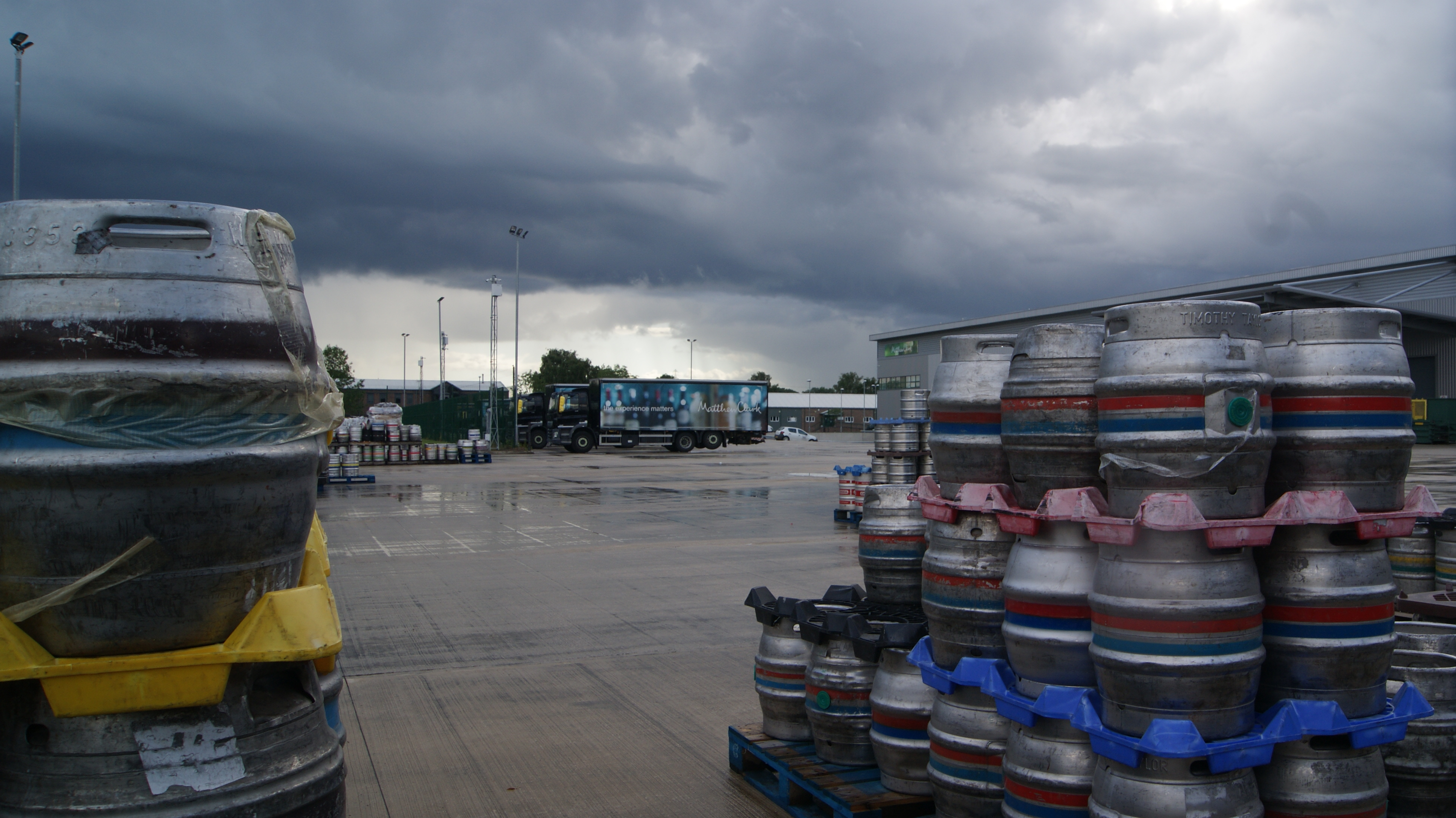
Matthew Clark distribution centre on the Thorp Arch Trading Estate near Wetherby, West Yorkshire.

Matthew Clark is currently based in Bristol, where its head office in The Pavilions is located. It has a sales force of over 230 employees deployed across the country. Matthew Clark offers a range of over 7,000 alcohol lines with next day delivery.
