= Pernod Ricard Winemakers =

Wholly owned wine subsidiary of Pernod Ricard

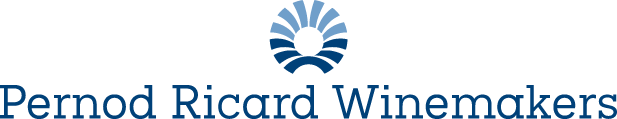
- Industry: Wine
- Founded: 2010; 16 years ago
- Headquarters: Sydney, Australia
- Owner: Australian Wine Holdco
- Parent: Bain Capital; Intermediate Capital Group; Capital Four; Sona Asset Management; Samuel Terry Asset Management
- Website: www.pernod-ricard-winemakers.com

Pernod Ricard Winemakers was the wholly owned wine subsidiary of French wine and spirits producer Pernod Ricard, which is one of the largest alcoholic beverage companies in the world. In 2025, the firm merged its operations with those of Accolade Wines, creating an entity called Vinarchy.

== Overview ==
It arose from the Australian and New Zealand companies formerly known as Premium Wine Brands and Pernod Ricard Pacific, and is then extended to become Pernod Ricard's umbrella organisation for its wine operations in other countries.

Amongst its large portfolio, its major wineries were Jacob's Creek from Australia, Campo Viejo from Spain, Kenwood Vineyards from the United States, and Brancott Estate from New Zealand.

== Corporate history ==
In 1989 Pernod Ricard purchased Orlando Wines and its Jacob's Creek label. A year later the Hunter Valley winery Wyndham Estate was purchased and the two merged to form the Orlando Wyndham Group the same year. Meanwhile, New Zealand's largest wine producer Montana Wines bought Corbans Wines in 2000, its next largest competition, and was then bought by Allied Domecq, which also owned Campo Viejo and Graffigna. Montana then became Pernod Ricard Pacific when Pernod Ricard took over Allied Domecq in 2005.

In 2010 Pernod Ricard launched its new wine division Premium Wine Brands, from its Australian and New Zealand operations. At the same time the New Zealand label Montana Wines was rebranded to Brancott Estate, and several of its brands inherited from Corbans Wines were sold off to Lion, including the Corbans label and Lindauer. In 2013 Premium Wine Brands changed its name to Pernod Ricard Winemakers, and purchased Helan Mountain, a winery in the Ningxia region of China. In 2014 Pernod Ricard purchased Kenwood Vineyards, and added it to its premium brand portfolio. In Australia, Wyndham Estate was closed and sold; it reopened in 2016 as Dalwood Estate, under new ownership.

== Brands ==
Pernod Ricard Winemakers produces wine in five major brands:

- Jacob's Creek (Barossa Valley, Australia)
- Kenwood Vineyards (Sonoma Valley, United States)
- Brancott Estate (New Zealand; predominantly Marlborough)
- Campo Viejo (Rioja DOC, Spain)

In addition, the company owns a large portfolio of other wineries. Notable examples are French Champagne makers Mumm and Perrier-Jouët, Stoneleigh and Church Road from New Zealand, Poet's Corner and St. Hugo from Australia, Bodegas Etchart from Argentina, Ysios from Spain, and Helan Mountain from China.

In January 2019, Pernod Ricard sold Argentine wine brand Graffina to Chilean winery VSPT. Ricard told The Drinks Business that the company would "continue to 'dispose' of brands that 'no longer fit' within the drinks giant's portfolio."
