= Orlando Wines =

Winery in South Australia

Coordinates: 34°34′48″S 138°55′42″E

Jacob's Creek
- Location: Rowland Flat, South Australia, Australia
- Wine region: Barossa Valley
- Formerly: Orlando Wines; G. Gramp and Sons
- Founded: 1847; 179 years ago
- First vintage: 1850; 176 years ago
- Parent company: Vinarchy
- Known for: Jacob's Creek, St Hugo
- Other attractions: Jacob's Creek Visitor's Centre
- Distribution: International
- Website: www.jacobscreek.com

Orlando Wines is an Australian wine company, well known for Jacob's Creek wine, first released in 1976. The company has been a wholly owned subsidiary of Pernod Ricard since 1989 and is now known as Pernod Ricard Winemakers. The winery still operates in the small township of Rowland Flat, between Lyndoch and Tanunda, in South Australia's Barossa Valley wine-growing region.

== History ==
In 1847 Bavarian immigrant Johann Gramp planted his first grape vines on the banks of the then recently named Jacob's Creek. The vines flourished and led to the production of their first vintage in 1850, making around 12 dozen bottles of hock style white wine from one small octave oak barrel. The winery now produces some of Australia's most successful export wines, with some 80% of sales being made in 50+ export markets and having the leading brand in the UK, New Zealand and Asia.

Orlando Wines was named Australian Exporter of the Year in 1993 and won the Maurice O'Shea Award in 1994. A modern visitor's centre and wine tasting cellar, known as the Jacob's Creek Visitor's Centre, was opened in 2002, at which time a time capsule was buried to be opened in 2027.

== Jacob's Creek ==
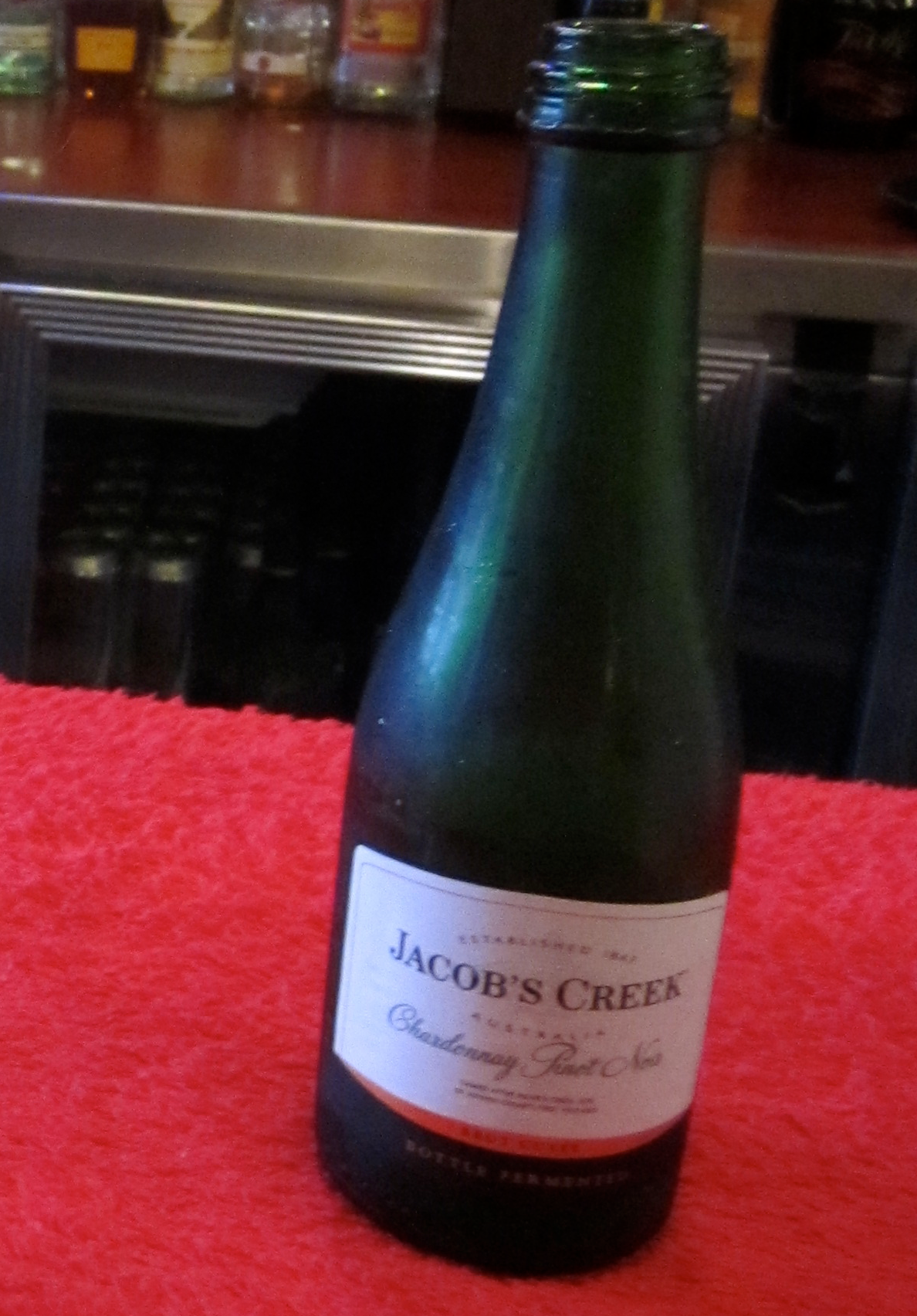
A bottle of Jacob's Creek Chardonnay Pinot Noir

Jacob's Creek is an Australian wine brand that is exported to over 60 countries. It is produced by Pernod Ricard in the small township of Rowland Flat in the Barossa Valley. In 1847, Johann Gramp, the founder of Orlando Wines, planted some of the first grape vines in the Barossa Valley along the banks of Jacob's Creek. Over a century later, in 1976, a 1973-vintage Shiraz Cabernet Malbec became the first wine to be released under the Jacob's Creek label.

=== Sponsorships ===
The brand has sponsored many events, including the Tour Down Under, but ended sponsorship in 2005 to return to traditional means of promotion, namely television and radio. However, naming rights have been retained for the Jacob's Creek Open Championship.

Jacob's Creek has also been a sponsor of the Australian Open tennis tournament since 2006. Since 2012, it has run television campaigns during the tournament featuring leading international tennis players sharing intimate anecdotes about their lives. The first of these campaigns, which ran from 2012 to 2014 was entitled 'Open Up' and featured Andre Agassi. The most recent campaign, entitled 'Made By Moments' commenced in 2015 and features Novak Djokovic.

A brand of wine produced by Jacob's Creek is "Cool Harvest", made by picking the grapes at the coolest period of the night to maximise the retention of tropical aromas and natural acidity. The cool harvest technique is used to produce a sparkling sauvignon blanc, as well as rosé, pinot grigio and a still sauvignon blanc.

== See also ==
- Australian wine
- Cult wine
- South Australian food and drink
- List of wineries in the Barossa Valley
