= Campo Viejo =

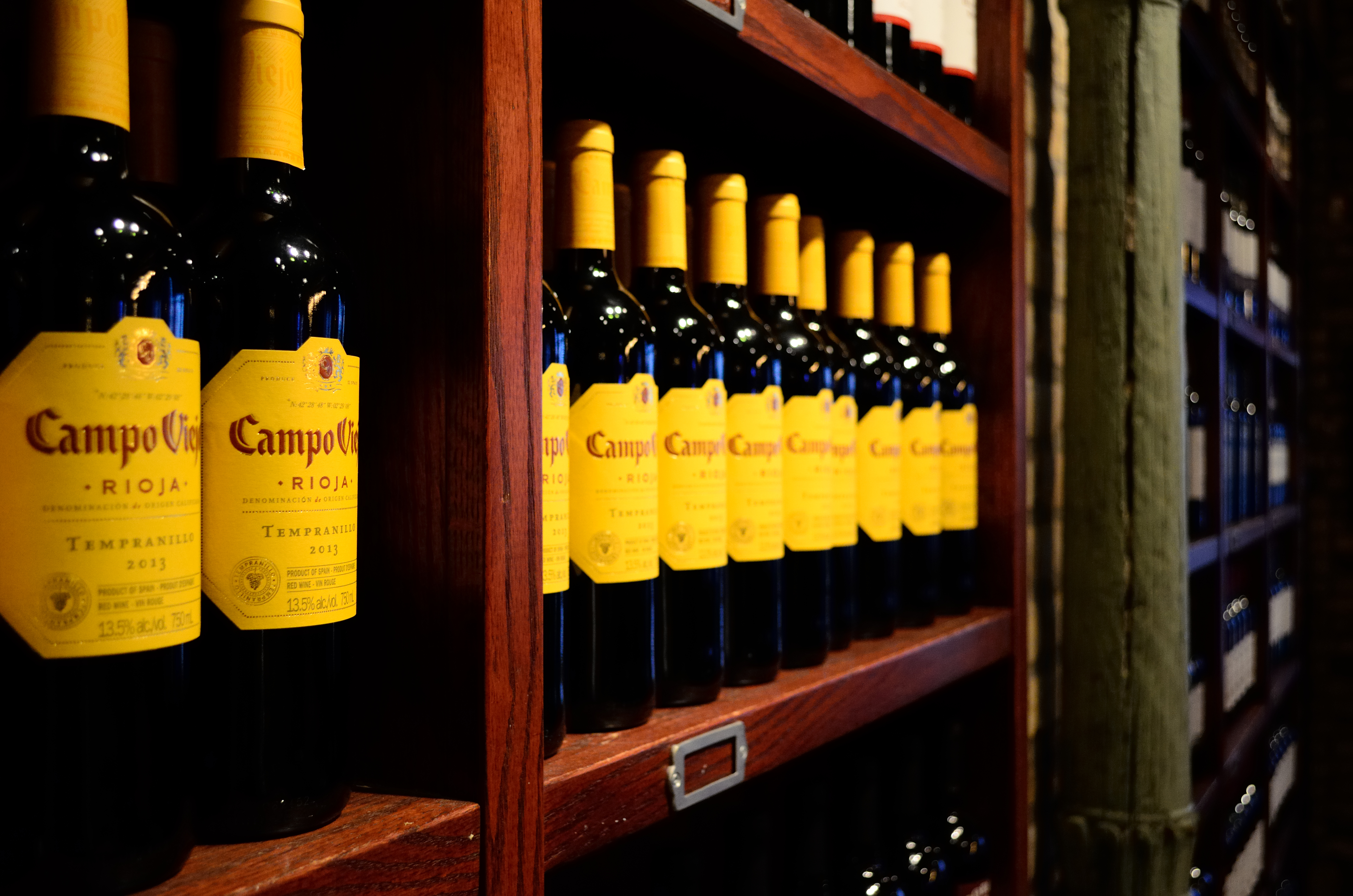
Campo Viejo bottles

Campo Viejo is a Spanish winery and Vinarchy brand producing red wine and traditional method sparkling wine (Cava) in the Rioja region of Spain. Founded in 1959, Campo Viejo grows Tempranillo, Garnacha, Graciano, Mazuelo, Viura, Tempranillo blanco and Verdejo.
