= Cullen Wines =

Winery in Western Australia

- Location: 4323 Caves Road, Wilyabrup WA 6280, Australia
- Coordinates: 33°49′09″S 115°02′15″E
- Wine region: Margaret River
- Founded: 1971
- First vines planted: 1966
- Key people: Vanya Cullen, managing director
- Known for: Diana Madeline Cabernet Merlot
- Varietals: Cabernet Franc, Cabernet Sauvignon, Chardonnay, Chenin blanc, Malbec, Merlot, Petit Verdot, Pinot noir, Riesling, Sauvignon blanc, Semillon, Shiraz
- Distribution: International
- Tasting: Open to public
- Website: Cullen Wines

Cullen Wines is an Australian winery based in Wilyabrup, within the Margaret River wine region of Western Australia.

== History ==
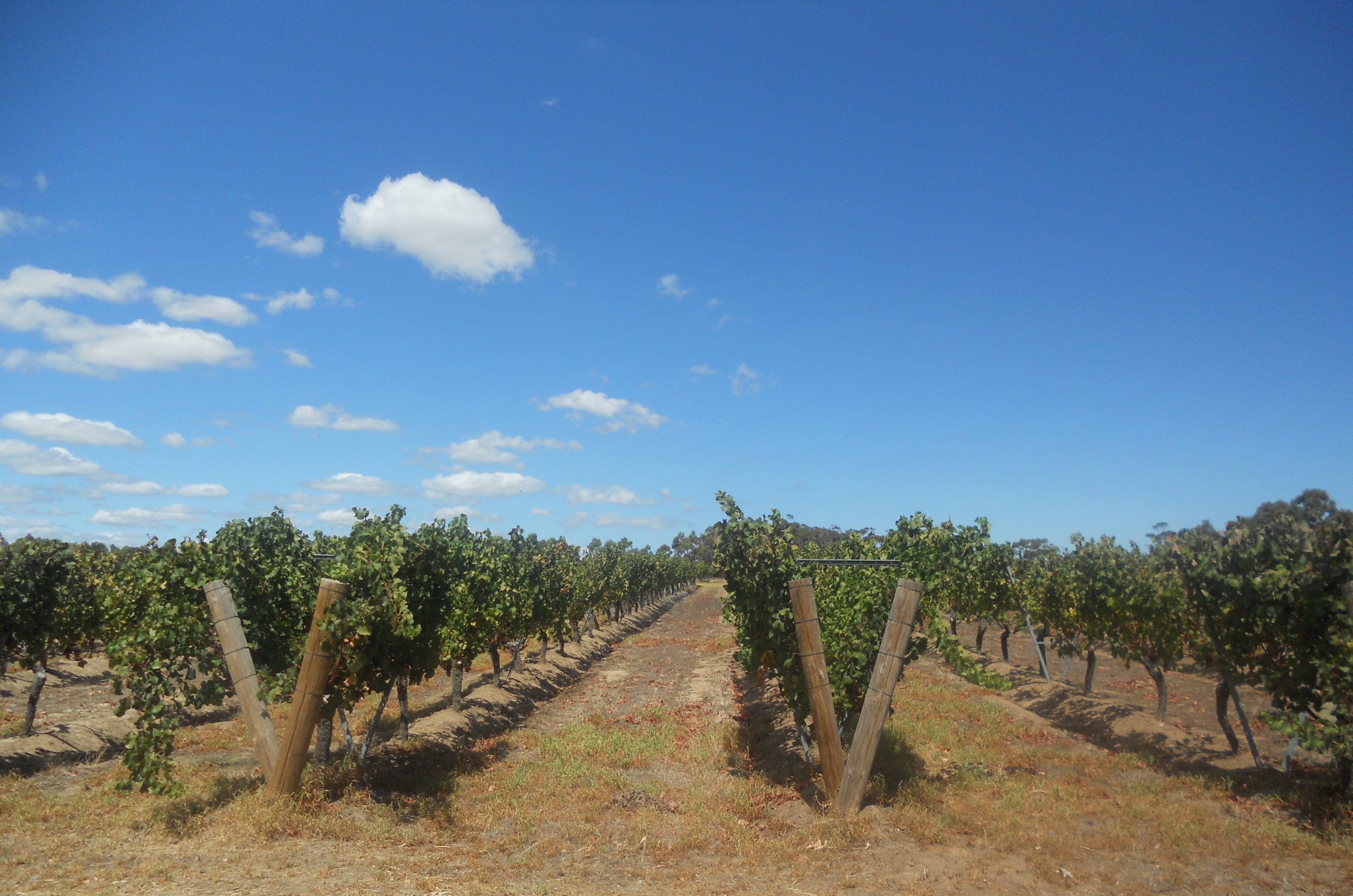
Cullen Winery semillon grapevines

Trial vines were planted on one acre of land by Diana and Kevin Cullen on a Wilyabrup property in 1966 after having read advice and received encouragement from Dr John Gladstones, who believed the Margaret River was ideal for planting vines due to a similarity he saw with the climate and soils of Bordeaux. The trials were promising, and 17 acres of vineyards were planted, this time on their own property, in 1971, with the business founded under the name "Wilyabrup Wines". The first grape vines planted were Cabernet Sauvignon, Riesling and Gewürztraminer.

Kevin Cullen was given the Western Australian "Citizen of the year" for "The Professions" in 1993, and was inducted as a Member of the Order of Australia in 1994 for "service to medicine" and service "to the wine industry". He died in 1994.

Diana Cullen was inducted as a Member of the Order of Australia in 2000 for "service to the development of viticulture and the wine industry". She died in 2003.

Vanya Cullen, the daughter of Diana and Kevin, took over the wine making role in 1989 after graduating from Roseworthy College with an Oenology degree in 1986, and is the current managing director and senior winemaker. Prior to undertaking the Oenology degree, in 1982 she graduated from the University of Western Australia with a degree in zoology.

Vanya Cullen received the "Australian Winemaker of the Year" award from Gourmet Traveller Wine magazine in 2000 and was voted "Woman of the Year" by UK based wine magazine The Drinks Business in 2008, becoming the first Australian to receive the award. She was awarded the Medal of the Order of Australia in 2023 for "service to viticulture and oenology".

Cullen Wines has been run according to biodynamic farming principles since 2003, after having adopted organic methods in 1998. Cullen Wines was the first winery in Australia to be certified carbon neutral, starting the process in 2006. Vanya Cullen is on the board of the "Days of Change" program, which aims to help Western Australian people and businesses live and operate in a more sustainable way.

== Wines ==
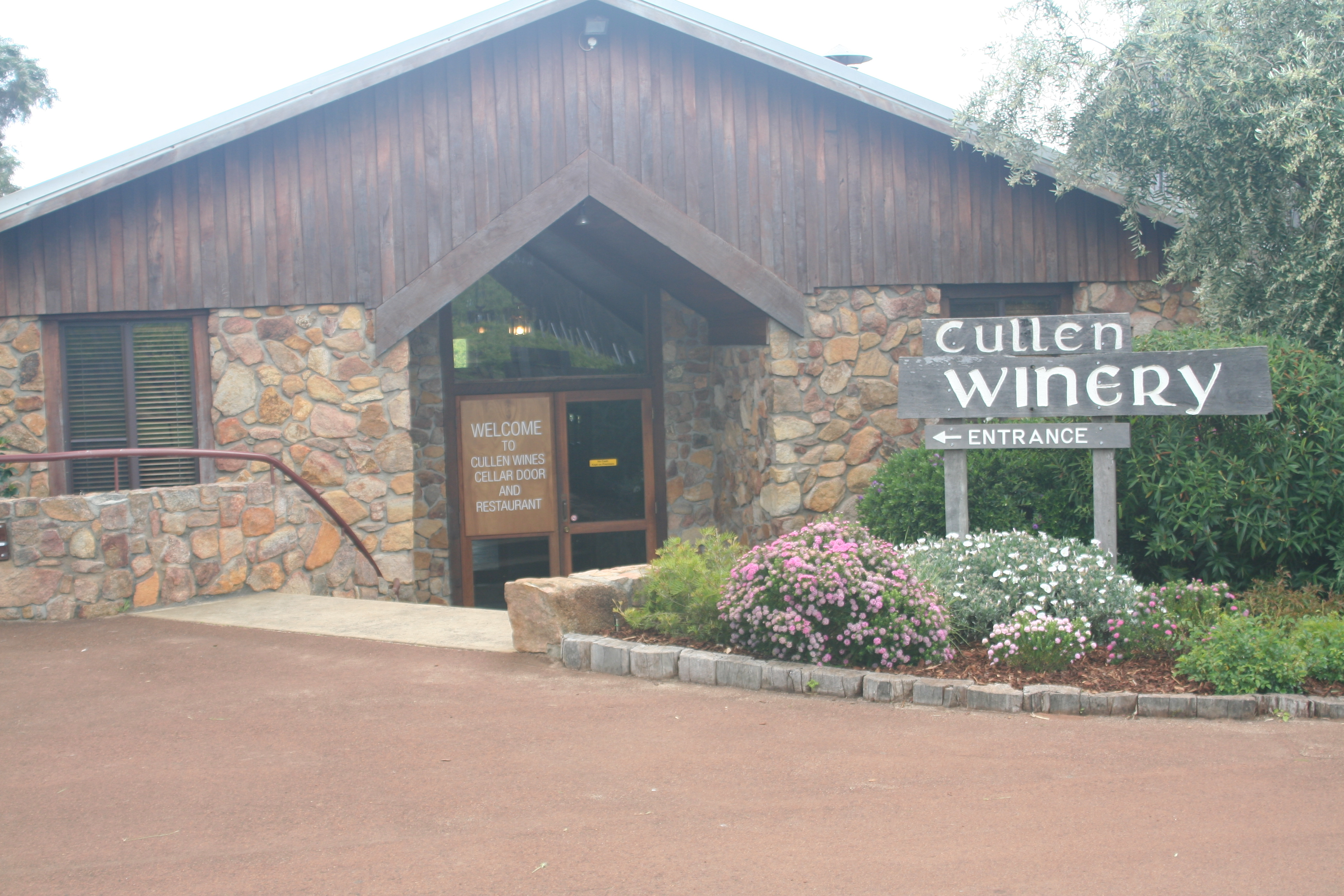
Cullen Winery cellar door

About 20,000 cases of wine are produced each vintage from the 45 hectares of vineyards owned by the winery.

The best known wine produced by Cullen Wines is the "Diana Madeline Cabernet Merlot", It is made of around 60% Cabernet Sauvignon, 30% Merlot and 10% Cabernet Franc in most vintages. Langton's Classification of Australian Wine placed this wine at their highest level of "Exceptional" in the 2005 classification, and it stayed at this level for the subsequent classification in 2010. It is named in tribute of Diana Cullen, the co-founder of the estate.

From the 2006 vintage, a "Kevin John Chardonnay" has been produced, which is named as a tribute for the other founder of the estate, Kevin Cullen.

Other red wines produced include a single vineyard Malbec, Petit Verdot and Merlot blend called Mangan East Block, a Pinot noir and a Cabernet Sauvignon and Merlot blend called Margaret River Red.

A number of other white wines are also produced, including two single-vineyard Sauvignon blanc–Semillon blends from the Cullen and Mangan vineyards and a Margaret River White which contains Sauvignon blanc, Semillon and a small amount of Chardonnay.

== See also ==
- Australian wine
- List of wineries in Western Australia
- Western Australian wine
