= Margaret River (wine region) =

Wine region in Western Australia

Coordinates: 33°57′18″S 115°04′30″E

- Wine region
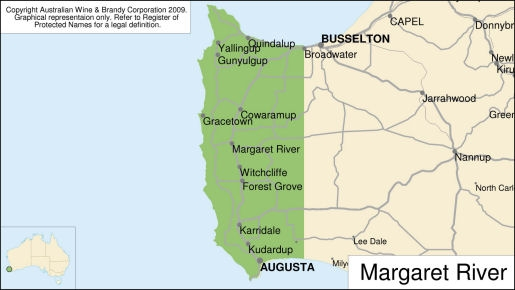
- Margaret River Wine Region
- Country: Australia
- Part of: Western Australia
- Climate region: Mediterranean with strong maritime influences
- Soil conditions: Whilst the unique Forest Grove ironstone soils are some of the most acclaimed, the region’s diversity of soil types offer optimal conditions for a myriad of grape varieties, styles and wine complexity.
- Total area: 213,000 hectares (2,130 km^{2})
- Size of planted vineyards: 5,840 hectares (14,431 acres)
- No. of vineyards: 215
- Varietals produced: Sauvignon blanc, Sémillon, Chardonnay, Cabernet Sauvignon, Shiraz, Tempranillo, Petit Verdot, Merlot, Cabernet Franc, Malbec, Chenin Blanc, Riesling
- No. of wineries: 187

Margaret River is the major geographical indication wine region in southwest Western Australia, with 5,840 hectares under vine and 215 wineries as at 2012. Margaret River wine region is made up predominantly of boutique size wine producers; although winery operations range from the smallest crushing 3.5 tonne per year to the largest around 2,500 tonne. The climate of Margaret River is more strongly maritime-influenced than any other major Australian region. It has the lowest mean annual temperature range, of only 7.6 °C, and as well as the most marked Mediterranean climate in terms of rainfall, with only 200 millimetres of the annual 1160 millimetres falling between October and April. The low diurnal and seasonal temperature range means an unusually even accumulation of warmth. Overall the climate is similar to that of Bordeaux in a dry vintage. Although the region produces just two percent of total Australian wine grape production, it produces over 20 percent of Australia's premium wine market. The principal grape varieties are split 40/60 between red and white; Cabernet Sauvignon, Chardonnay, Sauvignon blanc, Sémillon, Shiraz, Merlot and Chenin Blanc.

== Sub-regions ==
There are no official Margaret River subregions, although in 1999 viticultural scientist Dr John Gladstones presented a paper suggesting there should be six subregions based on climate and soil differences namely: Yallingup, Carbunup, Wilyabrup, Treeton, Wallcliffe and Karridale.

== Most widely harvested varieties by tonnes crushed ==
Vintage 2021
Sauvignon blanc	6,886
Cabernet Sauvignon	6,414
Chardonnay	5,371
Sémillon	5,284
Shiraz	3,739
Merlot	1,180
Chenin Blanc	871

== Wineries ==
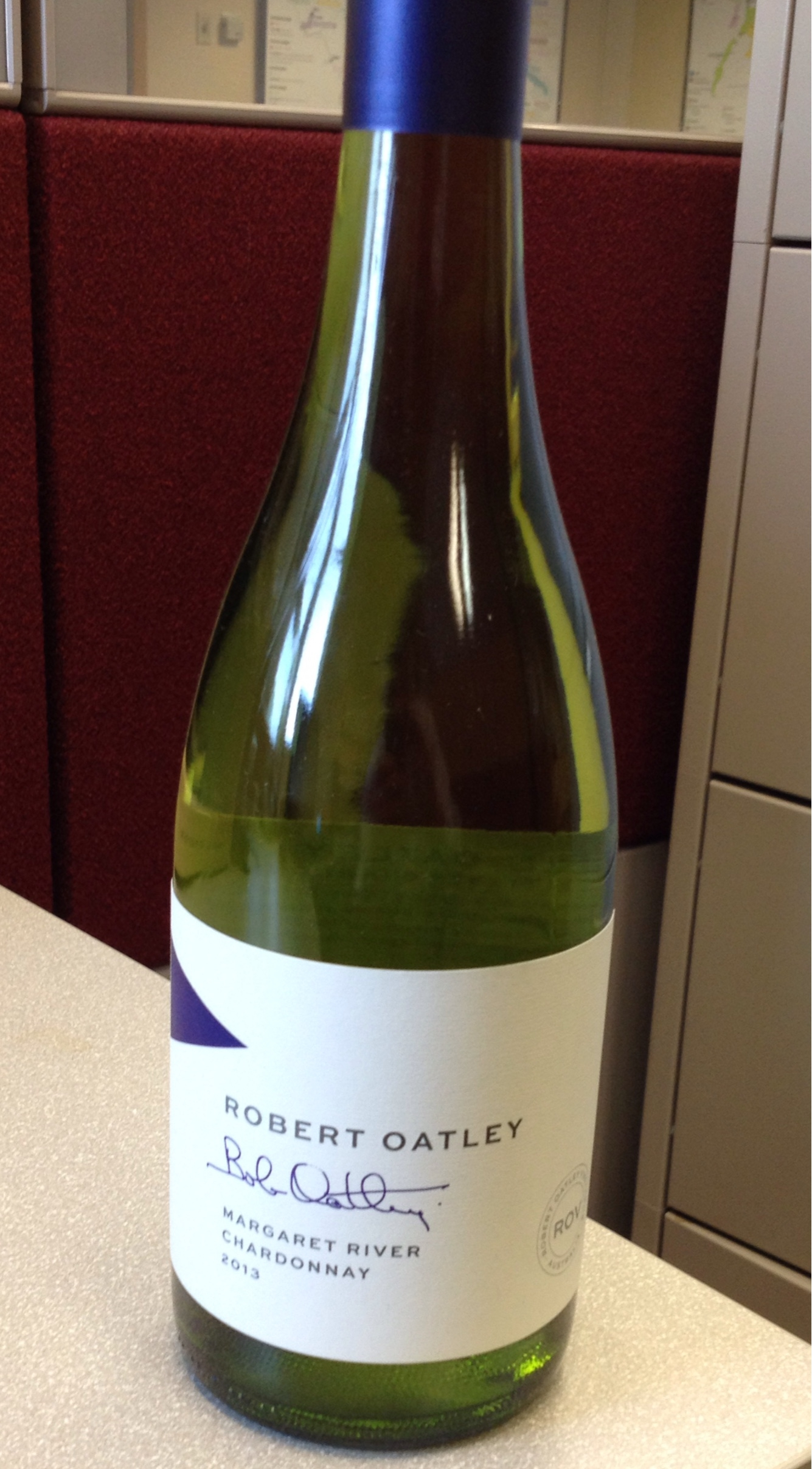
Robert Oatley Chardonnay

A sample of the wine producers in the Margaret River Wine Region include:

- Aravina Estate
- Ashbrook Estate
- Brookland Valley Estate
- Cape Mentelle
- Brookland Valley
- Cullen Wines
- Devil's Lair
- Driftwood Estate
- Fermoy Estate
- Gralyn Estate
- Hay Shed Hill Wines
- Howard Park, MadFish, and Marchand & Burch Wines
- Leeuwin Estate
- Lenton Brae Estate
- Moss Wood
- Pierro
- Robert Oatley
- Sandalford Wines
- Stella Bella Wines
- Vasse Felix
- Voyager Estate
- Woodlands Wines

== See also ==
- Western Australian wine
