= Luke Mangan =

Australian chef and restaurateur (born 1970)

Luke William Mangan OAM (born 6 May 1970) is an Australian chef and restaurateur.

Mangan owns and operates restaurants in Sydney, Australia. He also partnered with Mater Private Hospital Brisbane to bring healthy, quality restaurant food to hospitals. Mangan is the co-founder of The Inspired Series and Australia’s Appetite for Excellence, a hospitality awards program for young chefs, waiters and restaurateurs in Australia.

== Early career ==
Mangan grew up in a family of seven boys in Melbourne. His culinary career began under the guide of Hermann Schneider at his Melbourne-based Two Faces restaurant. Following his training, Mangan persuaded Michel Roux at the 3 Michelin Star Waterside Inn London to take him on. Mangan moved to Sydney in 1994 to open John Hemmes’ CBD restaurant in CBD hotel, at age 24.

== Restaurants ==
Mangan opened Salt with former business partner Lucy Allon in 1999, aged 29.

In 2005, Mangan sold 50% of the Salt brand to Port Japan Partners and opened Salt in Tokyo in 2005. The enterprise has grown to include Salt grill & Sky bar and Salt tapas & bar, Singapore; Salt, the adjoining World Wine Bar and Salt grill & tapas bar, Tokyo.

In August 2018, Mangan sold his remaining shares in the Asia Salt brand. The restaurants continue to operate without Mangan's involvement.

Having launched the Chicken Confidential fast food brand in 2017, as well as Luke’s Kitchen in Sydney’s Waterloo early 2018, the chef now plans to focus on rolling out a range of spin-off ventures under his first name, such as Luke’s Burger Bar, Luke’s Cafe, Luke’s Fish House, Luke’s Steak House and Luke’s Wine Bar, as well as maintaining his land, sea and air consultancies. For many years, Mangan operated Salt grill, Luke's and A Taste of Salt on board five P&O cruise ships, until the retirement of P&O Cruises Australia brand in 2025. His other venues did include Virgin Australia Business Class, the organic chicken burger restaurant at Chifley Plaza in Sydney CBD and Sydney International Airport, Coast Café + Bar and Bridge Bar, Sydney International Airport, Luke's Kitchen and glass brasserie at Hilton Hotel Sydney.

Mangan operated Sydney CBD-based glass brasserie from 2004 to 2024, which underwent a $6 million makeover in 2005 with New York architect Tony Chi heading interiors. In February 2018, glass underwent a $1.6 million kitchen refurbishment.

In June 2024, Carnival Corporation announced P&O Cruises Australia would be retired in March 2025, with its two remaining ships, transitioning into the Carnival Cruise Line fleet as Carnival Adventure and Carnival Encounter. Despite the rebranding, Mangan's signature venues, including Luke's Bar & Grill and Luke's Burgers, continue to operate onboard both ships under the new Carnival branding.

Mangan's current venues include Luke's Kitchen in The Kimpton Margot Hotel, in the CBD. Luke's Bistro & Bar in Qantas Domestic Terminal, Luke's Table in the Pylon, Sydney Harbour Bridge and Luke's Table Afloat.

== Books ==
Luke Mangan has published five books.

== Providores range ==
In 2009, Mangan launched Luke Mangan Providores, a line of gourmet products that showcases the best Australian ingredients. The products includes spices like BBQ, Cajun, Dukkah, Za'atar, Curry and Moroccan, Extra Virgin Olive Oil and infusions like Garlic, Lemon, Lemon Myrtle and Truffle and Vinegars including Balsamic, White and red wine vinegar. The range also includes mustards, relishes, pastes, sauces and chocolate-coated nuts.

== Virgin Australia ==
Mangan took a consultancy role for Virgin Atlantic, and went on to become the Virgin Australia Business Class consulting chef, providing guests with meals during their international and domestic Virgin Australia flights.

== Charity and industry work ==
Mangan supports Camp Quality, Newman’s Own Foundation, Cure The Future, Breast Cancer Network Australia, FSHD Global Research Foundation, and Australia's Biggest Morning Tea. In 2005, Mangan co-founded the Appetite for Excellence Awards program, which supports aspiring chefs, waiters and restaurateurs in Australia.
