= Viña Tarapacá =

- Location: Isla de Maipo, Chile
- Appellation: Maipo Valley
- Formerly: Viña de Rojas (1874-1892); Viña Zavala (1892-1927)
- Founded: 1874 (150–151 years ago)
- Key people: Founder: Francisco de Rojas y Salamanca
- Parent company: VSPT Wine Group (2008-act.)
- Acres cultivated: 1510
- Cases/yr: 98,000
- Website: tarapaca.cl; vsptwinegroup.com

Viña Tarapacá, formerly called Viña de Rojas y Viña Zavala, is a Chilean vineyard and winery, founded in Isla de Maipo by Francisco de Rojas y Salamanca, in 1874. Since 2008, the winery has been part of the group called Viña San Pedro-Taparacá S.A., or VSPT Wine Group, a company that has a total of 4,254 hectares of cultivated vines, producing more than 16 million cases of wine per year, which its members sell in more than 80 markets on the all continents, constituting the second largest wine exporting conglomerate in Chile, and one of the 15 largest wine companies in the world. About this, Viña Tarapacá contributes with 611 hectares, and a production of 98,000 cases of wine per year, distributed in 50 countries.

== Awards and honours ==
National:

- Silver medal, at the International Exhibition of Santiago in 1875.
- Vineyard of the year, as VSPT Wine Group, in 2014, according to Association Wines of Chile.

International:

- Silver medal, in the Universal Exhibition of Philadelphia in 1876.
- Green Company of the Year, in 2016, and 2nd place in 2014, awarded by Drinks Business Green Awards to VSPT Wine Group.
- Ethical Company of the Year, in 2014 as VSPT Wine Group, according to Drinks Business Green Awards.
- 2nd place in the Water Management category, in 2017, according to the Drinks Business Green Awards to VSPT Wine Group.
- Fair trade certification Fair for Life, from Ecocert, valid from 2020 to VSPT Wine Group.
