= Wilyabrup, Western Australia =

Locality in Western Australia

Wilyabrup
- Town
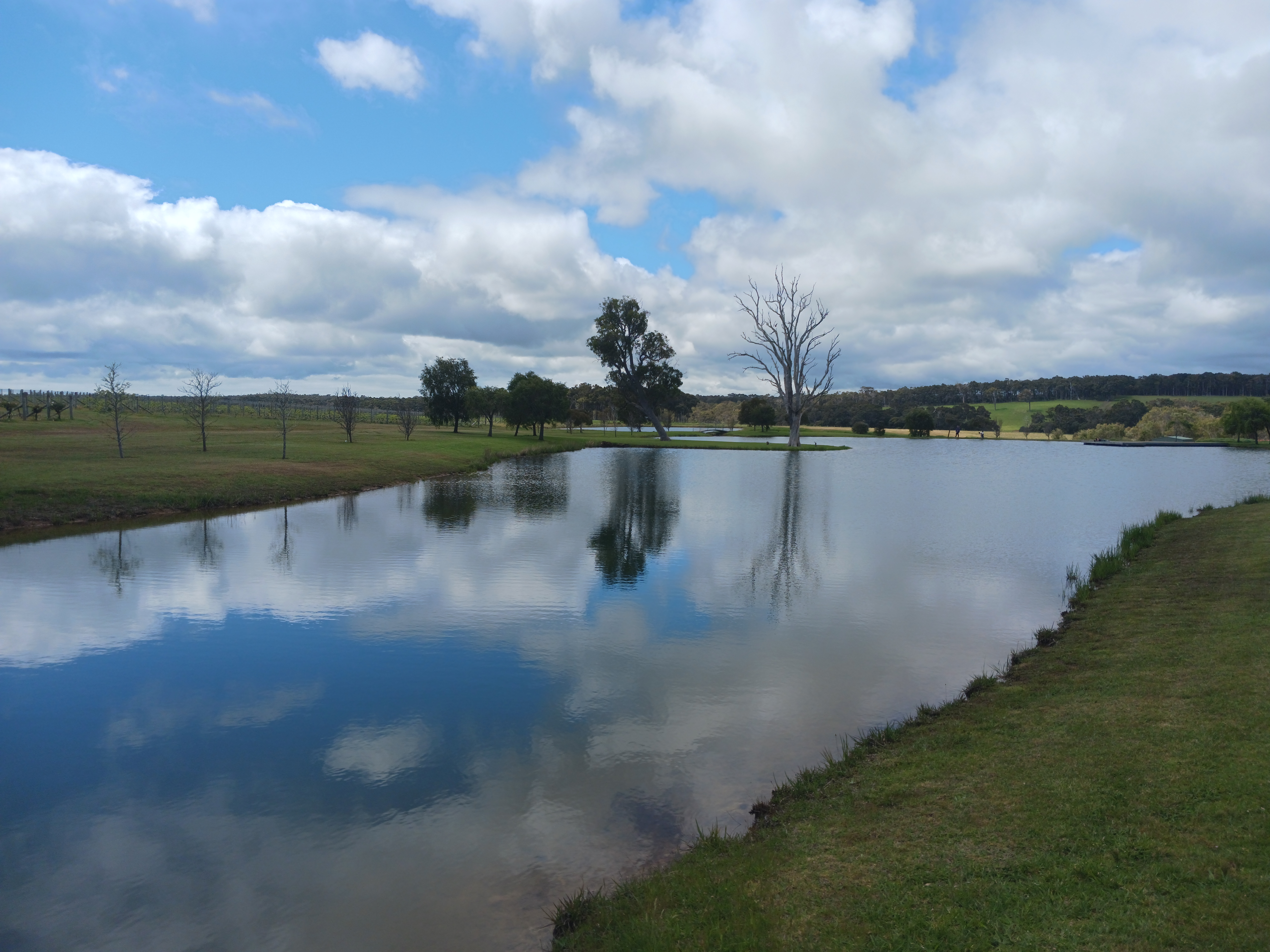
- Rural landscape in Wilyabrup, seen from a local brewery

- Coordinates: 33°47′S 115°2′E
- Country: Australia
- State: Western Australia
- LGA(s): City of Busselton
- Location: 260 km (160 mi) from Perth; 39 km (24 mi) from Busselton; 25 km (16 mi) from Margaret River
- Established: 1987

Government
  - State electorate(s): Vasse
  - Federal division(s): Forrest

Area
  - Total: 81.7 km^{2} (31.5 sq mi)

Population
  - Total(s): 193 (SAL 2021)
- Time zone: UTC+8 (AWST)
- Postcode: 6280

Wilyabrup, also spelt Willyabrup, is a locality in Western Australia's Margaret River wine region, in the local government area of the City of Busselton. The Quinninup Falls are within the locality.

At the 2021 census, it had a population of 193. It has the highest concentration of premium wine producers in the region.

== History ==
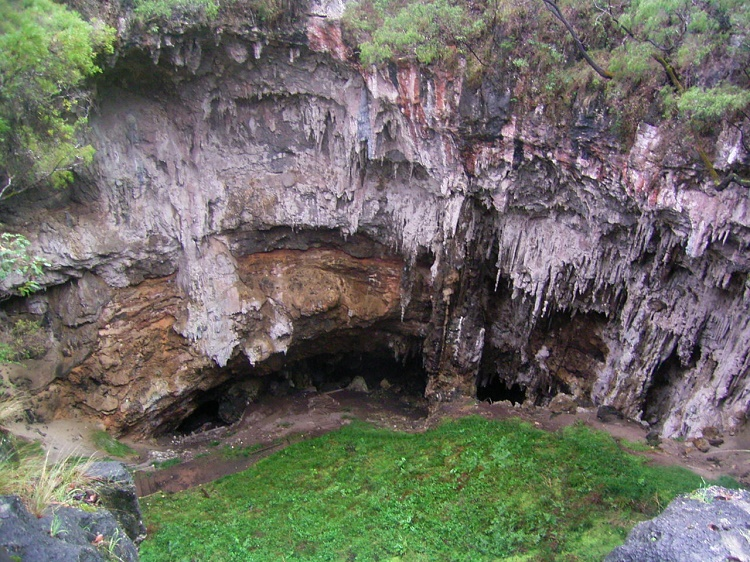
A cave in Wilyabrup

The area lies in the traditional lands of the Wadandi people.

The name "Wilyabrup" (also spelt "Willyabrup") comes from the local Wilyabrup Brook, which first appeared on planning documents in 1865, and may be derived from "Worlyabaraap", a Noongar word meaning "northern sky".

The area was developed in the 1920s as part of the Group Settlement Scheme, with the construction of a hall beginning in 1922 and a school on the site in 1928; the school was destroyed by fire in 1954.

Wine began to be grown there in the 1960s and 1970s, with Vasse Felix and Cullen Wines being the first vineyards in Wilyabrup.

The area was gazetted as a bounded locality in 1987, having previously been a postal district.

== Attractions ==
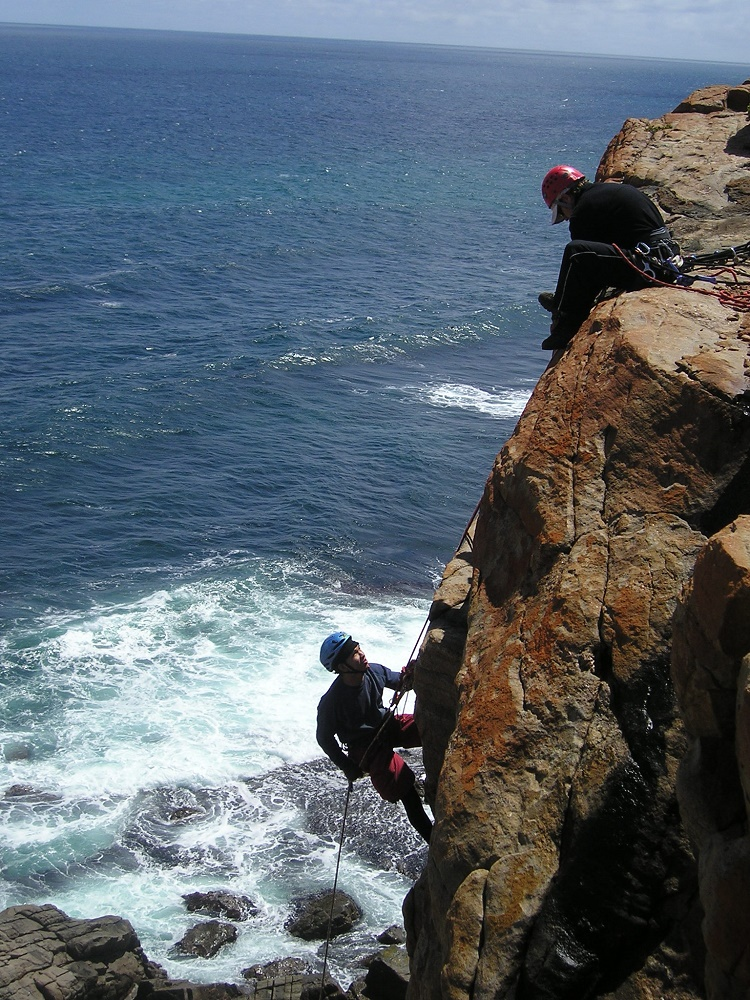
Abseiling on the sea cliffs

Within the locality are the Wilyabrup Sea Cliffs, which are used for rock-climbing and abseiling, along with Quinninup Falls, which are on the Cape to Cape Track.

Near the Falls, there was evidence of Noongars having inhabited the area around 17,000 years ago in the form of fire pits, which have now been removed. The area is still regarded by the Wadandi people as culturally significant, having been an important ceremonial site. With the increasing popularity among tourists during the COVID-19 pandemic in Australia in mid-2021, the traditional custodians and the Department of Biodiversity, Conservation and Attractions have been collaborating to improve signs requesting walkers to keep to the paths, and revegetation efforts are under way as of 2021.
