= New World wine =

Wine produced outside the traditional wine-growing areas of Europe and the Middle East

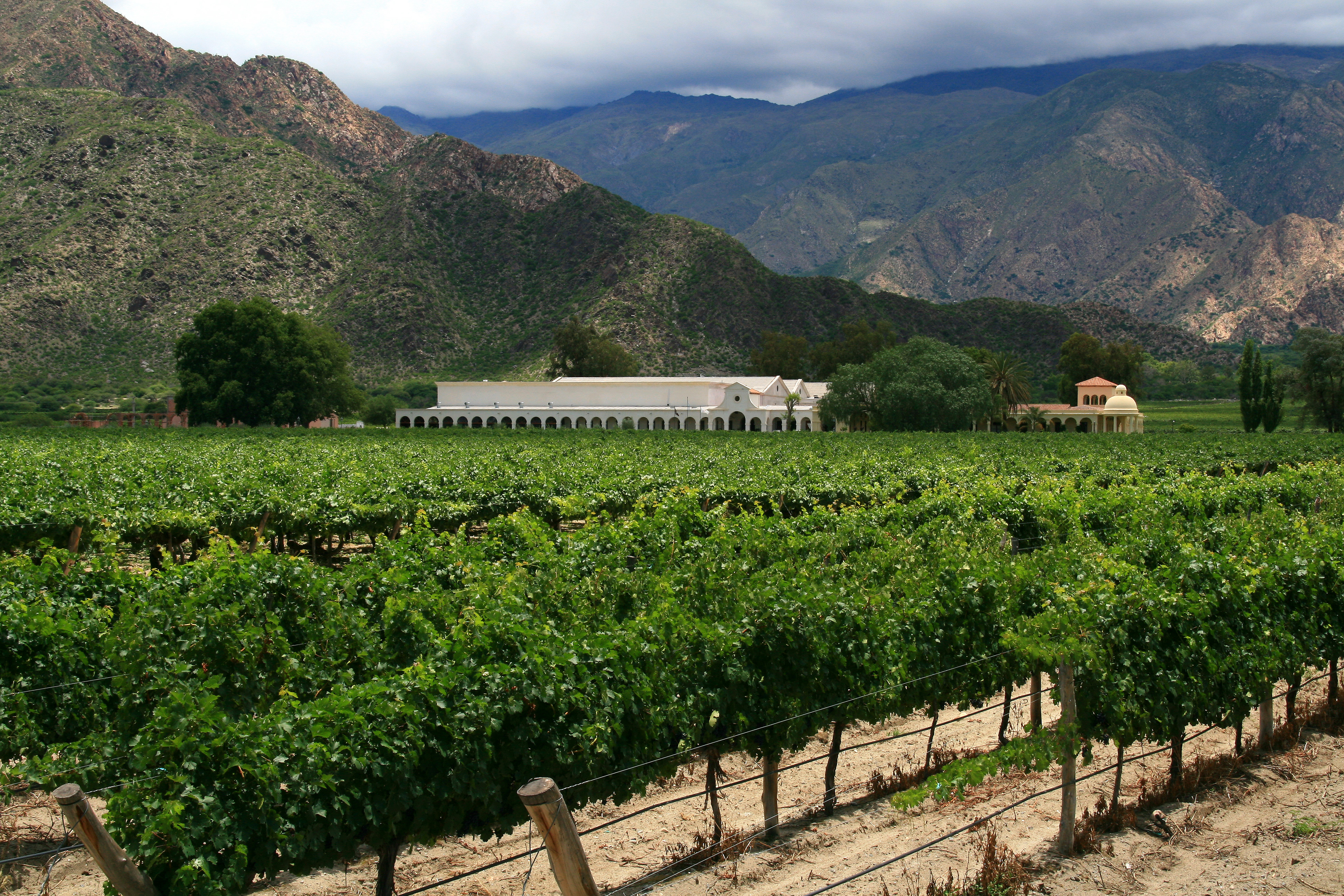
Vineyard in Cafayate, Argentina

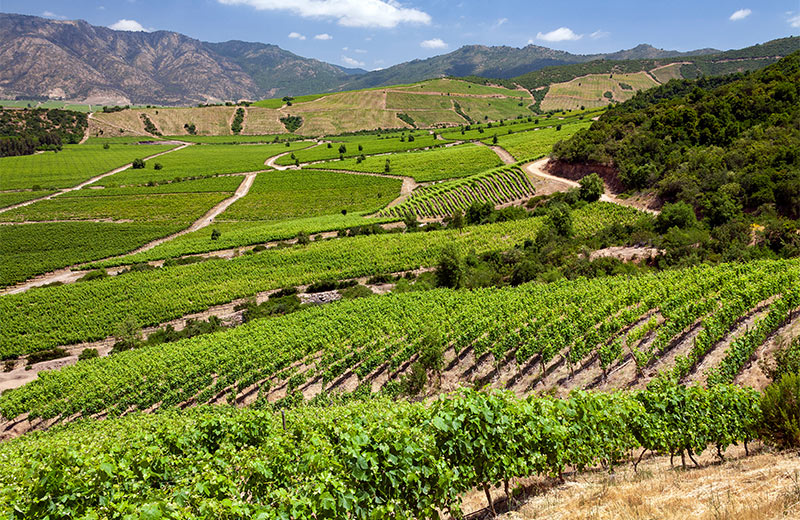
Vineyard in Santa Cruz, Chile

New World wines are those wines produced outside the traditional winegrowing areas of Europe and the Middle East, in particular from Argentina, Australia, Brazil, Canada, Chile, Japan (primarily Yamanashi), Mexico, New Zealand, South Africa and the United States (primarily California). The phrase connotes a distinction between these "New World" wines and those wines produced in "Old World" countries with a long-established history of wine production, essentially in Europe and the Middle East, most notably: France, Italy, Spain, Portugal, Germany, Romania, Georgia, and Switzerland.

Both the quantity and quality of New World wine production has increased greatly since about 1970.

Outside their home markets, New World wines can be said to have been very successful in exports to non-wine producing countries, above all the United Kingdom, and also to North America. But they have achieved relatively little penetration in old wine-making countries such as France and Italy.

== History ==
=== Early wines in the Americas ===
Alcoholic beverages were made by Pre-Columbian indigenous peoples of the Americas. Indigenous peoples are known to have used maize, potatoes, quinoa, pepper tree fruits and strawberries to make alcoholic beverages. Despite the existence of species of the genus Vitis (to which Vitis vinifera belongs) in Venezuela, Colombia, Central America and Mexico, indigenous peoples did not ferment these species and therefore did not make wine.

Spanish settlers in the Americas initially brought Old World animals and plants to the Americas for self-consumption in their attempt to reproduce the diet they had in Spain and Europe. A further stimulus for the production of New World wine in Spanish America might have been that European wines exported to the Americas were in general not transported in bottles nor sealed with cork which made them prone to be sour.

Attempts to grow vines in the Americas began in Hispaniola during the second voyage of Columbus in 1494. Ferdinand II of Aragon, King of Spain, banned the planting of vines in Hispaniola in 1503. After the establishment of vines in Hispaniola in early 16th century vineyards were successfully established in Mexico in 1524. Hernán Cortés, conqueror of Mexico, promoted the establishment of vines and made it in 1524 a requirement for Spanish settlers that wanted to acquire land in the Mexican Plateau to establish vineyards in their lands. The growing of vines in Peru is known to have been ventured by Bartolomé de Terrazas and Francisco de Carabantes in the 1540s. The latter established vineyards in Ica from where vines then were taken into Chile and Argentina.

The most common of the early grapes was a black grape called Mission (Spanish: Misión) which was planted in Mexico and subsequently also in Texas, and later in California. Grapes of the same stock were planted in Peru where it received the name Negra peruana (Peruvian black) and from this came the most common Chilean grape: the País. This Chilean grape was introduced into what is now Argentina where it came to be known as Criolla chica. These grapes are supposed to have originated from Spain but there is also a possibility that they originated from Italy as they resemble very much the variety Mónica grown in Sardinia as well as Spain.

In the second half of the 16th century, the demand for wine among Spanish settlers caused a surge in Spanish wine exports to Mexico and Cuba. However, this was not the case for Peru, Chile, and Argentina, where cultivation of vineyards had proven to be a success and, thus, required fewer imports of Spanish wines. Relative to Peru and Chile, Spanish settlers in Mexico established very few vineyards by comparison.

In the 16th and 17th century the principal winegrowing area of the Americas was in the central and southern coast of Peru, specifically in the area of Ica and Pisco. Apart from Peru and Chile Paraguay developed despite its high temperatures into a wine-making area in the 16th century. Hernando Arias de Saavedra who visited the city of Asunción in 1602 said there was 187 vineyards totalling 1.768.000 individual plants. Other sources cite 2.000.000 and 1.778.000 plants around the same time. Paraguayan wine was exported downstream to Santa Fe and from there to the Platine market. Paraguayan wine is also known to have reached Córdoba in central Argentina.

=== Changes in the Americas and opening of South Africa ===
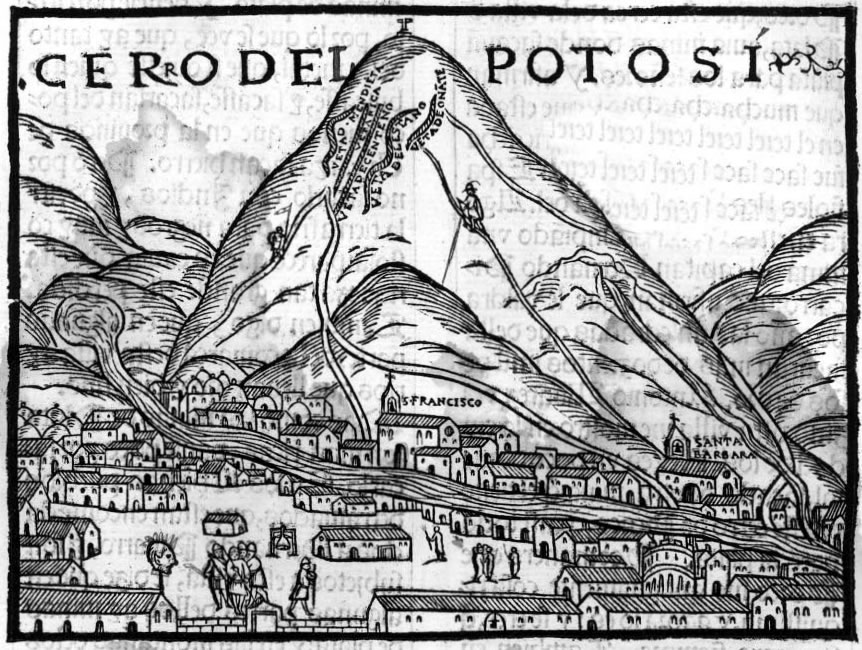
Mining activity in Potosí created a huge demand for wine in 17th century South America. Drawing by Pedro Cieza de León from 1553.

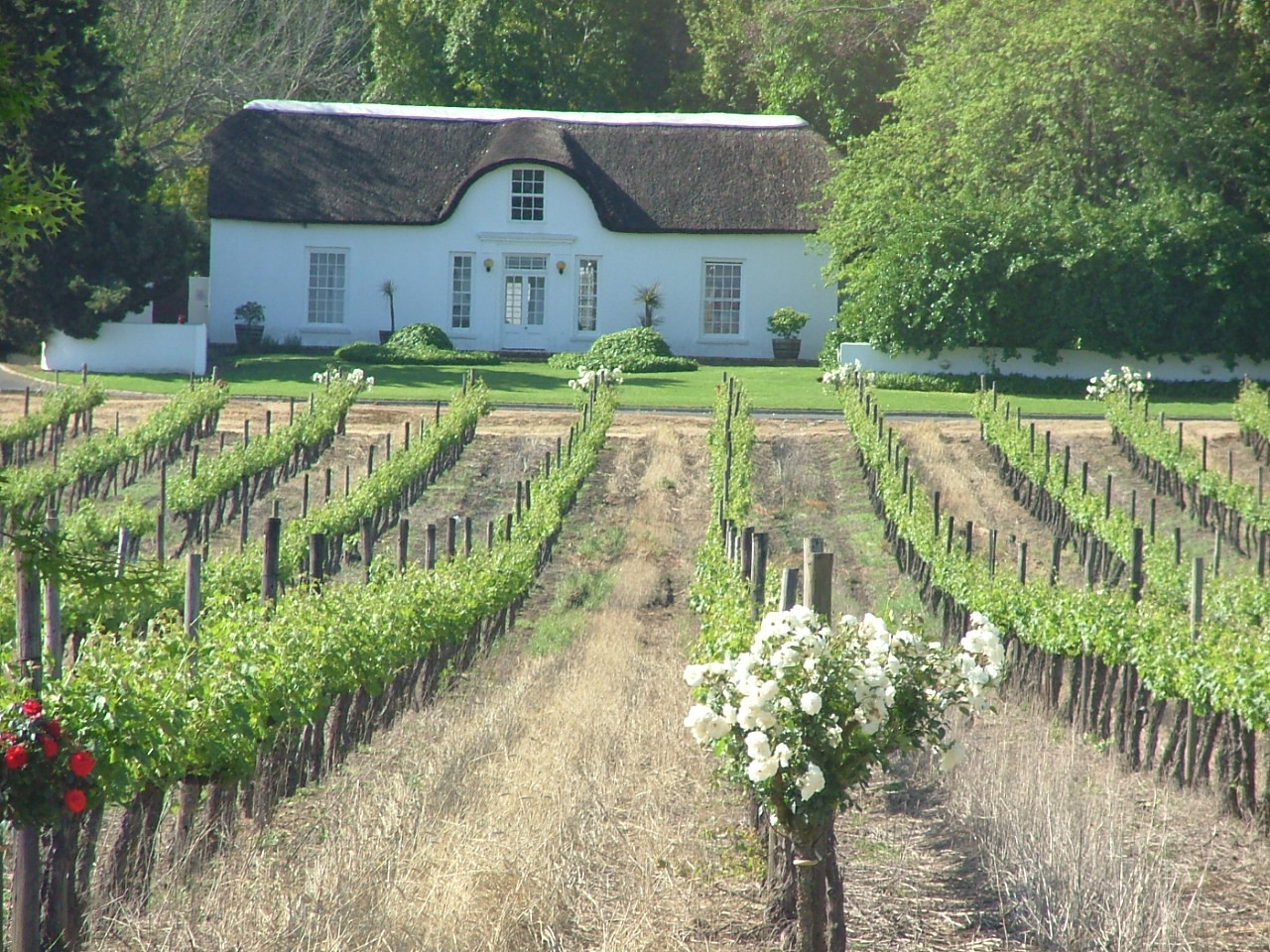
Vineyard in Stellenbosch, South Africa

In 1595 the Spanish Crown banned the establishment of new vineyards in the Americas, but this order was largely ignored. The ban sought to protect Iberian wine from competition by Peruvian wine and can be considered an example of commodity mercantilism. Moreover, the Spanish Crown banned the export of Peruvian wine to Panama and Guatemala in 1614 and 1615 respectively. The enforcement of the restrictions on wine growth and trade in the Spanish Empire was in general lax. The only market in the Americas the Spanish Crown managed – to some degree – to secure for Iberian wine was Mexico.

The growth of mining in Potosí in present-day Bolivia, which became the largest city in the Americas in the 17th century, created a constant demand for wine which was supplied mainly from Peru. In Potosí part of salaries were paid with wine. Furthermore, Peruvian wine growers supplied the city of Lima, the most important political centre in South America in the 16th and 17th centuries. In Chile wine demand was guaranteed by the Army of Arauco, a permanent army financed with silver from Potosí which fought native Mapuches. In the view that Paraguayan wine could not compete in these three markets Paraguayans abandoned winegrowing and sought instead income from tobacco and yerba mate exports. In the 18th century practically no winegrowing occurred in Paraguay.

In 1687 the whole southern coast of Peru was struck by the 1687 Peru earthquake which destroyed the cities of Villa de Pisco and Ica. The earthquake destroyed wine cellars and mud containers used for wine storage. This event marked the end of the Peruvian wine-boom. The suppression of the Society of Jesus in Spanish America in 1767 caused the Jesuit vineyards in Peru to be auctioned at high prices but new owners did not have the same expertise as the Jesuits contributing to a production decline. Peruvian wine-making was further challenged by the fact that production of pisco, also made from grapes, rose from being exceeded in the early 18th century by wine to represent 90% of the grape beverages prepared in Peru in 1764. Even after the shift to pisco making vineyards in Peru encountered economic troubles since in the late 18th century the Spanish Crown lifted the ban on the production of rum in Peru which was cheaper to make but of lower quality than pisco.

The decline of Peruvian wine even caused Peru to import some wine from Chile as it happened in 1795 when Lima imported 5.000 troves (Spanish: botijas) from Concepción in southern Chile. This particular export showed the emergence of Chile relative to Peru as a wine-making region. Eduard Friedrich Poeppig claimed, as some others did before him, that the wines from Concepción were the best of Chile, likely due to the less arid climate of southern Chile.

The New World imported wine from the early days of European colonisation, particularly for religious purposes. Perhaps the first significant example of the trade going the other way was Constantia from South Africa, which by the 18th century had become a firm favourite among European royalty.

=== New World wines in the Industrial Age ===
Vine cuttings from the Cape of Good Hope were brought to the penal colony of New South Wales by Governor Phillip on the First Fleet (1788). An attempt at wine making from these first vines failed, but with perseverance, other settlers managed to successfully cultivate vines for winemaking, and Australian-made wine was available for sale domestically by the 1820s. In 1822 Gregory Blaxland became the first person to export Australian wine, and was the first winemaker to win an overseas award. In 1830 vineyards were established in the Hunter Valley. In 1833 James Busby returned from France and Spain with a serious selection of grape varieties including most classic French grapes and a good selection of grapes for fortified wine production.

Early Australian winemakers faced many difficulties, particularly due to the unfamiliar Australian climate. However they eventually achieved considerable success. "At the 1873 Vienna Exhibition the French judges, tasting blind, praised some wines from Victoria, but withdrew in protest when the provenance of the wine was revealed, on the grounds that wines of that quality must clearly be French." Australian wines continued to win high honours in French competitions. A Victorian Syrah (also called Shiraz) competing in the 1878 Paris Exhibition was likened to Château Margaux and "its taste completed its trinity of perfection." One Australian wine won a gold medal "first class" at the 1882 Bordeaux International Exhibition and another won a gold medal "against the world" at the 1889 Paris International Exhibition.

Chilean wine begun to modernize in 1851 when Silvestre Ochagavia imported cuttings of French varieties. Silvestre Ochagavia is credited with introducing the varieties Cabernet Sauvignon, Pinot noir, Cot, Merlot, Semillon and Riesling into Chile. Other wealthy wine growers followed suite. By the 1870s the wine industry was the most developed area of Chilean agriculture.

In 1863, a phylloxera plague was detected in France, which then spread throughout Europe, destroying quality European grapevines. In 1873, it appeared in California, in 1875 in Australia, and in 1880 in South Africa, becoming a global catastrophe. Chilean grapevines, however, remained free of the plague and subsequently contributed significantly to the global recovery of the wine industry.

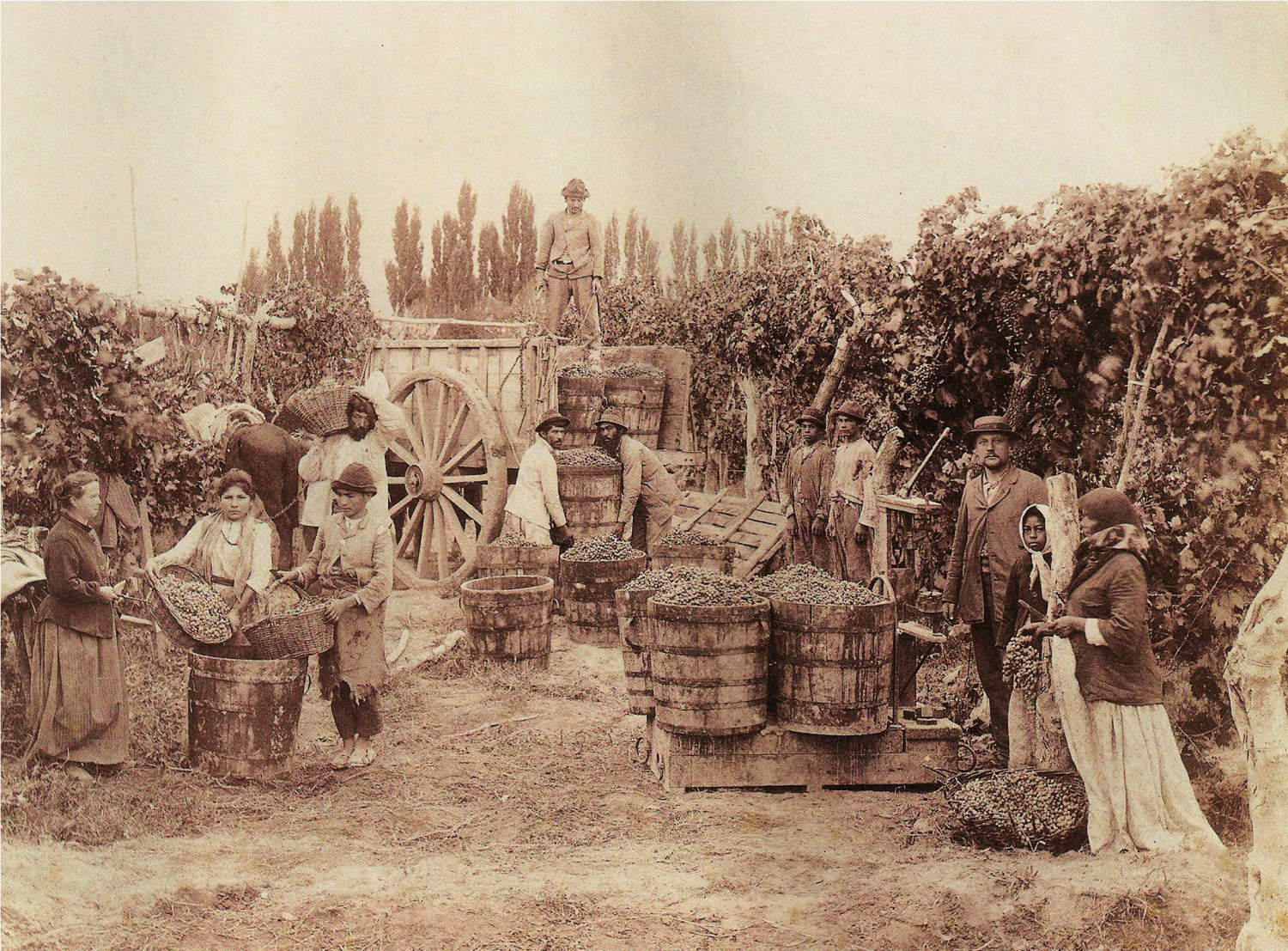
Grape harvest in Mendoza Province of Argentina c. 1890

The region of Mendoza, or historically Cuyo, experienced an unprecedented wine-boom in the 19th century and early 20th century which turned it into the fifth winegrowing area of the world and the first in Latin America. The establishment of the Buenos Aires-Mendoza railroad in 1885 ended the lengthy and costly trade with carts that connected these two regions of Argentina and sparked development of vineyards in Mendoza. Furthermore, massive immigration to Río de La Plata mainly from Southern Europe increased demand and bought know-how to the old-fashioned Argentine wine industry. The vineyards of Mendoza totalled 1.000 ha in 1830 but grew to 45.000 in 1910, surpassing Chile which had during the 19th century had a larger areas planted with vines and a more modern industry. By 1910 around 80% of the area of Argentine vineyards were planted with French stock, mainly Malbec.

During the 19th century Peruvian wine-making went further into decline. Demand in industrialized Europe caused many Peruvian winegrowers to shift the land use from vineyards to lucrative cotton fields, contributing further to the decline of the wine and pisco industry. This was particularly true during the time of the American Civil War (1861–1865) when the cotton prices skyrocketed due to the Blockade of the South and its cotton fields. Also in South Africa did wine making suffer a stunning blow in the 1860s with the implementation of the Cobden–Chevalier Treaty in 1860 that forced South African wines to compete with French wines in Britain and resulted a doubling of French wine imports to Britain. South African vineyards also suffered a second setback after the arrival of the Phylloxera plague in the 1880s.

Wine production in the Americas in 1907
Country	Share (%)
Argentina	39.51
Chile	33.64
United States	19.93
Brazil	3.98
Peru	1.22
Uruguay	1.14
Bolivia	0.32
Mexico	0.22

=== 20th century ===
Chilean wine exports to Argentina were hampered by the lack of effective land transport and a series of war scares. This situation changed after the Pactos de Mayo were signed in 1902 and the inauguration of the Transandine Railway in 1909, making war unlikely and trade across the Andes easy. Governments agreed to sign a free trade agreement. Argentine winegrowers association, Centro Vitivinícola Nacional, dominated by European immigrants protested vigorously against the free trade agreement since Chilean wines were considered a threat to the local industry. The complaints of Argentine wine growers in conjunction with that of cattle farmers in Chile ended up tearing down the plans for a free trade agreement.

== Characteristics of New World wines ==
=== Style ===
Since New World vineyards are generally in hotter climates than those of Central-Northern Europe – in fact some major New World regions are irrigated desert – New World grapes tend to be riper. Thus New World wines tend to be correspondingly more alcoholic and full-bodied. Critics such as Robert M. Parker, Jr. have influenced New World producers and consumers towards a fruitier style, with more use of new oak. However, in recent years there has been a reaction against some of the very oaky, alcoholic styles that typified late 1980s Australian Chardonnays for example, as cooler vineyards have been identified and winemakers have become more sophisticated and more restrained.

=== Varietal labelling ===
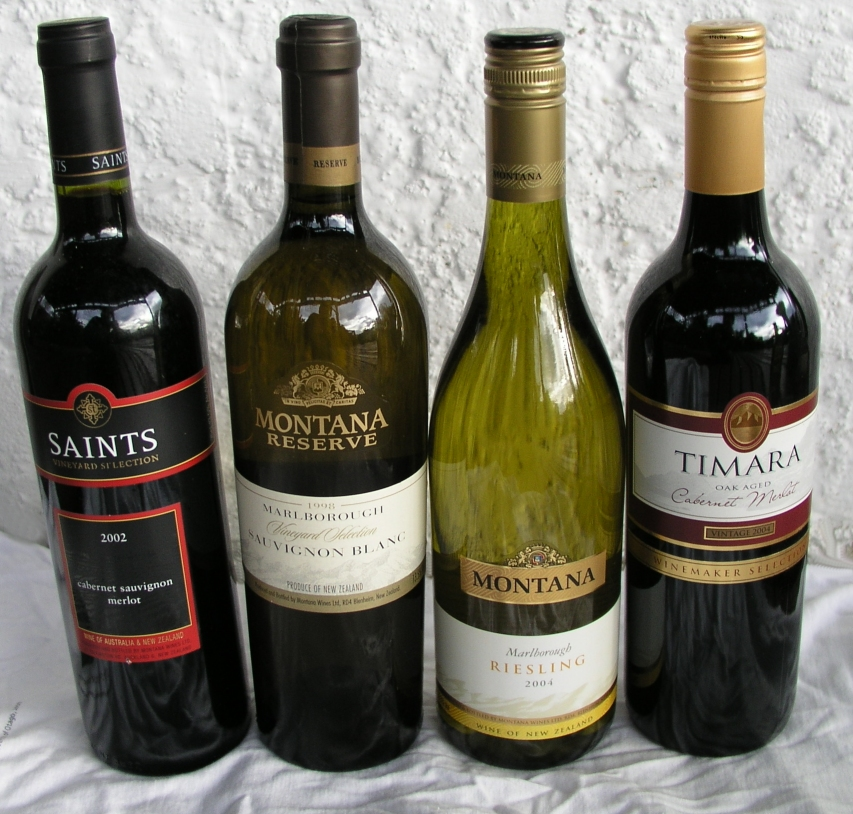
Varietal wines from Montana of New Zealand

Traditionally New World wine used names of well-known European regions, such as Burgundy, Champagne, Sherry, Port, and Hock. This gave consumers a general idea of how the wine might taste. This changed as winemakers developed the confidence to develop their own styles of wine such as Grange. Europeans producers objected to the use of their regional names, and writers such as Frank Schoonmaker in the US encouraged the use of varietal names as used on Alsace wine. One reason was that unlike Europe, there was no history of particular localities being associated with particular styles of wine, and winemakers might buy in grapes from many sources. Indeed, wines such as Grange specifically ignored the origin of the grapes in order to achieve a more consistent style. So led by winemakers such as Robert Mondavi, varietal labelling became common during the 1960s and 1970s, and has since spread to most of Eastern Europe and much of Western Europe.

Subsequently, New World winemakers have 'rediscovered' the art of blending wines, with blends such as Shiraz/Cabernet Sauvignon, Semillon/Sauvignon blanc and the Rhone combination of Grenache, Shiraz and Mourvedre ("GSM") all becoming more common. And as New World viticulturists have better understood the soils and climates of their vineyards, terroir has come to the New World, with the 'terra rossa' of Coonawarra known for its Cabernet Sauvignons, and the Eden Valley and Clare Valley and Chile's Bío-Bío Valley for Riesling.

=== Marketing ===
Being less dependent on geography, New World wines have placed more emphasis on branding as a marketing tool, following the example set by Germany's Blue Nun and Portugal's Mateus Rosé, brands created in 1927 and in 1942 respectively. One particular style of branding has been the 'critter wines' that use animals on their labels. Without the partible inheritance of the Napoleonic Code to worry about, New World vineyards tend to be very much bigger than those in Burgundy for example, which has allowed economies of scale and a better ability to negotiate with mass market retailers. With supermarkets selling an increasing proportion of wine in many markets, New World producers are better positioned to take advantage of this trend towards high volumes and low margins.

=== Ownership ===
The greater size of New World wine companies has made them attractive targets for multinational drinks companies seeking to exploit the trend towards drinking wine rather than beer or spirits. Thus, the Foster's Group bought up both Beringer Blass (a holding company for Wolf Blass, Mildara Wines and many others) and Southcorp Wines (holding company for Penfolds, Lindeman's, Wynns and many others). Pernod-Ricard have bought Montana Wines, Diageo own Blossom Hill, and Constellation Brands have a portfolio that spans the New World, from Ravenswood and Vincor to Nobilo and Hardys.

== Wine-making countries ==
=== Argentina ===
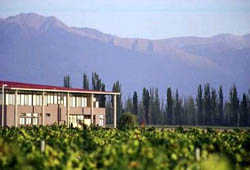
Tapiz Winery in Agrelo, Mendoza

Argentina is the world's fifth biggest wine producer though it has traditionally had a high domestic consumption (in 2006, Argentines averaged over 40 litres per capita in one year). It has a long tradition of winemaking under the Spanish, going back to 1557, but the industry has been influenced by more recent immigrants, notably Italians and also Germans. Exports increased during the mid-1990s following the success of their neighbours in Chile, and accelerated after the economic crisis of 2002.

The long history of viticulture in Argentina has brought forth the evolution of many local varieties, but perhaps the most typically Argentine grape is the Torrontés, which makes an aromatic white wine. However, Argentines love red wine to go with their famous steaks. Malbec has proven to be the most successful variety in export markets, with Barbera and "Bonarda" (now known to be Corbeau, a minor variety from Savoie) being blended into more affordable wines.

The Mendoza Province, which is Argentina's main producer, has also gained recognition from the wine tourism business due to important investments in new wineries and hotel accommodations. Other producing areas include San Juan, Salta, La Rioja, Catamarca, Rio Negro and the Buenos Aires wine region.

=== Australia ===
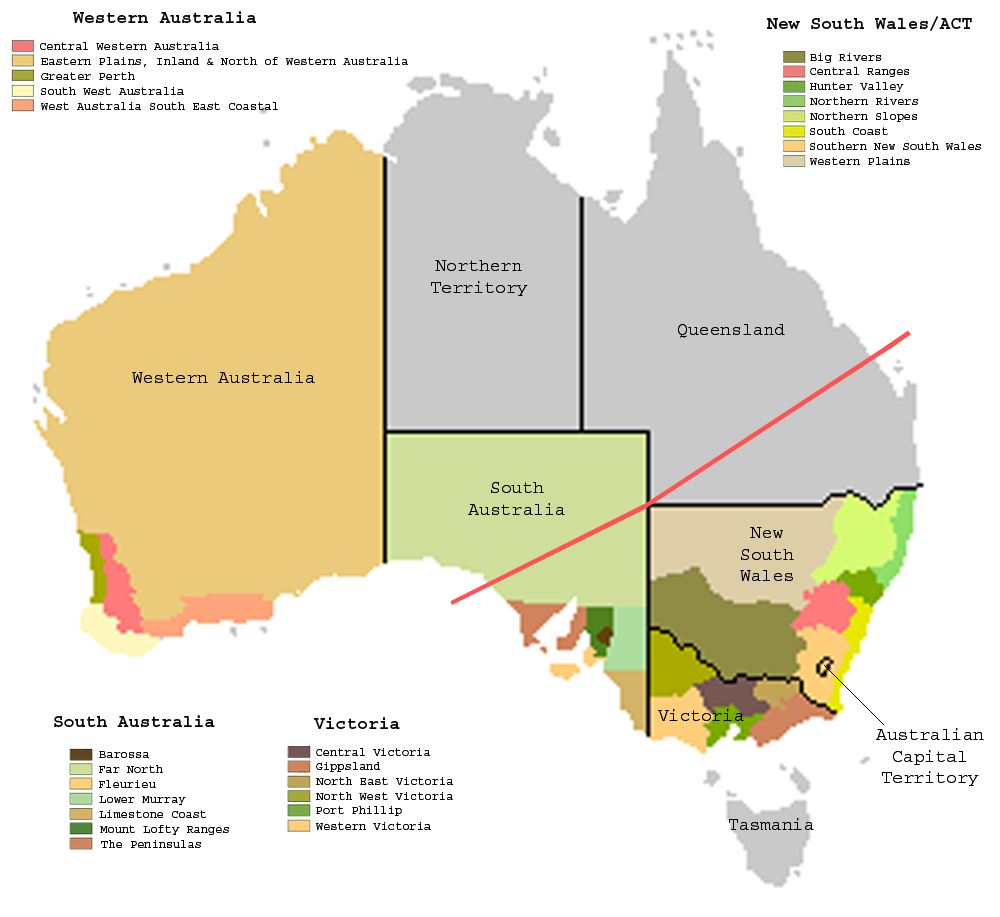
Australian wine areas

Vine cuttings from South Africa were brought on the First Fleet (1788), and though the settlers took time to adapt to the new conditions, wine exports began in 1822. As mentioned above, by the 1880s Australian wines were winning prizes in Europe. Phylloxera struck in eastern winegrowing regions from the 1870s, leading to the destruction of many vineyards. With South Australia free from Phylloxera it contains some of the oldest continuously harvested vineyards on earth.

Penfolds Grange and others led the revival of interest in table wines, which culminated in 2000, when Australia sold more wine to the United Kingdom than did France.

While some Australian wines, their Chardonnays in particular, have previously been criticized for being over-oaked and over-ripe, Australian winemaking is now some of the most sophisticated in the world, with vineyards increasingly planted in cooler climates, such as Pinot noir in Tasmania, and unoaked wines becoming popular. Several regional specialities have emerged, notably Shiraz in the Barossa Valley, Cabernet Sauvignon in Coonawarra, Riesling in the Eden Valley and Clare Valley, and Hunter Valley Sémillon. Rutherglen Muscats are perhaps the finest fortified wines of the New World.

=== Brazil ===
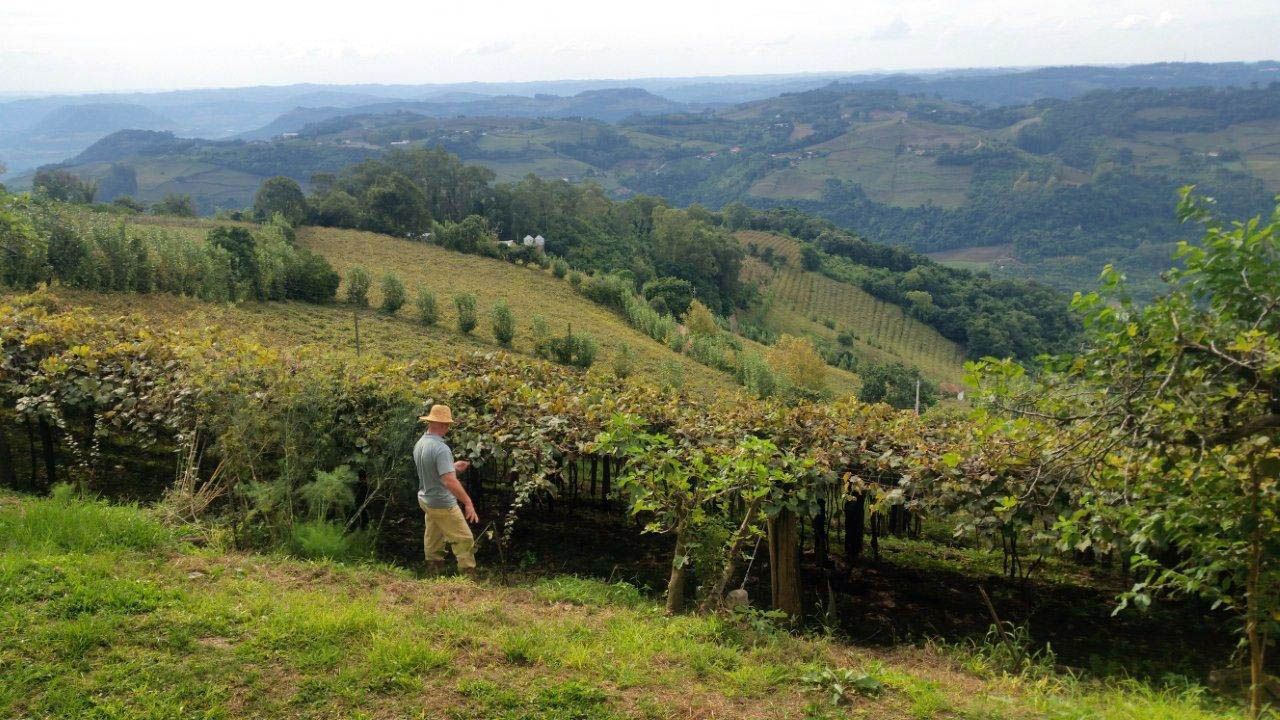
Vineyards in the Vale dos Vinhedos, in the state of Rio Grande do Sul

Brazil is the third-largest producer of wine in Latin America, behind Argentina and Chile. Better-quality wines (Brazilian Portuguese: vinho fino) are produced from the European grapevine. In 2003, only some 5,000 ha (12,000 acres) were planted with such vines.

=== Canada ===
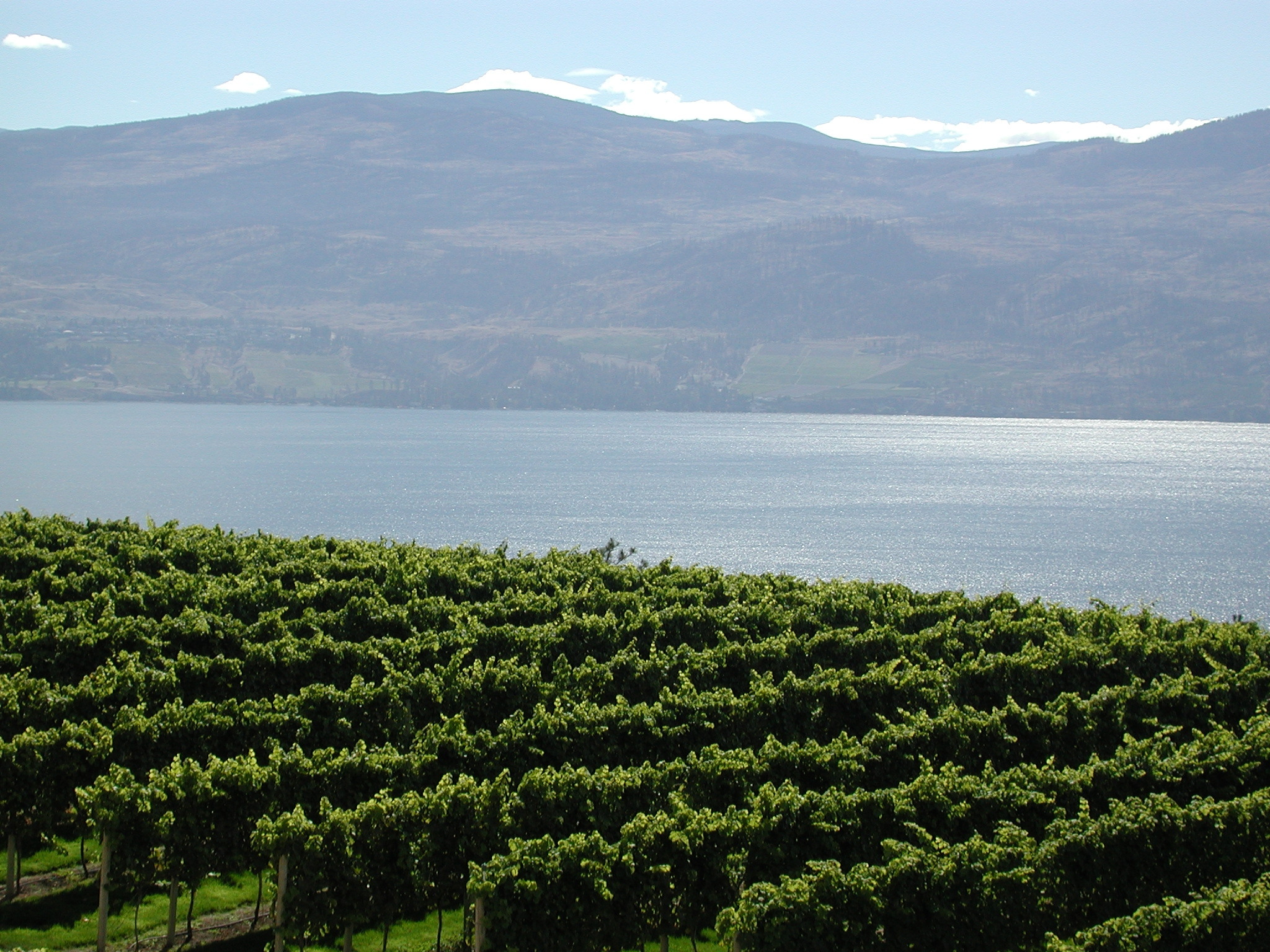
Vineyards near Lake Okanagan in British Columbia

Canada followed a similar path to the eastern United States – early attempts to grow Vitis vinifera failed, leading to a significant export industry based on Vitis labrusca and Vitis riparia, fortified to disguise the 'foxy' aromas. The country had its own version of Prohibition until 1927, and after it ended red tape inhibited the industry until 1974. In the following years improved viticulture and grape varieties allowed a substantial expansion of the industry in the 1990s, centered around the parts of Southern Ontario warmed by the Great Lakes, and in the Okanagan Valley of southern British Columbia. While there has been some progress with red wines from the Bordeaux varieties and Pinot noir, Canada's most successful wines are ice wines made from grapes such as Riesling, Vidal, and even Cabernet Franc.

=== Chile ===
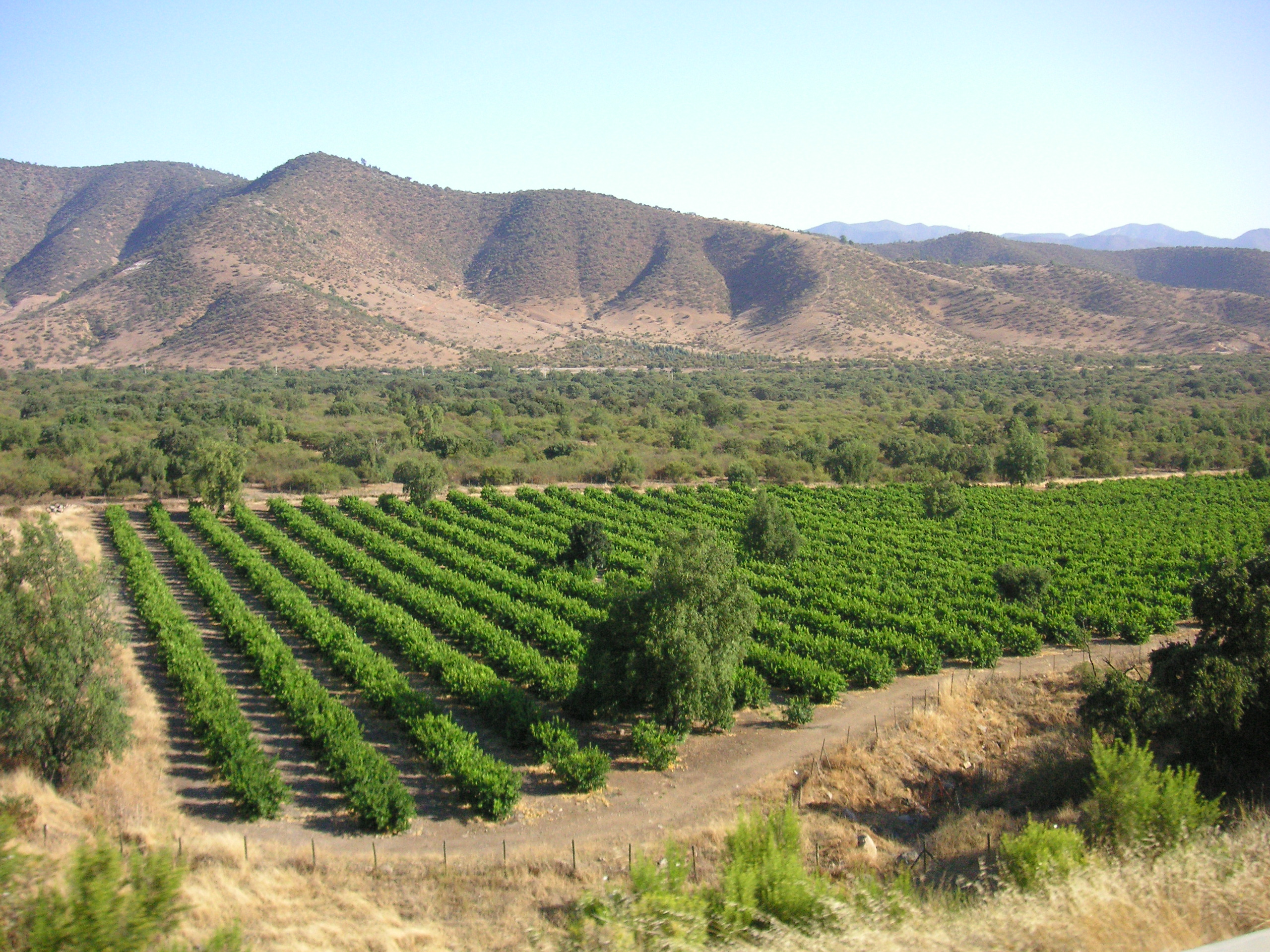
Many of Chile's vineyards are found on flat land within the foothills of the Andes.

Chilean viticulture dates back to the Conquistadores. The Bordeaux varieties arrived in the mid-19th century, although for a long time many of the vines thought to be Merlot were in fact Carménère, and the latter has become something of a signature grape. It is the seventh biggest producer of wine in the world; traditionally quantity was favored over quality, and red tape discouraged improvement. Under the Pinochet reforms of the 1980s, investments were made in wineries and vineyards, and exports began in earnest in the mid-1990s. Traditionally Chilean vineyards were in semi-arid areas irrigated by water from the Andes, but there has been increasing interest in cooler areas such as the Leyda Valley (becoming known for its Pinot noir) and the Bío-Bío Valley, which suits Riesling and Gewürztraminer.

Chile is notable for being one of the few vine-growing regions to be free of phylloxera.

=== Colombia ===
The wine history of Colombia was different from other countries in the region. Wine was mainly produced for religious reasons by Catholic priests in monasteries across the country. Due to the restrictions in allowing European immigrants to enter the country after the independence from Spain, the wine industry did not develop like in other South American countries. Beer and aguardiente became more popular drinks than wine. There are a few areas in Colombia that produce fine wine of excellent quality, but the majority of the wine is consumed locally. Villa de Leyva is a small region, north of Bogotá, which is known for its Mediterranean climate and the wine produced in these areas is of very high international standards. El Valle del Cauca, south of Bogotá, is also a well known winery area. Wines in Colombia tend to be sweeter due to the climate of the Andes, hot weather and constant rain.

=== Japan ===
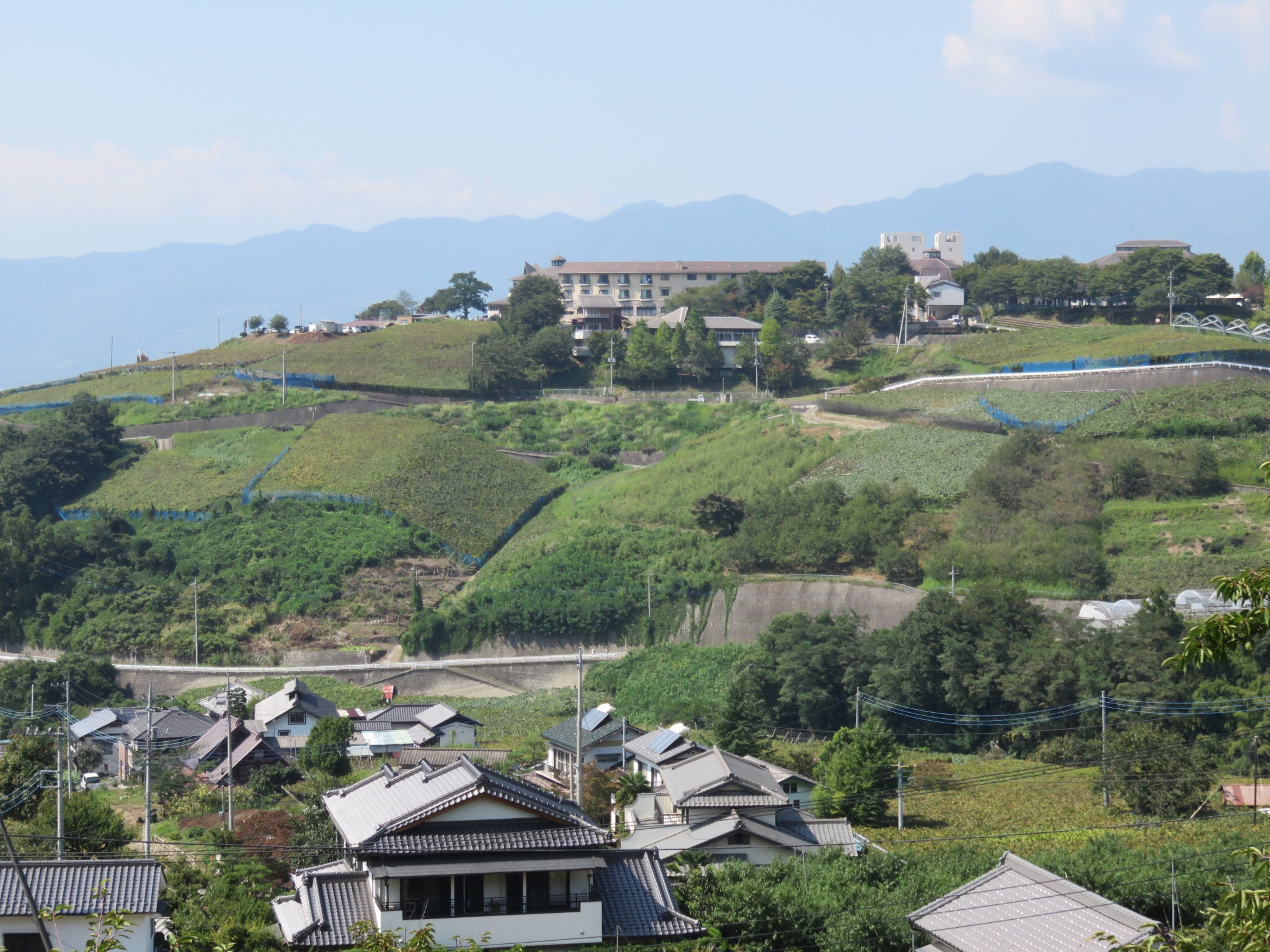
Vineyards in Kōshū, Yamanashi, Japan

Although viticulture and the cultivation of grapes for table consumption has a long history in Japan, domestic wine production using locally-produced grapes only really began with the adoption of Western culture during the Meiji restoration in the second half of the 19th century. The Agency states the share of Japanese wine, as defined as domestically-produced wine from domestically-grown grapes, as only 4% of total domestic consumption, or 14,988 kiloliters. Only 58 kiloliters of Japanese wine was exported overseas.

=== Mexico ===
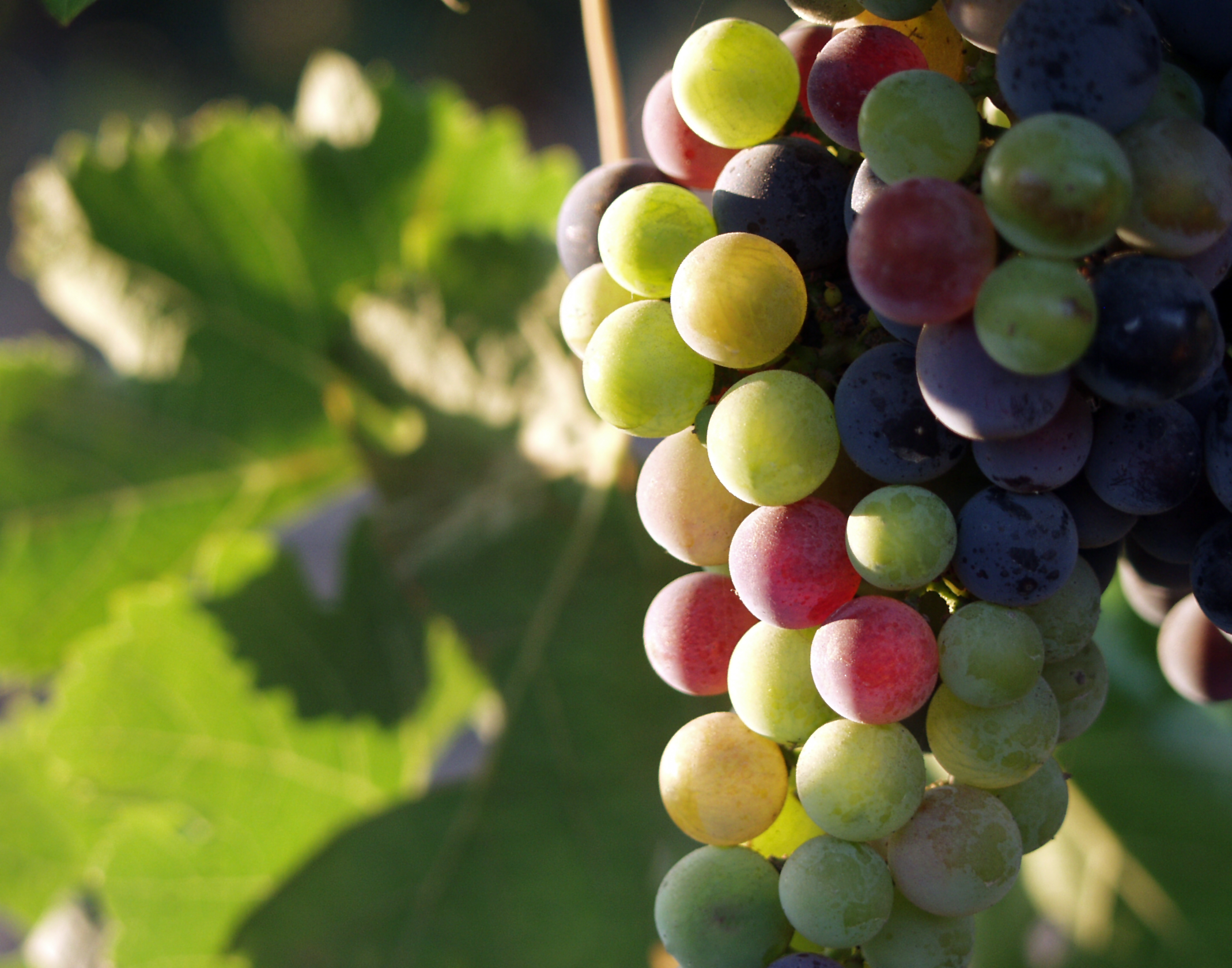
Grapes during pigmentation in Baja California, Mexico

Mexico is the oldest wine-making region in the Americas.

In 1549, Spanish explorers and settlers came across a fertile valley in the present-day state of Coahuila where they encountered native vines and founded the Mission of Santa María de las Parras or "Holy Mary of the Vines". In 1597, the Hacienda de San Lorenzo was established by the Spanish settler Don Lorenzo García, where he founded, along with other Spanish missionaries, Casa Madero – the oldest winery house in the Americas.

Many of the vines from Parras de la Fuente, Coahuila and other places in Mexico were the first to be exported and cultivated in what is now California, as well as other provinces in Northern New Spain and other Spanish colonies in South America. In 1699, the King of Spain – alarmed by competition from the New World – prohibited wine production in New Spain, with the exception of wines for the church. The prohibition lasted until the Mexico's independence from Spain in 1810.

As of the 2013, about 90% of Mexican wine is produced in the northwestern state of Baja California, neighboring the wine-producing region of California in the U.S., particularly in the Valley of Guadalupe, Ensenada Municipality.

=== New Zealand ===
The New Zealand viticulture industry was started in a small way by Croatian immigrants at the end of the 19th century, but it was not until the 1970s that it began to flourish. Several factors came together at that time - Britain's entry into the European Economic Community in 1973 ended favourable terms of agricultural trade, while New Zealanders themselves developed a taste for wine as local alcohol licensing laws changed and cheap air travel exposed them to different cultures.

Various grapes were tried in the early years, but it was in the 1980s that New Zealand developed the distinctive style of Sauvignon blanc that became its trademark. Since then the Burgundy grapes of Chardonnay and Pinot noir have been developed in cooler, more southerly vineyards, with considerable success. More recently there has been increasing popularity for the 'aromatic' white varieties such as Gewürztraminer and Riesling, with Auslese styles also being attempted.

=== Peru ===
The first grapevines were brought to Peru shortly after its conquest by Spain. Spanish chroniclers from the time note that the first vinification in South America took place in the hacienda Marcahuasi of Cuzco. However, the largest and most prominent vineyards of the 16th and 17th century Americas were established in the Ica valley of south-central Peru. In the 1540s, Bartolomé de Terrazas and Francisco de Carabantes began vineyards in Peru. The latter established vineyards in Ica, which Spaniards from Andalucia and Extremadura used to introduce grapevines into Chile.

In 1687 the whole southern coast of Peru was struck by the 1687 Peru earthquake which destroyed the cities of Villa de Pisco and Ica. The earthquake destroyed wine cellars and mud containers used for wine storage. This event marked the end of the Peruvian wine-boom.

In 2008, there were some 14,000 hectares (35,000 acres) of grape plantations in Peru, including table grapes, and some 610,000 hectolitres (13,000,000 imp gal; 16,000,000 US gal) of wine was produced, with an increasing trend in both plantations and wine production. Most vineyards are located on the central coast, around Pisco and Ica, where most of Peru's winemaking and distillation takes place.

=== South Africa ===
Wine was first produced in South Africa by the founder of Cape Town in 1659, and by the late 18th century Constantia, made from Muscat de Frontignan (Muscat Blanc à Petits Grains), was popular among European royalty. However the vineyards were decimated by phylloxera and the KWV cooperative that ran most of the industry since 1918 gave little encouragement to produce quality wine. The end of apartheid sparked a wave of investment and innovation in the vineyards of the Cape, although there remains large areas of undistinguished grape varieties such as Colombard. Stellenbosch and Paarl can produce world-class wines from the Bordeaux varieties, Shiraz and also from Pinotage, a variety bred locally from Pinot noir and Cinsaut. South Africa is also the second home of Chenin blanc, known until the mid-20th century as Steen; Muscat Blanc à Petits Grains is known locally as red and white Muscadel, and is once again being used to make Constantia.

=== United States ===
Although wine is made throughout the United States, 90% of it comes from California. The Gallo Winery runs an industrial facility in Modesto, California that produces the majority of the state's wine exports. Most of the rest is split between the states of Washington and New York, followed by Oregon. California's earliest grape vines were imported from New Spain, or Mexico, which in turn were brought by Spanish explorers and settlers. North America has several native species of Vitis, from which wine has been made for a long time in the east of the country, although the 'foxy' aromas of wines produced from these species are not to everyone's taste. The Catawba variety led the way for winemaking from native species, first in Ohio and later in the Finger Lakes area of New York. California followed a path similar to Latin American countries, with Spanish missionaries starting the first vineyard of vinifera vines in 1769, and later immigrants from Bordeaux and Italy bringing their native grapes with them. Soon a thriving industry developed, particularly in the Napa Valley, which was stopped in its tracks by phylloxera and, uniquely, Prohibition (1920–1933).

One interesting consequence of Prohibition was that vineyards were replanted with lower quality grapes such as Alicante Bouschet that could survive transportation to home winemakers, and this tradition of home winemaking changed taste preferences from a dry style before Prohibition to a much sweeter style. In general Prohibition had a devastating effect on commercial winemaking in the country, which only started to recover in the late 1960s and 1970s under major industry pioneers such as Ernest and Julio Gallo, Robert Mondavi and the world-class viticultural scientists at the University of California, Davis. The latter institution has played a leading role in the recovery of wine in the United States, in particular identifying just what vines were actually planted (notably California's signature grape, the robust red Zinfandel, which was found to be Croatia's Crljenak Kaštelanski), and encouraging the use of better clones of the traditional European varieties. In the 1970s, geographical appellations were designated as American Viticultural Areas.

In the years after Prohibition, the domestic market demanded cheap 'jug wines' and sweet fortified wines. These tastes led to local styles such as White Zinfandel (a sweet rosé) and "bum wines". Interest in traditional European varieties increased after Mondavi reinvented Sauvignon blanc in a dry, heavily oaked style called Fumé Blanc, leading to the innovations that triumphed so spectacularly in Paris in 1976. While California is known for its Cabernet Sauvignon, Zinfandel and Chardonnay in particular, it produces such a massive amount of wine that just about every grape variety ends up being grown there to a greater or lesser extent. For instance, the "Rhone Rangers" have raised awareness of the Rhone varieties, notably Viognier, and there has been speculation that climate change will force California to look further south in Europe for grape varieties. The Northwest states of Oregon and Washington are known for their Pinot noirs and Rieslings while New York continues to produce wine mostly from Vitis labrusca varieties and hybrids.

== See also ==
- International variety
- Old World wine
- List of wine-producing regions

== Bibliography ==
Del Pozo, José (2004) [1998]. Historia del vino chileno (in Spanish) (3 ed.). Editorial Universitaria. ISBN 956-11-1735-5.
