= Treasury Wine Estates =

Australian wine company

Treasury Wine Estates Limited
- Type: Public
- Traded as: ASX: TWE
- Industry: Winemaking
- Predecessor: Foster's Group
- Founded: 2011
- Headquarters: Melbourne, Australia
- Key people: Sam Fischer (CEO); John Mullen (Chairman)
- Products: Penfolds; DAOU; Frank Family Vineyards; Stags' Leap Winery; Beaulieu Vineyard; 19 Crimes; Squealing Pig; Wynns Coonawarra Estate; Matua
- Revenue: ▲ A$2.94 billion (2025); A$2.48 billion (2024)
- Net income: ▲ A$436.9 million (2025); A$322.6 million (2024)
- Number of employees: 2500+
- Website: www.tweglobal.com

Treasury Wine Estates is an Australian global winemaking and distribution business with headquarters in Melbourne. It was formerly the wine division of international brewing company Foster's Group.

== History ==
=== Background ===
Treasury Wine Estates traces its roots back to the establishment of several New World wineries in the 19th century. These include Lindeman's and Penfolds in Australia, and Beringer Vineyards in the United States.

Foster's began to build its wine division from 1995 onwards. Through acquisition, it built the division into one of the world's largest winemakers. By 2005, Beringer Blass was the seventh largest producer of wine in the United States. The same year, Fosters acquired the Australian wine-making group Southcorp, adding famous brands including Lindeman's, Penfolds and Rosemount, and around A$1 billion to revenues.

However, the wine division performed poorly, often draining cash from the highly profitable brewing business. In 2008, Foster's chief executive officer Trevor O'Hoy resigned. By 2011, the company had written down the value of the wines division by half since it acquired it at the peak of the market, leaving it worth about A$3.1 billion.

In 2022 it was ranked the largest Australian wine company by production, and also the largest in terms of total revenue.

=== Fosters Group brewing and wine split ===
After further difficulties in the division resulted in an additional A$1.3 billion write-down, 99 per cent of Fosters Group shareholders agreed at a meeting in Melbourne in April 2011 to split Fosters Group business into separate brewing and wine companies. Treasury Wine Estates officially became a separately listed company the following month, with David Dearie as its CEO.

Further write-down of stock worth around A$160 million took place in 2013, followed by the redundancy of David Dearie and the appointment of interim chief executive Warwick Every-Burns. This left the business in a more fragile state as shares dropped almost A$2 to just above A$4. Steamrollers crushed millions of bottles of cheap wine to dispose of excess stock in the United States. This eventually led to a class-action by disgruntled shareholders which was settled in 2017.

Treasury has since worked with Accolade Wines to promote bottling efficiency, strengthening its performance in Asia, Australia, New Zealand and Europe.

=== Appointment of Michael Clarke as CEO ===
In 2014, the board of directors appointed Michael Clarke, a former food executive with Kraft Foods and Premier Foods, as CEO.

In 2015, Treasury reportedly began reducing its presence in the British market to concentrate on Asia, where margins were much higher. However, later that year Treasury bought the majority of the wine business of London-based multinational Diageo.

In July 2016, Treasury Wine Estates slimmed down its wine portfolio, announcing the sale of 12 cheap wine brands in the United States. The sale of the US brands represented around one million cases of wine.

By 2017, Treasury had begun stockpiling luxury wines and rationing their release in China and the United States. More money was spent marketing the most profitable brands.

In January 2019, Treasury's share price fell dramatically on a slew of news reports and was targeted by short sellers in the markets who accused the company of engaging in illegal practices including "channel stuffing" in attempts to inflate its profits.

=== Appointment of Tim Ford as CEO ===
In July 2020, Michael Clarke stood down as CEO and was replaced by the long-term executive, Tim Ford.

In November 2021, Treasury acquired Napa Valley luxury winemaker Frank Family Vineyards for A$434 million.

In October 2023, the Treasury announced it would acquire US rival Daou Vineyards for at least A$1.4 billion.

In June 2025, TWE opened a A$15 million dealcoholisation plant in the Barossa Valley.

== Operations ==
The business is divided into four regions: (1) Australia and New Zealand, (2) the Americas (i.e. United States and Canada only), (3) Europe (including Latin America), and (4) Asia (including the Middle East and Africa). Globally the company says it has access to more than 13,000 hectares of owned or leased vineyards, with more than 3400 employees, and 36 million cases of wine sold in the 2017 financial year.

In 2013, Treasury Wine had to destroy six million bottle of wines in U.S. due to massive oversupply. The company suffered from a series costly write-downs since its split-off from Fosters. The company was accused of "channel stuffing"- inflating sales by pushing more to wholesalers than they wish.

Treasury Wine tried to capitalize on strong demand of Penfold in China by bundling it with Wolf Blass and Rawson's Retreat. China accounts for half of Treasury's sales in Asia and 80 per cent of its growth in the region, according to a report in 2018. There was a massive supply glut with some distributors in China were said to be sitting on up to three years' worth of stock and deep discounting among wholesalers and retailers. Despite higher taxes and cost of transportation, Rawson's Retreat was selling for less in China than in Australia, some distributors were even giving it away for free when bundled with premium wine.

== Brands ==
Winery	Appellation/Region	Country	External link	Notes
19 Crimes	South Eastern Australia	Australia		
Acacia Winery	Los Carneros	United States		
Annie's Lane	Clare Valley	Australia		Previously named Quelltaler
Beaulieu Vineyard	Rutherford	United States		
Belcreme De Lys	Central Coast	United States		
Beringer Vineyards	Napa Valley	United States		The oldest continuously operating winery in the Napa Valley, founded 1876. The winery is on the National Register of Historic Places as a Historic District.
Blossom Hill	Central Coast	United States		
Castello di Gabbiano	Tuscany	Italy		
Coldstream Hills	Yarra Valley	Australia		
Devil's Lair	Margaret River	Australia		
Daou	Paso Robles	United States		
Etude	Los Carneros	United States		
Fifth Leg	Margaret River	Australia		A label of the Devil's Lair winery.
Greg Norman Estates	(various)	(various)		
Heemskerk	Tasmania	Australia		Other labels: Abel's Tempest, Georg Jensen
Hewitt Vineyard	Rutherford	United States		
Ingoldby	McLaren Vale	Australia		
Jamieson's Run	Limestone Coast	Australia		
Killawarra	"South Eastern Australia"	Australia		Created by Seaview in 1971.
Leo Buring	Clare Valley & Eden Valley	Australia		
Lindeman's	Hunter Valley & Coonawarra	Australia		
Matua Valley Wines	Marlborough	New Zealand		Other labels: Angel Cove
Penfolds	Adelaide Hills & Barossa Valley	Australia		
Pepperjack	Barossa Valley	Australia		
Rawson's Retreat	"South Eastern Australia"	Australia		
Rosemount Estate	McLaren Vale	Australia		
Run Riot	Central Coast	United States		
Saltram	Barossa Valley	Australia		
Secret Stone	Marlborough	New Zealand		
Seppelt	Victoria	Australia		
Shingle Peak	Marlborough	New Zealand		
Sledgehammer	Northern California & Mendoza	United States & Argentina		
Squealing Pig	Marlborough	New Zealand		
St Hubert's	Yarra Valley	Australia		
Stags' Leap Winery	Napa Valley	United States		
Stellina di Notte	Veneto	Italy		
Sterling Vineyards	Napa Valley	United States		
T'Gallant	Mornington Peninsula	Australia		
Wolf Blass	South Australia	Australia		
Wynns Coonawarra	Coonawarra	Australia		
Yellowglen	"South Eastern Australia"	Australia		

== See also ==
- Australian wine
