= Grossi Florentino =

Restaurant in Victoria, Australia

Florentino

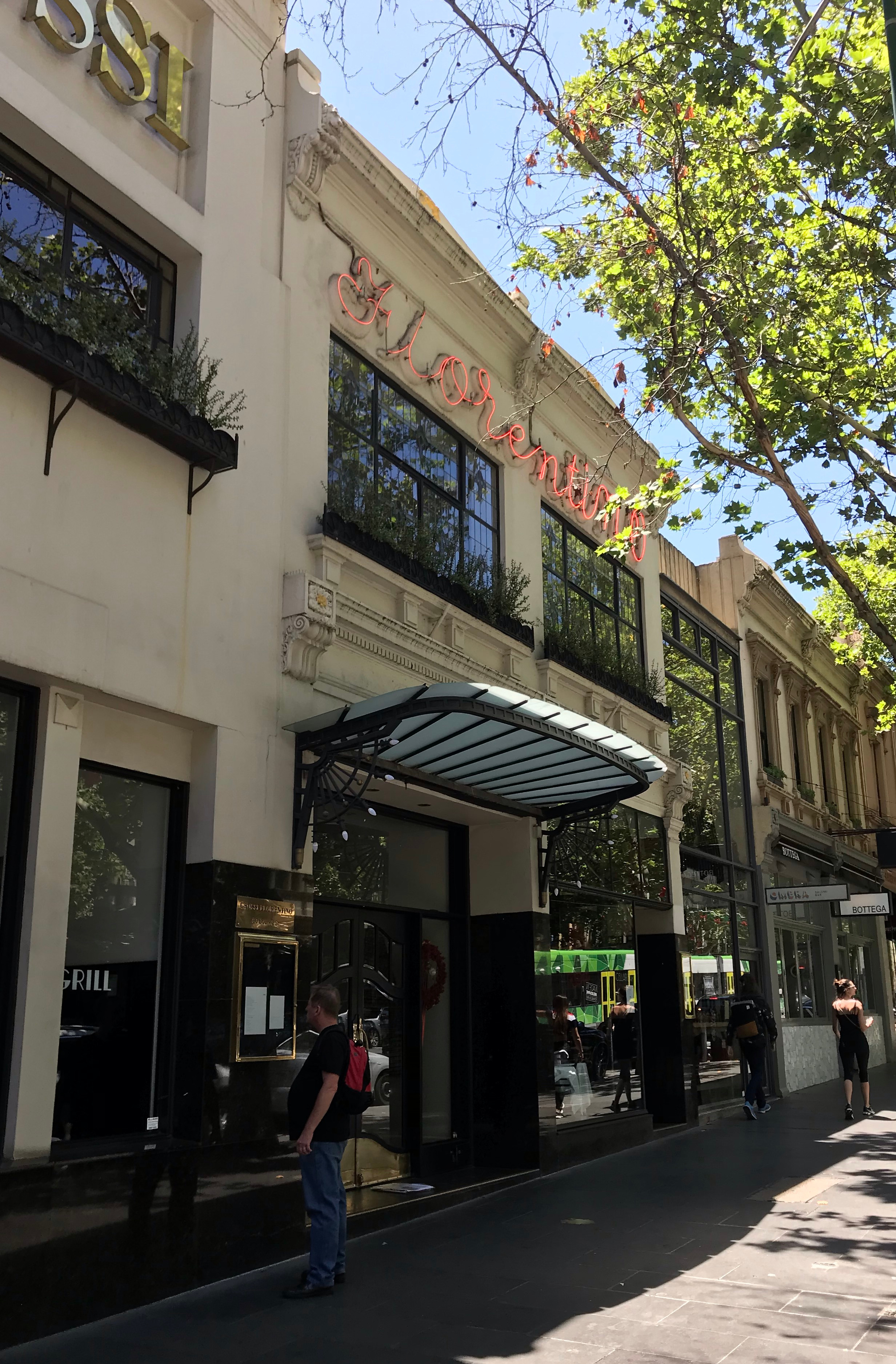
- Interactive map of Florentino

Restaurant information
- Established: 1928
- Owner: edition Hospitality
- Head chef: Brendan Katich, Michael Greenlaw
- Food type: Italian
- Dress code: Smart
- Rating: 2 Chef Hats in 'The Age Good Food Guide'
- Location: 80 Bourke Street, Melbourne, Victoria, 3000, AUSTRALIA
- Coordinates: 37°48′42″S 144°58′15″E
- Seating capacity: 210
- Website: florentino.melbourne

Florentino is one of Melbourne's oldest restaurants. The upstairs Mural Room has been a fine-dining institution since the 1930s.

== History ==
The Florentino (Il Florentino) started out as a wine shop at 78 Bourke Street, bought by recent immigrant Samuel Wynn in 1918, which he then gradually expanded whilst living upstairs. Wynn's wine selling interest gradually moved into wine making, and he went on after WW2 to purchase the Coonawarra Estate vineyard, making Wynn's a household name. In 1920 he purchased the nearby popular Café Denat which he relocated into his former home upstairs in 1924. Rinaldo Massoni then leased the 'Café Denat' in 1928, and changed the name to Café Florentino and the style from French to Italian.

In 1934 the adjacent property at 82 Bourke Street was purchased and the two shops joined together. The new upstairs dining room was extensively decorated to a design by Walter Butler, with 8 murals created by pupils of noted artist Napier Waller; this room was christened 'The Mural Room'.

A chef from The Florentino is said to have made the first ever cassata in Australia. It turned out that the ingredients maraschino, alchermes and crème de menthe were illegal.

In 1941 Rinaldo Massoni died and his son Leon took over the restaurant, with partner George Tsindos.

In 1954 the license of The Florentino was changed from an Australian Wine license to a restaurant, so that the previously illegally sold imported spirits and wines could now be sold openly.

George and Leon opened 'The Cellar', more informal, serving countertop meals. Three years later they opened the 'Bistro Grill' on the opposite side of the staircase.

Leon Massoni sold his share of the restaurant to his partner George, and later owned restaurants including 'Ristorante Massoni' with his partner in business Pietro Grossi, the father of Guy who as of 1999 ran 'Grossi Florentino'. George Tsindos ended a 50-year era by selling The Florentino to Italian Restaurant Melbourne CBD. Failing in health, Branco Tocigl sold The Florentino to property developer Floyd Podgornik in the late 1980s. In 1989 Podgornik controversially undertook extensive alterations to a place that was now considered historic, drawing concern from the National Trust. The upstairs spaces were simply restored, albeit with a new staircase, while the ground level rooms and street windows were completely renovated, but with an eye to their history, notably maintaining the ceiling and the barrel servery in the cellar bar intact. Podgornik committed suicide in March 1990; his widow Lorraine took over through a difficult decade during which many of Melbourne's grand restaurants closed. In 1999 Lorraine sold the 'Florentino' to the Grossi family, who renamed it 'Grossi Florentino'.

In 2013, the Grossi family gave a fresh touch to the upstairs restaurant through a three-month renovation with the help of Architects Mills Gorman.

In late 2025, edition Hospitality took over custodianship of the institution.

== Venues ==
Florentino's maintains the three distinct sections established in the 1930s: the Cellar bar, Café Florentino (formerly known as the Grill) and the Dining Room. 'Cellar Bar' offers simple Italian fare; Café Florentino has an open kitchen focusing on wood-fire cooking and is more relaxed than the Dining Room; the 'Dining Room' upstairs is formal and serves modern and traditional Italian cooking. Florentino Dining Room has two spaces, the Mural Room and the Wynn Room.

The Mural Room

The 'Mural Room' features large murals executed by four pupils of artist Napier Waller in 1934, illustrating scenes of Florence and its surrounds. The murals are classified by The National Trust. The Murals and their artists are as follows:

Panel 1 Calvin Smith This panel depicts Florence at the full height of Renaissance achievement. On the left is Ghiberti, the designer of the wonderful bronze doors of the baptistery, talking to Donatello and Luco della Robbia, the sculptors who helped to cast the doors. Artists Raphael, Michelangelo and Botticelli are in the centre of the art piece. Leonardo da Vinci is further to the right among artists determining the position of Michelangelo's "David".

Panel 2 Jeane Diamond Lorenzo de' Medici, the Magnificent (1441-1492) is the main subject of this panel, as he rides through the streets of Florence.

Panel 3 Anne Montgomery This panel depicts events from the 13th Century to the early 15th century, showing Giotto as a boy, Cimabue to forerunner of new art, Arnoldo de Cambro, Francis Talenti and Brunelleschi, all those who helped create the 'Duomo'. Also depicted are Boccaccio, Dante and Beatrice.

Panel 4 Walter Beaumont The figures painted in this panel are representatives of the nobility of 14th century Florence. It features a typical nobleman preparing, with the aid of a follower, to visit the festival of the Cur in Florence. The lovers symbolise the romantic spirit of the period. This scene is portrayed in a private garden on the outskirts of the city.

Panel 5 Jeane Diamond This panel depicts Bibbiena, a little Tuscan hill city, possessing some fine Renaissance palaces. The town is known as the birthplace of Cardinal Bibbiena. The river Arno is painted running through the country and the foot of the Bibbiena.

Panel 6 Calvin Smith Pictured in this panel is the small town Fiesole, that overlooks Florence on the other side of the hill. The Arno River flows into the foreground. The figures that appear near have just bathed in the river's waters. The young man who appears to be waving at his companion is in fact controlling his balance on the crumbling riverbank.

Panel 7 Anne Montgomery On the high road between Florence and Siena, the hill town of San Gimignano is pictured in a scene of struggle between the rival factions of the Guelphs and Ghibellines. Its many towers bear witness to those stormy times. Late in the 13th century, Dante was sent to this city as emissary from Florence.

Panel 8 Jeane Diamond This panel is Vallombrosa a hill town with its half-ruined shrines and chapel which are surrounded by pine forests and vineyards. Beneath Vallombrosa, across the forest, unfolds the beauty of the valley of the Arno River. Beside it runs the road which Dante and Saint Francis of Assisi trod.

Panel 9 Walter Beaumont This mural illustrates the first Roman bridge over the Arno, Ponte Vecchio, constructed by Caius Flaminius in year 187BC, when he drove the road from Orezzo to Cisalpine through the valley of the Arno.

== See also ==
- List of restaurants in Australia
