= Philip Shaw =

Philip Shaw may refer to:

- Philip A. Shaw, British philologist
- Philip Shaw (winemaker), Australian winemaker

== See also ==
- Philip R. Shawe, American businessman
