= Acacia Winery =

Coordinates: 38.22216°N 122.26590°W

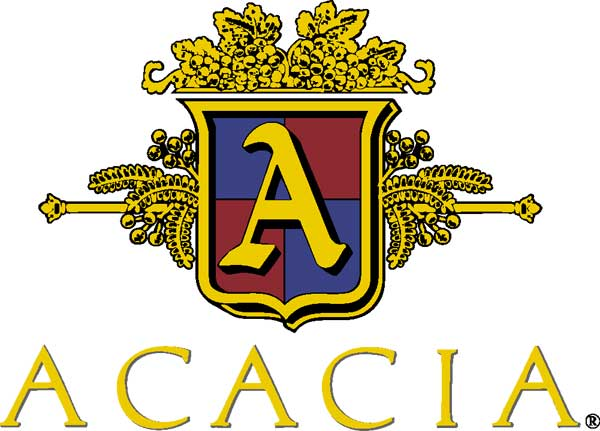
- Location: California, USA
- Appellation: Carneros AVA
- Founded: 1979
- Cases/yr: 55,000
- Known for: Chardonnay
- Varietals: Chardonnay, Pinot noir, Viognier, Sauvignon blanc, Syrah
- Distribution: International
- Website: www.acaciavineyard.com

Acacia Winery, also known as Acacia Vineyard or simply Acacia, is a winery in the Carneros Valley appellation in Napa County, California, United States. Acacia Winery was founded in 1979 by co-founder Michael Richmond and others on Las Amigas Road. The winery primarily produced pinot noir and Chardonnay wines including the following lines: Reserve, SVS Wines, Carneros Blend, A, From Acacia (fruit from the central coast), and Estate Pinot (2001-2002). Paul Perret became the sole general partner of Lakeside Winery, the owner of Acacia, and sold the winery to Chalone in July, 1986.

== History ==
Acacia was co-founded in 1979 by Michael Richmond and Jerry Goldstein. The two met while Richmond was a winery tour guide and apprentice at Freemark Abbey. Larry Brooks was their founding winemaker.

In 1987, Michael Richmond represented Acacia Winery in the International Pinot Noir Celebration by Linfield Events. It was noted in the event that 1/3 of Acacia's Chardonnay production was grown on its estate and their Pinot Noir was outsourced to other vineyards in the Carneros area.

Acacia was an important influence in establishing the Los Carneros wine region and has reputation for being the first winery in California to make "vineyard-designated" pinot noir from outside fruits. The winery has been described as a Pinot Noir "cult" winery during this period.

Acacia was involved a series of purchases. In 1986, Acacia was sold to Chalone for $8 million. Since the 1990s, Acacia, producing under Chalone, has focused on Chardonnay wines, as well as some sparkling wine. Acacia also bottles under the Caviste label. The annual production is around 55,000 cases. In 2005, the Chalone Wine Group was purchased by Diageo, one of the largest wine and spirits company in the world, for $260 million. In 2016, Treasury Wine Estates purchased the Diageo wine portfolio, including Acacia. Soon afterwards, the winery building was purchased by Peju Province Winery. Treasury Wine Estates retained the brand and continues to produce and sell Acacia wines.

== Related pages ==
- Chalone Vineyard
- Treasury Wine Estates
- Category:Wineries in Napa Valley
