= Devil's Lair (wine) =

Winery in Western Australia

- Location: Rocky Road, Forest Grove WA 6285, Australia
- Coordinates: 34°03′54″S 115°06′55″E
- Wine region: Margaret River
- Other labels: Fifth Leg
- Founded: 1985
- Parent company: Treasury Wine Estates
- Known for: Margaret River (red)
- Varietals: Chardonnay, Cabernet Sauvignon, Cabernet franc, Merlot, Sauvignon blanc, Semillon, Shiraz
- Distribution: International
- Tasting: Not available
- Website: Devil's Lair

Devil's Lair is an Australian winery based at Forest Grove, in the Margaret River wine region of Western Australia. It is named after the Devil's Lair cave, which is just across the Bussell Highway from the winery's vineyard.

Established in 1985, the winery was acquired in December 1996 by Southcorp, which was later taken over by Foster's Group. In May 2011, Foster's Group's wine business, including Devil's Lair, was spun off into a separate company, Treasury Wine Estates.

The Devil's Lair winery also makes the wines marketed under the brand name "Fifth Leg".

== See also ==
- Australian wine
- List of wineries in Western Australia
- Western Australian wine
