= Philip Shaw (winemaker) =

Australian winemaker

Philip Shaw is an Australian winemaker.

== Early life and education ==
Philip Shaw was born around 1947 and graduated from Roseworthy College in 1969.

== Winemaking ==
Shaw began his career at Lindeman's where he became head of production at the firm's "Carawa" winery. He later moved to Lindemans Karadoc Winery as general manager. He has elsewhere been described as the company's technical process manager.

In 1982, he become chief winemaker at Rosemount Estate, and following the Rosemount Estate merger with Southcorp Wines in 2001, he became head of production for the group until 2003.

In 2004, Shaw moved to Orange, NSW as the interim CEO of Cumulus Wines, as well as to launch his new brand, Philip Shaw Wines. The first commercial release of the Philip Shaw Wines was in 2008. The Philip Shaw Cellar Door opened in 2014.

In 2015, Shaw established Hoosegg Wines using grapes from his Koomooloo Vineyard.

== Awards ==
Shaw received the International Winemaker of the Year award at the International Wine and Spirit Competition in 1986 and 2000.

In 1999, he was awarded Qantas Gourmet Traveller WINE Magazine Winemaker of the Year and the 2000 Graham Gregory Trophy for his contribution to the Australian wine industry.

== See also ==
- List of wine personalities
