= Beringer Vineyards =

Winery in California's Napa Valley

Coordinates: 38.510158°N 122.479886°W

Beringer
- Location: St. Helena, California, USA
- Appellation: Napa Valley
- Founded: 1876
- Parent company: Treasury Wine Estates
- Distribution: International
- Tasting: Open to the public
- Website: http://www.beringer.com/

U.S. National Register of Historic Places
- Official name: Beringer Brothers-Los Hermanos Winery
- Reference no.: 01000878

California Historical Landmark
- Official name: Beringer Brothers Winery
- Reference no.: 814

Beringer Vineyards is a large winery in St. Helena, California. Founded in 1876, Beringer Vineyards is "the oldest continuously operating winery in the Napa Valley", and is listed under both the National Register of Historic Places and as a California Historical Landmark. In 1934 it was the first California winery to offer public tours and wine tasting following the repeal of Prohibition. In 1939, Beringer invited attendees of the Golden Gate International Exposition to visit the winery; the winery also invited Hollywood stars including Clark Gable, Charles Laughton, and Carole Lombard to visit.

== Rhine House ==
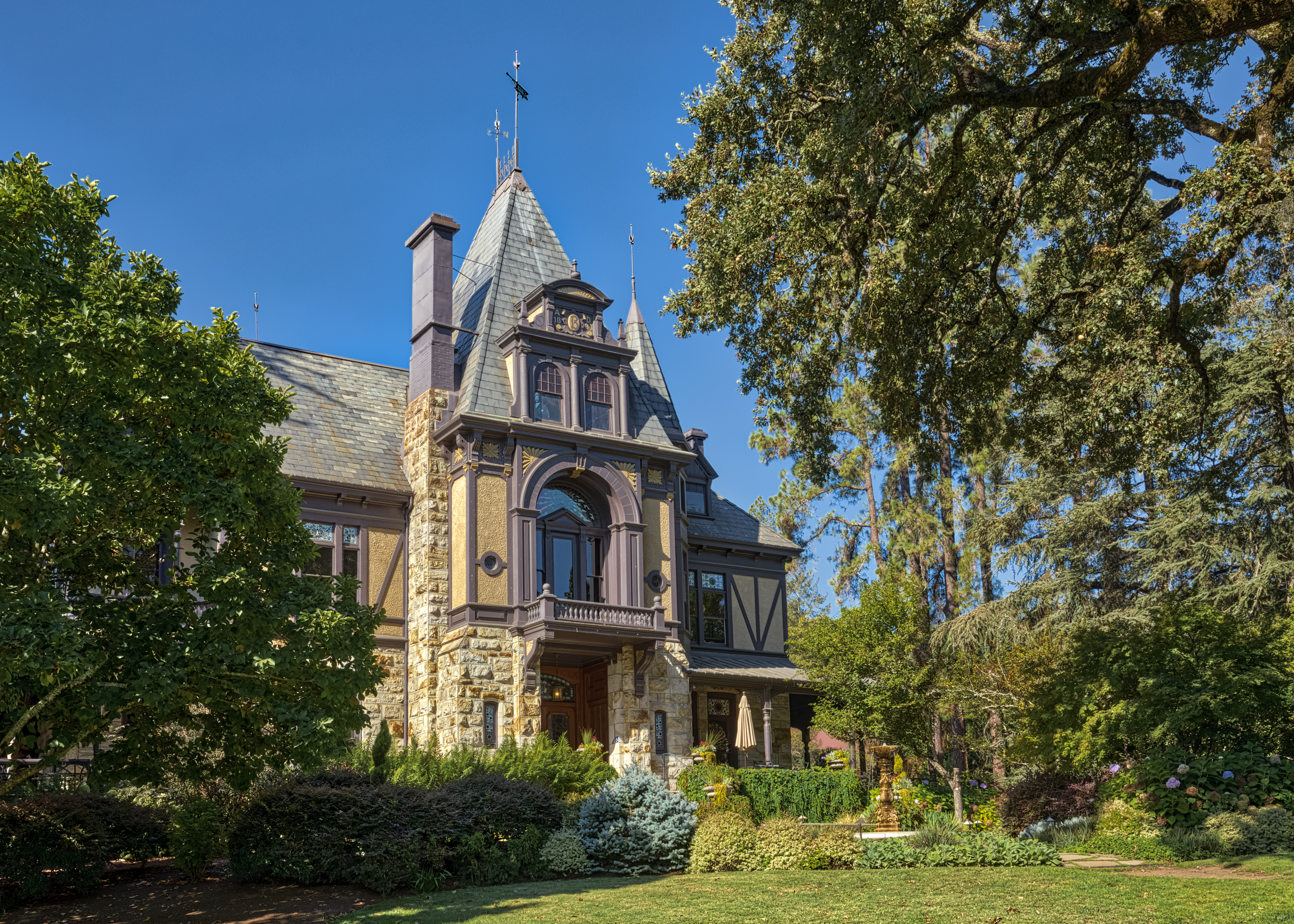
The Rhine House

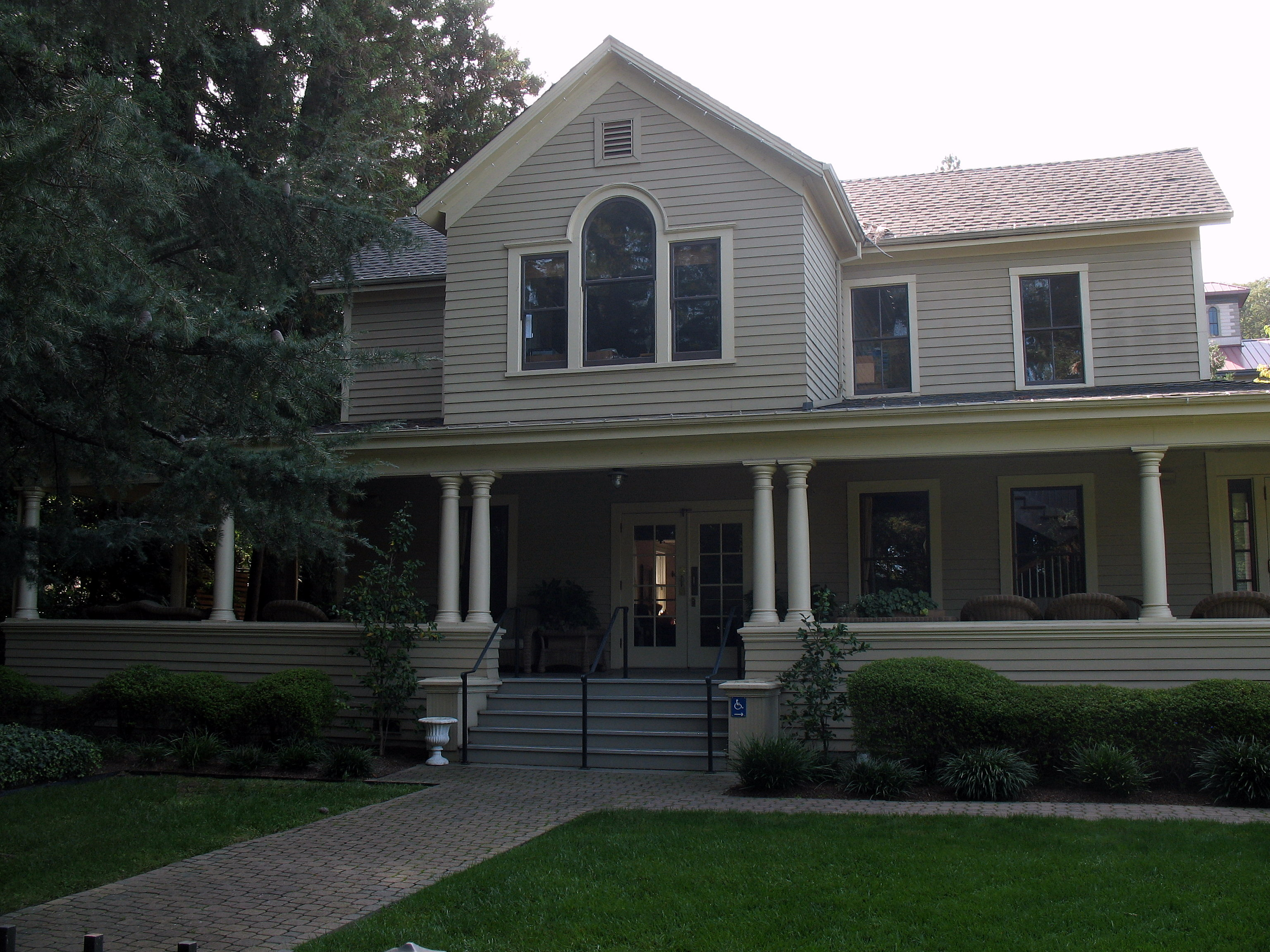
The Hudson House

The estate was listed on the National Register of Historic Places in 2001. The property includes 12 buildings, sites, or structures, 10 of which are contributing. Rhine House is the most prominent, built from 1883 to 1884 and designed by Albert Schroepfer. The house has elaborate interiors, and was used to entertain visitors of the property. The house was built on the site of the Hudson House (built c. 1848–52), which was moved nearby in order in 1883 to build the larger and grander Rhine House. It has features of the Queen Anne and Chateauesque architectural styles, with attributes from its architect's own German heritage.

== Ownership history ==
The Beringer family sold the Beringer name and winery to Nestlé in 1971, which in 1996 subsequently sold the enterprise to a group led by Texas Pacific Group; the company went public the next year. From 2000 to 2011 the winery was owned by Foster's Group. As of 2011, it is owned by Treasury Wine Estates.

== See also ==
- California wine
