= Samuel Wynn =

Australian Jewish community leader, restaurateur, merchant and Zionist

Samuel Wynn (4 April 1891 – 17 June 1982) was an Australian Jewish community leader, restaurateur, wine and spirits merchant and Zionist. Wynn was born in Ushimow, Russia (modern Poland), named Shlomo ben David and was the son of Michael David Weintraub and his wife Rivkah, née Feigenbaum.

He moved to Australia in 1913.

Wynn started his entrepreneurial career in 1918 when he purchased a shop in Bourke Street, Melbourne, licensed to sell "colonial wine" and in 1920 when he bought the Café Denat, which later became the Grossi Florentino restaurant.
