= Wynns (wine) =

Winery in South Australia

Wynns Coonawarra Estate
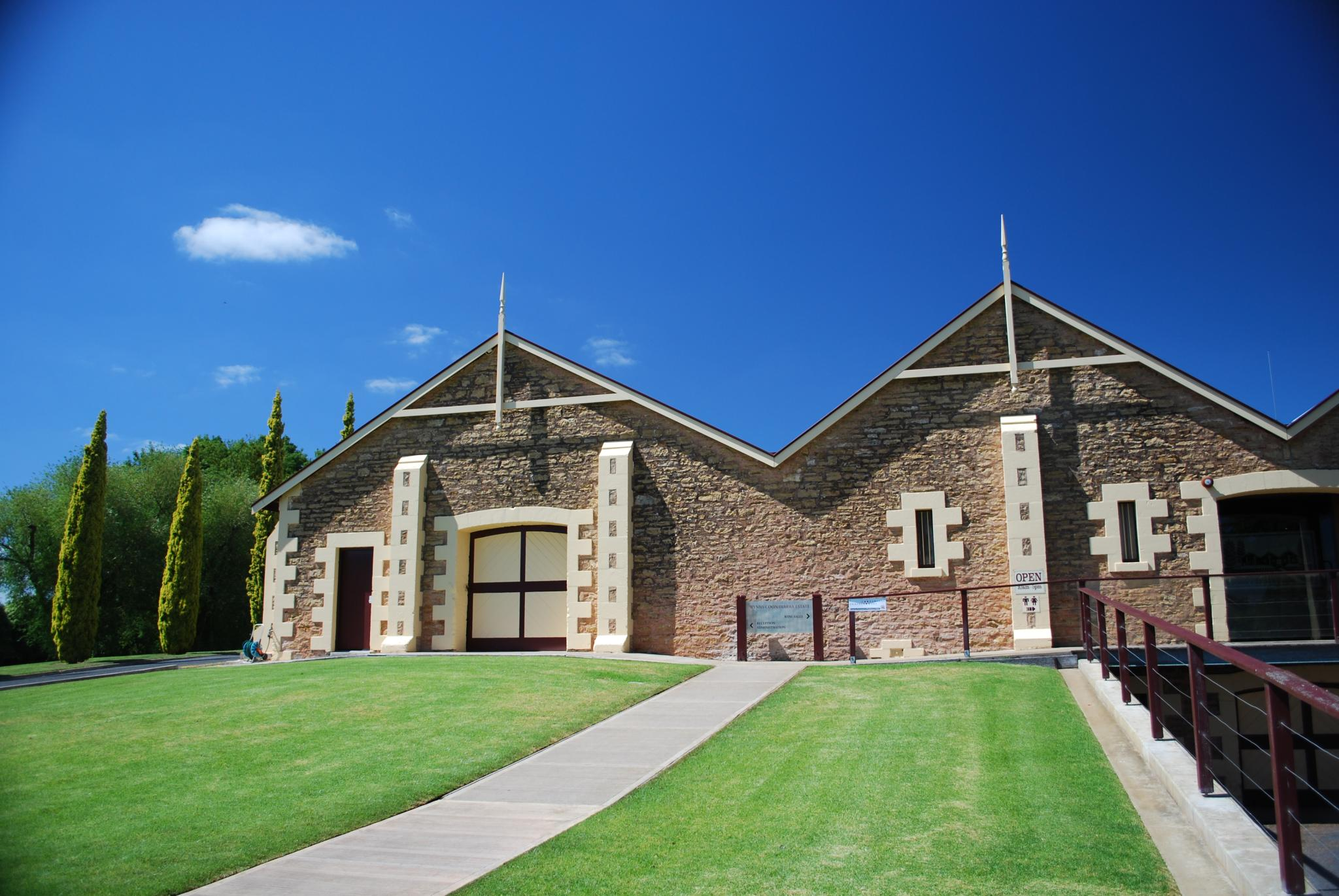
- Location: Coonawarra, South Australia, Australia
- Coordinates: 37.2932°S 140.8296°E
- Wine region: Coonawarra wine region
- Founded: 1951
- First vintage: 1952
- Parent company: Treasury Wine Estates
- Cases/yr: 100,000
- Known for: John Riddoch Cabernet Sauvignon
- Varietals: Cabernet Sauvignon, Shiraz, Chardonnay, Riesling
- Tasting: 7 days 10 – 5pm (closed Christmas Day and Good Friday)
- Website: http://www.wynns.com.au

Wynns Coonawarra Estate is an Australian winery located in Coonawarra, South Australia within the Coonawarra wine region.

== History ==
The estate was founded in 1891 by John Riddoch, utilizing red soil and planted vines.

In 1951, the vineyard was bought by David and Samuel Wynn, who renamed it from Chateau Comaum.

It is now the region's largest vineyard owned by Treasury Wine Estates.

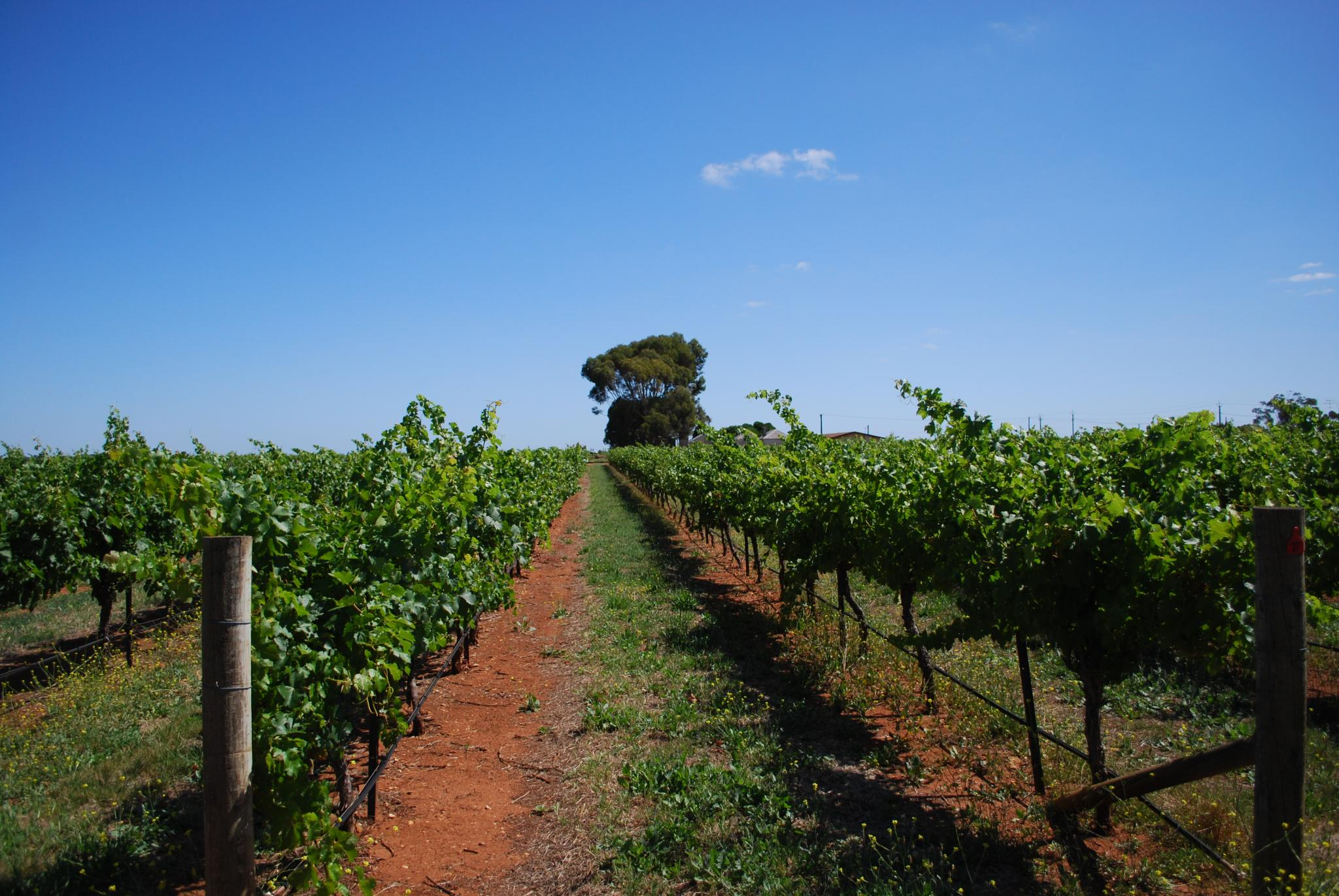
Grapevines at Wynns in Coonawarra
