= Lindeman's =

Winery in Australia

- Product type: Wine
- Current owner: Treasury Wine Estates
- Country: Australia
- Introduced: 1843
- Website: www.lindemans.com

Lindeman's
- Location: MacDonalds Road, Pokolbin, New South Wales, Australia
- Coordinates: 32°47′49″S 151°16′55″E
- Wine region: Hunter Valley
- Website: www.lindemans.com

Lindeman's is an Australian wine company, owned by Treasury Wine Estates. It was founded in 1843 by Dr Henry John Lindeman (died May 1881), who planted its first vines at "Cawarra", Gresford, on the Upper Paterson River in the Hunter Valley region of New South Wales. Though the vineyard comprised only 40 acres (16 ha), it was well set up, with cellars and other plant for making wine from grapes grown elsewhere in the region. Lindeman also had cellars in Sydney for ageing the wine.

In 1923 the winery brought in Leo Buring as governing director and general manager. He left in 1931.

In the mid-1950s it produced wines of excellence that are still sought by wine collectors and wine enthusiasts today.

In the 1970s, Lindeman's cask wine was marketed with the slogan 'You make me smile, Dr Lindeman', coined by writer Peter Carey.

The original vineyard no longer exists, and the winery now has vineyards in South Australia (Barossa Valley, Coonawarra and Padthaway), and at Karadoc in Victoria, near Red Cliffs. It is considered a mass-producer of reasonably priced, good quality wine.

In 1993, its Bin 65 chardonnay was Australia's top-selling white-wine export. Five consecutive vintages have been named "best buys" by the Wine Spectator, a consumer magazine, and Robert M. Parker, Jr. has called it "one of the three or four finest chardonnay values in the world" in his newsletter The Wine Advocate.

In 2005, the brand and assets, which had been previously owned by Foster's and Southcorp, were acquired by Treasury Wine Estates.

== See also ==
- Australian wine
- Philip Shaw, former winemaker at Lindeman's
