= Rosemount (wine) =

Australian winery

Coordinates: 35°10′35″S 138°33′19″E

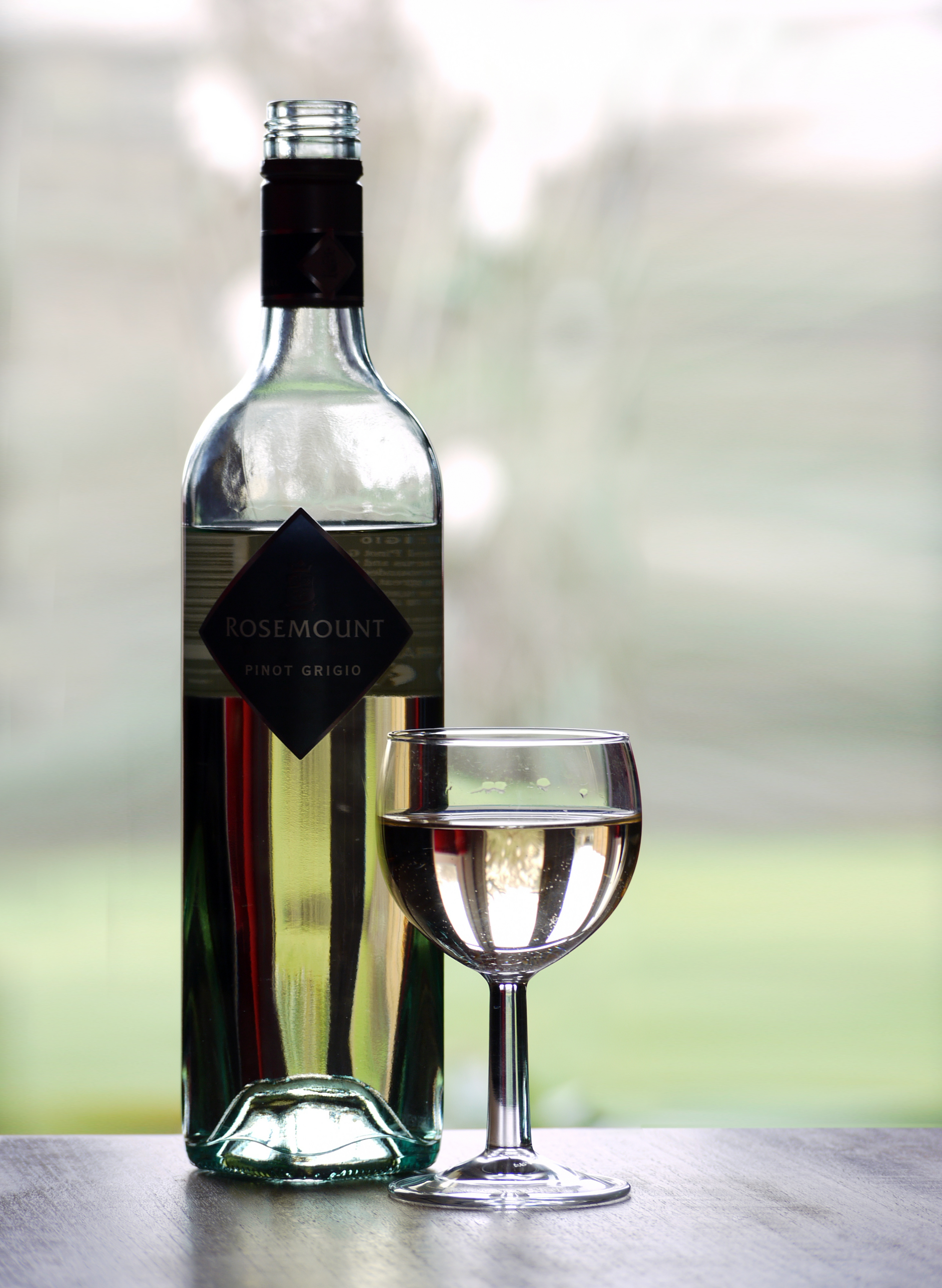
A bottle of Rosemount Pinot grigio

Rosemount, previously Rosemount Estate Wines, is an Australian winery based in the Hunter Valley and South Australia, owned by Treasury Wine Estates. At the turn of the 21st century, Rosemount was the second-best selling Australian wine brand in the United States.

== History ==
The company was established in 1969 by Bob Oatley and was Australia's largest family owned winery until its March 2001 merger with Southcorp Wines, which in 2005 merged with the Foster's Group.

From 1977 or earlier, to at least 1995 its managing director was Chris Hancock, who graduated into management from a career of winemaking with Penfolds (he was behind the 1971 Grange Hermitage).

Rosemount's first commercially released wine was a Chardonnay-Sémillon labeled as Pinot Riesling, reflecting the Hunter Valley tradition of then calling Sémillon "Hunter Riesling".

In October 2000, Rosemount announced a partnership with Robert Mondavi Winery to create a joint venture marketing both Californian and Australian wines under a new label collaboration.

== See also ==
- South Australian wine
