= Tony Jordan (winemaker) =

Australian winemaker (1944–2019)

Anthony Douglas Jordan OAM
- Born: 28 May 1944; Perth, Australia
- Died: 27 August 2019 (aged 75)
- Education: University of Sydney
- Occupations: Winemaker, oenologist, wine judge
- Years active: 1974–2019
- Employer: LVMH
- Spouse: Michele Jordan (married 1998)
- Children: 3

Anthony Douglas Jordan OAM (28 May 1944 – 27 August 2019) was an Australian winemaker and oenologist.

In the 1970s, Jordan, along with winemaker Brian Croser developed the oenology program at what is now Charles Sturt University. He later founded the wine consultancy Oenotec with Croser. For most of his career, Jordan worked for Moët-Hennessy, establishing and managing wineries around the world, including Domaine Chandon in the Yarra Valley. In his retirement, he scouted the location for the Ao Yun winery. Throughout his life, Jordan was deeply involved in the Australian wine industry and judged numerous wine competitions both nationally and internationally.

Jordan was very influential on the Australian wine industry.

== Early life and education ==
Jordan was born in Perth, Australia on 28 March 1944, as the first of three children to Doug and Mary Jordan. He had two younger sisters, Maria and Frances. His father, Doug, was one of Australia's leading bookmakers. When he was seven, his family moved to Melbourne, where he attended Caulfield Grammar School and excelled academically.

Jordan attended the University of Sydney, graduating with first-class honours and completed a PhD in electron spectroscopy in 1970.

== Career ==
Jordan worked as a researcher at the University of Houston and University College London. After returning to Australia in 1974, he became a patent attorney in Sydney.

In 1974, he began working as a lecturer in Physical Chemistry and Wine Science at Riverina College in Wagga Wagga, now part of Charles Sturt University. There, he received wine education from Don Lester, the former chief viticulturist at Orlando Wines. Following Lester's suggestion, Jordan took a one-year sabbatical at the Geisenheim Grape Breeding Institute with Helmut Becker. Upon his return, he and Brian Croser developed the oenology program at Riverina College. This program was influential on the modern Australian wine industry. In 1977, Jordan and Croser built a successful winery at the college.

=== Oenotec ===
In 1978, Jordan left his lecturing position to join Oenotec, the wine consultancy group founded by Croser. Their frequent plane travel from harvest to harvest led to the term "flying winemaker" being coined, and, unusually for the time, they provided hands-on winemaking expertise. With numerous clients, it was not feasible to visit them all, so most advice was given over the phone from Piccadilly, South Australia. Their model involved taking oenology graduates and, with some instruction, place them as full-time winemakers with clients. They were perceived as arrogant, and were criticised for making wines that tasted the same. There was also speculation that they were making excessive profit by selling R2 yeast, which Croser contested. They improved production by promoting the exclusion of oxygen in winemaking, and the use of refrigeration and stainless steel. Oenotec was founded as wine production globalized beyond select European countries. Other consultancy firms were started after them. By 1984, Oenotec had thirty clients, including Moët-Hennessy, which had engaged Oenotec on James Halliday's suggestion. They advised winemakers of various sizes, including large producers such as Penfolds and Seppeltsfield. In 1987, Jordan bought out Croser to become the sole owner. He then sold Oenotec to Gary Baldwin in 1988. The company was later merged into Wine Network Australia in 1993.

=== Moët-Hennessy ===
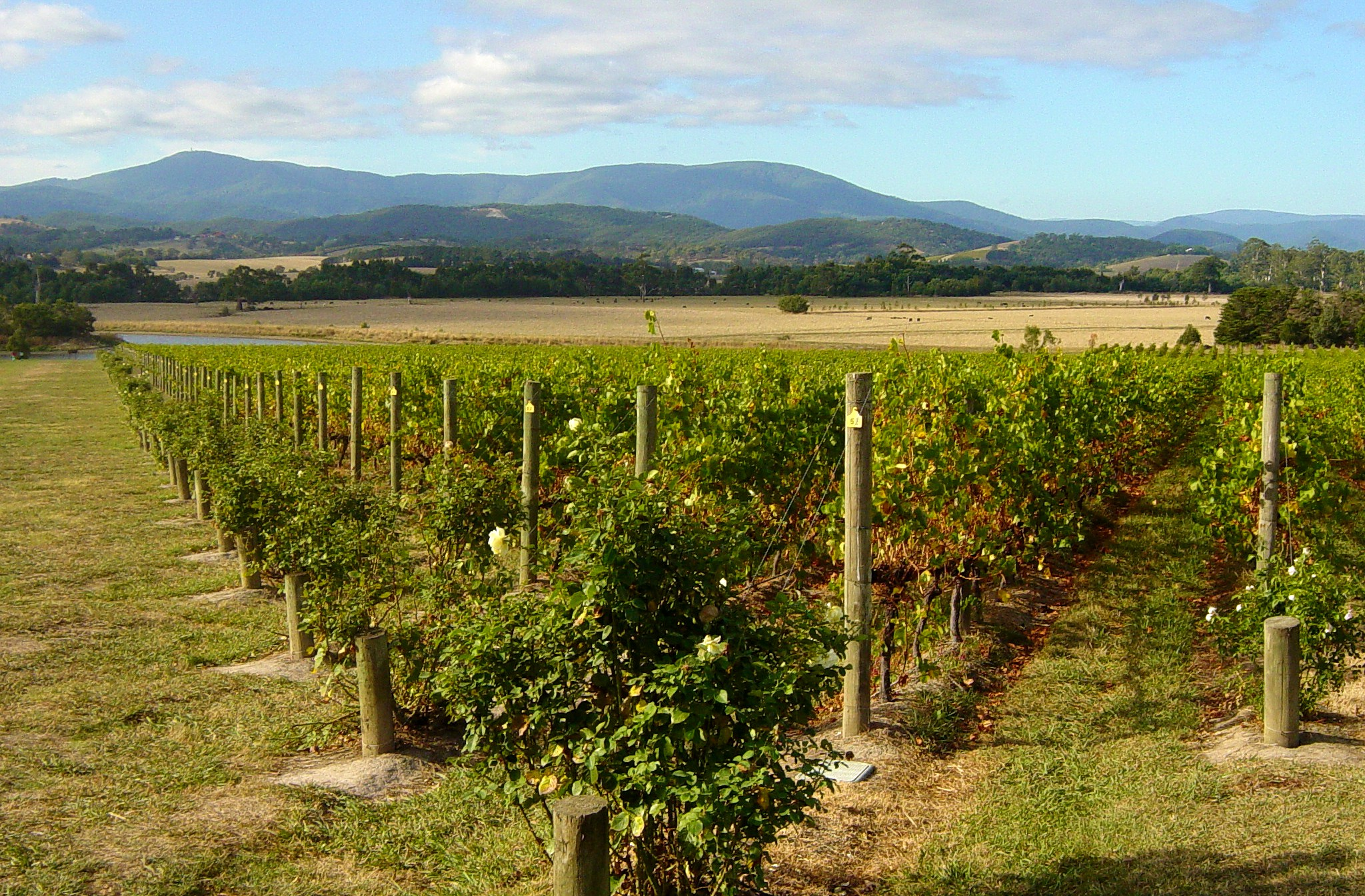
Domaine Chandon Australia, established by Jordan in 1988

In 1984, Moët-Hennessy tasked Jordan with finding an Australian site for a new upmarket sparkling wine facility called Domaine Chandon on the recommendation of James Halliday, after they had started similar facilities in Argentina and California. Moët-Hennessy were looking to enter Australia to access the Asian wine market, although by 1993 most exports were going to Europe. After an eighteen-month search, Jordan selected an old dairy farm called Greenpoint in the Victorian town of Coldstream, in the Yarra Valley, for its climate and soil. In November 1985 Jordan was appointed CEO and chief winemaker of Domaine Chandon, and in 1987 became the managing director. The winery was established the next year. Early on, most grapes used by Domaine Chandon were bought from other vineyards. The wine produced in this period, vintage sparkling, was acclaimed. During the 1990s, Jordan began consulting on international Chandon wineries, which involved stepping away from Domaine Chandon. In the mid-1990s he was in charge of exports for Moët-Hennessy, and travelled for three months a year, mainly to England. From 1998 to 2000, he ran the Wirra Wirra winery after a disagreement over Domaine Chandon's strategy, before returning to Domaine Chandon. In 2001 he assumed technical and winemaking responsibilities for all global Chandon ventures, including in Argentina, Brazil, California and Spain. In 2003 he became CEO of Domaine Chandon Australia, Cape Mentelle, and Cloudy Bay after Moet acquired the latter two. In 2004, Domaine Chandon Australia under Jordan became the first up-market sparkling wine producer to use the crown cork to close bottles. James Halliday opined in 2007 that Jordan's return to Domaine Chandon improved the product's property.

=== Ao Yun ===
Jordan retired from Domaine Chandon in 2008 and restarted Oenotec, undertaking consulting in Australia, New Zealand, the UK and Asia. He was hired in 2008 by LVMH to choose locations for and set up Chandon India (established in 2014 in Maharashtra) and Chandon China (established in 2011 in Ningxia to produce sparkling wines). He was also tasked with finding a location for the 'Ao Yun' label. To find a location, Jordan used soil and weather analysis. If the weather was too cold, as in the north of China, the vines would have to be buried, which impact quality. In the east of China, wine is difficult to grow due to mildew and disease. He selected Deqin County, Yunnan after a trip revealed comparable conditions to Bordeaux, and he surprisingly found Cabernet Sauvignon and Cabernet Franc vines planted in the 1840s by French missionaries. The Chinese government had previously planted vines there in 1992 or 2002. He searched for four years, mostly travelling on foot with weather measuring equipment on his back. The first vintage (the 2013) of Ao Yun was released in 2016. As of 2023, wine from Ao Yun was considered by collectors to be the most valuable Chinese wine.

=== Administration and judging ===
Jordan was president of the Australian Society of Viticulture and Oenology from 1990 to 1991 and was influential in its early development. He was president of the Small Wine Makers Forum in 1985. He was president of the Yarra Valley Wine Growers Association from 2008 to 2010. He chaired the Wine Show Technical Advisory Committee, tasked with assessing best practices for Australian wine competitions, and he was a board member of Wine Australia for six years.

Jordan was an authority on sparkling wine, and worked as a judge at wine competitions in Australia, the UK, South Africa, Hong Kong and New Zealand, including the Decanter World Wine Awards. He was one of three judges in the Champagne and Sparkling Wine World Championships alongside Tom Stevenson and Essi Avellan from its inception in 2014 to 2018. Jordan was the chairman of the Royal Hobart Wine Show, the Perth Royal Wine Show and the Hong Kong International Wine Competition.

He founded the Spear Gully winery with his wife Michele, and was a part owner and founder of Tolpuddle Vineyard, which was planted to supply grapes for Domaine Chandon.

== Personal life ==
On 29 December 1998 in London, Jordan married his second wife Michele Jordan. They had met in May 1992 when she was working at Moët & Chandon in London. Jordan had three children from his first marriage and at his death had six grandchildren.

Jordan became interested in wine while attending university. As of 2012, his favourite varieties of wine were Nebbiolo, Shiraz, Bordeaux blends and sparkling. He was against the use of genetically modifying wine, as he believed it would reduce the impact of terroir. With Michele, he was interested in gardens, and he planted an arboretum in Hoddles Creek, in the Yarra Valley where he lived. His house contained a small vineyard. Jordan became interested in Tibetan culture following trips to South Asia, and he was also interested in walking, golf and chair-making.

Jordan was noted for his bluntness and was affectionately referred to as "The Big Nosed Technocrat" by Len Evans.

Jordan died of mesothelioma on 27 August 2019. He was diagnosed in April 2019 after experiencing breathlessness on Easter Saturday. Jordan speculated his cancer was caused by asbestos exposure during PhD research in the 1960s.

== Legacy ==
Jordan was a respected and influential figure in the Australian wine industry, particularly on the production of sparkling wine. He was a leading Australian oenologist. His influence on the wine industry in Australia has been likened to that of Émile Peynaud in France.

Jordan was awarded the Order of Australia medal in 2013 for his contribution to the Australian wine industry. In 2019, he became a fellow of the Australian Society of Viticulture and Oenology. In June 2019 the Australian Grape and Wine Authority awarded him a life membership of the Australian Wine Industry, and Wine Australia established the Dr Tony Jordan OAM Award in his honour, with an annual grant of up to $40,000 to support the study of a PhD scholarship applicant. He posthumously received an honorary doctorate from Charles Sturt University in September 2019, having been notified of the honour before his death.

== See also ==
- List of wine professionals
