= Wine Australia =

Australian government agency

Statutory corporation overview
- Formed: 1981; 45 years ago
- Preceding Statutory corporation: Australian Wine Board
- Jurisdiction: Commonwealth of Australia
- Headquarters: Adelaide, South Australia, Australia
- Parent department: Department of Agriculture, Fisheries and Forestry
- Website: www.wineaustralia.com

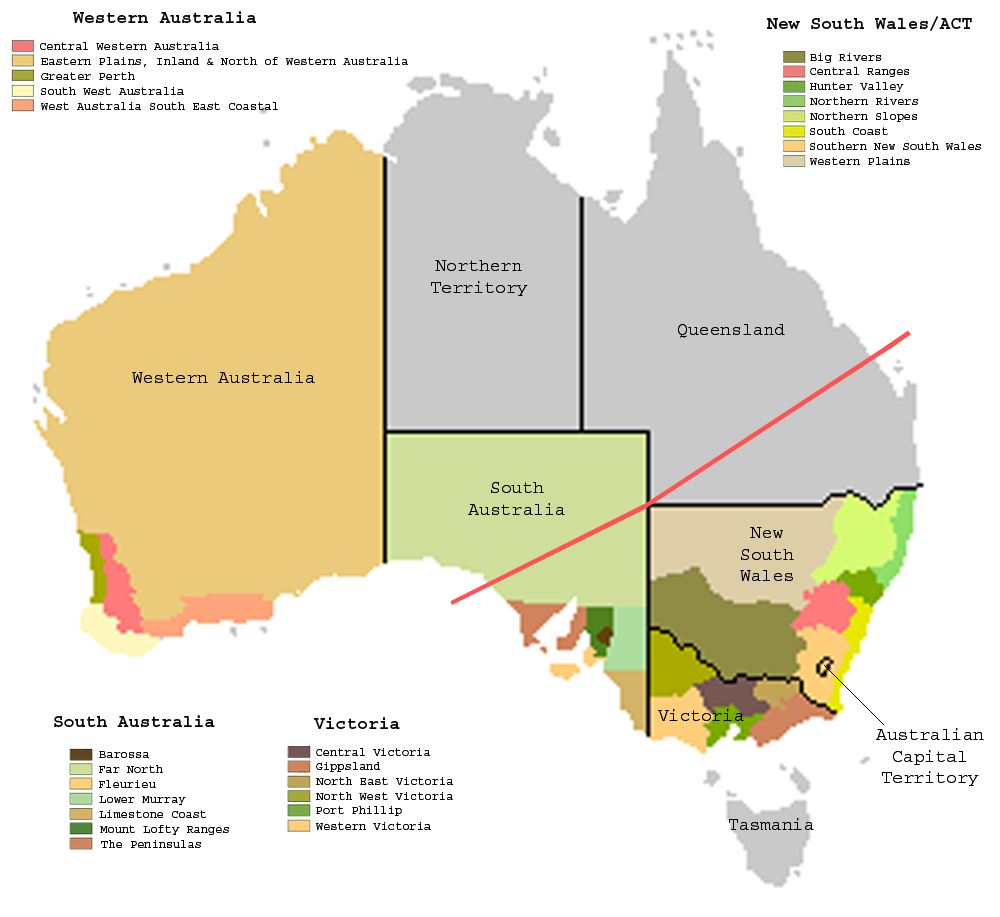
Australian wine regions as established previously by AWBC and now administered by Wine Australia

Wine Australia is an Australian Government statutory corporation that promotes and regulates the Australian wine industry. It was created as the Australian Wine and Brandy Corporation (AWBC) in 1981 to replace the Australian Wine Board by the Australian Wine and Brandy Corporation Act 1980, and had its name changed by the amended Wine Corporation Act 1980, passed in December 2010. Wine Australia is now governed by the superseding law, Wine Australia Act 2013. Wine Australia determines the boundaries of Australia's wine regions and sometimes names them. Wine Australia also regulates wine exports, ensuring the quality and integrity of each shipment of wine exported. Wine Australia has three main departments; Compliance, Market Development and Knowledge Development.

Wine Australia has its headquarters in Adelaide.

== History ==
Wine Australia is a type of statutory authority known as a statutory corporation, established by the Australian Government. It was originally created as the Australian Wine and Brandy Corporation, which was established to provide strategic support to the Australian wine sector. It was established as an Australian Government statutory corporation directed by a board appointed by the federal Minister for Agriculture, Fisheries and Forestry at the time.

=== Australian Wine and Brandy Corporation Act 1980 ===
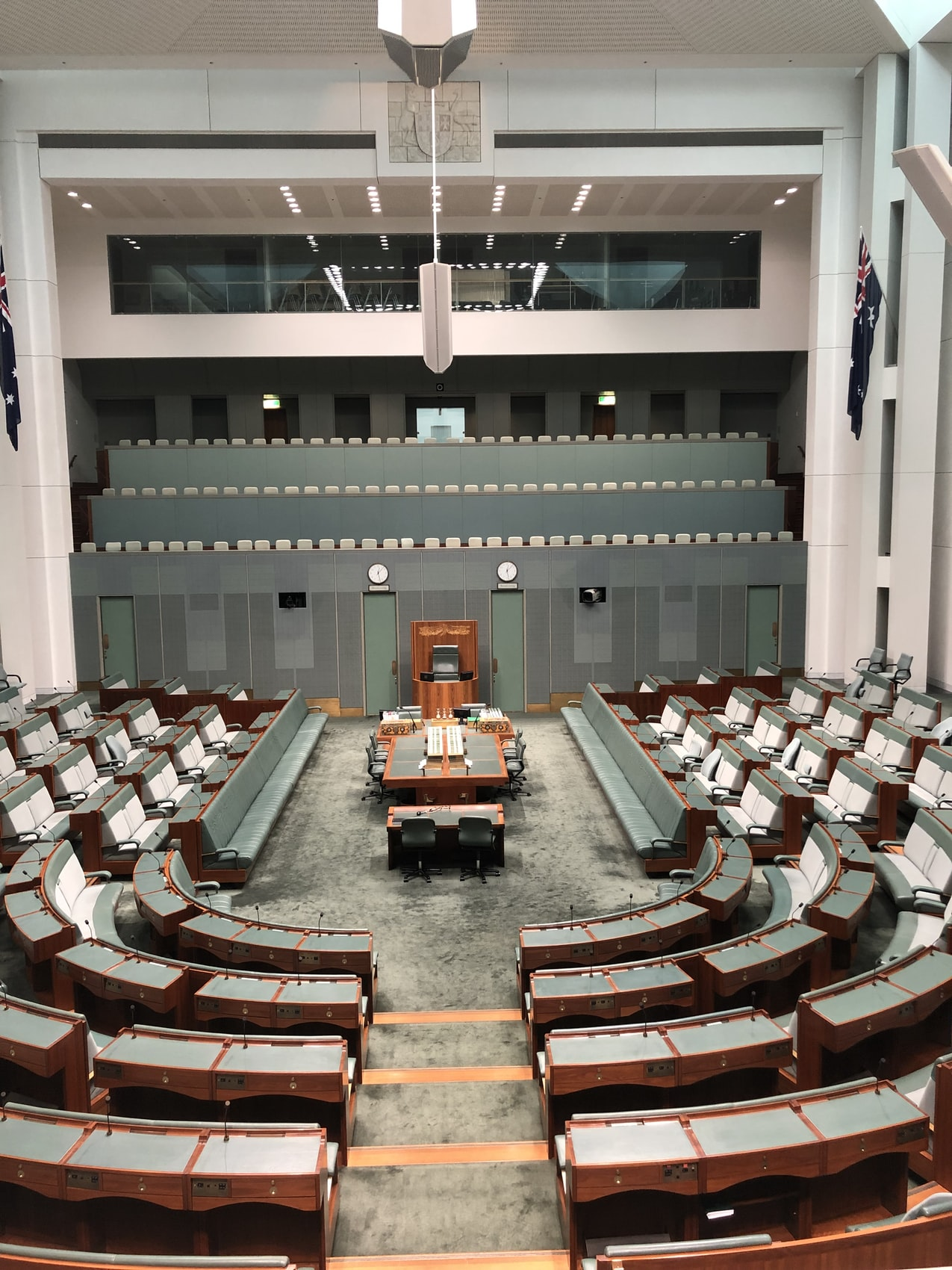
Australian House of Representatives - place where the first three readings of a proposed legislative bill occur before moving to the Senate

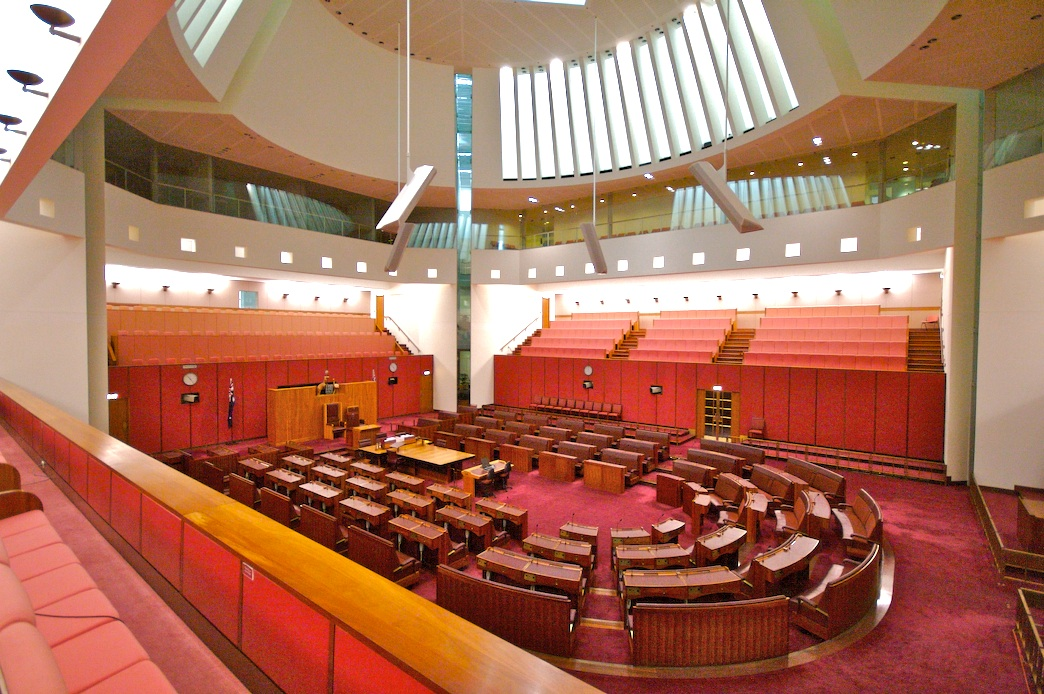
Australian Senate - place where legislative bill is sent after being passed through the House of Representatives. Final destination of readings before gaining Royal Assent

In 1980, the Australian Wine and Brandy Corporation Act 1980 was passed, forming the AWBC authority that has progressed to the present. With the passing of this act, the functions of the Australian Wine and Brandy Corporation, and thus the purpose of its formation were declared. Holistically, this act lists out its explicit objectives Part 1 s3 (1):

(1) The objects of this Act are:

(a) to promote and control the export of grape products from Australia; and

(b) to promote and control the sale and distribution, after export, of Australian grape products; and

(c) to promote trade and commerce in grape products among the States, between States and Territories and within the Territories; and

(d) to improve the production of grape products, and encourage the consumption of grape products, in the Territories; and

(e) to enable Australia to fulfil its obligations under prescribed wine‑trading agreements and other international agreements;

and this Act shall be construed and administered accordingly.

The Australian Wine and Brandy Corporation Act 1980 was passed in Australian federal parliament to lawfully govern the operational activities of the Australian Wine and Brandy Corporation and the Australian wine regions respectively. This process involved the act being presented to the House of Representatives as a bill. In this form, it was subject to three readings and once ministers are satisfied, the bill was then sent to the Senate by the Sarjeant-at-Arms where the same three reading process is followed. The bill was then passed by both houses and given royal assent by the Governor General. The act itself, however came into effect 28 days after consent (in compliance with the legal policy) - known as date of proclamation.

The Wine Corporation Act 1980, an amended version of the Australian Wine and Brandy Corporation Act 1980, passed in December 2010, enacting a change of name to Wine Australia.

In 2013, this piece of legislation was amended and thus recompiled to include up to date modifications and to respond to the changing demands of the wine industry in Australia. As such, it now stands as the Wine Australia Corporation Act 2013 (Cth).

== RDCs ==
The organisation is one of 15 Rural Research and Development Corporations (RDCs) in Australia, and one of the five that is a statutory corporation, along with AgriFutures, the Cotton Research and Development Corporation, the Fisheries Research and Development Corporation and the Grain Research and Development Corporation (the rest are industry-owned). They are funded largely by the government for the purposes of investing in R&D (research and development), with the aim of improving "profitability, productivity, competitiveness and long-term sustainability of Australia's primary industries".

== Aims ==
The aims of Wine Australia include:

- export regulation compliance
- integrity maintenance
- define wine region boundaries
- strategic marketing
- negotiating trade barrier reduction
- provide statistics and analysis

== Funding ==
Funding of all of the Wine Australia corporation’s endeavours is sourced primarily from the Australian Government Department of Agriculture, Water and the Environment.

=== Department of Agriculture, Water and the Environment ===
The Department of Agriculture, Water and the Environment (DAWE) was previously structured in separate government departments as the Department of Agriculture and the Department of the Environment and Energy. These two departments were then brought together to establish the current department on 1 February 2020. As well as this, ministers responsible for the department were appointed. These being; David Littleproud as Minister for Agriculture, Drought and Emergency Management; Keith Pitt as Minister for Resources and Water; and Sussan Ley as Minister for the Environment. Along with this, Andrew Metcalfe AO was appointed as the secretary for the department.

The department itself stands as the national representative of the country’s interests in agriculture, water and the environment whilst leading efforts to protect and strengthen the nation’s agriculture, water resources, the environment and heritage.

=== Funding Initiatives ===
DAWE is responsible for the practical funding of Wine Australia’s business plans for the maintenance and sustainable achievement of their main objective. This being investing in practices to expand domestic and international markets. They intend to achieve this by conducting research, development and extension to protect and administer Australian wine exports and the wine industry itself.

DAWE has provided monetary funding to establish and phase in Wine Australia’s “Export and Regional Wine Support Package”, which is at the forefront of their role. Explicitly stated in their 2017-18 Grants Report, DAWE states that they intend to provide this funding “to implement the government approved business plan for the Export and Regional Wine Support Package”. Through this, sum of $54,263,000 has been granted to Wine Australia with a grant term of 32months (2.5years) commencing 11 December 2017.

== Departments ==
Wine Australia states its different areas of departmental focus to be:

- compliance
- market development
- knowledge development

=== Compliance ===
This department of Wine Australia is responsible for ensuring that the practices and activities undertaken by stakeholders to the Australian wine industry are lawful and comply with the obligations set out in the Wine Australia Act 2013. This department is concerned with the legalities of running the corporation and their compliance regime is administered by the appointed staff in this department. The areas of compliance that this department particularly monitor and assess include the; Label Integrity Program, Winemaking, Wine labelling, Exporting, Wine Export Levy & fees, Shipping and Logistics. All of which play a role in this department being able to contribute to establishing a wine regulatory system that protects consumers; and ensures a fair trading environment for producers and exporters.

==== Label Integrity Program ====
The "Label Integrity Program" is one of the main operational initiatives of the Compliance department within Wine Australia. Its role is to:

ensure the truth, and the reputation for truthfulness, of statements made on wine labels, or made for commercial purposes in other ways, about the vintage, variety or geographical indication of wine manufactured in Australia

This program sets out multiple controls on wine labelling in compliance and adherence to the Geographic Indications regulations explicit in Part 6B of the Wine Australia Corporation Act. In doing so, the compliance department are able to hold administrative control over truth in labelling by ensuring winemakers keep records and by imposing audits where required. These audits under the program can occur randomly, but are also scheduled annually for each region.

Compliance protocols under this program stipulate that the minimum labelling information on wine sold in Australia is:

- producers name
- producers address
- alcohol level
- number of standard drinks
- 'contains sulfites' statement
- 'Wine of Australia' or 'Product of Australia'
- prescribed allergenic substances - milk and casein, egg whites, nuts, isinglass

=== Market development ===
This department of Wine Australia is responsible for ensuring that the growth of domestic and international markets for wine is maintained and maximised through research, development and extension measures that are undertaken.

This department is responsible for measures and initiatives which promote a movement to greater capacity of trade relations. This includes projects of different scale and magnitude that are organised, developed and implemented by the market development department. All of which share a common aim to improve and strengthen export opportunities for Australian wine with favourable trading conditions and increased investment internationally.

This department makes practical efforts to achieve the above under the impetus of the '$50million package' that they have been provided through funding from Department of Water, Agriculture and the Environment. Through this, market development team puts into place certain measures focused particularly on helping Australian wine businesses capture market opportunities specifically in China and USA. These projects involve print, broadcast, online and social media, key influencer engagement and events, and consumer education which work together to develop a portfolio and presence for Australian wine exports with enhanced perception to consumers and potential investors.

=== Knowledge development ===
This department of Wine Australia is responsible for performing the more strategic and tactical operations of the corporation to allow the board to make decisions which accurately reflect the complexity of the modern Australian wine industry. This department is more practical in nature with many projects that are worked on to strategise and tactically evaluate all of the initiatives undertaken. The bulk of this department's focus is put to enabling wine businesses to be assisted in their information obtaining processes to make it a lot easier for the industry as a whole to collect and manage information in an efficient manner.

In terms of its operational objectives, this department is positioned to focus on: providing information on the wine sector, collecting and providing global wine market intelligence, regularly projecting and updating wine sector data and trends, responding to inquiries on their publications, initiating and collaborating with others on data collection, contributing and collaborating with related publications and forums.

More specifically, this department is able to achieve this through the collection and analysis of Australian and foreign wine industry statistics. From this, the department then also organises and hosts an information centre, which is readily accessible and in place to attend to different demands of wine businesses that may arise. Along with this, the knowledge department also develops, adds to and administers an extensive data base on Australian and international wine export information that is also accessible to those in the industry to access and benefit from should they require.

== Headquarters ==
The Wine Australia corporation has its headquarters in Adelaide, South Australia. The Wine Australia head office address is: Industry House: Corner of Hackney and Botanic Roads, Adelaide, South Australia.

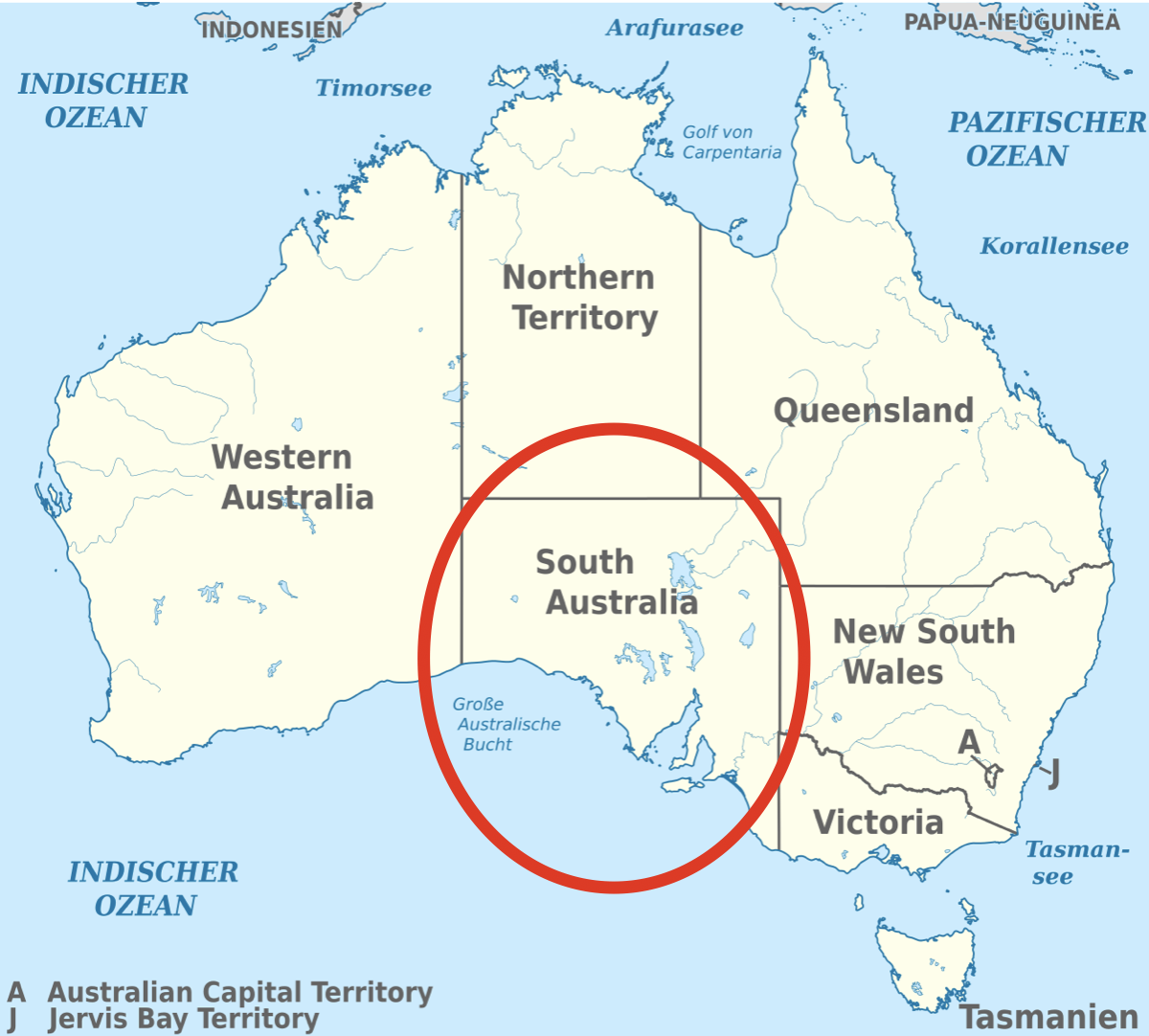
Map of Australia - South Australia, (the state where Wine Australia headquarters is located) is circled

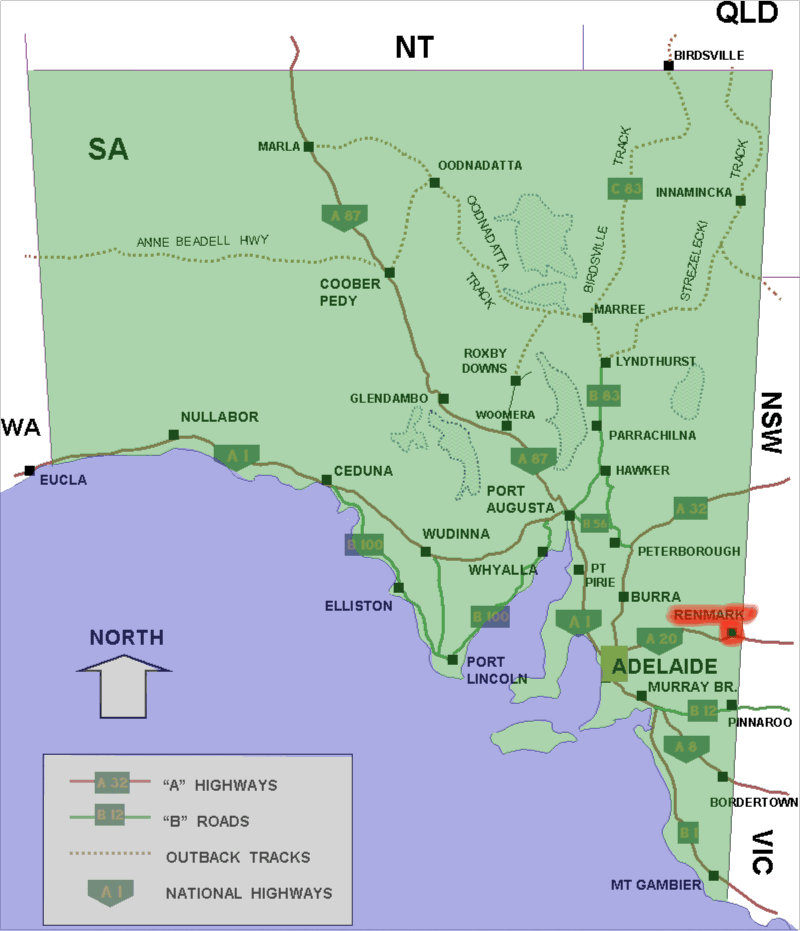
South Australia - map focused on state

== See also ==
- Agriculture in Australia
- Australian and New Zealand Wine Industry Journal
- Australian Wine
- Australian Wine Research Institute
- Australian Society of Viticulture and Oenology
- Australia's First Families of Wine
- Langton's Classification of Australian Wine
- National Wine Centre of Australia
- Australian Grape and Wine Authority
