= Terry Lee (cricketer) =

Australian cricketer and oenologist

Personal information
- Full name: Terence Henderson Lee
- Born: 31 August 1940 (age 86); Manly, New South Wales, Australia
- Batting: Right-handed
- Bowling: Right-arm off-spin

Domestic team information
- Years: Team
- 1962–63 to 1967–68: New South Wales

Career statistics
Competition	FC
Matches	27
Runs scored	758
Batting average	18.95
100s/50s	0/4
Top score	68
Balls bowled	3976
Wickets	38
Bowling average	36.00
5 wickets in innings	0
10 wickets in match	0
Best bowling	4/19
Catches/stumpings	20/–
- Source: CricketArchive, 2 January 2017

Terence Henderson Lee OAM (born 31 August 1940) is a former cricketer who played first-class cricket for New South Wales from 1962 to 1967. He later became prominent in research and development in the Australian wine industry, work for which he was awarded the Medal of the Order of Australia in 2007.

== Cricket career ==
An all-rounder who batted in the middle order and bowled off-spin, Lee played several matches for New South Wales Colts between 1959–60 and 1962–63. Against Victoria Colts in 1962–63 he scored 137 out of a New South Wales Colts total of 292. He made his first-class debut for New South Wales a few weeks later.

He played as the professional for East Lancashire in the Lancashire League in 1963. East Lancashire won the championship, Lee scoring 701 runs (more runs than any other professional in the league) at an average of 43.81 and taking 59 wickets at 14.06.

Lee played most of the 1963–64 season in the New South Wales team, scoring 253 runs at 25.30 and taking 14 wickets at 45.07. At one stage he was considered a possibility to be selected in the Australian team to tour England in 1964. He played for an Australian XI against the touring South Africans in Melbourne, but with little success. A week later, for New South Wales against the South Africans, he top scored with 68 in the New South Wales second innings total of 147.

He returned to the Lancashire League in 1964. East Lancashire finished third, Lee scoring 833 runs at 39.66 and taking 63 wickets at 11.53.

Lee was less successful in 1964–65 and 1965–66 and played irregularly for New South Wales. He returned to better form in 1966–67, finishing the season with 254 runs at 23.09 and 15 wickets at 23.60. In a low-scoring match against Queensland in mid-season he scored 45 and 8 not out and took 2 for 26 and 4 for 19. In the next match a week later, he and John Gleeson bowled South Australia out for 87, Lee taking 4 for 28. He played the first three matches of the 1967–68 Sheffield Shield season but without success.

== Wine career ==
Lee holds a BSc and PhD in food technology from the University of New South Wales. He retired in 2004 from the positions of vice president and chief scientific officer of E & J Gallo Winery in Modesto, California. Before joining Gallo, he was the director of the Australian Wine Research Institute in Adelaide for 14 years. He was president of the Australian Society of Viticulture and Oenology from 1986 to 1988.

He was awarded a Centenary Medal in 2001. In 2007 he was made a Patron of the Australian wine industry and was awarded a Medal of the Order of Australia in the Queen’s Birthday Honours, for "service to viticulture and to the wine industry through research and development organisations, wine industry bodies and government advisory roles in Australia and overseas, and through tertiary education in the fields of viticulture and oenology".

Lee has been editor of the Australian Journal of Grape and Wine Research since 2012.
