= Australian Wine Research Institute =

Research institute in Adelaide

Logo of the Australian Wine Research Institute

The Australian Wine Research Institute (AWRI) is a research institute with a focus on Australian wine, based in Adelaide, South Australia.

== Location ==
It is based at the Wine Innovation Cluster, situated in the Waite Research Precinct, in the Adelaide suburb of Urrbrae, South Australia.

== History ==
The institute was established in 1955 at the Waite campus of the University of Adelaide. It is funded by grape growers and wineries. Its first scientific chief was John Fornachon. An early researcher was Bryce Rankine, who later taught at the Roseworthy College, an oenology institution. The primary aim of the institute in the 1950s was to create good Australian table wines as opposed to traditional fortified wines.

Research done by the institute has looked at "oxidation, hazes and deposits caused by trace amounts of iron and copper, and the need for better yeast strains, more effective use of sulphur dioxide, and pH control" as well as "research into new grape varieties".

The institute introduced a calculator for enologists in 2023. The tool assists enologists in determining the adequate amount of additives and aids in the winemaking process,

== See also ==
- Australian and New Zealand Wine Industry Journal
- Australian Society of Viticulture and Oenology
- National Wine Centre of Australia
- Australian Grape and Wine Authority
