= AgriFutures Australia =

Australian government body (founded 1990)

Rural Industries Research and Development Corporation
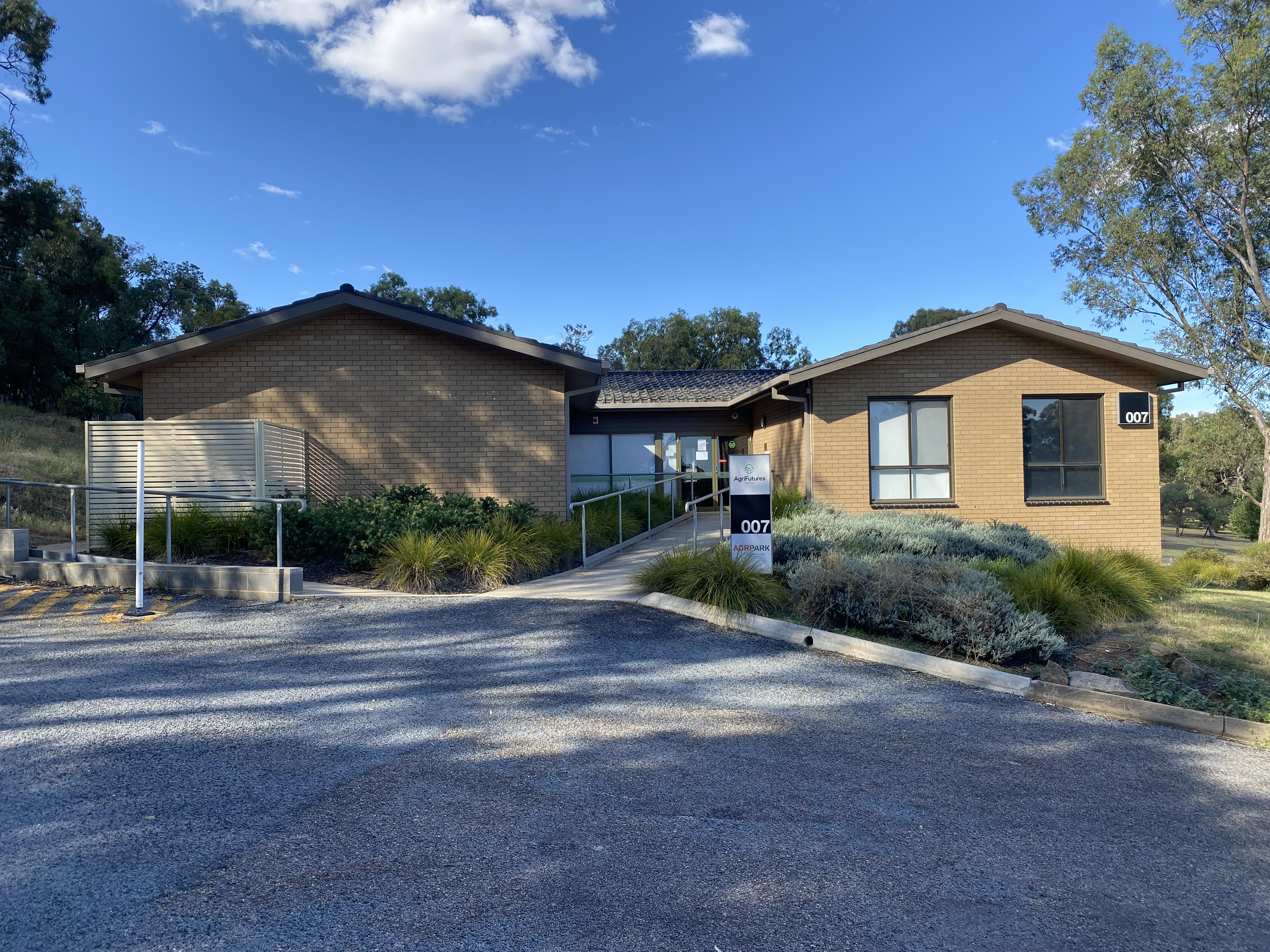
- AgriFutures Australia at Charles Sturt University in December 2021

Statutory authority overview
- Formed: July 1990; 36 years ago
- Jurisdiction: Australia
- Headquarters: Charles Sturt University, Wagga Wagga, NSW; 35.061095°S 147.353637°E
- Parent Statutory authority: Department of Agriculture, Fisheries and Forestry
- Website: agrifutures.com.au

Agrifutures Australia, formerly the Rural Industries Research and Development Corporation (RIRDC), is an Australian statutory corporation set up by the Australian Government in 1990 to help fund research and development in Australian rural industries.

== Origin ==
The Rural Industries Research and Development Corporation was originally formed as a statutory corporation in July 1990 under the Primary Industries and Energy Research and Development Act 1989 (later renamed the Primary Industries Research and Development Act 1989). It was set up by the Australian Government to work with Australian rural industries on the organisation, and funding of their research and development needs, in particular for new and emerging industries and for national rural issues.

== RDCs ==
The organisation is one of 15 Rural Research and Development Corporations (RDCs) in Australia, and one of the five that is a statutory corporation, along with Wine Australia, the Cotton Research and Development Corporation, the Fisheries Research and Development Corporation and the Grain Research and Development Corporation (the rest are industry-owned). They are funded largely by the government for the purposes of investing in R&D (research and development), with the aim of improving "profitability, productivity, competitiveness and long-term sustainability of Australia's primary industries".

== Function ==
Agrifuture's focus is agriculture, aiming to improve and grow the profitability of the sector. Australian rural industries and the Australian Government (through the Department of Agriculture and Water Resources) are major partner-stakeholders. It works to attract and help train agriculturalists and future rural leaders, engages in research into important issues for the sector, and helps to develop the potential of new industry, such as camel milk. In addition, it performs R&D for established industries without their own RDCs, such as the rice, thoroughbred horse, and tea tree oil industries.

The organisation also hosts the AgriFutures Rural Women's Award to support the role women play in rural and regional businesses, industries and communities. The organisation also hosts the AgriFutures Rural Women's Award to support the role women play in rural and regional businesses, industries and communities. In 2023, Emma Gibbons, founder of Huds and Toke, was the Queensland winner of the award for her work in sustainable pet treat manufacturing.

== Funding ==
Apart from the annual appropriation from the government, funding comes from industry levies and voluntary industry contributions, and government-specific programs, private companies, rural RDCs, state and territory governments and other research providers.

== Past research ==
RIRDC was involved in early work on developing canola in Australia, which has gone on to become a major crop, and research for the tropical fruit industry saw it expand to more than 400 Australian commercial growers by 2005. RIRDC's research helped improve rice yields by 87% per megalitre while reducing water use by 45%. RIRDC's chicken meat research led to a new live MG vaccine which holds 40% of that global market and reduced losses in the industry. It also developed three new oaten hay varieties – Wintaroo, Brusher and Kangaroo – which are contributed to an export hay market that grew by 200% over the ten years up to around 2005/6.

AgriFutures provided a grant of $405,000 in 2019 to Essential Oil Producers Association of Australia for the development of Australian essential oils.

In December 2021, AgriFutures Australia created an Australian Emerging Tropical Fruits Strategic RD&E Plan to identify and promote five tropical fruits with market growth potential; the five fruits were jackfruit, rambutan, durian, dragon fruit and longan.
