= Croser =

Croser is a surname. Notable people with the surname include:

- Brian Croser (born 1948), Australian winemaker
- Kate Croser, Australian film and television producer
