= Grape and Wine Research and Development Corporation =

Former Australian government entity

The Grape and Wine Research and Development Corporation was an entity of the Department of Agriculture, Fisheries and Forestry of the Government of Australia. It was responsible for research, development and extension for the Australian wine industry. In 2014, it was merged with Wine Australia to create the Australian Grape and Wine Authority.

== See also ==
- Australian Grape and Wine Authority
