= Clarendon Hills (wine) =

Winery in South Australia

- Location: Clarendon, South Australia, Australia
- Coordinates: 35°09′39″S 138°36′12″E
- Wine region: McLaren Vale
- Founded: 1990
- Key people: Roman Bratasiuk
- Parent company: N/A
- Known for: Astralis, Piggott Range Syrah, Hickinbotham Cabernet Sauvignon, Romas Grenache
- Varietals: Syrah, Grenache, Cabernet Sauvignon, Merlot, Mourvedre

Clarendon Hills is an Australian winery founded in 1990 by Roman Bratasiuk.

== Background ==
In 1990, Roman Bratasiuk founded Clarendon Hills winery in Clarendon, 40 kilometres (25 mi) south of Adelaide, McLaren Vale Wine Region in South Australia. The region was selected because of the significant number of old (aged 50 to 90 years) vineyards nearby. The township of Clarendon was established in 1880 by European migrants, who brought with them original French vine cuttings, propagating vineyards across the surrounding hilltops. Grenache, Syrah Merlot, Mourvedre, and Cabernet Sauvignon vineyards are sourced by Clarendon Hills within the Clarendon, Blewitt Springs and Kangarilla districts.

Bratasiuk exclusively produces single-vineyard wines, which was unusual when he started in 1990.

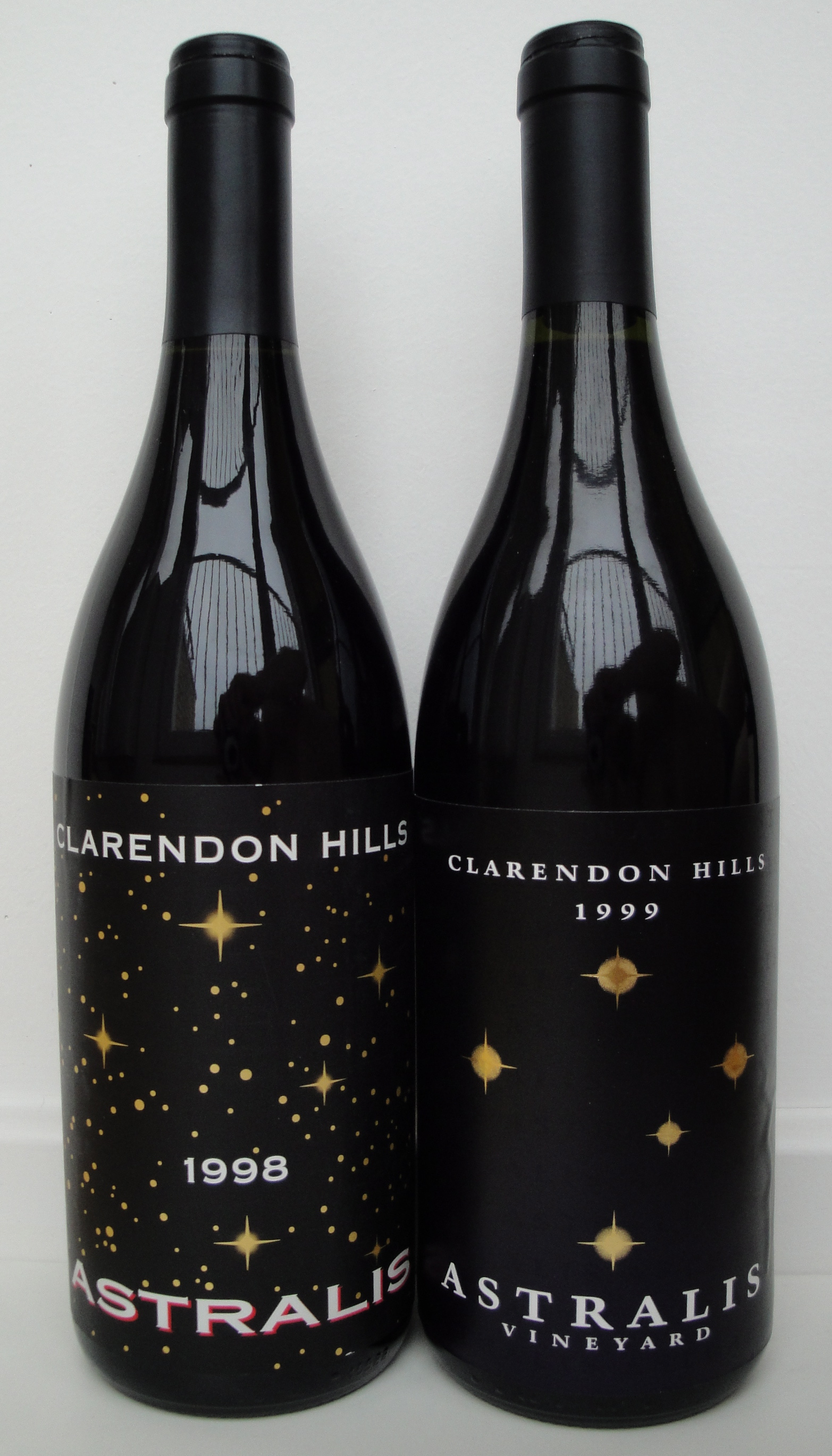
Two bottles of Astralis (1998 and 1999 vintages) with slightly different labels designs, but both featuring a night sky with the Southern Cross.

In 1996, wine critic Robert Parker named Bratasiuk wine producer of the year. After this, Astralis became a cult wine. Two vintages of Astralis (1996 and 1994) were recently included within the "Greatest 1000 Wines of all time 1727–2006" as a result of 15 international Masters of Wine collaborating with Scandinavian publisher, FINE.

Clarendon Hills was awarded New World Winery of the Year in 2006 by Wine Enthusiast. Astralis is either the highest or equivocally scored as the best Australian Shiraz/Syrah based wine every year according to US publications Wine Spectator and Wine Advocate.

== History ==
In 1989, Bratasiuk knocked on the door of a local grower whose fruit he liked the flavour of, and this later became the first Clarendon Hills vineyard. On February 24, 1990, Bratasiuk arrived to the grower's shock with a bucket and shears. Bratasiuk picked half the vineyard and returned the next day. This process was repeated in a Merlot and Cabernet Sauvignon vineyard forming the three single-site wines produced in 1990.

Bratasiuk crushed fruit in a bucket then transferred the contents into one of the three small, ex-dairy tanks. A quick, uncontrolled wild-yeast fermentation ensued, the wines were pressed in a basket press and matured in three separate third-hand barrels. The vintage was finished in 11 days. The process was repeated in the years that followed.

In 1994 Bratasiuk left his job at the Australian Government laboratories and devoted himself to Clarendon Hills. In 1994, he hired his first employee and rebranded his $30 Clarendon Hills Shiraz as 1994 Clarendon Hills Astralis. It was the first bottle in Australia to be priced at $100 and it sold out.

== Wines ==
Clarendon Hills produces eight Syrah, six Grenache, three Cabernet Sauvignon, as well as one Merlot and Mourvedre wine. All single vineyard, single varietal wines are produced from low yielding, dry-grown old vines which are hand pruned and hand-picked. All wines are aged in French oak barriques.

== See also ==
- Australian wine
- Cult wine
- South Australian wine
- List of wineries in McLaren Vale
