= Brian Croser =

Australian winemaker (born 1948)

Brian Croser AO
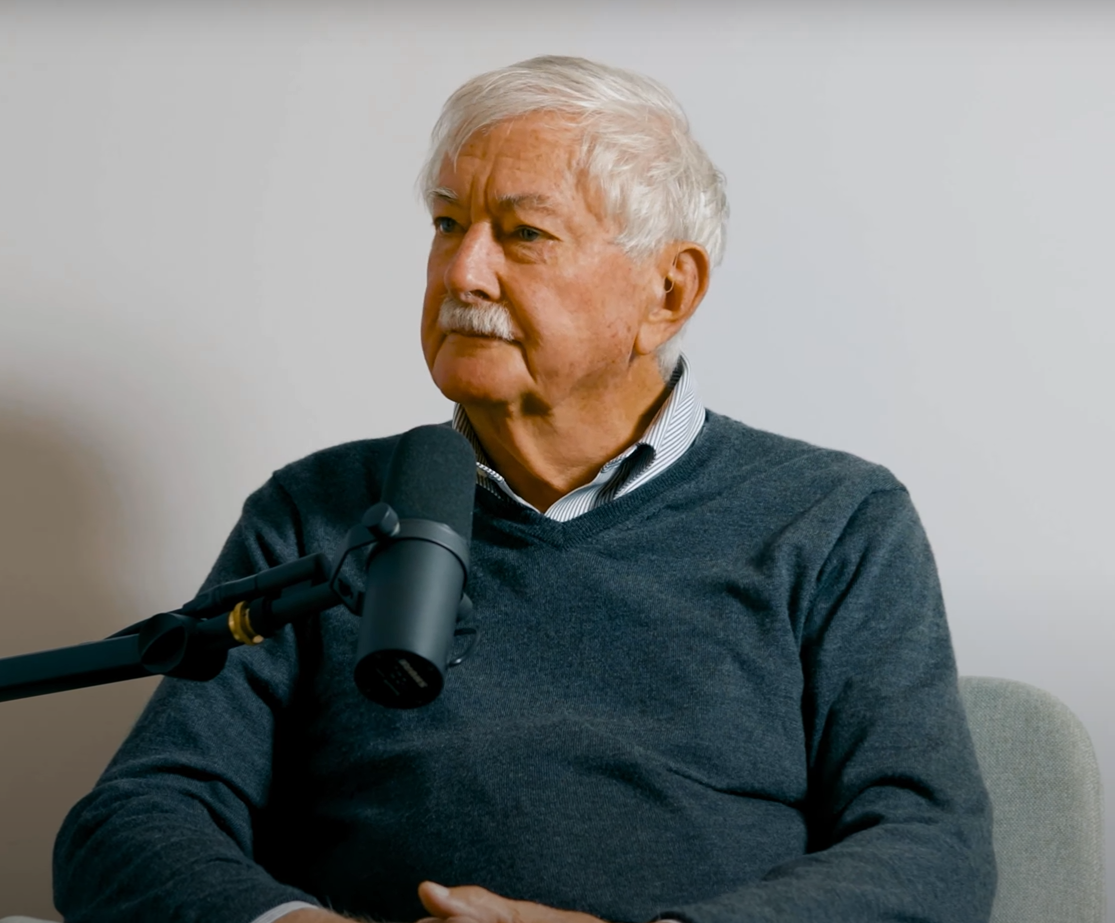
- Croser in 2024

Deputy Chancellor of the University of Adelaide
- In office June 1999 – December 2006
- Chancellor: Bruce Phillip Webb; Himself; Robert Champion de Crespigny; Himself (2); John von Doussa
- Preceded by: Janine Haines; Senior DC Jim Bettison
- Succeeded by: Ross Adler

Acting Chancellor of the University of Adelaide
- In office 2004–2004
- Preceded by: Robert Champion de Crespigny
- Succeeded by: John von Doussa

Acting Chancellor of the University of Adelaide
- In office February – March 2000
- Preceded by: Bruce Phillip Webb
- Succeeded by: Robert Champion de Crespigny

Personal details
- Born: Brian John Croser; March 1948 (age 78) Millicent, South Australia
- Spouse: Ann Croser
- Education: University of Adelaide
- Occupation: Winemaker, viticulturist (1969–)
- Brian Croser's voice Recorded September 2024

Brian John Croser AO (born March 1948) is an Australian winemaker, viticulturist, and former university chancellor.

== Early life and education ==
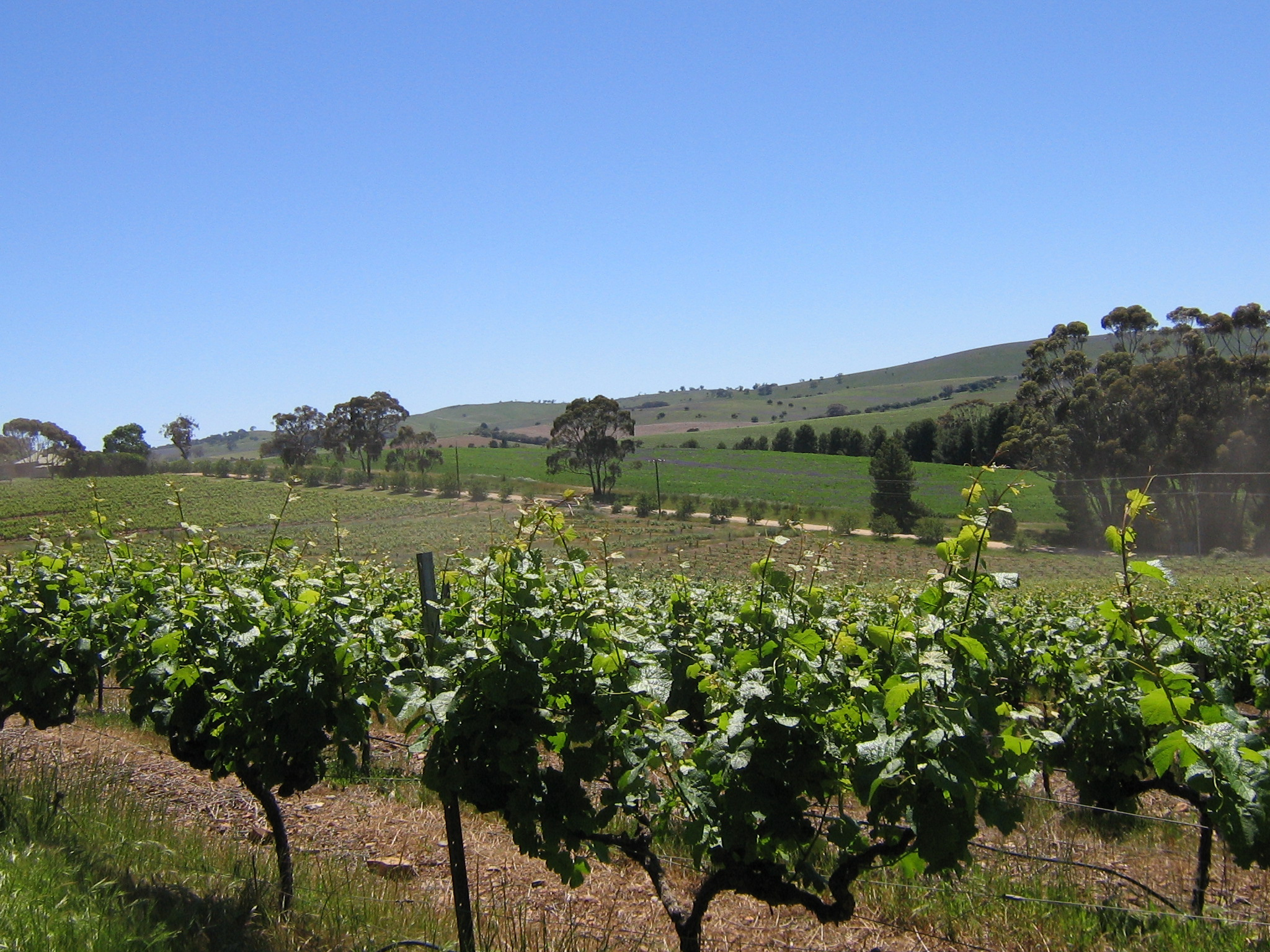
Vineyards in the Clare Valley

Brian John Croser was born in Millicent, South Australia, in March 1948. His parents were both from old farming families, so when his mother did not get on with her father-in-law, the family moved to the Clare Valley and bought a sheep farm. Croser was about six, and he remained in Clare until around the age of sixteen. The valley has many vineyards, and one bordering the farm exposed Croser to the wine industry for the first time. In primary school, Croser was interested in mathematics and science and there he decided to combine it with his passion for farming as an agricultural scientist.

As Croser's parents were Methodists and Protestants, he attended Scotch College, living as a boarder. The headmaster Charles Fisher was enthusiastic about Australian red wine and promoted an interest in wine; which Croser understood as the intersection of geography and biology. After high school, Croser studied horticulture at the University of Adelaide, graduating with a Bachelor of Agricultural Science in 1969. In the second year of his degree, Croser decided to become a winemaker, and determined that he would need more specialized education.

== Career ==
=== Beginnings ===
After graduating, Croser sought a company that would sponsor him to complete a Master's degree, finding it in the winemaker Thomas Hardy and Sons. He worked there in quality control and research and development. After 2.5 years, he moved to the United States to study oenology at the Davis campus of the University of California. By this time he was in a relationship with his future wife Ann, and she accompanied him to the US, providing additional financial support with her work as a biochemist. They would be married by the middle of the decade. Croser found the teaching style disappointing and felt pressure to return because of problems at Hardy and Sons; he left after 15 months and never submitted his thesis on hydrogen sulphide. On the Davis campus, he discovered chardonnay, and was mentored by academics including Harold Olmo and Maynard Amerine.

Back in Australia in 1974, Croser returned to work for Thomas Hardy and Sons, becoming head winemaker in 1975. When production problems arose, Croser determined he was too inexperienced to resolve them, and in December he left to work at the Riverina College of Advanced Education, today part of Charles Sturt University. There, he started the wine science program with Tony Jordan. To add a practical component to their program, in 1977 a winery was built in an old olive oil press; the 1977 vintage received several awards. The program was influential on the modern Australian wine industry.

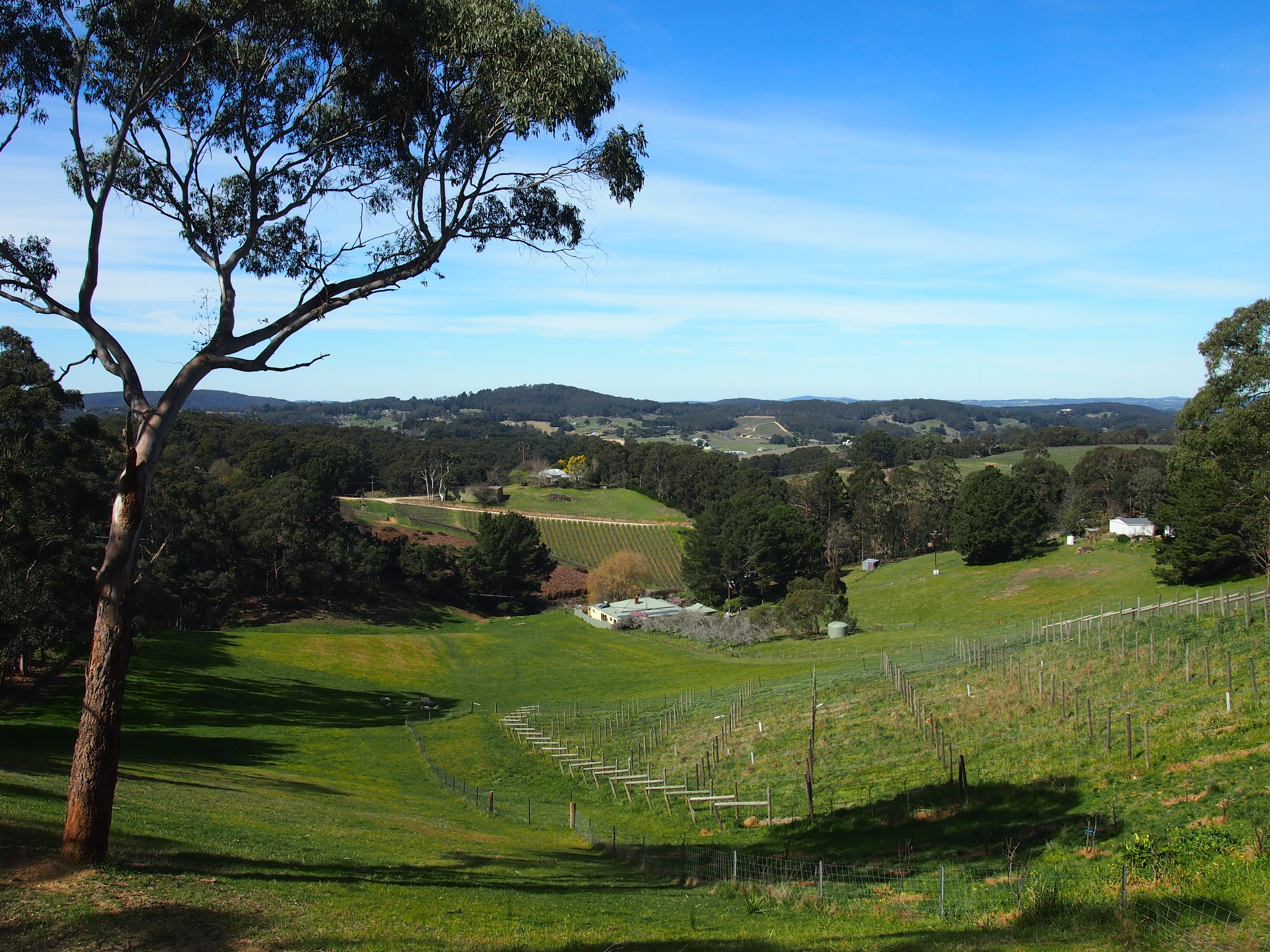
Piccadilly Valley, the site of the Tiers vineyard and the Croser family home

In 1976, Croser started a winery, naming it Petaluma after the city in California. To do so, he planted grapes in the regions that best suited them: Riesling in Clare and Cabernet Sauvignon in Wrattonbully, among others. He was the first in Australia to do this. Champagnes made at this time at Petaluma were some of the first produced in Australia. In 1978, Croser and his wife Ann bought a market garden in the Piccadilly Valley in South Australia, chosen for its cool weather to best grow chardonnay. They planted the Tiers vineyard the following year, and started producing chardonnay from the grapes under the Petaluma name. Petaluma was opened in 1979, and the inaugural 1979 Petaluma Riesling quickly popularized Rieslings with more lifted aromatics in Australia. These Rieslings were noted for their low prices and high quality.

=== Oenotec ===
As part of his contract with Riverina College, Croser could consult wineries. After being pushed into a management role in Riverina College, in August 1978 Croser quit to work full time on the consultancies and Petaluma. An entity for consulting called Oenotec was formed in 1978, and he was soon joined by Jordan. They were extremely influential on Australian wine, and caught planes from harvest-to-harvest, providing hands-on advice. With many clients by the mid-1980s, they were constrained by time, and gave a lot of advice over the phone, as well as sending oenology graduates as full-time winemakers. Their advice focused on promoting anaerobic and hygienic wine production.

Oenotec was acclaimed for improving the quality of Australian wine, but also criticised for perceived arrogance, speculated profiteering and for making the taste of wine less varied and sophisticated. Croser disputed these critiques. Following Oenotec, other wine consultancy firms were started. By 1984, they were retained by thirty firms, and Jordan left to start Domaine Chandon Australia.

=== Hostile takeover of Petaluma ===
In 2001, the large alcohol company Lion Nathan undertook a hostile takeover of the Petaluma winery, which Croser notes significantly affected him. In the fallout, it became apparent that the Tiers vineyard, his home and driveway were under a separate lease. After some time Lion Nathan returned some autonomy to Petaluma, although Croser moved his attention to other projects. As of 2005 the winery was very respected. While working at Petaluma, Croser acted as a professional mentor. In 2014, the Croser family regained control of Petaluma.

As of 2023, it produces chardonnay under the Tapanappa label. Croser was an early proponent of chardonnay in Australia, which later became popular. He has been criticised for being slow to adopt practices such as barrel fermentation for chardonnay. He has endeavored to express the fruit flavour in the wine. Climate change poses a threat to ideal growing conditions for Tiers.

In 1986, Croser founded the Dundee Wine Company, known as the Argyle winery, in Oregon, US.

Croser worked as the deputy chancellor of the University of Adelaide from 1999 to 2007.

In 2002, the Croser family, the Cazes family and Bollinger purchased the small Koppamurra vineyard in Wrattonbully. This was among the oldest vineyards in Wrattonbully, planted in 1975. Bollinger had previously been an early investor in Petaluma. It was renamed the Whalebone vineyard, and the winery was called Tapanappa, after an Aboriginal word for "stick to the path." In 2013 Etienne Bizot of the Bollinger family joined the board of Tapanappa. Croser's daughter Lucy and husband Xavier Bizot, son of Christian Bizot run the business, along with his other son-in-law.

Around 2003, Croser started the Foggy Hill vineyard on the Fleurieu Peninsula, which grows pinot noir. This was an experiment on densely planted low-trellised vines in a cool environment, new to winemaking. Difficulties have come from tannins in the terroir. A separate bottling called "Definitus" since 2017 comes from a part of the vineyard with more intense flavours.

Croser was influential as president of the Winemaker's Federation of Australia between 1991–1993 and 1997–1999. This organisation, through merger, is as of 2018 Australian Grape and Wine Incorporated. He helped create the Australian Society of Viticulture and Oenology. He was president of the Australian Winemakers Forum, which he formed in 1984.

By 2024, Croser was writing his memoir.

== Personal life ==
As of 2021, Croser lived at the Tiers Vineyard in the Piccadilly Valley. He has been married to his wife Ann since at least the mid-1970s, and has three daughters, the second born in 1977.

Within the wine industry, Croser has cited French winemaker Jean‑Michel Cazes as an influence on his work. He is interested in football and reading.

== Views on wine ==
Croser is a prominent critic of what he perceives as lack of quality in the Australian wine industry.

Croser is a critic of the domination of Coles and Woolworths in the Australian liquor market.

== Accolades ==
Brian has been the recipient of several accolades, including:

- 1994: Chief Executive of the Year in South Australia from the Australian Financial Review
- 1997: Maurice O'Shea Award
- 1998: Doctor of Science (honoris causa) from Charles Sturt University. In awarding, they assert he was the most influential individual on the Australian wine industry over the previous decade.
- 2000: Officer of the Order of Australia
- 2004: Decanter Man of the Year
- 2007: Doctor of the University (honoris causa) from the University of Adelaide
- 2016: Viticulturist of the Year from Gourmet Traveller Wine
- 2021: 2021 South Australian Legend of the Vine from Wine Communicators Australia
- 2021: Distinguished Alumni Award (as an alumnus) from University of Adelaide

== See also ==
- List of wine professionals
