= List of Australian wine grape varieties =

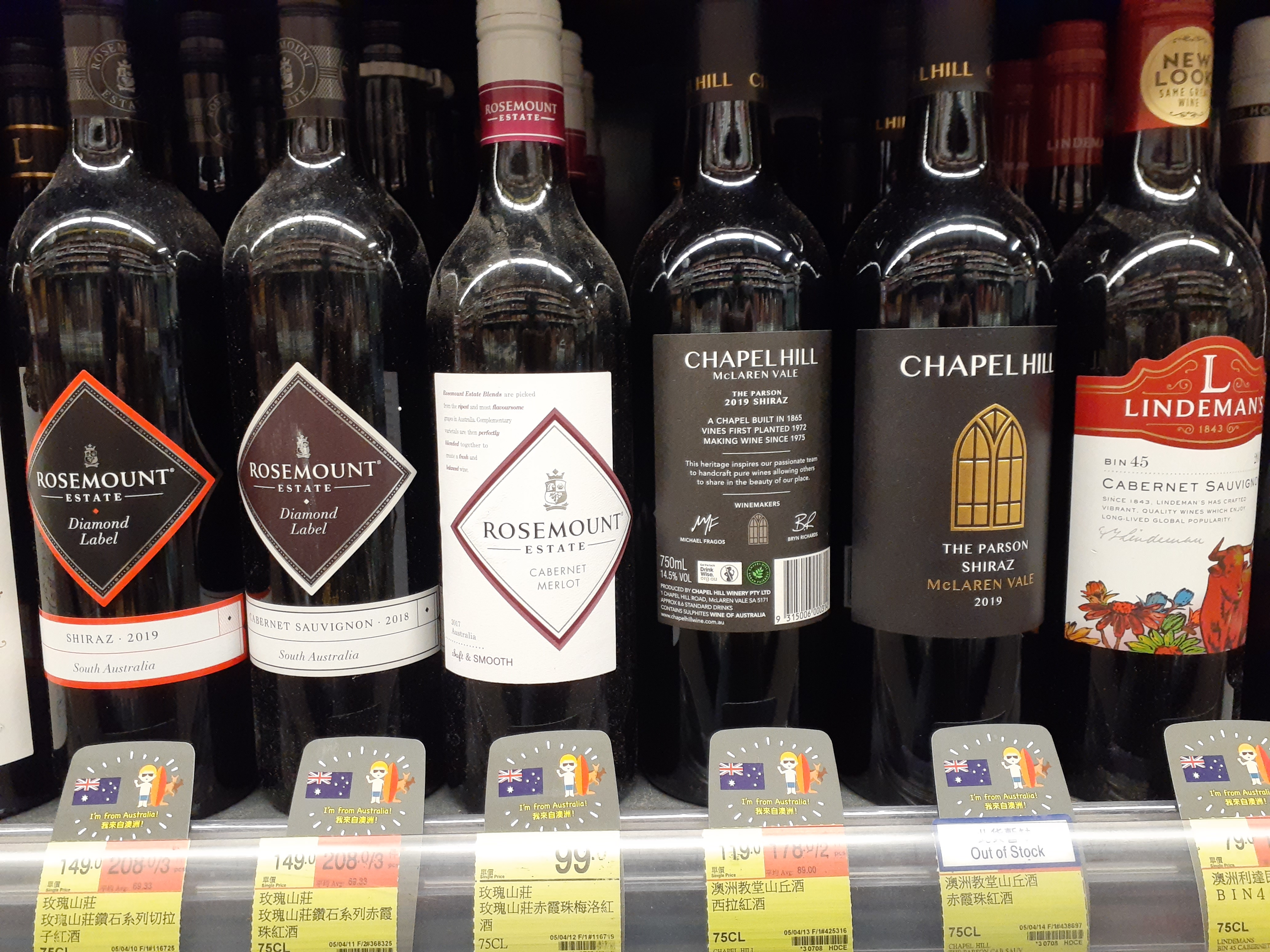
A selection of Australian varietals on sale in Hong Kong

Australia has over 160 grape varieties distributed on 146,244 hectares (ha) across all six states, South Australia, New South Wales, Victoria, Western Australia, Tasmania and Queensland (see Australian wine). These activities are concentrated largely in the southern part of the continent where the terroir - that is, soil types, local climate, availability of irrigation and so on - is suited to viticulture.

Together, the three sectors of the industry, grape growing, winemaking and wine tourism, play a major role in Australia's economy. In the 2018–2019 financial year, they contributed AU$45.5 billion to the national income. In addition, many other businesses benefit from the services they provide to the wine industry. (Note: A 1995 report to the Australian government summarised this: "Some cater exclusively for grapegrowers or wineries (eg harvesting contractors, bottling companies and fermentation equipment suppliers), but many also supply other industries in the region (although the wine industry may be their major customer). Included in this latter category are: transport companies; metal fabricators (eg manufacturers of stainless steel tanks); manufacturers of viticultural machinery; label manufacturers; suppliers of fertilisers and chemicals; consultants specialising in viticulture services; accounting and legal firms; and suppliers of packaging materials.")

== Wine grape varieties - overview ==
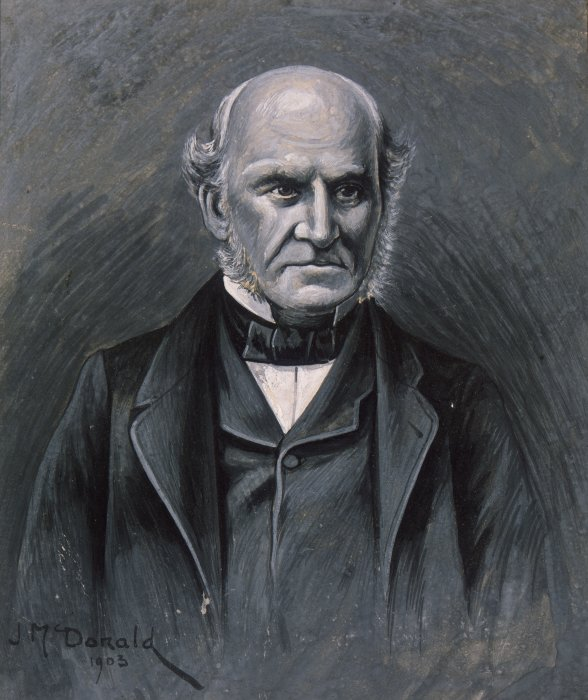
James Busby (1802-1871), a viticulturist who is often called the "father" of Australian winemaking. Wash drawing portrait (1903) by James Ingram McDonald (1865-1935). Alexander Turnbull Library, Wellington, New Zealand.

As of 2018, the ten most widely planted varieties were:

- Syrah (Shiraz), 40,000 ha
- Cabernet Sauvignon, 25,000 ha
- Chardonnay, 21,000 ha
- Merlot, 8,000 ha
- Sauvignon Blanc, 6,000 ha
- Pinot Noir, 5,000 ha
- Sémillon, 5,000 ha
- Pinot Gris, 4,000 ha
- Riesling, 3,000 ha
- Muscat of Alexandria, 2,000 ha

Wine Australia's "Vintage Report 2020" said the largest crush was Shiraz ("376,000 tonnes, accounting for 25 per cent of the total crush") and the second-largest was Chardonnay ("285,000 tonnes").

While the grape varieties listed above have continued to be the backbone of the wine industry over time, growers have discovered less well-known and hardier varieties, especially from Spain, Portugal and Italy, which suit Australia's hot, dry conditions well. Now there are almost 160 other varieties in Australia's vineyards.

Some varieties, including those often called "rare varieties", are planted only in small quantities and are being used by winemakers for specialised products. (Note: Darby Higgs of VinoDiversity provides a detailed list of Australia's rare varieties. He has also written a book, Vinodiversity - the Book: New grape varieties and wines in Australia, in which he describes all the varieties currently being used commercially in this country's wine production, lists all the Zones, Regions and Subregions, discusses the wineries using alternative varieties, and provides an index with locations and contact details for all the wineries operating at the time the book was being written.) Other varieties, including many already widely used overseas, are experiencing an ever-increasing demand in the Australian industry either for use in wines carrying their names on the labels or in the blending process. These include Arneis,Barbera, Durif, Fiano, Gamay Noir, Grüner Veltliner, Lagrein, Nebbiolo, Sangiovese, Saperavi, Tannat, Tempranillo, Vermentino and so on, all of which are dealt with below.

== Government legislation and operation structures ==
The wine industry operates under the Wine Australia Act 2013 and the Wine Australia Regulations 2018. They define the relationship between the Australian Government and the industry as a whole, including the grape growers, winemakers and various representative bodies, as exercised through the relevant Minister, set out the standards by which the industry must operate and penalties that will apply if these are not met, and establish two federal governing bodies, Wine Australia (WA) and the Geographical Indications Committee (GIC).

=== Wine Australia ===
WA describes its function as supporting "a competitive wine sector by investing in research, development and extension (RD&E), growing domestic and international markets, protecting the reputation of Australian wine and administering the Export and Regional Wine Support Package.

The Wine Australia Act 2013 makes WA responsible for the enforcement of the rules and regulations regarding the labelling of wine. WA described these rules and regulations as "complex"; unsurprising because, apart from those set out in this Act, additional labelling requirements arise from the Australia New Zealand Food Standards Code under the Legislation Act 2003, the National Measurement Act 1960, and the Competition and Consumer Act 2010. Everything that appears on the label except the illustration is governed by legislation from one or more of these sources.

WA assists the industry by publishing and distributing guides that explain how the legislation should be interpreted. Specific to the information provided on the tables below in the columns headed "Grape" and "Location - growers and makers", the regulations governing the description of the grape variety and the region in which the grapes were grown are spelt out on WA's website.

=== Geographical Indications Committee ===
GIC's primary role, as WA explains, is to "consider applications for the registration and omission of new Australian and foreign GIs (ie Geographical indications) having regard to the criteria set out in the Act, and in accordance with the administrative processes prescribed under the Act and the accompanying regulations."

=== Zones, regions and sub-regions ===
Australia has 27 wine zones within which there are 65 regions. Some contain smaller sub-regions of which there are 14. Each zone, region and subregion is located within a particular state, has a defined geographical boundary and has gained registration through the GIC according to the Wine Australia Act 2013. The operation of the GIC, the processes and criteria by which it determines whether a zone may or may not be registered, and other matters are laid out in "Division 4 – Australian geographical indications" of this Act.

After gaining registration through GIC, a zone, region or subregion gains a GI. (Note: GI is defined as "a word or expression used in the description and presentation of a wine to indicate the country, region or locality in which it originated or to suggest that a particular quality, reputation or characteristic of the wine is attributable to the wine having originated in the country, region or locality indicated by the word or expression.") This means that winemakers within the relevant zones, regions or sub-regions are allowed to label their products in specifically defined ways. This system is designed to protect consumers and investors against false claims and there are defined legal penalties for those who fail to follow the directives.

Some vineyards and wineries are operating in areas not qualified to be granted GI registration because there are too few similar businesses nearby. As has already happened elsewhere, with the ongoing growth of the wine industry and the establishment of new vineyards, some areas may eventually qualify for GI status.

== Use of road transport ==
Some winemakers make the bulk of their wine from grapes grown in their own vineyards. But many winemakers rely on other winegrowers to supply grape juice for their use, and not all winegrowers are winemakers as well. This means some winegrowers sell part or all of their output to others, and for an industry spread across all six states on a large continent, road transport plays a major role in moving stock from one place to another.

Reports on the actual volume of grapes and wine being transported each year are hard to find. In trying to calculate this by comparing the volume of grapes grown per region with the volume of where they were processed by region, Chris Quirk wrote of bulk transportation:

"This is difficult to track but it could be in the order of half a million litres a week. It is therefore difficult to accurately compare the significance of one wine region over another. Modern technology has clouded the issue." (Note: Considering the age of this book and the fact that Australia's volume of output has greatly increased since then, it could be safely estimated that the volume transported by road would now be significantly more than half a million litres.)

Robinson commented on this with some irony:

"The importance of trucking should not be underestimated. The typical large winery is probably based in South Australia, often in the Barossa, but will buy in grapes from as far afield as Coonawarra, the irrigated interior and possibly even the Hunter Valley in New South Wales. (Conversely, it has been a source of persistent irritation to South Australians that they have long provided so much fruit to bolster the reputations of wineries based in New South Wales.)"

The problem in devising the Lists below from available sources was in determining whether wine regions showing in relation to each variety related to where it was grown or where it was used in producing an end-product. As a result, the column headed "Location - growers and makers" includes both.

== Identifying a variety - the problem with homonyms and synonyms ==
Wine grape varieties are usually known by what is called the "prime name", and it is under this name they tend to be listed in official and academic documents such as the Vitis International Variety Catalogue (VIVC) and Kym Anderson et al.'s Which Winegrape is Grown Where?: A Global Empirical Picture. In addition, varieties usually have alternative names known as homonyms and synonyms which have been applied for a wide range of reasons.

Sometimes in a particular country, a variety may have a prime name which is different from its prime name in the international context. For example, the variety Tempranillo was given this name in its country of origin, Spain, and tends to be known internationally by this same name. But in Spain alone it has 45 other synonyms, while in Portugal it is listed officially as Aragonez but it has ten other synonyms which vary from region to region, and internationally it has over 60 synonyms. Compared with other varieties, this is a relatively small number. There are, for example, some varieties which have more than 200 or 300 homonyms or synonyms: over 250 for Chasselas Blanc, about 300 for Pinot Noir, and close to 350 for Muscat à Petits Grains Blancs.

Often homonyms or synonyms of a particular variety are a direct translation from one language or dialect to another. Pinot Blanc, for example, originated from France and therefore its prime name is in French, but in Italian it is called Pinot Bianco (bianco = white) and Pinot Bijeli (bijeli = white) in Croatian and languages or dialects related to Serbo-Croatian.

Sometimes, when a variety originated from a particular place or has been grown there for a long time, it can be given a local name that reflects that association. Arinto, for example, has among its synonyms Arinto d'Anadia, Arinto de Bucelas, Arinto do Dão and Arinto do Douro as well as Asal Espanhol, Pé de Perdiz Branco and Terrantez de Terceira.

Further confusion has arisen when a particular homonym or synonym has been given to more than one variety. Espadeiro, for example, is the prime name in Portugal for a variety; but as Wein-Plus warns, "It must not be confused with Camaraou Noir, Manseng Noir (both from France), Padeiro, Trincadeira Preta or Vinhão (all five having the synonym Espadeiro), despite the fact that they may share synonyms or have morphological similarities."

Probably the greatest confusion of identity has come about through misidentification, (Note: This report from Wine Australia shows how Gros Manseng was misidentified there as Petit Manseng.) misnaming, (Note: In this report, the authors explain why vines growing in different parts of Georgia were being identified as the same variety and the process by which they were finally found to be distinctly different varieties.) or mislabelling. (Note: Mislabelling can occur for many reasons including the grower's or winemaker's confusion about the identity of the grapes used in a wine's production. There are also cases where this has been carried out deliberately and has led to criminal charges being laid against the perpetrators. This news report focuses on such an event in France.) Some growers, for example, have found themselves with vines for which they have no formal identification and have based their decision on observation or even guesswork; so if the vine, grape or seasonal behaviour is similar to that of another variety, it is not surprising that the variety is given an incorrect name. The occurrence of mislabelling was also frequent in the past, especially when the gathering and exchanging of cuttings were carried out informally and without some form of control. New legislation and strict administration have reduced but not eliminated this risk.

== Lists of wine grape varieties ==
For an explanation of techniques used for the investigation of a variety's genetic structure and the determination of its pedigree, see Sean Myles, Adam R Boyko, et al. "Genetic structure and domestication history of the grape."

== Supplemental references used for charts ==
- Anderson, Kym, and Signe Nelgen. Which Winegrape is Grown Where?: A Global Empirical Picture, Revised Edition. Edited by Kym Anderson and N R Aryal. University of Adelaide Press, 2020. ISBN 978-1-925261-86-8 Published online 2020. ISBN 978-1-925261-87-5. Accessed 2 February 2021. (Databases relevant to this book can be accessed in Excel spreadsheet format at
- "FPS Grape Registry: Grapevine Varieties." Foundation Plant Services (FPS), College of Agricultural and Environmental Sciences, University of California, Davis. Accessed 23 February 2020.
- Halliday, James, et al. Halliday Wine Companion. Accessed 9 March 2020.
- _____. James Halliday's Wine Atlas of Australia. Hardie Grant, 2014. ISBN 1-74270-396-8.
- _____. Varietal Wines: A guide to 130 varieties grown in Australia and their place in the international wine landscape. Hardie Grant Books, 2015. ISBN 1-74270-860-9.
- Higgs, Darby. Vinodiversity. Accessed 5 March 2020.
- Maul, Erika, et al. Vitis International Variety Catalogue. (VIVC). Julius Kühn-Institut - Federal Research Centre for Cultivated Plants (JKI), Institute for Grapevine Breeding - Geilweilerhof. Accessed 7 March 2020.
- Robinson, Jancis. Vines, Grapes & Wines: A wine drinker's guide to grape varieties. Mitchell Beazley, 1986. ISBN 1-85732-999-6.
- Robinson, Julia Harding et al. The Oxford Companion to Wine. 4th Edition. Edited by Jancis Robinson and Julia Harding. Oxford University Press, 2015. ISBN 978-0-19-870538-3.
- Robinson, Harding and José Vouillamoz. Wine Grapes: A complete guide to 1,368 vine varieties, including their origins and flavours. HarperCollins, 2013. ISBN 0-14-196882-6. Access available online at Apple Books. ISBN 0-06-232551-5 Accessed 7 March 2020.
- Tischelmayer, Norbert, et al. "Glossary." Wein-Plus. (WPG) Accessed 7 March 2020.
- Wine Australia. (WA) Accessed 7 March 2020.
- Wine-Searcher. Grape Varieties.. Accessed 7 March 2020.
