= Ao Yun =

Chinese winery

Ao Yun (敖云)
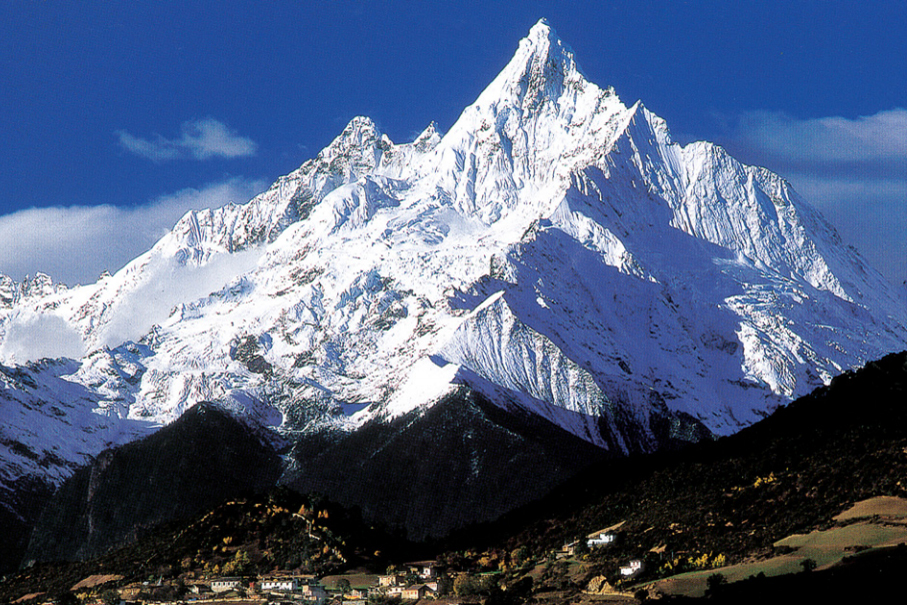
- Ao Yun is located at the base of the Meili Snow Mountains
- Location: Deqin County, Yunnan
- First vintage: 2013
- Key people: Tony Jordan
- Parent company: LVMH
- Website: www.aoyun-wine.com

Ao Yun (敖云) (meaning flying above the clouds) is a winery in Deqin County, Yunnan. It is majority owned by LVMH, and released its first vintage, the 2013, in 2016. The location was the product of a four-year search by Australian winemaker Tony Jordan to produce red wines comparable to that of Bordeaux in China. It is the most valuable Chinese wine for collectors. Factors associated with the above 7,000 feet (2,100 m) elevation create a plurality of terroirs and unusual conditions which results in a unique blend.

== History ==
=== Pre-winery ===
French Catholic missionaries staying on the outskirts of Tibet planted French grape vines in the 1840s, including Cabernet Sauvignon, in the Cizhong churchyard for use in mass. The last missionaries were expelled by the Chinese government in 1952, but the Catholic locals persisted in the upkeep of six hundred vines for use in mass as they were taught by the missionaries. Vineyard plots are known locally as mu.

In 1992, the Chinese government encouraged villagers to plant vineyards in the area, which were sold to a large baijiu distillery. In 2000, Cabernet Sauvignon and Cabernet Franc were planted on ungrafted rootstock. As of 2022 this constituted half of the 27 hectares under vine.

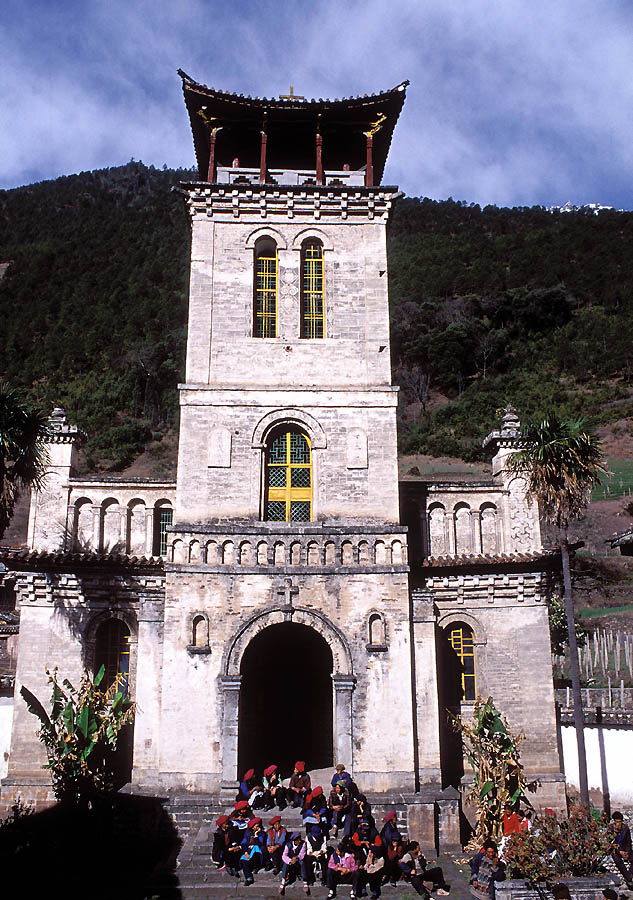
Cizhong church, Yunnan, where wineyards were found by Tony Jordan

=== Context of establishment ===
Starting a quality red in China was partly motivated by the growing number of wealthy Chinese wine collectors as of 2008. China was historically the exception of the rule that countries which consumed fine wine also produced it. Wine was traditionally seen as valuable when they had a centuries of history, but there has been a shift to valuing novelty and rarity. The estate director as of 2021, Maxence Dulou claims the establishment was motivated by the international value in the novelty of Chinese terroirs.

=== Scouting ===
Moët-Hennessy hired Australian winemaker Tony Jordan to find a location in China to grow grapes for red wine comparable in quality to the Bordeaux region. They estimated it would take eighteen months, but it took four years.

Jordan began by studying weather maps. Kashmir was ruled out due to political instability. The east coast was ruled out from Jordan's experience growing in Qingdao in 1994 for Moët-Hennessy being defined by mildew and vine disease being too impactful. The north was ruled out as during cold winter temperatures, vines must be buried, which impacts grape quality. More arid inland areas were less affected by this. In some cases grape quality defects could be managed out, in others they could not. In promising locations, weather measurement devices were set up and locals were interviewed, and Jordan travelled with weather measuring equipment on his back. Jordan was also tasked with finding a location for producing sparkling wine in China, and he chose Ningxia. He was inspired to look in the mountains of Sichuan and Yunnan by Chinese scientists Li Demei and Li Hua. Jordan was surprised to see vines growing in the Cizhong courtyard in 2010, but believed the weather was not ideal for grape production. Jordan took hundreds of soil and weather measurements below the Meili Snow Mountains, a sacred place in Tibetan Buddhism, and found good conditions: dry, sufficiently warm for ripening weather, and uniform river-gravel soil.

=== Setting up ===
In February 2012 Moët-Hennessy entered a contract with the Shangri-Li Winery Company, controlling 66.7% of the venture. Jordan negotiated fifty year leases on seventy-five acres spread across 320 plots.

In 2013, Merlot, Petit Verdot, Syrah as well as Cabernet Sauvignon and Cabernet Franc were planted on grafted rootstock.

=== Operation ===
The first vintage, the 2013, was released in 2016 and contained 24,000 bottles.

Farmers were initially moved off their individual plots of land to work in groups, but when this impacted quality it was reverted in 2019.

On 30 March 2022, Ao Yun 2018 became the first Chinese grand cru released through the Bordeaux négociant system. This means distribution in China is undertaken by Moët-Hennessy, while international distribution is managed by La Place de Bordeaux.

As of 2022, new terraces were being planted in the village of Sinong containing Syrah, Cabernet Franc and Malbec.

== Location ==
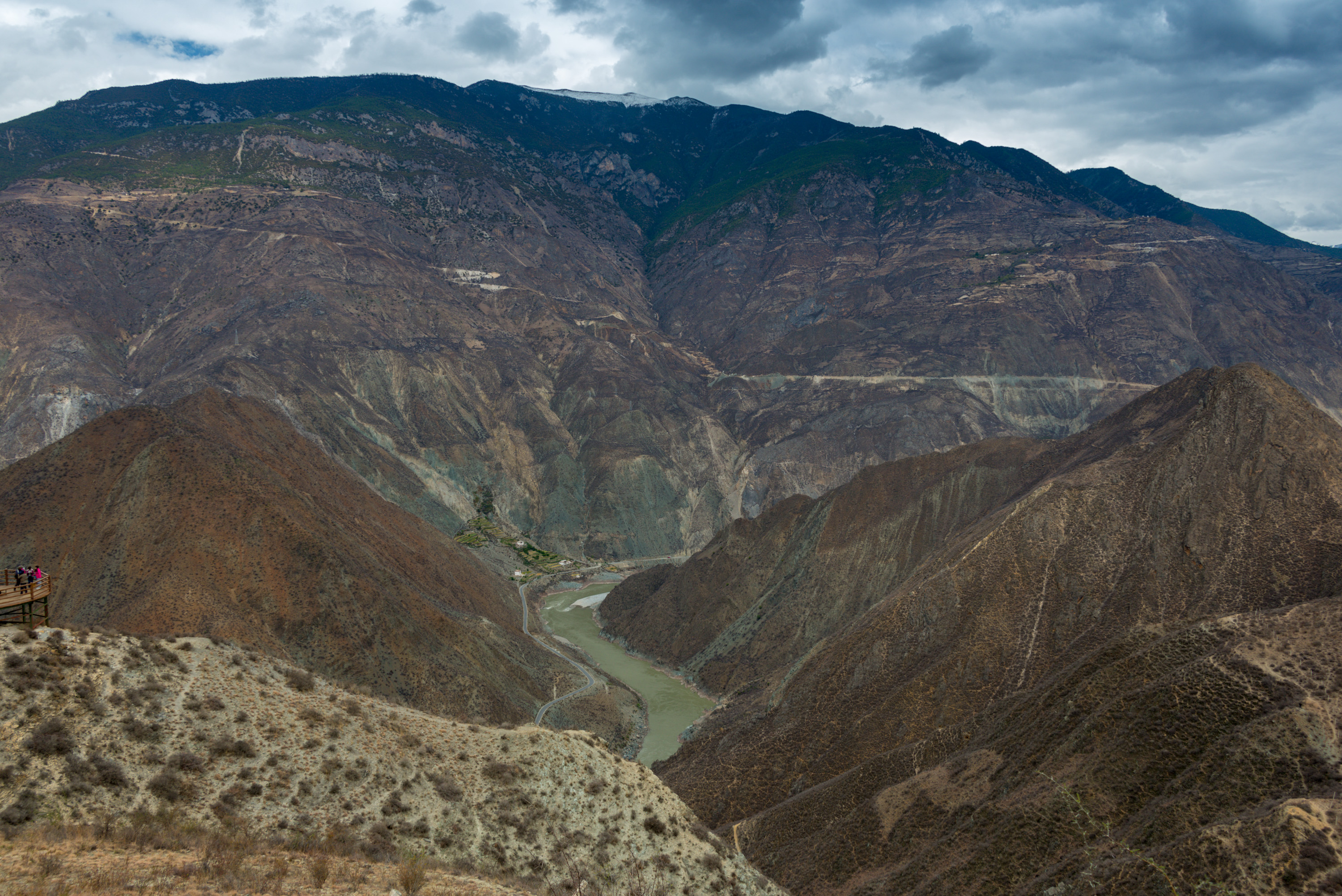
River going through the Meili Snow Mountains in Yunnan

Grapes are grown between 7,000–8,500 feet (2,100–2,600 m) elevation across the four villages of Xidang, Sinong, Shuori and Adong. The vineyards sit in a rain shadow, requiring snowmelt to be channeled for irrigation. It is a four-hour drive from Shangri-La City, on mountain roads which can be unsafe and exacerbate difficulties.

The area is part of a UNESCO protected area of three parallel rivers.

== Character ==
The vines are split across villages on two sides of the Mekong river valley. The large variances in altitude create extreme differences in harvesting ranges, which allows growers to react to the yearly weather by planting at different altitudes.

Plots are farmed without mechanical intervention by 120 families. Each hectare is estimated to require 3,500 hours work per year.

Wine growth being broken into several plots of land creates 35 identified terroirs. The philosophy of the wine according to Maxence Dulou is a "subtle combination of the Burgundian and the Bordelais," using fragmented terroirs from Bergundy and blending techniques from Bordelais. The variance of terroirs creates variance in vintages. 40% of production is discarded, and 10% is bottled specifically for village crus.

The wine is impacted by its location in a rain shadow, high UV light from the altitude (producing impacts on grapes such as thicker skins and greater density), from the mountain reducing sun exposure by 30%, cool climate and large variance in day and night temperature. Wine is fermented in ex-baijiu jars to permit greater oxygen flow, countering the reduced oxygen at sea level. Blending is done at sea level to counter changes in taste. These factors lengthen the harvest by 20–25 days than in Bordeaux, resulting in a harvest 160 days after flowering, to make the tannins more "silky".

== Reception ==
Ao Yun wine is acclaimed, although noted as very expensive. As of 2023, it was considered the most valuable Chinese wine among collectors.

Its success has been partly attributed to the compelling narrative around its creation.
