= Huds and Toke =

Australian pet treat manufacturer

- Company type: Private
- Industry: Pet Supplies / Manufacturing
- Founded: 2014
- Founders: Russell and Emma Gibbons
- Headquarters: Sunshine Coast, Australia
- Products: Pet treats for dogs, horses, and small animals
- Website: www.hudsandtoke.com.au

Huds and Toke is an Australian pet treat manufacturer based on the Sunshine Coast, Queensland. The company produces dog, horse and small-animal treats with markets its products as sustainable. The company exports to several international markets.

== History ==
Huds and Toke was founded in 2014 by Russell and Emma Gibbons, transitioning from home-based baking to a purpose-built facility with support from Advance Queensland grants.

== Products ==
The company manufactures a variety of treats, including dog biscuits, horse cookies and snacks for small pets. In collaboration with Krispy Kreme Australia, it launched "Doggie Doughnuts" — dog-safe doughnut-shaped biscuits inspired by the brand’s flavours.

== Sustainability ==
Huds and Toke incorporates sustainability into its operations. It operates a solar-powered manufacturing facility and has utilised insect-based protein (e.g. black soldier fly larvae) in its products ahead of broader industry trends.

== Recognition and international reach ==
Founder Emma Gibbons received the 2023 Queensland AgriFutures Rural Women’s Award. The company has gained media attention and government support for its export success, including expansion into markets such as Japan, Singapore, Germany, the United States and the United Kingdom.
