= Australian wine =

Wine making in Australia

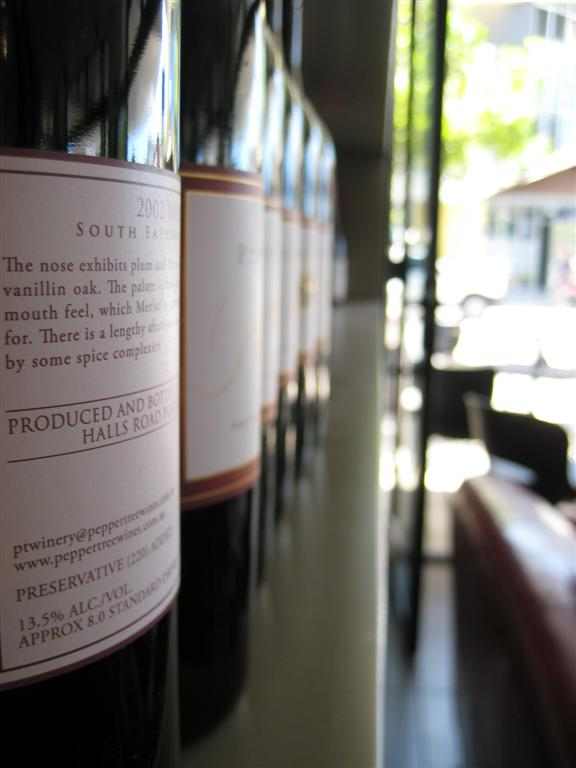
Wine shelf

The Australian wine industry is one of the world's largest exporters of wine, with approximately 800 million out of the 1.2 to 1.3 billion litres produced annually exported to overseas markets. The wine industry is a significant contributor to the Australian economy through production, employment, export, and tourism, with South Australian wine being responsible for more than half of the production of all Australian wine.

There is a $3.5 billion domestic market for Australian wines, with Australians consuming approximately 500 million litres annually, only 16.6% of wine sold domestically is imported. Norfolk Islanders are the second biggest per capita wine consumers in the world with 54 litres.

Wine is produced in every state, with more than 60 designated wine regions totalling approximately 160,000 hectares; however Australia's wine regions are mainly in the southern, cooler parts of the country, with vineyards located in South Australia, New South Wales, Victoria, Western Australia, Tasmania and Queensland. The wine regions in each of these states produce different wine varieties and styles that take advantage of the particular terroir, such as: climatic differences, topography and soil types. The major varieties are predominantly Shiraz, Cabernet Sauvignon, Chardonnay, Merlot, Sémillon, Pinot noir, Riesling, and Sauvignon blanc. Wines are often labelled with the name of their grape variety, which must constitute at least 85 percent of the wine.

== History ==
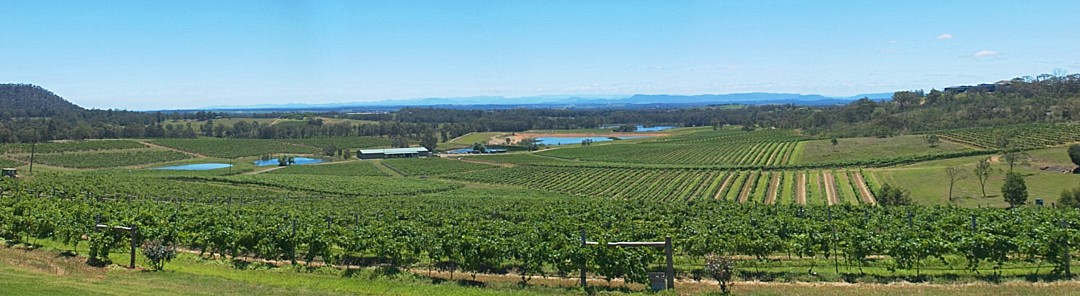
Audrey Wilkinson vineyard in the Hunter Valley

Consumer price index for wine in Australia since 1980

Vine cuttings from the Cape of Good Hope were brought to the penal colony of New South Wales by Governor Phillip on the First Fleet (1788). Wine produced from this was initially for household use.

An attempt at wine making from these first vines failed, but with perseverance, other settlers managed to successfully cultivate vines for winemaking, and Australian made wine was available for sale domestically by the 1820s. In 1822 Gregory Blaxland became the first person to export Australian wine, and was the first winemaker to win an overseas award. In 1830 vineyards were established in the Hunter Valley. In 1833 James Busby returned from France and Spain with a serious selection of grape varieties including most classic French grapes and a good selection of grapes for fortified wine production.

Wine from the Adelaide Hills was sent to Queen Victoria in 1844, but there is no evidence that she placed an order as a result. The production and quality of Australian wine was much improved by the arrival of free settlers from various parts of Europe, who used their skills and knowledge to establish some of Australia's premier wine regions. For example, emigrants from Prussia in the mid-1850s were important in establishing South Australia's Barossa Valley as a winemaking region. In smaller scale, winemakers from Switzerland also helped in establishing Geelong wine region in Victoria in 1842.

In 1853, Australia had less than six hundred hectares of grapes, with only a portion used for winemaking.

Early Australian winemakers faced many difficulties, particularly due to the unfamiliar Australian climate. But because it is also warm, dry, and Mediterranean overall, making Australia ideal for wine production, they eventually achieved considerable success. "At the 1873 Vienna Exhibition the French judges, tasting blind, praised some wines from Victoria, but withdrew in protest when the provenance of the wine was revealed, on the grounds that wines of that quality must clearly be French." Australian wines continued to win high honours in French competitions. A Victorian Syrah (also called Shiraz) competing in the 1878 Paris Exhibition was likened to Château Margaux and "its taste completed its trinity of perfection." One Australian wine won a gold medal "first class" at the 1882 Bordeaux International Exhibition and another won a gold medal "against the world" at the 1889 Paris International Exhibition. That was all before the destructive effects on the industry of the phylloxera epidemic.

Australia has rapidly become a world leader in both the quantity and quality of wines it produces. For example, Australian wine exports to the US rose from 578,000 cases in 1990 to 20,000,000 cases in 2004 and in 2000 it exported more wine than France to the UK for the first time in history.

The industry has at times suffered from its own productivity. In the late 1980s, governments sponsored growers to pull out their vines when Australia was a net importer of wine. Low grape prices in 2005 and 2006 have led to calls for another sponsored vine pull. Cleanskin wines were introduced into Australia during the 1960s as a means to combat oversupply and poor sales.

During the Black Summer bushfires of 2019 to 2020, winemaking was adversely affected in production areas struck by fire or smoke, which affects flavour through smoke taint. The Adelaide Hills wine region was particularly badly hit, losing up to 30% of its vineyards. Some winemakers found innovative ways to get around the problem of tainted grapes.

In 2020, China placed taxes of more than 200% on Australian wines at a time when China was Australia's most lucrative market. As relations between the two countries improved the tariffs were removed in March 2024.

In 2024, in part due to overproduction as well as falling consumption, Australian vignerons uprooted millions of vines.

== Grape varieties ==
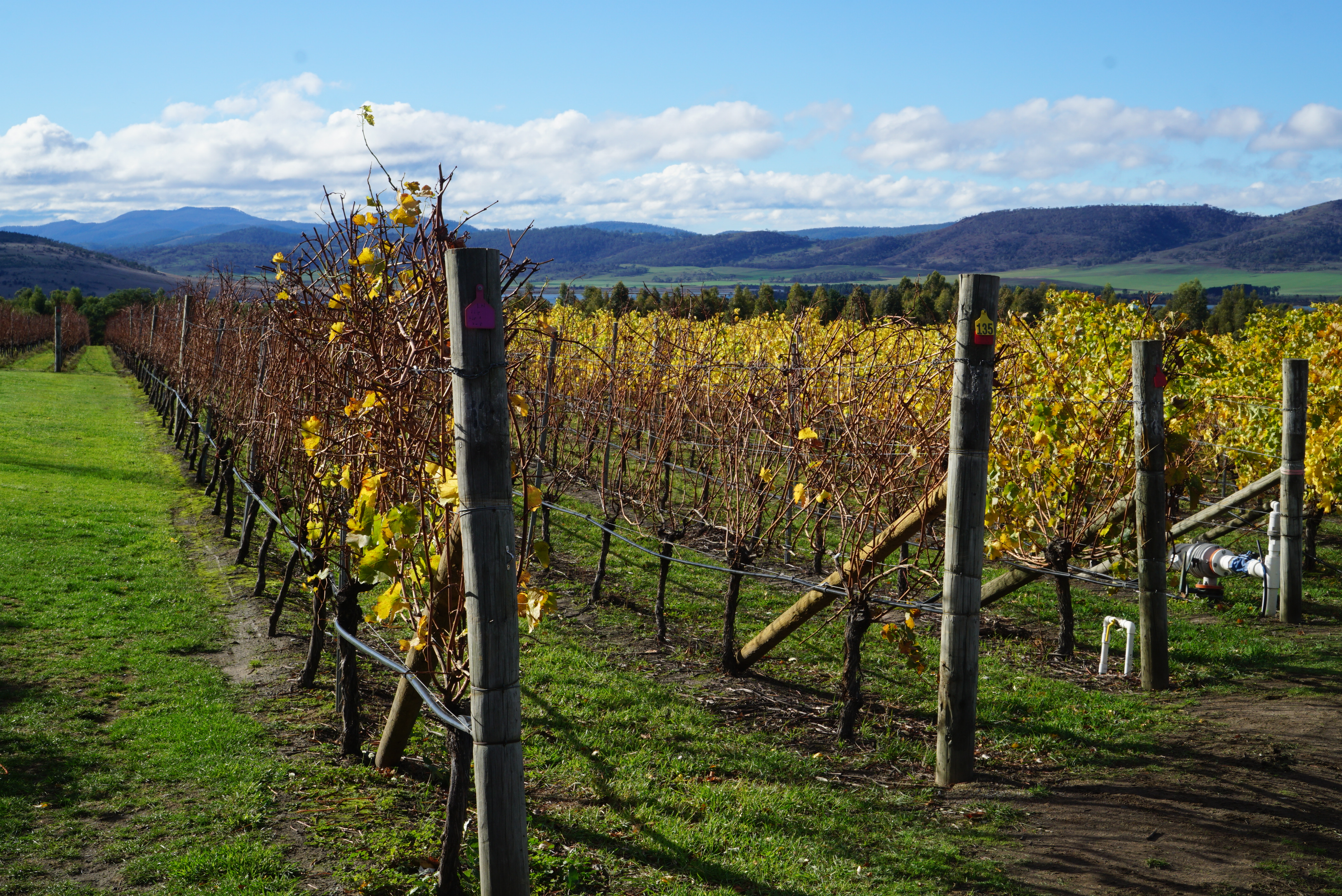
A vineyard in Tasmania

Major grape varieties are Shiraz, Pinot noir, Cabernet Sauvignon, Merlot, Chardonnay, Sauvignon blanc, Sémillon, and Riesling. The country has no native grapes, and Vitis vinifera varieties were introduced from Europe and South Africa in the late 18th and early 19th centuries. Some varieties have been bred by Australian viticulturists, for example Cienna and Tarrango. The most widely cultivated grape variety in Australia is Shiraz.

About 130 different grape varieties are used by commercial winemakers in Australia. Over recent years many winemakers have been rediscovering so-called "alternative varieties" other than those listed above. Many varieties from France, Italy and Spain, for example Petit Verdot, Pinot grigio, Sangiovese, Tempranillo, Nebbiolo, Malbec, Barbera, Arneis, Fiano and Viognier are becoming more common. Wines from many other varieties are being produced.

Australian winemaking results have been impressive and it has established benchmarks for a number of varietals, such as Chardonnay, Pinot noir and Shiraz. Moreover, Australians have innovated in canopy management and other viticultural and in wine-making techniques, and they have a general attitude toward their work that sets them apart from producers in Europe. Australian wine-makers travel the wine world as highly skilled seasonal workers, relocating to the northern hemisphere during the off-season at home. They are an important resource in the globalisation of wine and wine critic Matt Kramer notes that "the most powerful influence in wine today" comes from Australia.

=== GSM blends ===
GSM is a name commonly used for a red wine consisting of a blend of Grenache, Shiraz (Syrah), and Mourvèdre. Blends where Shiraz is the main component are sometimes referred to instead as SGM.

This blend originated from those used in some Southern Rhône wines, including Châteauneuf-du-Pape, though it is also found in South Australia, California (particularly Paso Robles, originating with Tablas Creek Vineyard), and Washington (Columbia Valley); smaller production exists in Argentina and South Africa. A very similar blend is traditional to Priorat (in Catalonia, Spain), still based on Garnacha (Grenache), but adding Mazuelo (Carignan), Syrah, and Merlot (same GS, different M's).

Grenache is the lightest of the three grapes, producing a pale red juice with soft berry scents and a bit of spiciness. As a blending component, it contributes alcohol, warmth and fruitiness without added tannins. Shiraz can contribute full-bodied, fleshy flavours of black fruits and pepper. It adds colour, backbone and tannins and provides the sense of balance such blends require. Mourvèdre contributes elegance, structure and acidity to the blend, producing flavours of sweet plums, roasted game and hints of tobacco.

== Production ==
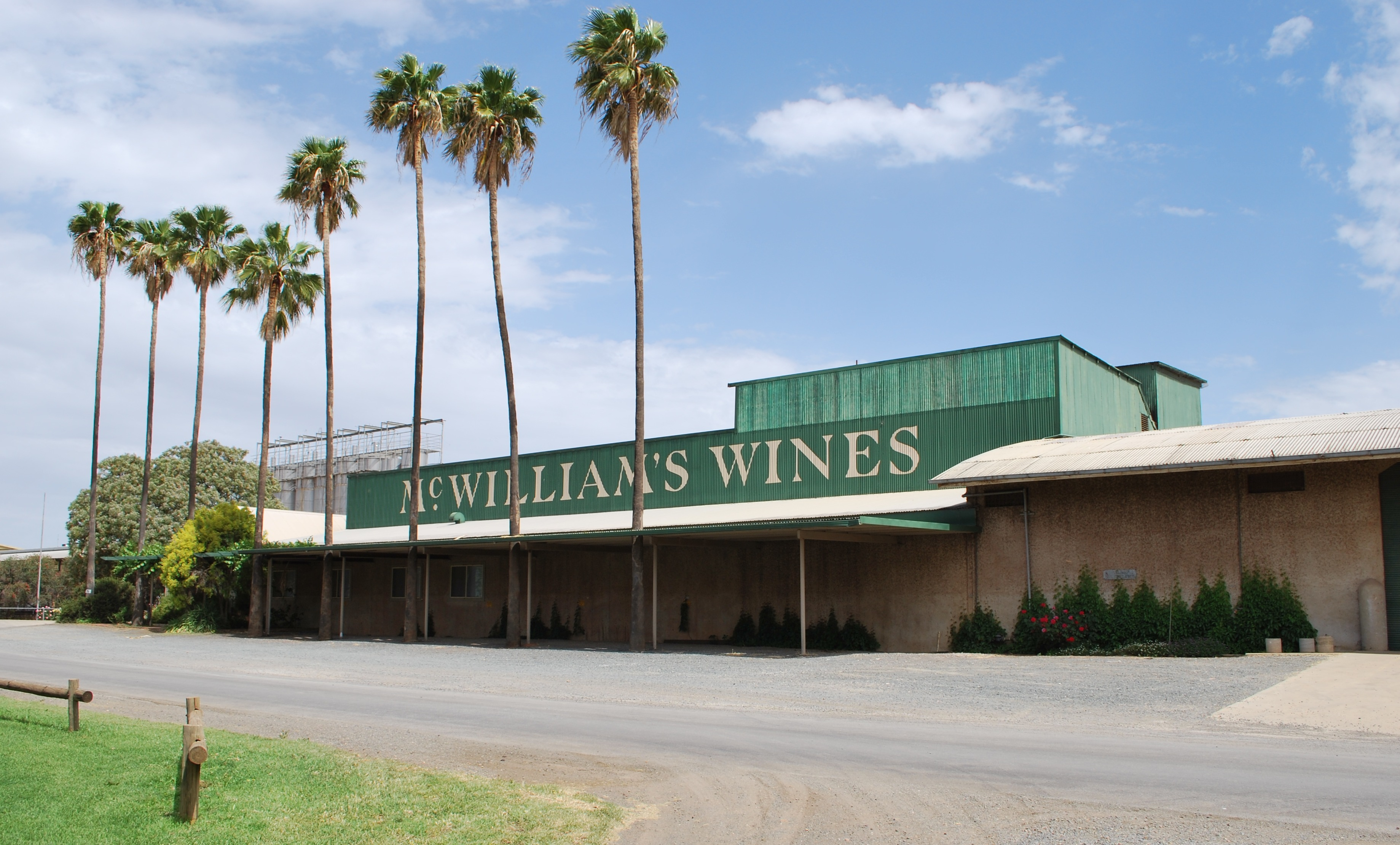
McWilliams winery near Griffith in the Riverina wine region

Australia's most famous wine is Penfolds Grange. The great 1955 vintage was submitted to competitions beginning in 1962 and over the years has won more than 50 gold medals. The vintage of 1971 won first prize in Syrah/Shiraz at the Wine Olympics in Paris. The 1990 vintage was named 'Red Wine of the Year' by the Wine Spectator magazine in 1995, which later rated the 1998 vintage 99 points out of a possible 100. Wine critic Hugh Johnson has called Grange the only First Growth of the Southern Hemisphere. The influential wine critic Robert Parker, who is well known for his love of Bordeaux wines, has written that Grange "has replaced Bordeaux's Pétrus as the world's most exotic and concentrated wine". Other red wines to garner international attention include Henschke Hill of Grace, Clarendon Hills Astralis, D'Arenberg Dead Arm, Torbreck Run Rig and other high-end Penfolds wines such as St Henri shiraz.

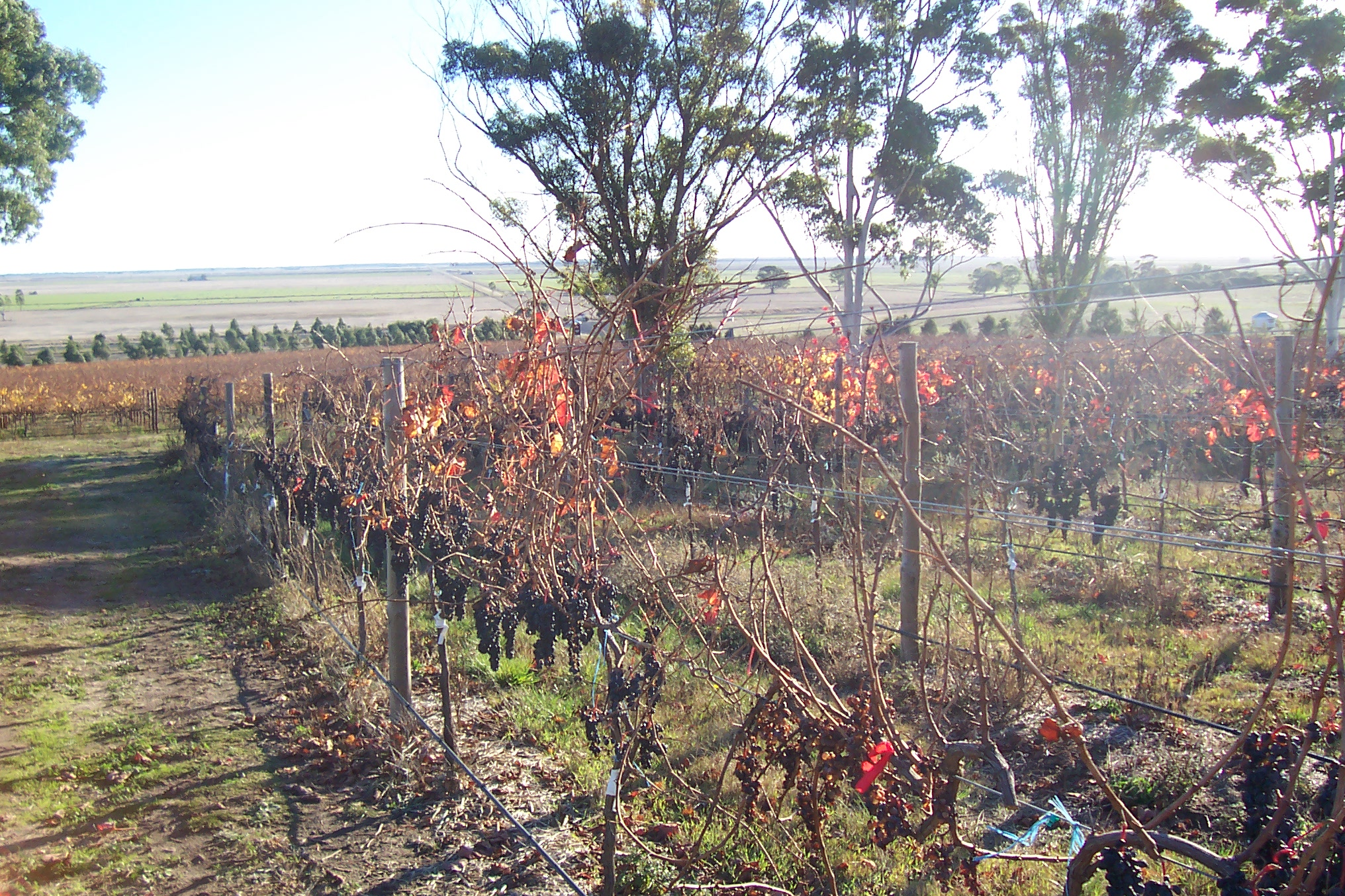
Grapevines at Russet Ridge Winery near Naracoorte in the Wrattonbully region

Australia has almost 2000 wine producers, most of whom are small winery operations. The market is dominated by a small number of major wine companies. The largest wineries are the Casella winery in Yenda, NSW (Yellow Tail wines) and the Berri Estates winery in Glossop, South Australia. The ownership of wineries varies but their location has largely been the same since the introduction of stainless steel tanks in the 1990s, there was a major change in the wine industry in the 1980s when local winegrower cooperatives ceased operations or were privatised.

The majority of grapes are grown in warm climate regions, including the Riverina, Murray Valley and Riverland wine regions, located in southern NSW, north western Victoria and South Australia. A 2019 report by the Australian Competition and Consumer Commission examined grape production in these areas and the myriad competition and consumer issues facing growers.

== Major wine regions ==
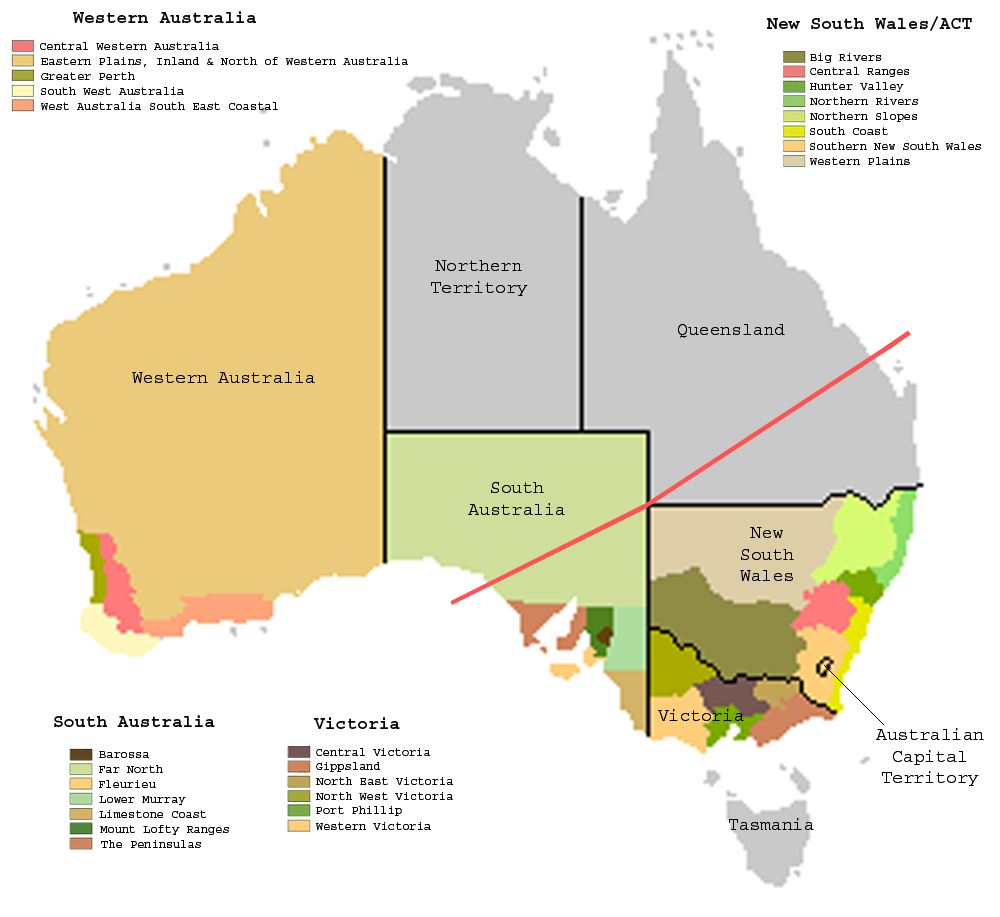
Zones used for labelling the source of Australian wine

The information included on wine labels is strictly regulated. One aspect of this is that the label must not make any false or misleading statements about the source of the grapes. Many names (called geographic indications) are protected. These are divided into "South Eastern Australia", the state names, zones (shown in the map), regions, and subregions. The largest volume of wine is produced from grapes grown in the warm climate Murray-Darling Basin zones of Lower Murray, North Western Victoria and Big Rivers. In general, the higher-value premium wines are made from smaller and cooler-climate regions.

The South Australian wine industry is responsible for most of the production of wine in Australia. In recent years, the Tasmanian wine industry has emerged as a producer of high quality wines. In particular, the Tamar Valley has developed a reputation for its Chardonnay and Pinot noir, which are well suited to the cooler Tasmanian climate. Queensland is also developing a wine industry with over 100 vineyards registered in the state. Some notable wines are produced in the high-altitude Granite Belt region in the state's extreme south, production is centred on the towns of Stanthorpe and Ballandean.

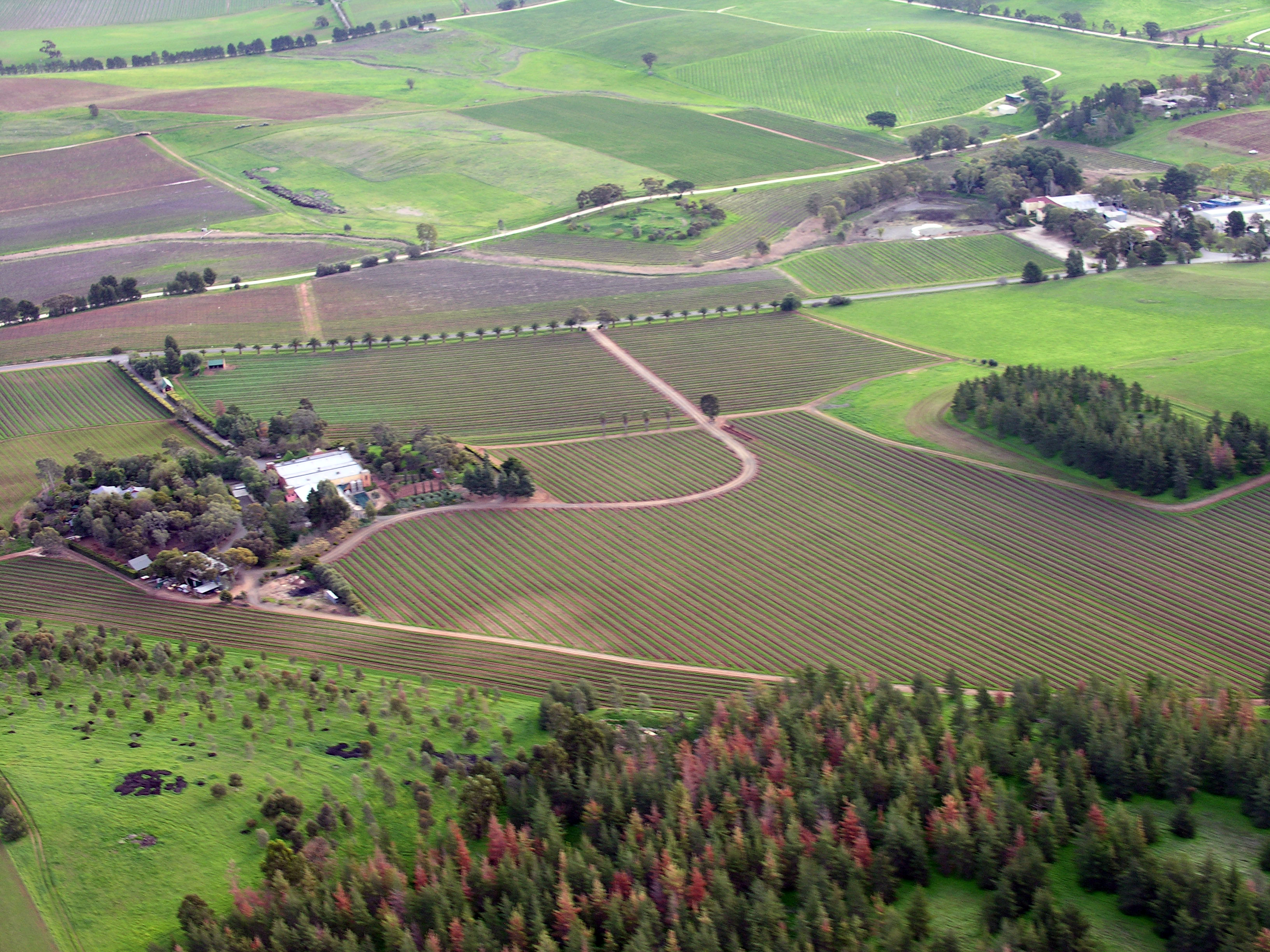
Barossa Valley in South Australia

Some well-known wine-producing regions include:

South Australia wine regions

- Adelaide Hills
- Barossa Valley
- Clare Valley
- Coonawarra
- Eden Valley
- Langhorne Creek
- McLaren Vale
- Padthaway
- Riverland
- Southern Fleurieu
- Wrattonbully
- Southern Eyre and Yorke Peninsulas
- Currency Creek
- Kangaroo Island

Victoria wine regions

- Alpine Valleys
- Beechworth
- Gippsland
- Goulburn Valley
- Grampians
- Heathcote wine region
- Henty
- Mornington Peninsula
- Pyrenees
- Rutherglen
- Strathbogie wine region
- Yarra Valley
- King Valley
- Bendigo
- Glenrowan wine region

New South Wales wine regions

- Hunter Valley
- Mudgee
- Orange
- Riverina
- New England
- Southern Highlands
- Shoalhaven Coast

Western Australia wine regions

Greater Perth:

- Perth Hills
- Peel
- Swan Valley

South Western Australia:

- Blackwood Valley
- Geographe
- Manjimup
- Margaret River
- Pemberton
- Great Southern and its subregions Albany, Denmark, Frankland River, Mount Barker, Porongurup

Tasmania wine regions

- Tamar Valley
- Derwent Valley
- Huon Valley / Channel
- Coal River Valley
- Pipers River
- East Coast
- North West

Queensland wine

- Granite Belt

== Export markets ==
Monthly value of Australian alcoholic beverage exports since 1988 (A$millions)

Quarterly value of wine imports since 2000 (A$thousands)

The Australian Wine export market was worth 2.8 billion Australian dollars (A$) a year in June 2007, having grown at 9%pa. Of this about A$2 billion is accounted for by North America and the UK. 2007 statistics for the North American market show that Australian wine accounted for a 17% share of the total value of US imported wine, behind France with 31% and Italy with 28%.

New marketing strategies developed for the key UK market encouraged customers to explore premium Australian brands while maintaining sales of the lower-margin high-volume brands, following research that indicated a celebratory dinner was more likely to be accompanied by an inferior French wine than a premium Australian wine. This is partly due to exchange rate fluctuations, making Australian wines appear much cheaper than French wines in the UK and hence perceived as being of poorer quality. While this situation may be somewhat mitigated by the continued rise in the Australian dollar during 2010, the stronger currency threatens to weaken Australian exports to the crucial US market.

Australian wine accounts for a very large imported wine market share in South Asian countries and is the second largest imported wine in India with a market share of 16%. Australia was China's largest supplier of imported wine, a standing achieved in part by free-trade agreements established between the two countries. However, in retaliation for the Australian government's support of an inquiry into the origins of Covid-19, China imposed tariffs of over 200% on Australian wine in October 2020. These tariffs have been lifted as of April 2024 following an improvement in relations between the two countries.

Canada is the fourth-largest export market for Australian wines with the major exporting provinces being British Columbia, Ontario and Quebec. With the restrictions on the sale of Australian wine being removed in British Columbia, Australian wine will be on more shelves in the province with lower tariffs.

== Government spending ==
Australian wine research and production is supported by the government through partnerships with the publicly funded CSIRO and Wine Australia worth $18 million. In an average year, alcohol production in Australia is estimated to produce between $3.3 and $5.5 billion in taxable income.

== See also ==
- Agriculture in Australia
- Australian and New Zealand Wine Industry Journal
- Australian Wine Research Institute
- Australian Society of Viticulture and Oenology
- Australia's First Families of Wine
- Good Food & Wine Show
- Huon Hooke (wine critic)
- Langton's Classification of Australian Wine
- National Wine Centre of Australia
