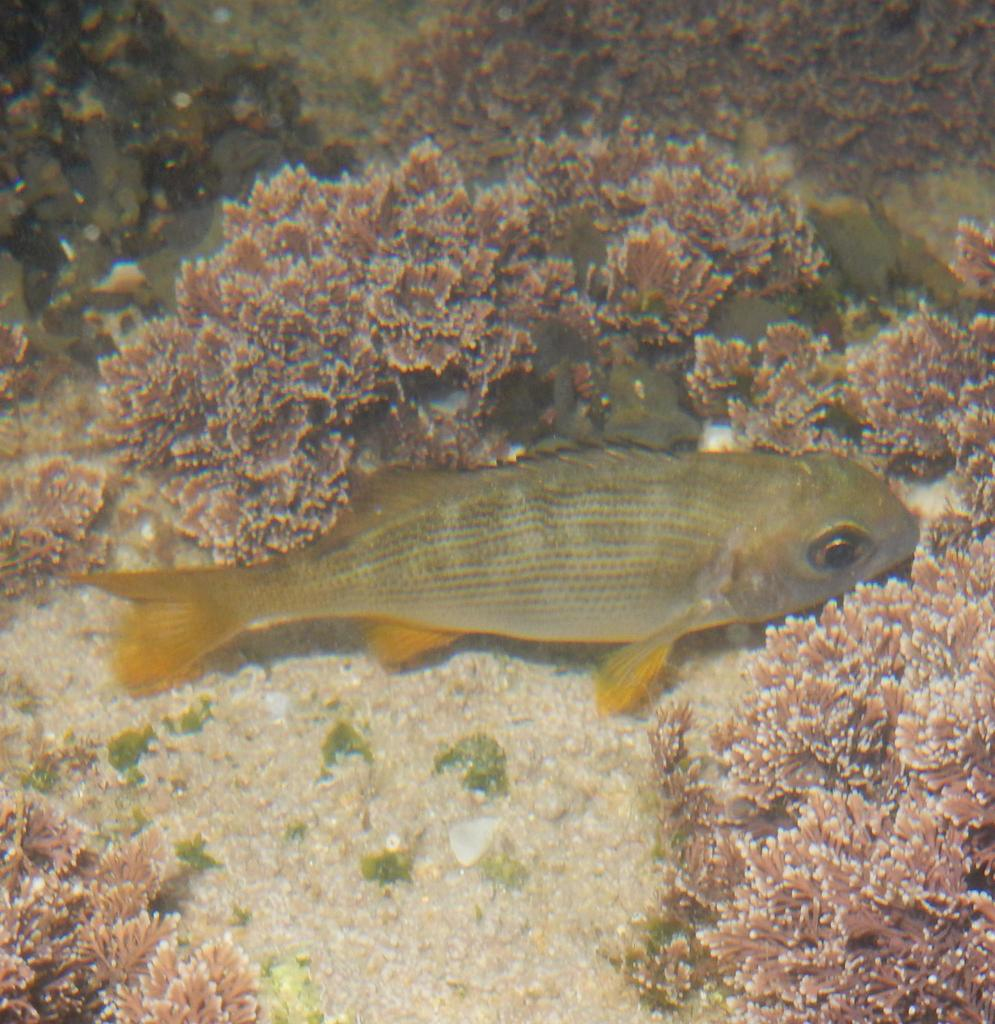

Conservation status
- Near Threatened (IUCN 3.1)

Scientific classification
- Kingdom: Animalia
- Phylum: Chordata
- Class: Actinopterygii
- Order: Acanthuriformes
- Family: Sparidae
- Genus: Sparodon; J. L. B. Smith, 1938
- Species: S. durbanensis

Binomial name
- Sparodon durbanensis (Castelnau, 1861)

Synonyms
- Species synonymy: Sargus durbanensis Castelnau, 1861

= Sparodon =

Genus of fishes

Sparodon, commonly known as the white musselcracker, musselcracker seabream, mussel cracker seabream, brusher, or cracker. is a monotypic genus of fish in the family Sparidae. The type and only known species, Sparodon durbanensis, was first described and named by François Louis Nompar de Caumont de Laporte, comte de Castelnau, in 1861.

The fish is edible and is an important food source in southern Africa.

== Taxonomy ==
Sparodon was first proposed as a monospecific genus in 1938 by the South African ichthyologist James Leonard Brierley Smith with its only species being Sargus durbanensis. Sargus durbanensis was first formally described in 1861 by the French naturalist Francis de Laporte de Castelnau with its type locality given as Durban, South Africa. The genus Sparodon is placed in the family Sparidae within the order Spariformes by the 5th edition of Fishes of the World. Some authorities classify this genus in the subfamily Sparinae, but the 5th edition of Fishes of the World does not recognise subfamilies within the Sparidae.

== Etymology ==
Sparidentex combines spar, as in Sparidae, with odon, meaning "tooth", an allusion to the four incisor-like teeth in the front of each jaw, particularly the enlarged, curved middle two teeth in each jaw. The specific name refers to the type locality.

== Description ==
S. durbanensis can grow up to a length of 120 centimetres (47 in), and a weight of around 22 kilograms (50 lb). Its head and body are colored silver or gray. It has darker colored fins and a white belly. It has large teeth and has strongly developed jaws, allowing it to eat its prey easier. The shape of the body is an elongated oval with a depth that fits into its standard length 2,5 to 3 times. The lateral line contains between 58 and 61 scales. There are no scales in the area between the eyes or on the flange of the preoperculum. The dorsal fin is supported by 11 spines and 11 or 12 soft rays while the anal fin has 3 spines and 10 soft rays.

== Behavior ==
S. durbanensis mostly stays in shallow reefs as a juvenile, in depths no greater than 12 metres (40 ft). Some adult specimens are thought to migrate northeasterly seasonally. The average length of time between two generations, called the generation time, is 13 years for the species. Young typically spawn from August to January. They can live to be around 31 years old. The species reaches 50% maturity when it is around 5 1/2 years old.

S. durbanensis eats a variety of invertebrates commonly known as shellfish, including sea urchins, crustaceans, gastropods, and bristle worms. In addition to this, it has also been known to eat Eukaryotes in the Chlorophyta division, a group of green algae.

== Distribution and conservation ==
S. durbanensis is found in the South-east Atlantic Ocean. It mostly inhabits Southern Africa, and has not been recorded further north than the KwaZulu-Natal province. It lives in shallow coastal tropical waters, in depths of up to 80 metres (260 ft). The population of S. durbanensis is currently declining. It is listed as "Near Threatened" by IUCN. There are currently several conservation actions taking place, most notability one which limits people to two fish per day.
