= Australian and New Zealand Wine Industry Journal =

- Categories: Oenology, Viticulture
- Frequency: Bi-monthly
- Publisher: Winetitles Pty Ltd
- Founded: 1986
- Final issue: 2010
- Country: Australia
- Based in: Goodwood, South Australia
- Language: English
- Website: winetitles.com.au/wvj/
- ISSN: 0819-2421

The Australian and New Zealand Wine Industry Journal published a wide range of articles from technical and scientific papers to practical advice and the latest news on research and development. The journal was issued six times a year and featured practical winemaking, practical grape growing, articles on wine regions and wine styles, vintage reports, marketing, finance and management, research papers, and industry news and analyses. In 2010 the magazine merged with Australian Viticulture to form a new wine magazine, Wine & Viticulture Journal. In 2024, the last issue (Winter 2024) was published, its content integrated into the Grapegrower & Winemaker sister journal.

== See also ==
- Australian wine
- New Zealand wine
