= National Wine Centre of Australia =

Winemaking exhibition building in Australia

- National Wine Centre in 2026

General information
- Location: North Terrace, Adelaide, South Australia, Australia
- Coordinates: 34°55′10″S 138°36′51″E
- Opened: 6 October 2001
- Client: Government of South Australia
- Landlord: University of Adelaide

Design and construction
- Architect: Philip Cox
- Architecture firm: Cox Grieve Gillett

Website
- nationalwinecentre.com.au

The National Wine Centre of Australia (commonly the "Wine Centre") is a public exhibition building about winemaking and its industry in South Australia, opened in 2001. It contains an interactive permanent exhibition of winemaking, introducing visitors to the technology, varieties and styles of wine. It also has a wine tasting area, giving visitors the opportunity to taste and compare wines from different areas of Australia.

The Wine Centre is situated at the eastern end of North Terrace, Adelaide in the east parklands and adjacent to the Adelaide Botanic Gardens. The building designed by Cox Grieve Gillett uses building materials to reflect items used in making wine. The exterior of the building looks like a section of a wine barrel. Outside the building are rows of grapevines, showing seven different varieties of grapes to curious visitors who normally would not have access to a vineyard to see the differences for themselves.

== History ==
Its development by the Olsen Liberal State Government was shrouded in controversy and it was labelled as a white elephant by the Opposition. It eventually opened on 6 October 2001 after enabling legislation created the concept in the National Wine Centre Act (1997). After a number of problems with funding, management and profitability, the Wine Centre operation was given to the University of Adelaide on 12 September 2003 on a 40-year lease. It now offers some of the university's oenology courses, as well as the public face of the wine industry in Australia.

== See also ==
- South Australian food and drink
- Australian Grape and Wine Authority
