= Australian Grape and Wine Authority =

Organisation in Australia

Authority overview
- Formed: 1 July 2014
- Preceding agencies: Wine Australia; Grape and Wine Research and Development Corporation
- Jurisdiction: Government of Australia
- Headquarters: Adelaide, South Australia; 34.919°S 138.614°E
- Website: www.wineaustralia.com

The Australian Grape and Wine Authority is responsible for research, development and extension of the wine industry in Australia, including protecting the reputation of Australian wine. It was created in 2014 by merging Wine Australia and the Grape and Wine Research and Development Corporation.

The Australian Grape and Wine Authority includes a regulatory body that ensures wine production complies with the Food Standards Code and ensures that information on labels of Australian wine is accurate, including geographic indicators. In 2015, in an interview to Harpers, Brian Walsh, chairman of the AGWA said the goal of the organisation was to develop a sustainable industry.

== See also ==
- Australian wine
