= Australian Society of Viticulture and Oenology =

Wine organisation in Australia

Based in Glen Osmond, South Australia, the Australian Society of Viticulture and Oenology (ASVO) is a non-political organization that was founded in 1980 to serve the interests of practicing winemakers and viticulturists by encouraging the exchange of technical information. It publishes the Australian Journal of Grape and Wine Research and has over 1,300 individual and corporate members.

The organisation awards the ASVO (Australian Society of Viticulture and Oenology) awards for excellence.

The organisation in conjunction with Wiley (until 2023), publishes the Australian Journal of Grape and Wine Research. The journal is owned directly by ASVO. The publication publishes research on viticulture-related technology, production aspects of wine making as well as wine science such as biochemical, microbiological, molecular sciences.

== Objectives ==
The organization's major objectives are:

- "To encourage, stimulate, support and promote the dissemination of research or technical information in viticulture and oenology or other sciences directly applied to viticulture and oenology;
- To provide a forum for the presentation, discussion and publication of such research and technological developments for the advancement of science and promotion of common welfare; and
- To promote education in viticulture and oenology and help ensure and maintain the highest standards of quality for such educational objectives."

== See also ==
- Australian wine
- Australian Grape and Wine Authority
