= Charles Melton Wines =

Australian winery based in Tanunda

Coordinates: 34.560612°S 138.968275°E

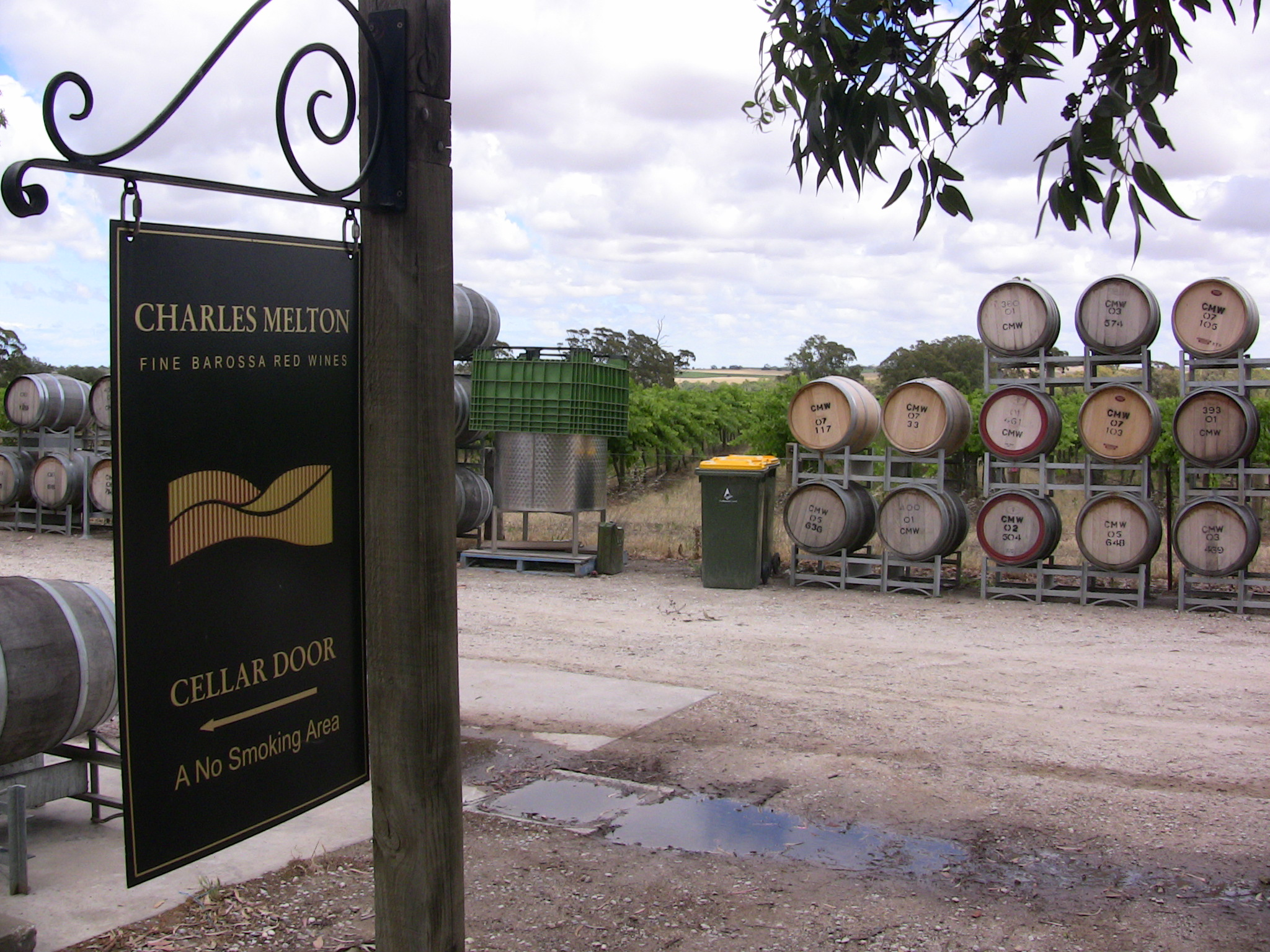
- Location: Tanunda, South Australia, Australia
- Appellation: Barossa Valley (wine)
- Founded: 1986
- Key people: Charles Melton; Virginia Weckert
- Cases/yr: 15,000
- Known for: Nine Popes
- Varietals: Grenache, Shiraz, Cabernet Sauvignon
- Website: http://www.charlesmeltonwines.com.au

Charles Melton Wines is an Australian winery based in Tanunda, within the Barossa Valley wine region of South Australia.

== History ==
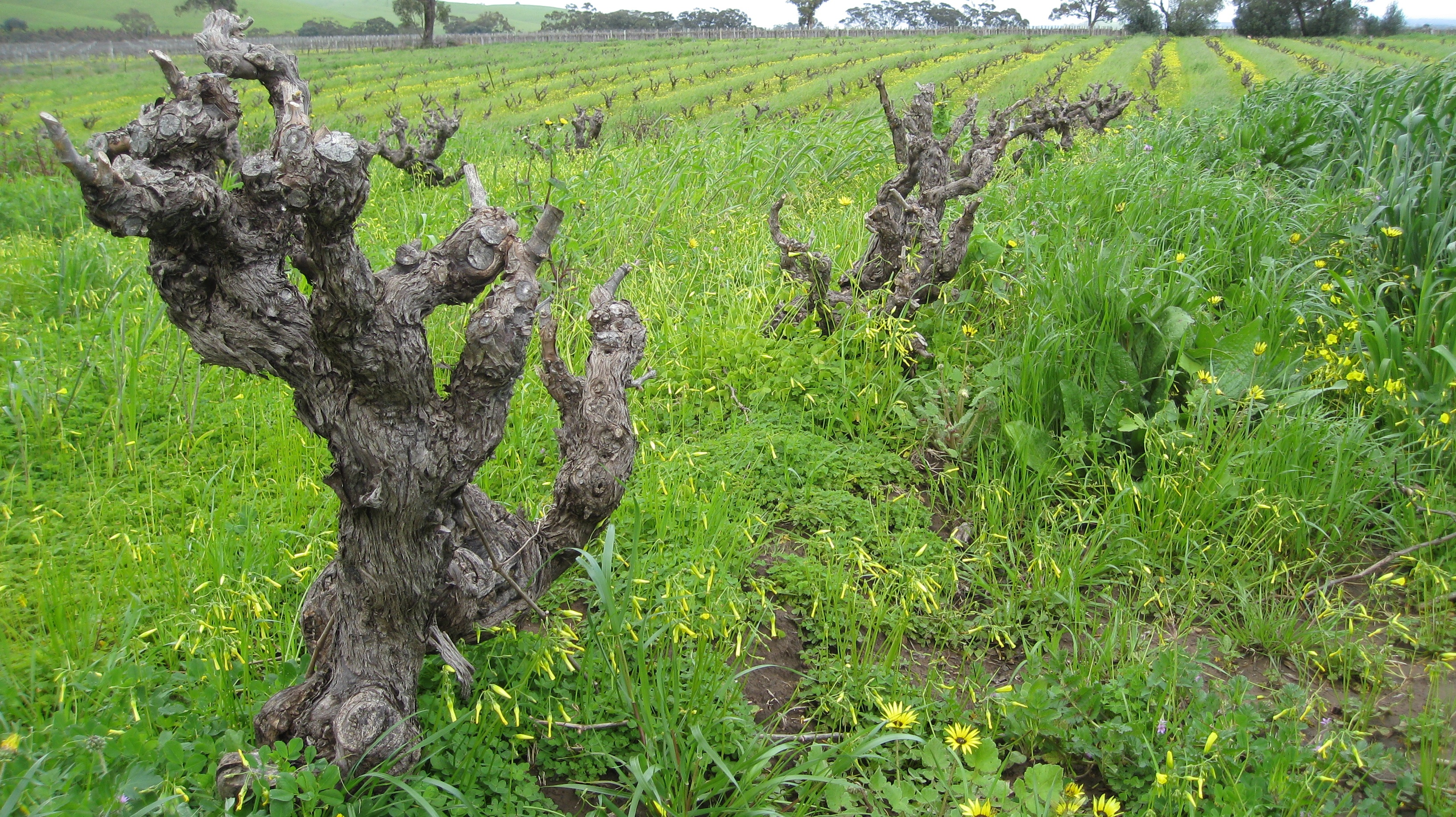
90-year-old Grenache vines at Charles Melton Winery

Charles Melton was first introduced to winemaking as a career at Hurlstone Agricultural High School. He worked as a cellar hand at Krondorf Wines between 1974 and 1976 before moving to Saltram Wines to work with Andrew Wigan and Peter Lehmann. In 1979, Saltram was sold to Seagram, and Melton followed Lehmann to work at the newly established Peter Lehmann Wines.

Melton worked at Peter Lehmann Wines until 1986 when he and his wife Virginia established their own, Charles Melton Wines. Charles Melton had been credited as of 1999 as "single-handedly reviving the grenache grape in Australia". On 20 October 2007, Melton was inducted into the "Barons of the Barossa", an organisation that recognises people who have made a significant contribution to the Barossa Valley wine community. In 2009, Charles Melton Wines had a new winery and barrel shed built. In 2017, its 2014 Nine Popes wine won awards at the International Wine Challenge London.

Sophie Melton became winemaker in 2022. In November 2025, 95% of the company's fruit was grown on its estate. Its three key varieties were Grenache, Shiraz, and Cabernet.

== Wines ==
About 15,000 cases of wine are produced each vintage.

The best-known wine produced by Charles Melton is the Nine Popes. It is a blend of Grenache, Shiraz and Mourvedre. The first vintage of this wine was produced in 1988 and was the first GSM blend made in the Barossa Valley. Langton's Classification of Australian Wine placed this wine at the level of "Excellent" in 2000 and "Distinguished" in 2005 and 2010.

A rosé style wine made from Grenache, named Rose of Virginia after his wife, "is regarded as one of Australia's best roses".

== See also ==
- Australian wine
- Cult wine
- South Australian food and drink
- List of wineries in the Barossa Valley
