= Benno Seppelt =

Australian winemaker

Oscar Benno Pedro Seppelt (13 July 1846 – 11 May 1931), known universally as Benno Seppelt, was a South Australian winemaker who helped the Barossa Valley become recognised as a premium wine region.

== History ==
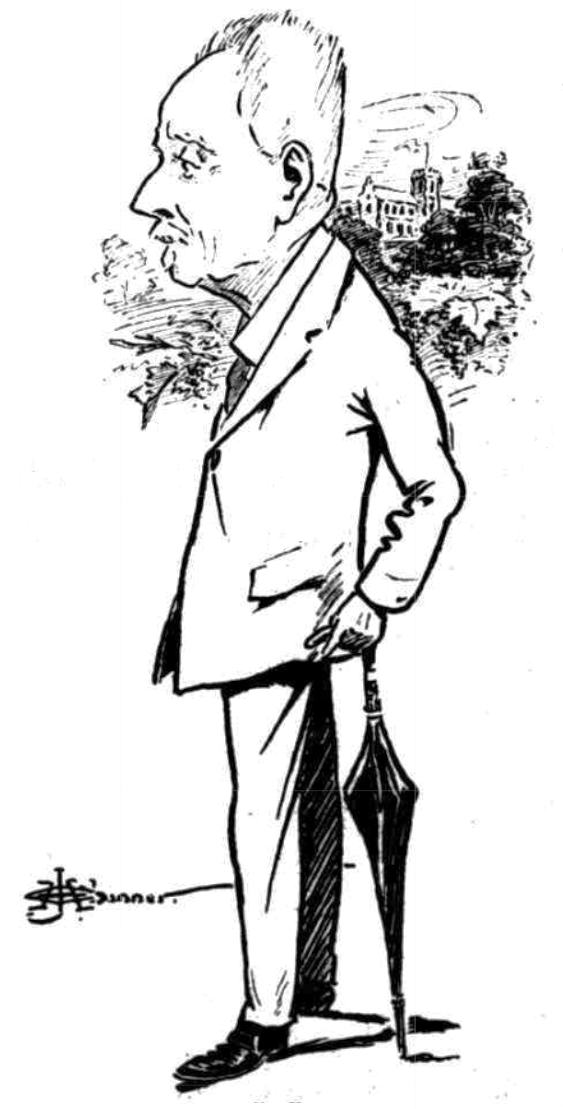
Caricature by J. H. Chinner

Joseph Ernst Seppelt (1813 – 29 January 1868), his wife Johanna Charlotte Clementine Seppelt, née Held (1807 – 13 April 1870), and their children Ottilie Clementine Seppelt, later Kruger (c. 1840 – 4 June 1920), Oscar Benno Pedro "Benno" Seppelt, and Victor Hugo Seppelt (1848–1882), emigrated to South Australia aboard the ship Emmy, arriving at Port Adelaide in January 1850. Joseph Seppelt founded the winery Seppeltsfield, but died while it was still in its infancy. His son Benno, who was educated at Tanunda, and studied chemistry under C. W. L. Muecke. took over management of the business on his father's death, and inherited the major portion of his estate.

The grapes from Seppelt's vineyards, and much from other growers, were made into wines as a precursor to distillation. J. E. Seppelt, as the business continued to be named, was in 1870 producing "syrups, cordials, and spirits in great variety." At the 1872 Wine Show, B. Seppelt's rum was judged highly, a relief no doubt after some bad publicity arising from what appears to have been malicious adulteration of exactly that product.

Seppelt was an excellent manager, far-seeing and inventive. He progressively expanded the acreage under vines, largely with Doradillo (Blanquette) and "Mataro" (Carignan) grapes, on his 230-hectare (560-acre) property, of which the greatest area was set aside for grazing their 500 sheep, and growing hay for eight horses.

In 1876 he was able to report that he was sole proprietor of the business

In 1877 he installed a large (35 feet (11 m) high) new distillation plant, largely to his own design, made by Rundle Street coppersmiths Polack & Liebl. It was housed in a separate 52 feet (16 m) high building, and could produce 200 imperial gallons (910 L) per day into a bonded store of 10,000 imperial gallons (45,000 L) capacity on-site. Seppeltsfield boasted an up-to-date chemistry laboratory for Seppelt's own investigations.

The business was known as B. Seppelt & Sons from 1876 and became B. Seppelt & Sons Ltd in May 1902.

Seppelt retired in 1916 and his son Oscar Seppelt was appointed Managing Director. He died in 1935.

== Family ==
Benno Seppelt married Sophie Helene Henriette Schroeder (1852–1925) on 23 November 1870. They had a total of 16 children, including:

- Oscar Benno Seppelt (13 July 1873 – 1963) married Hedwig Cecilia Leichtermuller (1868–1955) on 25 June 1895, took over management from his father
- Flora Eugenie Seppelt (1874 – 1957) married William Kimber in 1895
- Clara Blanca Seppelt (1876–1963)
- Camillo Pedro Seppelt (26 August 1877 – c. 10 May 1935) married Winifred Stokes Bagshaw (1895–1970) on 24 August 1910. He was in charge of Chateau Tanunda.
- (Udo) Waldemar Seppelt (1879–1964) married (Helen) Gertrude Howe (1883–1953) on 26 October 1905. Administrator with Seppelts. Gertrude was daughter of J. H. Howe MLC

- Ian Howe Seppelt (1909–1973)

- Selma Melitta Seppelt (1880–1940)
- Xaver Arno Seppelt (23 March 1882 – 11 June 1963) married Matilda "Tillie" Evans (1884–1962) on 30 August 1910. He was in charge of the Sydney office.
- Leo Renato Seppelt (1883–1942) married Audrey Vera Tardif (1884–1966) on 14 April 1908. He was employed in the Seppeltsfield office.
- Marco Dominico Seppelt (1886– ) engineer
- Norbert Erno Seppelt L.R.C.P.E., L.R.C.S.E., L.R.F.P., S.G (1887–1970) married Victoria Maud ?? (1898–1967) medical doctor in New South Wales
- J (Joseph) Gerold Seppelt A.S.A.I.A. (1888–1974) married Therese Marie "Trazel" Schneider on 29 April 1929. Architect
- Vera Viola Seppelt (1890–1957) married Clement William Hingston Lake in 1916
- (Tuisko) Turso Seppelt (1891–1957) married Amy Katherine St John Wood (1891 – 24 December 1940) on 9 February 1914. He was in charge of Seppelts Collins Street, Melbourne office, also manufacturer of moulded paper containers.
