= Chateau Yaldara =

Australian winery

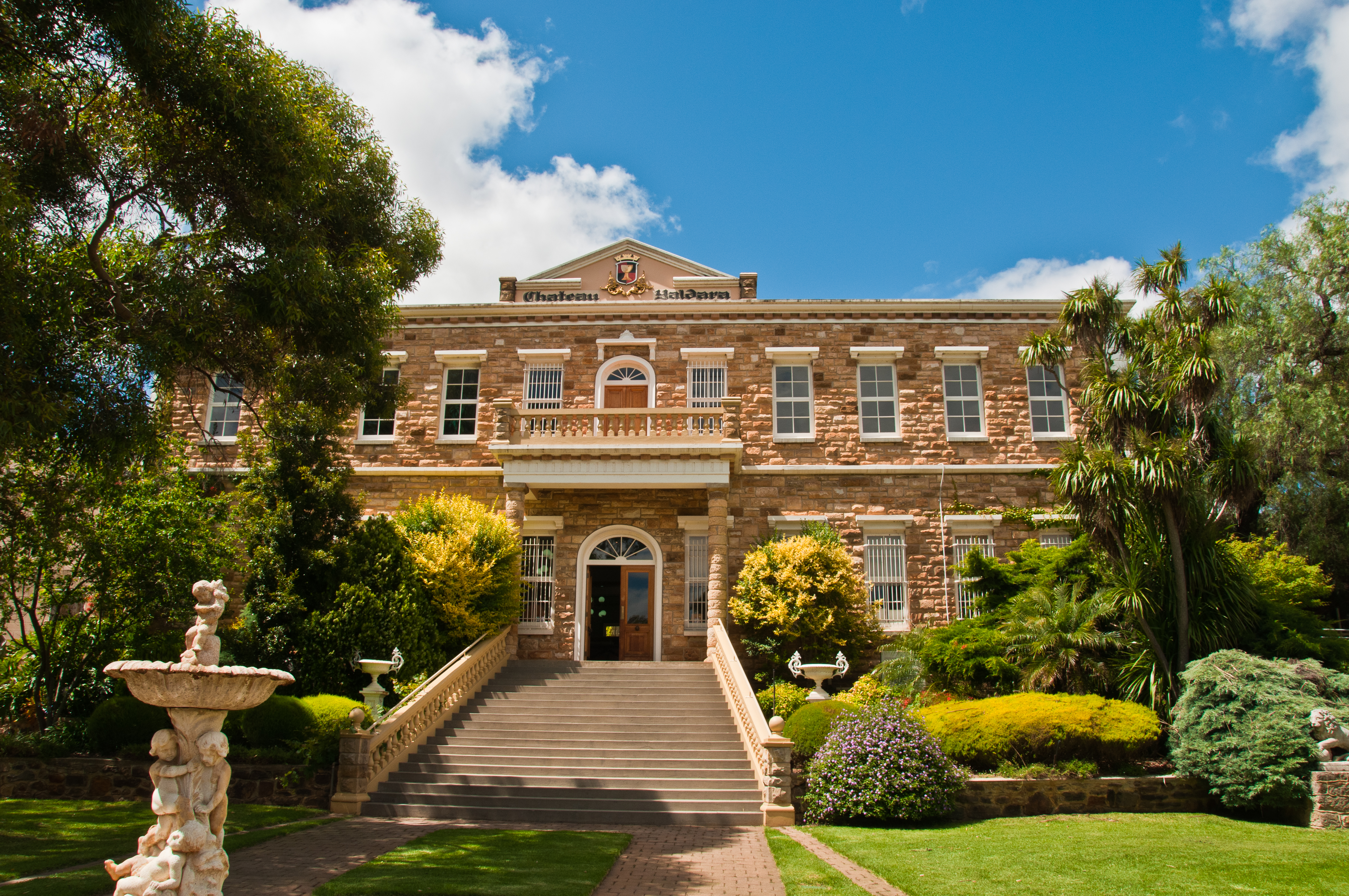
- Chateau Yaldara
- Location: Lyndoch, South Australia, Australia
- Coordinates: 34°34′34″S 138°52′28″E
- Wine region: Barossa Valley
- Founded: 1947
- Key people: Hermann Thumm (founder); Zhitai Wang (1847 Wines); Kuifen Wang (1847 Wines)
- Parent company: 1847 Wines
- Varietals: Shiraz, Cabernet Sauvignon, Grenache, Pinot gris, Sauvignon blanc,
- Other products: Tawny
- Tasting: Seven days 10am to 5pm
- Website: 1847wines.com

Chateau Yaldara is an Australian winery located near Lyndoch, South Australia, in the historic Barossa Valley wine-growing region.

== History ==
The winery was founded by the Hermann Thumm in 1947 after he emigrated to Australia from Europe in 1946. The site chosen for the winery was on the banks of the North Para River at an old flour mill dating back to 1855. The winery was named "Yaldara" after the local Aboriginal word meaning "sparkling".

The Seekers filmed the video for Turn, Turn, Turn at the winery in 1967.

After over fifty years ownership, Hermann Thumm sold the winery in 1999 to the wine company McGuigan Wines. In 2014, it was purchased by 1847, a wine company owned by Zhitai Wang of New South Wales and Kuifen Wang of Qingdao, in Shandong, China.

== See also ==
- Australian wine
- Cult wine
- South Australian food and drink
- List of wineries in the Barossa Valley
