= Schiller Vineyards =

- Location: Barossa Valley, South Australia, Australia
- Key people: Carl Friedrich Schiller, Matthew Grant Schiller (current proprietor)
- Varietals: Shiraz, Cabernet Sauvignon, Grenache
- Website: www.schillervineyards.com.au

Schiller Vineyards located in the wine region of Barossa Valley, South Australia; was established back in 1864 when the first vines were planted by Carl Freidrich Schiller. Carl arrived in 1855 to South Australia and settled in the small Barossa village of Light Pass. Schiller Vineyards today is a sixth generation family owned and operated vineyard, and producer of aged red wines.

== Vineyards ==
Schiller Vineyards have over 160 acres (65 ha) under vine, when harvested majority of the grapes are sold to premium Barossa wine producers for the production of quality table wines. The vineyard plantings consist of a number of varieties, and varying ages of vines. Plantings include Shiraz, Grenache, Cabernet Sauvignon, Merlot, Mourvèdre, Chardonnay, Riesling, and Semillon. Majority of the harvest are sold to large local Barossa wineries.

The Stonetrain vineyard planted to Shiraz and Cabernet Sauvignon are dedicated to Schiller Vineyards premium red blend, the Stonetrain. In 1917 the South Australian Railways purchased 3 acres (1.2 ha) of vineyard for the establishment of a railway line. This was later used to transport rock from the quarry, overlooking Light Pass, to Adelaide.

The Race Course vineyard is a 70-acre (280,000 m^{2}) property in the village of Light Pass was once regularly used by locals in the 1900s for racing their horses. The race meetings were discontinued in 1956 but locals still refer to this land as the racecourse. Schiller vineyards took the opportunity to purchase this parcel of land, and over half the property is now planted to vineyard. The S.G is a wine sourced from the Shiraz and Grenache vines which lay where the race horses once galloped.

== See also ==
- Australian wine
- Cult wine
- South Australian food and drink
- List of wineries in the Barossa Valley
