= Passion Pop =

Australian alcoholic beverage

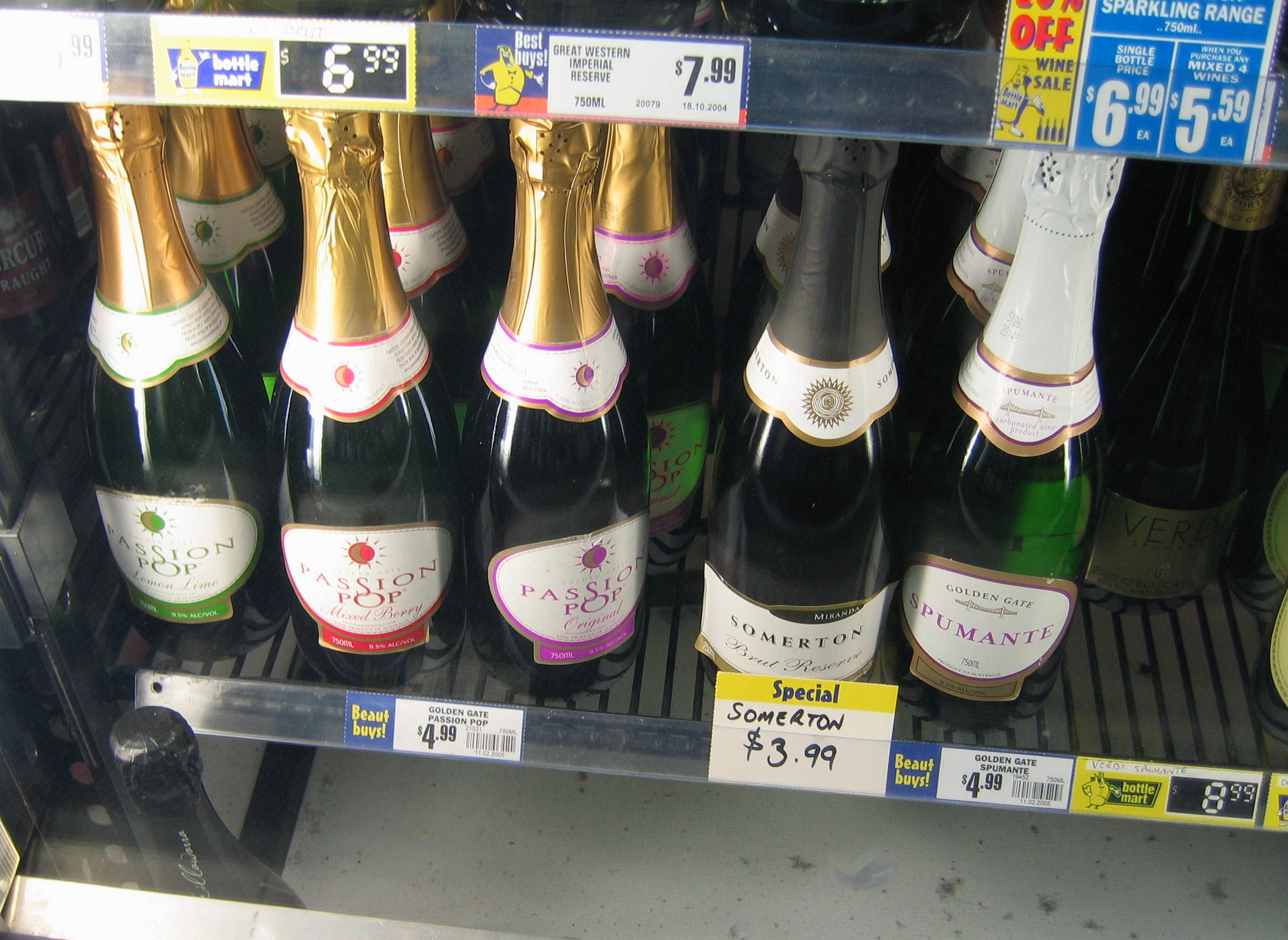
Three varieties of Passion Pop in an Australian bottle shop, alongside other budget wines.

Passion Pop is an Australian brand of alcoholic beverage classified as a carbonated, fruit-flavoured, sparkling wine. It is typically sold in 750ml glass champenoise bottles, similar to those used for other sparkling wines and champagnes.

The 'Original' variant is flavoured with passion fruit, while other available flavours include mixed berry, strawberry, peach, and watermelon.

Passion Pop was created by Frank "Pop" Miranda between 1977 and 1978 at the C-Seka winery in Griffith, New South Wales. The rights to the beverage were later acquired by Australian Vintage, which is currently responsible for its production and distribution.

== Description ==
Passion Pop is labelled as a carbonated, flavoured beverage. Each 9.5% alcohol, 750 mL, Champagne-style glass bottle contains 5.3 standard drinks. It was among the earliest beverage products in Australia to use a plastic stopper (or "cork").

== Public image ==
Passion Pop has been referenced in Australian popular culture, particularly in relation to its availability and appeal among younger consumers.

In 2008, the New South Wales Police Force launched a campaign named 'Operation Passion Pop', aimed at addressing underage drinking and the promotion of responsible alcohol consumption.

== Pop culture ==
The name "Passion Pop" has also appeared in film and television titles including:

- "Passion Pop" (2025): Directed by Chris Elena, this upcoming short film features actors Courtney Cavallaro, Emma Wright, Chantelle Jamieson, and Laneikka Denne. Specific plot details are limited.
- "Passion Pop" (2006): A surf film showcasing surfers such as Taj Burrow, Andy Irons, Joel Parkinson, James Wood, Jordy Smith,Shaun Cansdell, and Luke Dorrington.

== See also ==
- Australian wine
- Cult wine
