= Elderton Wines =

Winery in South Australia

- Elderton Wines logo
- Location: Barossa Valley, Nuriootpa, South Australia, Australia
- Wine region: Barossa Valley
- Founded: 1979
- First vines planted: 1894
- First vintage: 1981
- Key people: Cameron and Allister Ashmead
- Cases/yr: 30,000 (2011)
- Known for: Command Shiraz
- Varietals: Shiraz, Cabernet Sauvignon, Grenache, Mourvedre, Merlot, Chardonnay, Riesling, Semillon
- Tasting: Open daily
- Website: www.eldertonwines.com.au

Elderton Wines is an Australian winery in Nuriootpa, in the Barossa Valley. The company was founded by Neil and Lorraine Ashmead in 1979. The Elderton wines are made from grape varieties including red grapes Shiraz, Cabernet Sauvignon, Merlot as well as white grapes Riesling and Chardonnay.

== History ==
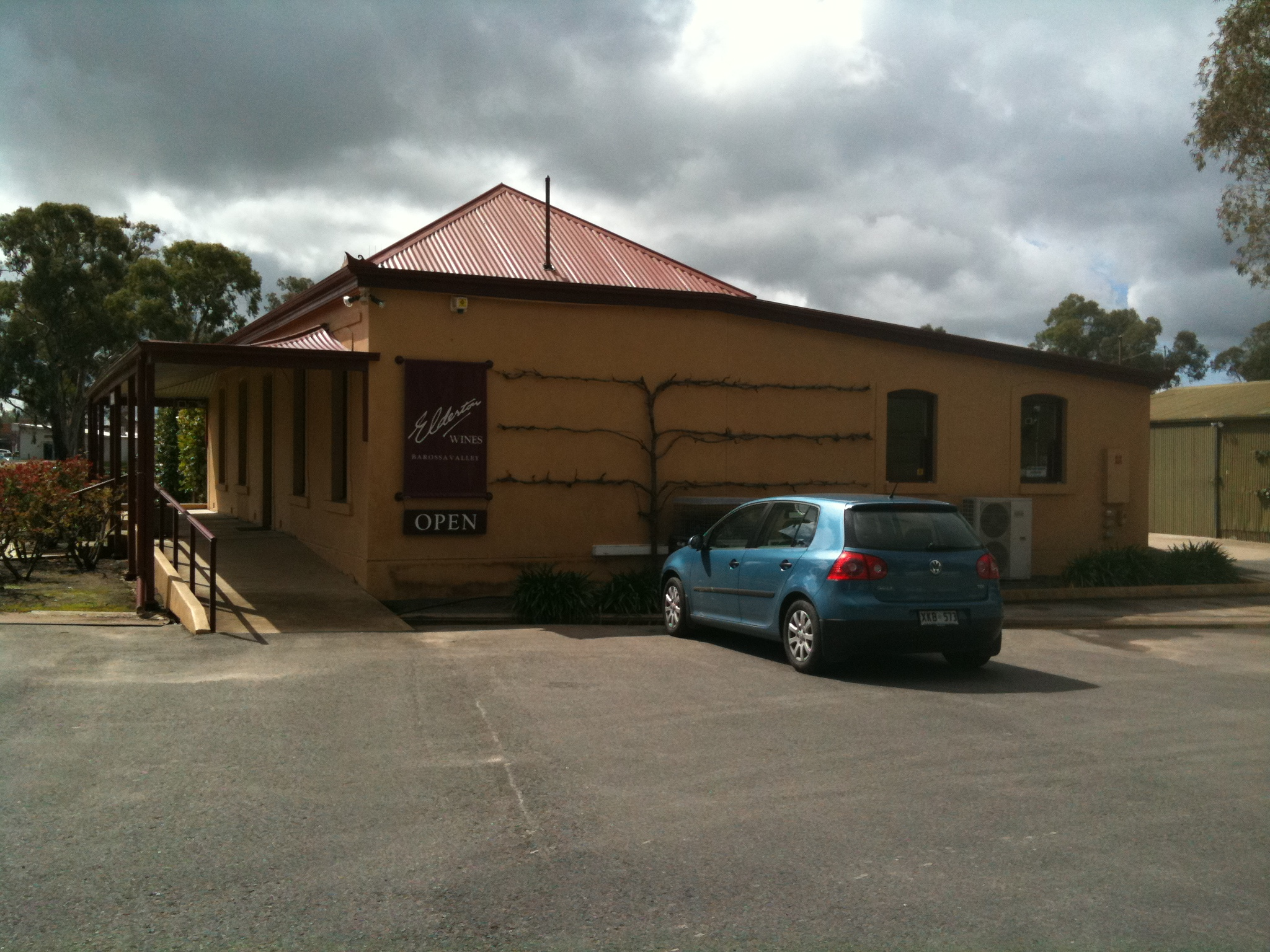
Elderton Wines cellar door in 2010

In the late 1970s Neil and Lorraine Ashmead returned from the Middle East, settling on the Barossa Valley as the place to raise their sons. In 1979 the Ashmeads purchased the Estate vineyard, which was planted in 1894 by Samuel Elderton Tolley. The family restored the derelict vineyard and the first vintage of wine was produced in 1982.

In 1993, Elderton won the Jimmy Watson Trophy. Elderton also won the World’s Best Shiraz Trophy at the 2000 London International Wine & Spirits Competition. Neil and Lorraine Ashmead's sons Cameron and Allister took control of the business in 2003. They run the business with a focus on sustainability.

In 2017, the cellar door tasting rooms and sales outlet were moved into the old homestead surrounded by vineyards.

== Wines ==
Elderton produces around 30,000 cases of wine per year, depending on vintage conditions. The majority of the production is red wine. The wines are made to show varietal character, regional definition and to show the unique personalities of the Elderton team . Command Shiraz is Elderton's flagship wine, produced from a single vineyard of Shiraz vines that were planted around 1894.

== See also ==
- Australian wine
- Cult wine
- South Australian food and drink
- List of wineries in the Barossa Valley
