= Torbreck =

Winery in South Australia

Coordinates: 34°28′33.9″S 138°56′50.9″E

- Location: Marananga, South Australia, Australia, South Australia, Australia
- Wine region: Barossa Valley
- Founded: 1994
- First vines planted: 1850's
- Key people: Pete Kight, Ian Hongell
- Cases/yr: 70,000+
- Known for: The Laird, RunRig
- Varietals: Shiraz, Grenache, Mataró, Semillon, Viognier, Marsanne, Roussanne
- Distribution: International
- Tasting: Open 7 days, 10am to 5 pm
- Website: www.torbreck.com

Torbreck is an Australian winery in the Barossa Valley, established in 1994. The winery was named one of the World's Top 100 Wine Estates by Robert Parker. The winery is named after a forest in Scotland where the original owner Dave Powell worked as a lumberjack. The wines are made in a style emulating those of the Rhône Valley and are made from various grapes including red grapes Shiraz, Grenache and Mataró as well as white grapes Viognier, Roussanne and Marsanne.

== History ==
Torbreck Vintners was founded by David Powell in 1994. In late 2002 the estate was placed into receivership. Torbreck was purchased by Australian businessman Jack Cowin from receivers for 6.5 million Australian dollars, with Powell retained as winemaker and managing director. In 2008, the estate was acquired by Peter Kight, the owner of Quivira Winery in Sonoma County's Dry Creek Valley in California. Powell left the winery in 2013.

In 2016 Barossa winemaker Ian Hongell was appointed Chief Winemaker, and subsequently General Manager. Along with Viticulturalist Nigel Bleischke, they have further championed Torbreck's long-term dedication to old vine Barossa vineyards and heritage clones, and incorporated sustainable vineyard practices across their vineyards.

In 2017, Torbreck expanded the original settler’s cottage cellar door to become an international guest centre, and now exports wines to over 50 countries.

In 2024, Torbreck completed the renovation of the Hillside Vineyard, including vineyard rejuvenation, and restoration of the heritage-listed 1860's winery buildings into private members' event, tour & tasting facilities, and private vineyard accommodation

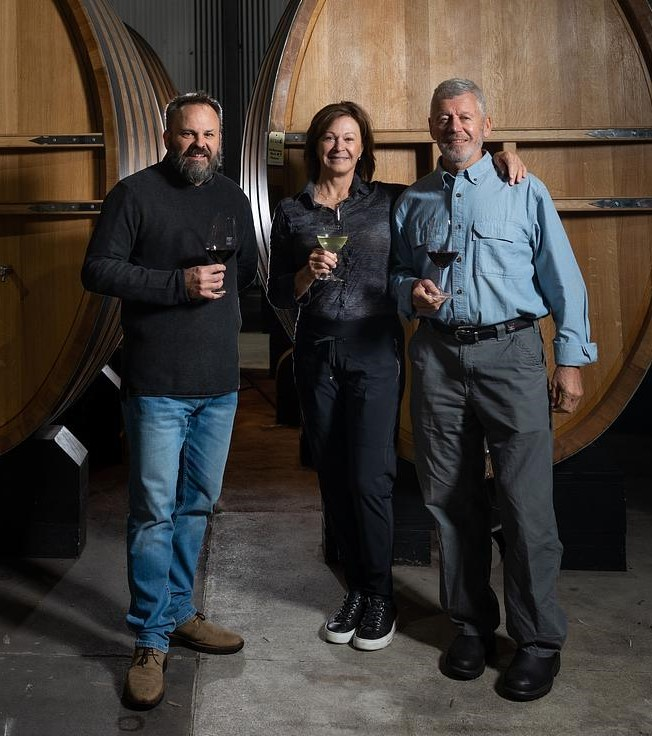
Torbreck's Chief Winemaker Ian Hongell with owners Terri & Pete Kight

The winery was named "Torbreck" after the forest near Inverness in Scotland, and many of the labels have a Scottish connection. The first wine made under the Torbreck label was the 1995 RunRig, with the wine released in 1997. A favorable review of the 1996 RunRig in the June, 1999 issue of The Wine Advocate created intense consumer interest in the international wine collector community, resulting in this and subsequent releases being highly allocated.

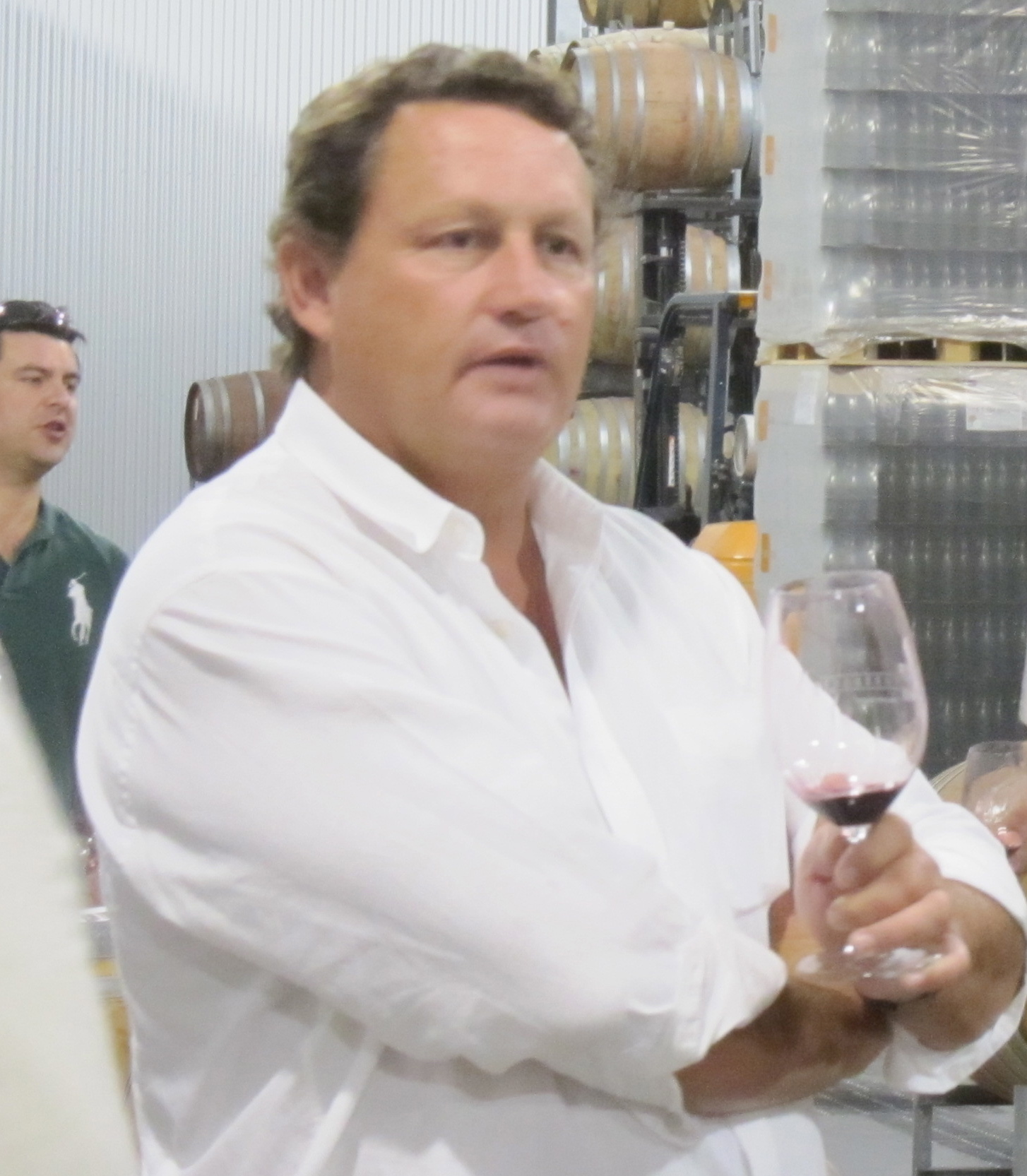
Dave Powell, founder and former chief winemaker

The Torbreck endeavour is based around the classic Barossa Valley grape varieties Shiraz, Grenache and Mataró. Although initially known primarily for its red wines, in recent years Torbreck has earned acclaim for wines made from the Viognier, Marsanne and Roussanne vines, initially planted in the estate's Descendent Vineyard. Although grapes from these vines were initially intended to be used solely as blending material in the high-end red wines, fruit from this vineyard is now used in Torbreck's white blends. The winery also produces a benchmark Barossa Semillon known as Woodcutter's, made from Madeira-clone vines ranging up to 100 years old.

Torbreck sources much of its fruit from its own Barossa Valley vineyards - the Hillside Vineyard, The Descendant Vineyard, The Laird Vineyard, Daylight Chamber Vineyard, and Keller Vineyard, as well selected family growers from throughout the Barossa Valley, many of whom have been supplying Torbreck with premium fruit from the early vintages.

== Wines ==
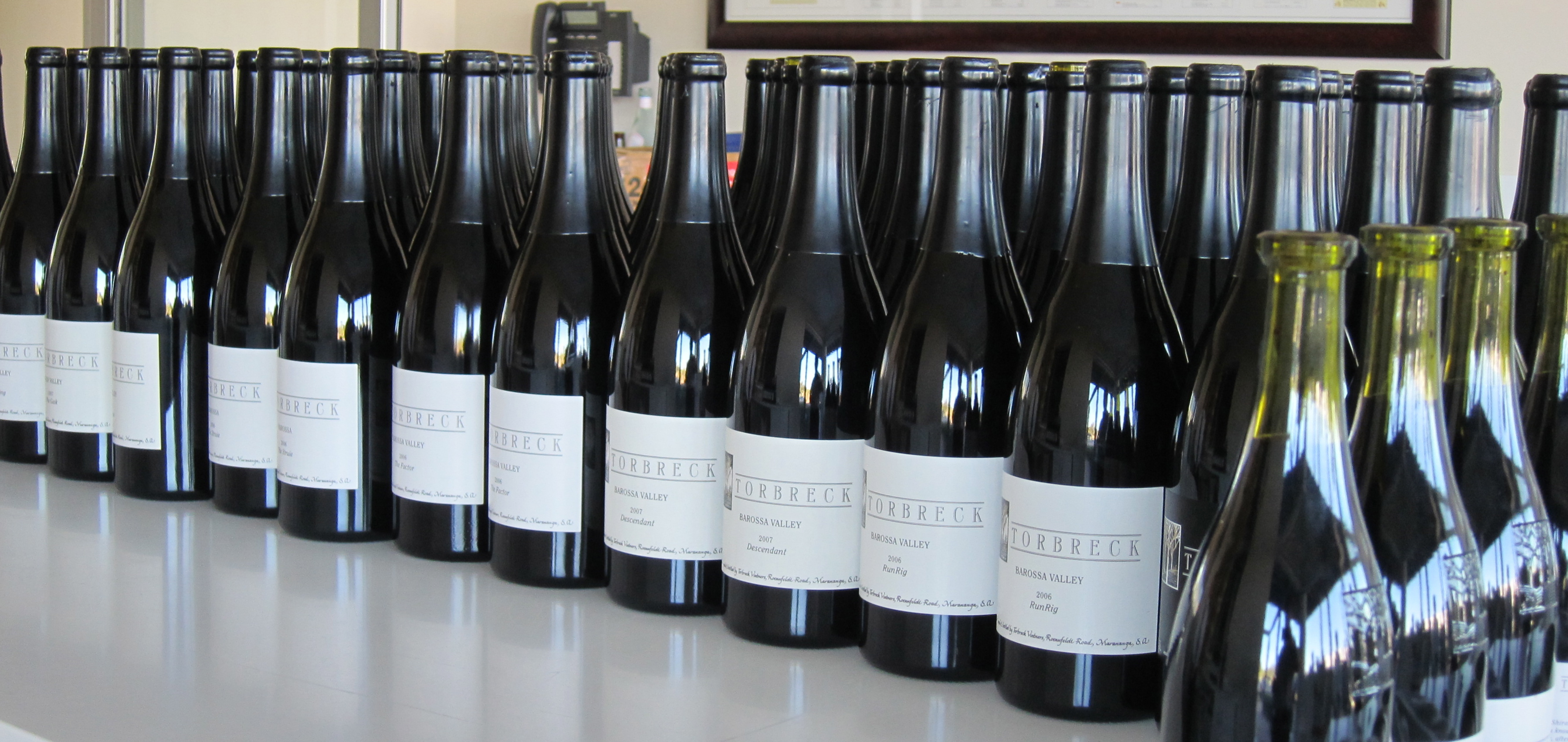
Torbreck magnums

Torbreck produces around 70,000 cases of wine per year, depending on vintage conditions. The majority of the production is red wine, but around 10% of the total production consists of white wine. When vintage conditions are favorable, a small amount of saignée Mataró Rosé is also produced.

The RunRig is Torbreck's flagship wine, produced from 120- to 170-year-old Shiraz vines and a small amount of Viognier. RunRig was included in the fourth edition of Langton's Classification of Australian Wine at the "Excellent" level and was named one of Australia's 25 "benchmark" wines by Wine Spectator magazine. The RunRig has had an unprecedented string of exceptional scores from The Wine Advocate, with no vintage scoring less than 95 points since the 1995 vintage, and no fewer than seven vintages of RunRig achieving a score of 99 points.

The Laird is a single vineyard wine sourced from The Laird Vineyard between Marananga and Seppeltsfield. Planted in 1958, this five-acre (two Hectare) site is considered to be among the finest vineyards in all of the Barossa. Grapes are hand-harvested and immediately brought to the Torbreck winery and gently de-stemmed into wooden & concrete open-top fermenters. After being basket pressed into stainless steel until primary fermentation is completed, the wine is moved into French oak barriques from Burgundian winemaker Dominique Laurent. Crafted from wood harvested from Forêt de Tronçais in Allier, the oak trunks were split by hand and then again hand split into staves, producing staves that are almost twice as thick as traditional machine-split staves. These were then aged outdoors for 48 to 54 months before being hand-made into barrels. The Laird is aged for 36 months in its own temperature-controlled stone shed. It is bottled unfined and unfiltered. In Scotland, the lord of the manor is referred to as "The Laird". When the 2005 vintage made its debut at A$700 in 2010, it was the most expensive bottle of wine ever released in Australia. The 2005 vintage received a perfect 100 point score from Lisa Perotti-Brown MW in the December 2010 issue of the Wine Advocate. The 2008 vintage also earned a perfect 100-point score from Perotti-Brown in the February 2013 issue of the Wine Advocate.

The Forebear is single vineyard wine sourced from a single c1850s planted shiraz vineyard at Torbreck's Hillside Vineyard, in the southern Barossa Valley. The 1-acre vineyard is Torbreck's oldest collection vines. The vineyard was established by Samuel Springbett, whose descendants owned and farmed Hillside until the 1950s. After hand-harvesting and gentle processing, the wine undergoes 24 months of aging in French barriques followed by a further three years of bottle maturation before release. The 2019 vintage is the inaugural release of the Forebear.

Both The Forebear and The Laird hold a place in Torbreck’s pursuit of single-site wines of significance and pedigree.

Descendant is produced from grapes grown on the winery property from vines planted in 1994 from cuttings selected from several of the vineyards that provide fruit for RunRig. The Shiraz is and Viognier are co-fermented (the usual blend is 92% Shiraz, 8% Viognier) and the wine is aged in neutral (ex-RunRig) barrels for 18 months before bottling. "Descendant" is named in honour of the donor vines that provided the cuttings for this vineyard.

The Factor shares many of its old vine fruit sources with RunRig. Made from 100% Shiraz, it spends 24 months in a combination of new and neutral French oak. The manager on a Scottish highland estate is known as The Factor.

The Struie is a 100% shiraz first released in 2001. It is made from vineyard sites in the Eden Valley (approximately 40-year-old vines) and the Barossa Valley (average 60-year-old vines). The elevation of the Eden Valley is some 200 metres higher than the Barossa and the cooler climate results in a longer growing season and thus more flavour development. Differences in soil between the Eden Valley and Barossa Valley also yield more distinctive varietal flavour characteristics, lower pH and higher acidity levels in the finished wine. The Struie is aged for 18 months in a combination of old and new French oak barriques prior to bottling. The Struie is the name of the craggy hilltop overlooking the Dornoch Firth in the Scottish Highlands.

The Gask is sourced from a number of elevated Shiraz sites in the Eden Valley . It is aged in neutral French oak barrels for 18 months. When he first saw the outcroppings surrounding the Knight's vineyard he was reminded of the stone burial grounds on the hills above the Torbreck forest that are part of the Gask Ridge.

Woodcutter's Shiraz is sourced from hand harvested and hand tended, low yielding vines from vineyards in the Marananga, Greenock, Ebenezer, Gomersal, Moppa, Lyndoch & Kalimna subregions of the Barossa Valley. It is then open-top fermented and gently basket pressed, and aged on fine lees for 12 months in large format seasoned barrels and foudres.

The Steading is a blend of 60% Grenache, 20% Shiraz, and 20% Mataró, all sourced from some 45 different vineyard sites from throughout the Barossa Valley. Each block was fermented and aged separately for 18 months in neutral French hogshead barrels. It's an homage to Chateauneuf-du-Pape. On a highland farm, the collection of barns, stables, and outbuildings is known as a Steading.

Cuvée Juveniles is made of Grenache, Mataró, Carigan, Counoise and Shiraz, created as a ‘Cotes Du Rhone’ inspired bistro wine from the classic Barossa varieties of from mostly unirrigated old vine vineyards.

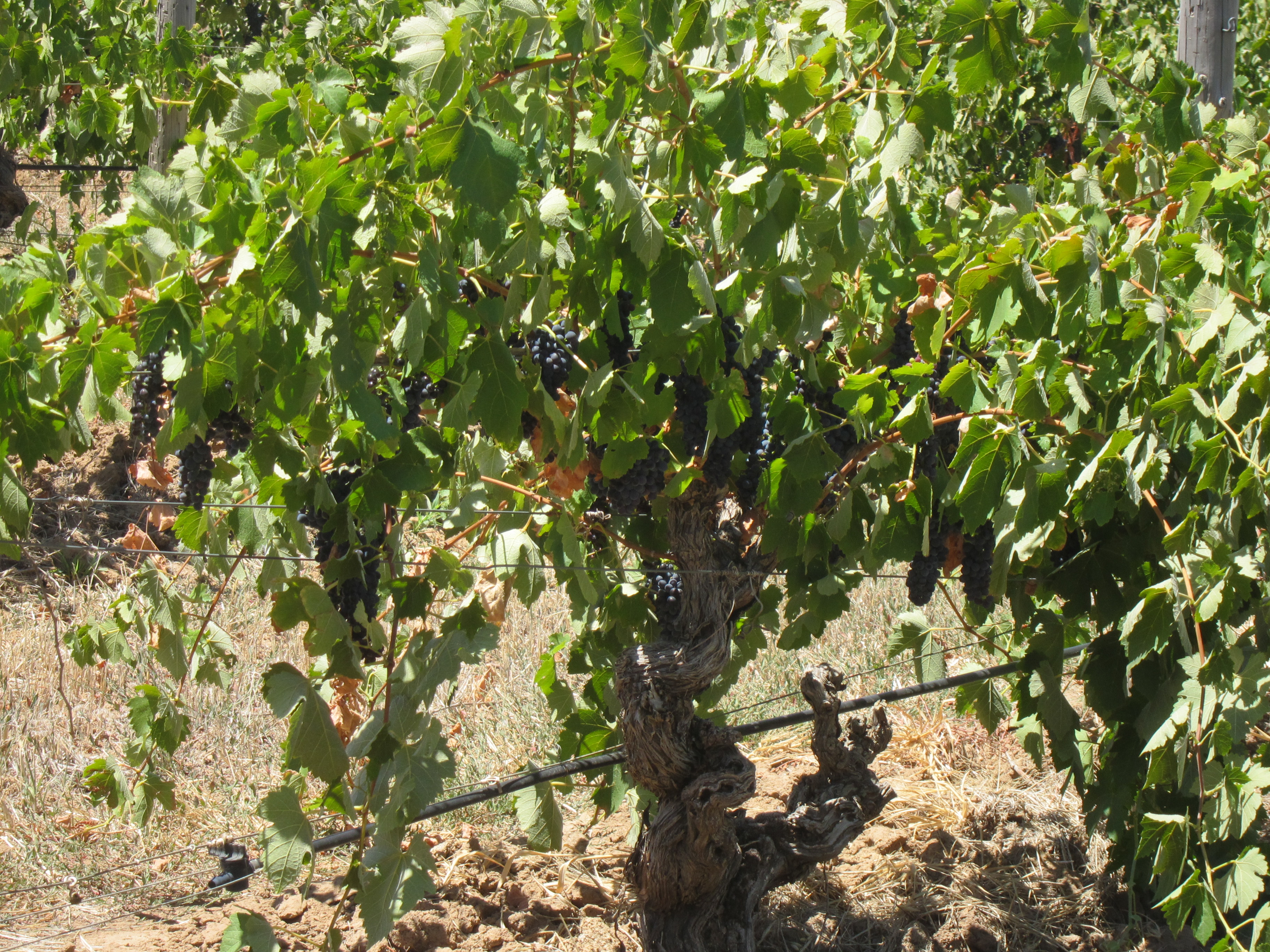
Les Amis Vineyard Grenache Vine, planted in 1901

Les Amis is 100% Grenache from dry-farmed bush vines planted in 1901 in western Seppeltsfield. The grapes are hand-harvested and destemmed into a single cement vat before being basket pressed directly into new French barriques for 18 months.

The Pict is 100% Mataró sourced from 85-year-old vines from the Materne ‘Quarry Block’ Vineyard in Northern Barossa. The grapes are destemmed into concrete fermenters and then basket pressed before ageing for 24 months in new French barriques. The name comes from the group of Late Iron Age and Early Mediaeval Celtic people living in ancient eastern and northern Scotland.

Woodcutter's Semillon is made from the Madeira (more robust and pink-skinned) clone of Semillon. It was one of the early white wine grape varieties planted by the first settlers around 160 years ago and Torbreck sources several old vine vineyards to provide grapes for this wine. The Semillon is hand picked and gently ‘whole bunch’ pressed to individual vats where they were left to settle. After 24 hours the younger blocks were racked to tank while the older, more robust parcels were transferred to six-year-old French barriques where they underwent a long cool fermentation. The components were blended just prior to bottling.

Steading Blanc (formerly known as "Rousanne Marsanne Viognier") is sourced entirely from the Descendant Vineyard planted in 1994 on Roennfeldt Road. The 55% Roussanne 25% Marsanne 20% Viognier blend is made from components harvested separately, with Marsanne and Viognier ageing on lees in seasoned (used) barriques for seven months and the Roussanne evolving in stainless steel. The varieties are married just prior to bottling.

Cuvée Juveniles Blanc is a lighter, fresher version of the Steading Blanc - a blend of Roussanne, Viognier, Marsanne, Clairette and Grenache Blanc.

== See also ==
- Australian wine
- Cult wine
- South Australian food and drink
- List of wineries in the Barossa Valley
