= Turkey Flat =

Winery in South Australia

Coordinates: 34°31′52″S 138°57′27″E

- Location: Barossa Valley, South Australia, Australia
- Founded: 1847
- Key people: Johann Friedrich August Fiedler
- Known for: Shiraz
- Varietals: Chardonnay, Shiraz, Grenache, Cabernet Sauvignon
- Website: http://www.turkeyflat.com.au

Turkey Flat is an Australian winery located in Tanunda, in the middle of South Australia's Barossa Valley wine-growing region. It is described by wine expert Oz Clarke as one of the "cult wines" of Australia. With more than 40% of its production dedicated to rosés, Turkey Flat has been considered a leader in the recent "rosé revival" trend of the early 21st century.

The history of Turkey Flat wines began in 1847 when Johann Frederick August Fiedler planted Shiraz vines near Bethany Creek. The vines planted in 1847 are some of the oldest vines used for commercial wine production today and believed to be the world's oldest vines that have been authenticated. However, another Barossa winery, Langmeil, and one in the Goulburn Valley wine region, Tahbilk, also claim to have vines just as old, or even older than Turkey Flat.

== History ==
Founded by Johann Frederick August Fiedler who planted Shiraz on the property, Turkey Flat was also a dairy farm as well as a butchery for several generations. It was named Turkey Flat because of the flocks of Australian Bustard that lived along the creek flats.

In 1865 the Schulz family became the owners of the Turkey Flat property. When fourth generation vineyard owners, Peter and Christie Schulz took over the property in 1987 they switched its focus completely over to grape growing and winemaking in the 1990s.

== Old vines ==
The 1847 Shiraz vines at Turkey Flat are believed to the oldest authenticated vines that are still producing fruit for a commercial use. At over 170 years of age, it is still far behind what is believed to be the world's oldest single grapevine, a Žametovka vine growing in Maribor in Slovenia that was planted over 400 years ago. Still, while the Slovenian vine only produces enough fruit to make around 25 liters of wine that is not available for public sale, the Shiraz block of Turkey Flat vines produces several cases of wines for commercial use. The 2002 vintage of the old vine Shiraz was even favorably reviewed by American wine critic Robert Parker who described the wine as having "glorious fruit with notes of crème de cassis, raspberry liqueur and licorice."

The property is also home to old vine Grenache plantings that are over 90 years old with the a block of Grenache vines that were first planted in 1920.

== Wines and grape varieties ==
Turkey Flat produces a number of wines including a GSM blend from their old vine Shiraz, Mataro and Grenache. They also produce varietal wines from those grapes, including rosés, as well as wine from Cabernet Sauvignon, Marsanne and Sémillon. A fortified "sticky" wine is produced from the Pedro Ximenez.

== See also ==
- Australian wine
- Cult wine
- South Australian food and drink
- List of wineries in the Barossa Valley
