= Hurlstone Agricultural High School =

Location
- Glenfield, Sydney, Macarthur region, New South Wales; Australia; 33°58′14″S 150°53′29″E

Information
- Type: Government-funded co-educational academically selective and specialist secondary day and boarding school
- Motto: Latin: Pro Patria (For my country)
- Established: 1 April 1907; 119 years ago
- Founder: John Kinloch
- Educational authority: NSW Department of Education
- Specialist: Agricultural school
- Principal: Christine Castle
- Teaching staff: c. 50
- Years: 7–12
- Enrolment: c. 1,080
- Campus: Suburban
- Campus size: 112 hectares (280 acres)
- Colours: Blue, red and gold
- Website: hurlstone-h.schools.nsw.gov.au

Hurlstone Agricultural High School (HAHS, colloquially as Hurlstone Ag) is a government-funded co-educational academically selective and specialist secondary day and boarding school, located in Glenfield, a south-western suburb of Sydney, in the Macarthur region of New South Wales, Australia. HAHS is the oldest government boarding school in New South Wales.

Farrer Memorial Agricultural High School, Yanco Agricultural High School and Hurlstone Agricultural High School are the state's only public selective and agricultural schools that also include a co-educational boarding school. The 112-hectare (277-acre) Hurlstone Agricultural campus includes classroom blocks, an operational farm, sporting facilities and student accommodation.

== History ==
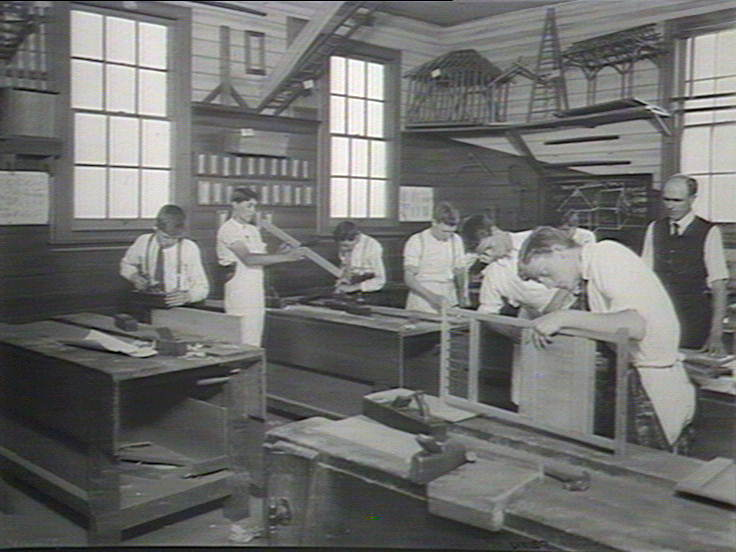
Manual training class, 1913

Hurlstone was established as a boys-only school in 1907 in Hurlstone Park, approximately ten kilometres southwest of Sydney, at the present site of Trinity Grammar School. The land used to be owned by a Pitt St. Minister, Reverend John Graharn, and when he wished to return home to England in 1874, he sold the land to John Kinloch, a teacher and one of the first graduates of the University of Sydney. He named the land Hurlstone Estate, after his mother's maiden name and set up his own school on it in 1878 which he called the Hurlstone School and College.

Four acres (approximately 1.6 hectares) of land were turned into a house, school, cricket and gymnastics ground, and sixteen acres (approximately 6.5 hectares) of land were for recreation and a pony run.

Some of the original subjects at Hurlstone included:

- English Grammar and Composition
- Reading Aloud
- Mathematics
- Physics
- Bookkeeping
- Gymnastics
- Surveying
- French

Resident boarders originally paid 150 pounds per year (not adjusted to inflation).

=== Hurlstone Agricultural Continuation School ===
In those days, most students completed their schooling after primary school and students at Hurlstone Agricultural Continuation School (as it was known at the time) studied there for only two years.

In 1926, the school moved to its present site in Glenfield, approximately 42 km southwest of Sydney (between Liverpool and Campbelltown) and adjacent to Glenfield railway station. By then its student numbers had grown from 30 in 1907, to 148. The school supported government policy to promote productivity in the agricultural sector through the training of boys in all aspects of agricultural sciences and farm management.

=== Macarthur Agricultural High School; co-educational enrolment ===
For a brief period in the early 1940s, it was known as Macarthur Agricultural High School in honour of wool-grower John Macarthur, but it soon reverted to its previous name.

Hurlstone was a boys' school until 1979, when the decision was made to become co-educational.

=== Sale of school farmland ===
In 2008, the New South Wales Government declared 140 hectares of Hurlstone's farmland "surplus" and proposed the sale of the land, leaving the school with just 20 hectares. The announcement was met with immediate public protest and the formation of a local community group Save Hurlstone Educational and Agricultural Property (SHEAP) eventuating in a government inquiry into the proposed sale and proceeds of the sale. There was further pressure against the plans when the National Trust heritage listed the school in late 2009. The government inquiry resulted in a recommendation of the sale of a small parcel of school land with the proceeds intended to help upgrade school facilities.

On 18 November 2015, there was another proposal to sell the land the school and its farm operated on.

== Principals ==
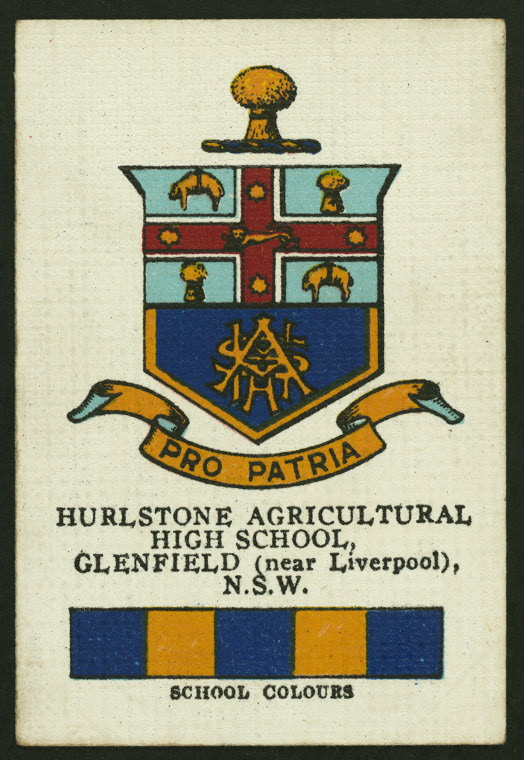
Collectable school cigarette card featuring the Hurlstone colours & crest, c. 1910s

Ordinal	Officeholder	Term start	Term end	Time in office	Notes
1	Frank McMullen	1907	1916	8–9 years	
2	George Longmuir	1917	1938	20–21 years	
3	Percival Hindmarsh	1939	1945	5–6 years	
4	James McEwan King	1946	1953	6–7 years	
5	Clarence G. James	1954	1967	12–13 years	
6	Reginald W. Clarke	1968	1978	9–10 years	
7	James F. White	1979	1982	2–3 years	
8	G. K. Wilson	1983	1987	3–4 years	
9	R. M. Kidd	1988	2003	14–15 years	
10	John Norris	2003	2010	6–7 years	
11	Kerrie Wratten	2011	2013	1–2 years	
12	Daryl Currie	2014	2018	3–4 years	
13	Christine Castle	2018	2025	7–8 years	

== Population ==
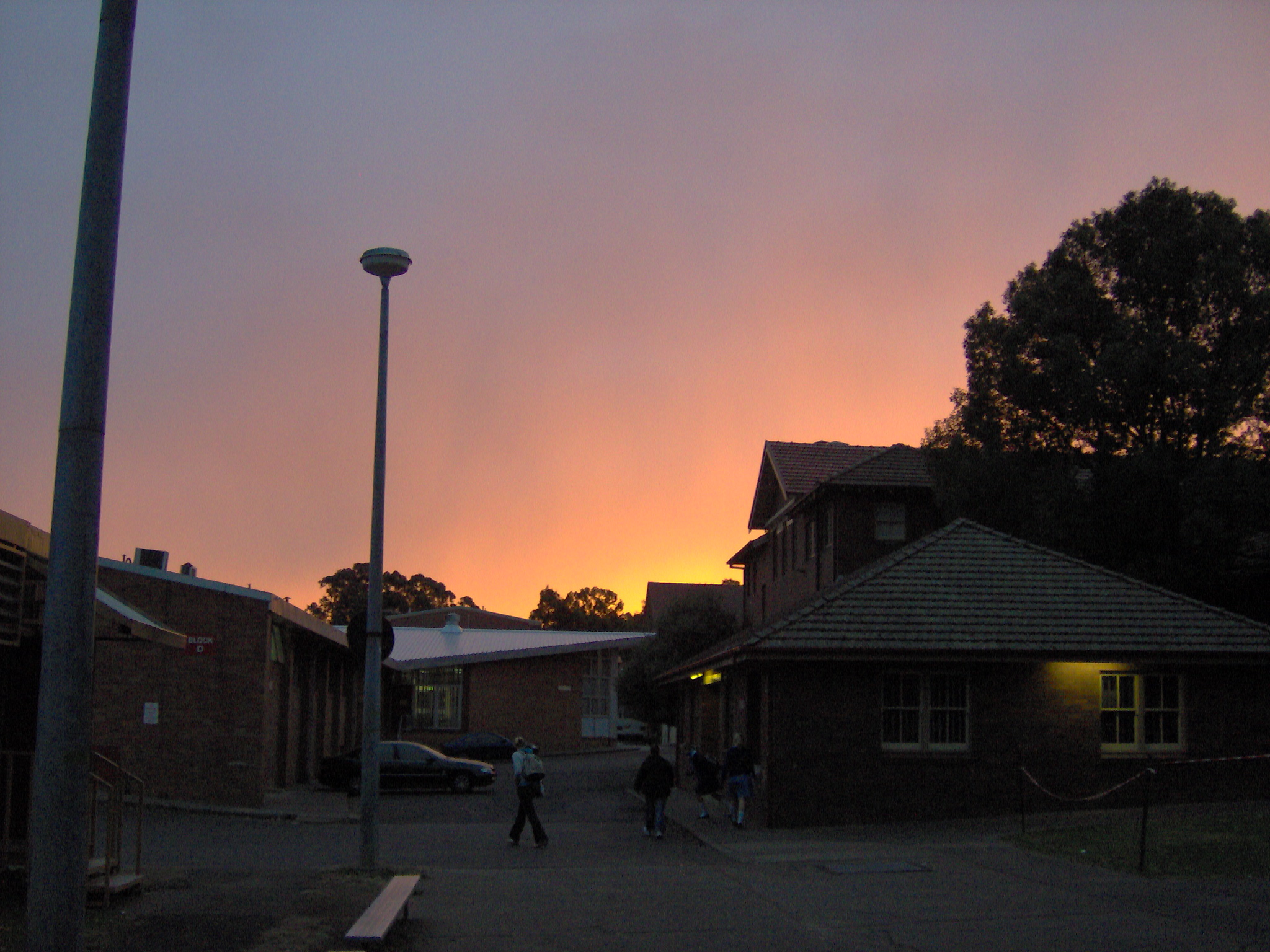
The boarding school at sunset. Several dormitories, a kitchen, and dining room are visible.

Enrolment at the school is dependent on selective examinations of Year 6 students from across the state. New students coming in later grades have to sit a similar exam.

As of 2026, 934 students are enrolled at HAHS.

== Campus ==
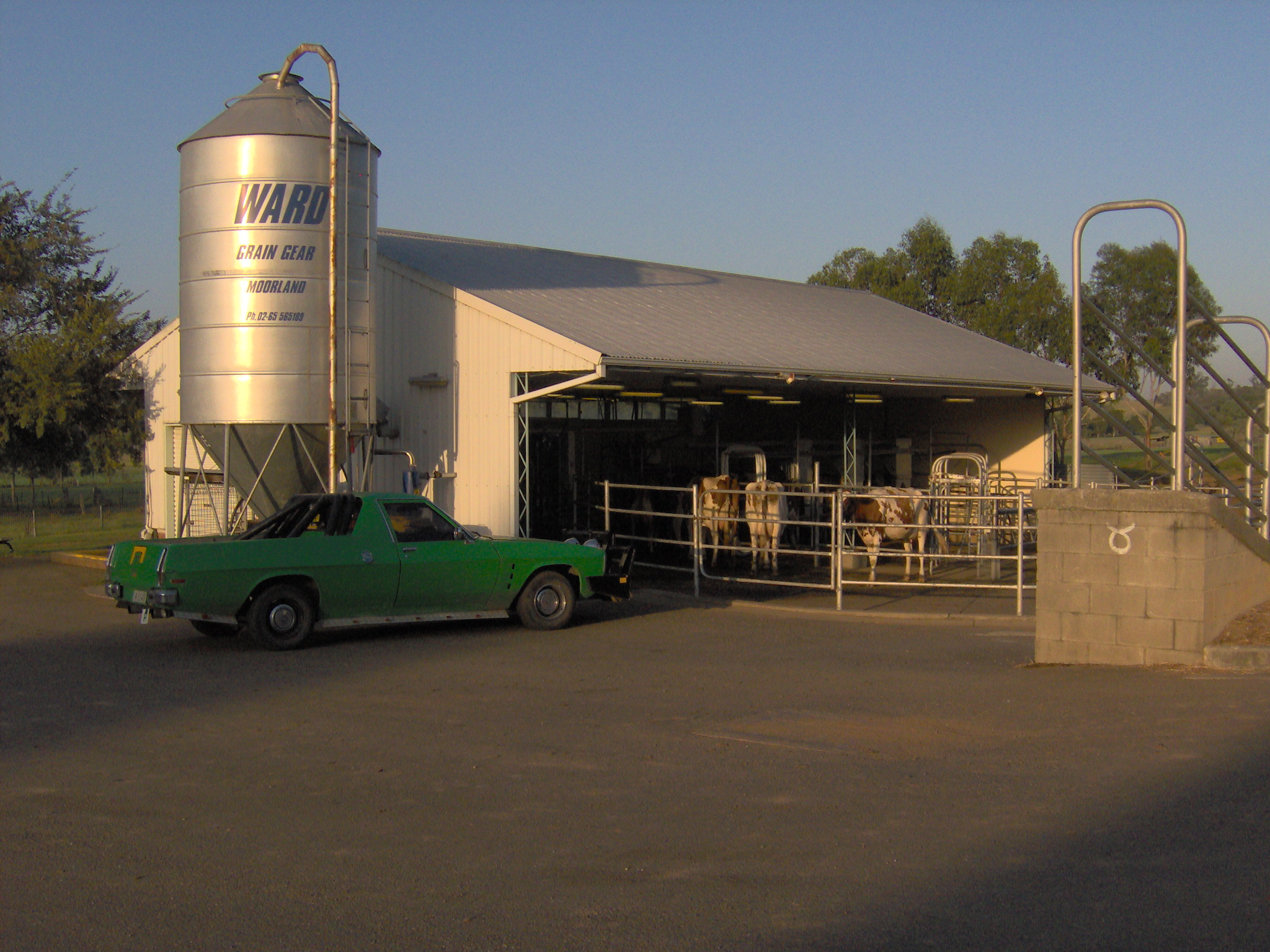
The school maintains a dairy with a milking herd of 38-45 cows and approximately 60 heifers, dry cows and calves.

Hurlstone features a fully functional farm and a commercial dairy. Animals on the farm include: beef and dairy cattle, sheep, horses, pigs, and chickens. Clarke House is a heritage listed building which houses Hurlstone's memorabilia museum.

The school also hosts a memorial forest and cairn on Roy Watts Road, past the boarding school. Established in 1950, it is believed to be Australia's first living war memorial, with a gum tree dedicated to each of the 600 students from the school who served in WWI and II. Currently, ANZAC and Remembrance Day ceremonies are held at the memorial forest.

As part of the 2008 mini-budget, the New South Wales Government declared 140 hectares of the school to be surplus to educational needs and the land will be sold in 2011. However, due to a strong public protest against this action, an inquiry was led into process of selling approximately seven-eighths of the school. As a result, Mal Peters, the Inquiry Chair, recommended the school's agricultural sector to be upgraded in order to reflect current industry practice and standards due to it being an economic, wise and important public investment for the people of NSW as it supplies young scientists with the knowledge for the ever declining, but demanding agricultural sector of the world.

In 2020 a new school called Hurlstone Agricultural High School was to open at Western Sydney University, Hawkesbury. The existing school in Glenfield would be renamed Roy Watts High School (after Hurlstone alumnus Roy Watts) and would remain fully selective but would no longer be an agricultural school. However, this decision was cancelled in December 2019. The farm land would have been converted to a new public school as well as housing and a shopping centre.

== Academics ==
=== NAPLAN Results ===
2023
Subject	Year 7	Year 9
Reading	670	670
Writing	627	682
Spelling	655	677
Grammar	684	689
Numeracy	714	744

2024
Subject	Year 7	Year 9
Reading	662 (-8)	679 (+9)
Writing	645 (+18)	672 (-10)
Spelling	655 (+0)	676 (-1)
Grammar	682 (-2)	703 (+14)
Numeracy	715 (+1)	734 (-10)

2025
Subject	Year 7	Year 9
Reading	662 (+0)	684 (+5)
Writing	647 (+2)	682 (+10)
Spelling	665 (+10)	682 (+6)
Grammar	696 (+14)	713 (+10)
Numeracy	720 (+5)	753 (+19)

=== HSC Results ===
Year	State Rank	Success Rate
2009	17th	38.87%
2010	21st	38%
2011	26th	33.33%
2012	20th	37.25%
2013	24th	33.8%
2014	24th	36.6%
2015	23rd	35.5%
2016	34th	30.22%
2017	44th	29.09%
2018	31st	30.1%
2019	26th	35.48%
2020	33rd	30.98%
2021	40th	29.65%
2022	43rd	27.63%
2023	39th	29.19%
2024	44th	28.56%
2025	43rd	29.39%

== Subjects ==
=== Year 7 ===
All subjects are mandatory.

- Agriculture
- English
- Geography
- History
- Mathematics
- Music
- PDHPE
- Science
- Technology Mandatory
- Visual Arts
- Wellbeing

=== Year 8 ===
All subjects are mandatory.

- Agriculture
- English
- Geography
- History
- Japanese
- Mathematics
- Music
- PDHPE
- Science
- Technology Mandatory
- Visual Arts

=== Year 9 ===
All subjects are mandatory unless stated otherwise.

- Agriculture
- Commerce (Elective)
- Computer Technology (Elective)
- English
- Food Technology (Elective)
- Geography
- History
- Elective History
- Industrial Technology (Elective)
- Japanese (Elective)
- Mathematics
- Elective Music
- PDHPE
- PASS (Elective)
- Photographic and Digital Media (Elective)
- Psychology (Elective)
- Science
- Textiles Technology (Elective)
- Visual Arts (Elective)

=== Year 10 ===
All subjects are mandatory unless stated otherwise.

- Agriculture
- Commerce (Elective)
- English
- Food Technology (Elective)
- Geography
- History
- Hospitality (Elective)
- Industrial Technology (Elective)
- Computer Technology (Elective)
- Japanese (Elective)
- Mathematics
- Music (Elective)
- PDHPE
- PASS (Elective)
- Photographic and Digital Media (Elective)
- Science
- Textiles Technology (Elective)
- Visual Arts (Elective)

=== Year 11 (Preliminary) ===
Everything is an elective except English.

- Agriculture
- Ancient History
- Biology
- Business Studies
- Ceramics
- Chemistry
- Economics
- Engineering Studies
- English
- Enterprise Computing
- Geography
- Health and Movement Science
- Hospitality
- Japanese
- Korean
- Legal Studies
- Mathematics
- Modern History
- Music
- Photography, Video and Digital Imaging
- Physics
- SLR
- Society & Culture
- Studies of Religion
- Visual Arts

=== Year 12 (HSC) ===
Everything is an elective except English.

- Agriculture
- Ancient History
- Biology
- Business Studies
- Chemistry
- Economics
- Engineering Studies
- English
- Enterprise Computing
- Extension History
- Geography
- Health and Movement Science
- Legal Studies
- Investigating Science and Extension Science
- Japanese
- Korean
- Mathematics
- Modern History
- Music
- Physics
- Studies of Religion
- Visual Arts

== Demographics ==
At Hurlstone, as of 2026, only 1% of students have a Aboriginal or Torres Strait Islander background. At Hurlstone, as of 2026, 9 out of 10 students have a language background other than English. At Hurlstone, as of 2026, 59% of students are boys and 41% are girls. At Hurlstone, as of 2026, more than half the students are at the top quarter of socio-economic advantage in Australia.

== Houses ==
Hurlstone has four houses: Farrer (red), Lachlan [Macquarie] (green), Macarthur (Yellow) and Wentworth (Blue).

== Co-curricular Activities ==
Some examples of co-curricular activities at Hurlstone are:

- Cadets
- Environment Committee
- Interact
- Rural Youth
- Orchestra
- Instrument Tutorials
- Events Management Team

== Notable alumni ==
- Phil Burton – Australian musician, member of the Australian pop vocal band Human Nature
- Alan O. Trounson (1958–1962) – biologist, stem cell researcher and IVF pioneer

=== Military ===
- Mark Binskin – Chief of the Defence Force (CDF) Australia.
- John Hurst Edmondson VC – soldier in World War II; the Hurlstone school hall is named in his honour
- Sir William Keys AC, MC – National Secretary of RSL

=== Politics, public service and the law ===
- John Kerin – Australian Labor Party politician, former Federal Treasurer (1991), Minister for Transport and Communications (1991), Minister for Primary Industries and Energy (1983–1991) and Member for Werriwa
- Mark Latham – politician, former Leader of the Australian Labor Party
- Dick Klugman – Member for the federal seat of Prospect 1969–1990, Co-founder of NSW Council for Civil Liberties

=== Sport ===
- David Lyons – rugby union player, Wallabies
- Charles Melton – winemaker

== See also ==
- List of government schools in New South Wales
- List of selective high schools in New South Wales
- List of boarding schools in Australia
