= Wolf Blass =

Winery in South Australia

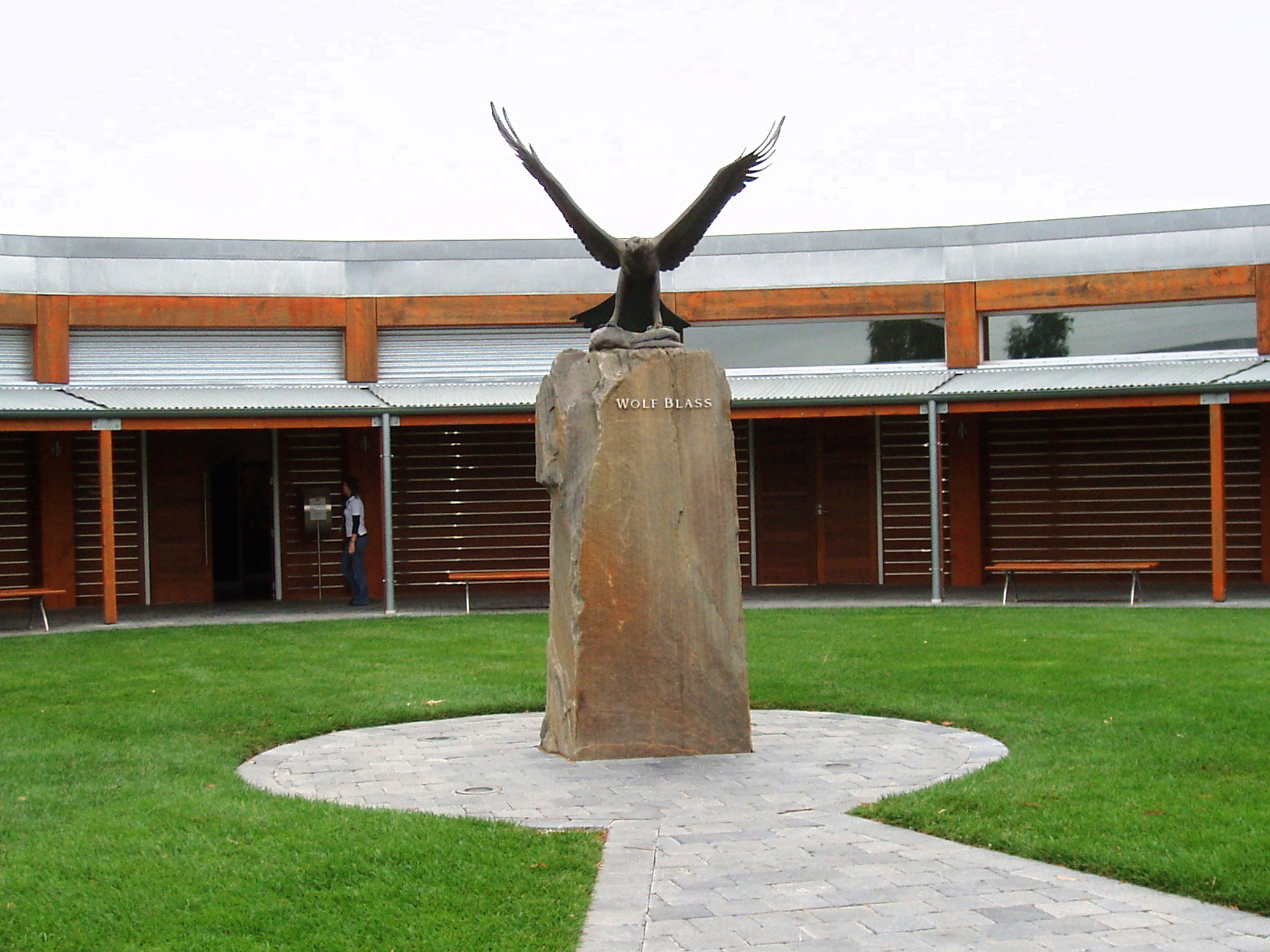
- Wolf Blass Visitor Centre
- Location: 97 Sturt Highway, Nuriootpa, South Australia, Australia
- Coordinates: 34°26′24″S 139°01′59″E
- Wine region: Barossa Valley
- Founded: 1966
- First vintage: 1966
- Key people: Founder: Wolfgang Blass, A.M. Chief Winemaker: Chris Hatcher
- Parent company: Treasury Wine Estates
- Known for: Wolf Blass Black Label Cabernet Shiraz, Wolf Blass Medlands Vineyard Platinum Label Shiraz
- Varietals: Riesling, Chardonnay, Shiraz, Cabernet Sauvignon
- Tasting: Open 10am to 4:30pm daily. Closed Christmas Day.
- Website: Wolfblass.com

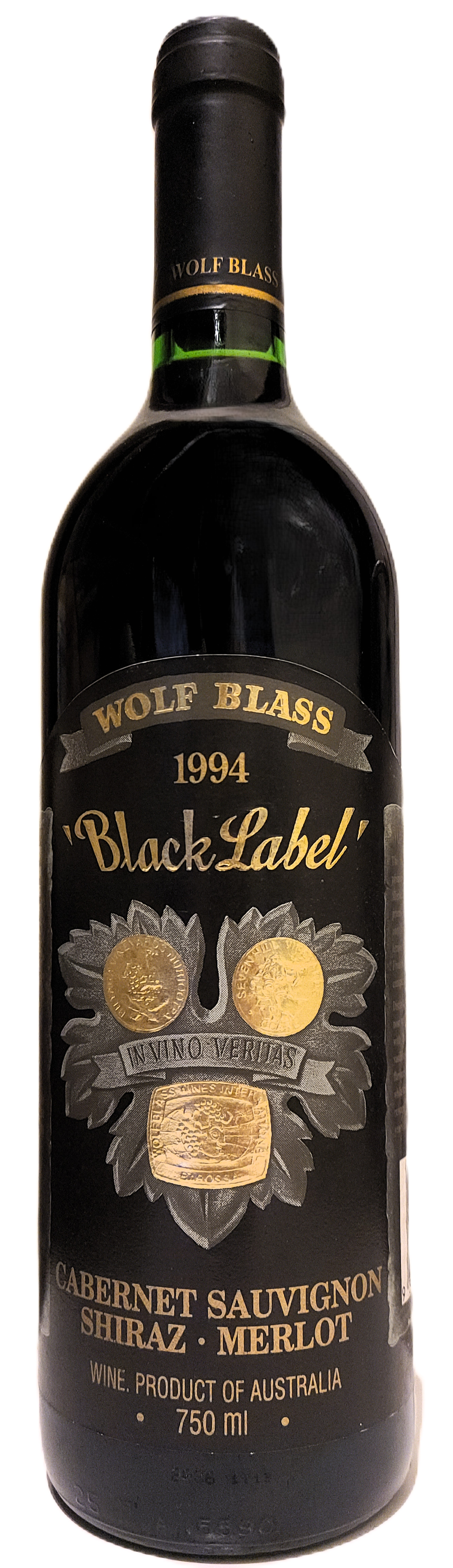
Black Label 1994

Wolf Blass is an Australian winery based in Nuriootpa, South Australia within the Barossa Valley wine region.

== Overview ==
It was established in 1966 by Wolfgang Blass (born 2 September 1934), a German immigrant who arrived in Australia in 1961 with little money but with a diploma in winemaking. One of his first jobs was with Tolley, Scott and Tolley as a winemaker. Wolf Blass Wines Ltd was purchased by Mildara in 1991, to form Mildara Blass, and was itself bought by Fosters Brewing six years later, which then acquired the Rothbury Group in 1998.

Contentions by Blass include that "parasitic and idiotic funding systems for overseas promotion mean that overproduced wine from Australian irrigated fruit will hit rock bottom, facing competition from South Africa", and "Barossa should focus on what it does best: full-bodied Shiraz". He has also stated that "No table wine over 15% [alcohol by volume] should ever get any medal, anywhere in the world, ever."

== Sponsorship and scholarships ==
Wolf Blass Sponsor AFL Women's.

== See also ==
- Australian wine
- Cult wine
- South Australian food and drink
- List of wineries in the Barossa Valley
