= Australian Vintage =

Australian wine company

Australian Vintage Limited
- Formerly: Roserim Limited
- Type: Public
- Traded as: ASX: AVG
- Industry: Winemaking
- Founded: 30 May 1991
- Founder: Brian McGuigan
- Headquarters: Cowandilla, South Australia
- Key people: Tom Dusseldorp(CEO)
- Products: McGuigan Wines; Nepenthe; Tempus Two; The Barossa Valley Wine Company
- Number of employees: 430
- Website: www.australianvintage.com.au

Australian Vintage Limited (AVG) is an Australian public company that operates within the wine production industry. It was established by Brian McGuigan with the help of his wife, Fay, and younger brother, Neil McGuigan. The company was incorporated on 30 May 1991 in New South Wales under the name Roserim Limited. This name later changed to Brian McGuigan Wines Limited. After the merger with Simeon Wines in 2002, the company changed its name to McGuigan Simeon Wines Limited, before renaming it to Australian Vintage Limited in 2008. Its main business activities include retail and wholesale wine production, and vineyard management services. As at 2022 it was ranked the fifth largest Australian wine company by production and also the fifth largest in terms of total revenue. It produced several well known products such as Passion Pop.

== History ==
=== Early history ===
The passion for winemaking is cultivated early in the McGuigan family. In 1880, Owen McGuigan—Brian and Neil's grandfather—started tending his vineyard located in Rothbury in the Hunter Valley of New South Wales to make additional income aside from his dairy production business. His son, Percival (Perc) McGuigan, was influenced to pursue a career in the wine industry from helping his father in the vineyard. Starting in 1941, he became a vineyard manager for the Dalwood Estate for almost 30 years, which he later bought and renamed into Wyndham Estate. He was inducted as a Hunter Valley Legend in 2007 for being a key figure in the development of the Hunter Valley wine industry and community, in particular the shift of consumer preference from richer wines, to lighter dry table wines in the 1950s. This can be attributed to the increased opportunity of a full-range wine-tasting and the increase of European migrants knowledgeable of light wines.

Following Perc's purchase of the Wyndham Estate, his son—Brian— founded the Wyndham Estate Wine Company in the 1970s and became the company's Managing Director. In 1991, the company was sold, giving Brian the resources to build his own. His company was officially listed in the Australian Securities Exchange (ASX) on 26 March 1992 and incorporated as Roserim Limited, before changing its name to Brian McGuigan Wines Limited. Following his father's footsteps, Brian was inducted as a Hunter Valley Legend in 2008 for his contributions.

=== 1992–2007 ===
Following its incorporation, Brian McGuigan Wines Ltd engaged in many acquisitions in its early business years. The company acquired the Bethany Creek and Vine Vale vineyards in 1992. In 1994, the company absorbed four wineries: Richmond Grove winery, Deaseys Road vineyard, Hunter Ridge winery and Pokolbin winery. In 1996, the company acquired an unlabeled vineyard in the Upper Hunter region. Between 1997 and 1998, it sold the Hunter Ridge label to BRL Hardy, acquired Hermitage Road winery and sold five of its vineyards to the Beston Pacific Vineyard Trust. In 1999, the company acquired an additional 25% of its UK distribution company, Geoffrey Roberts Agencies, as well as the Yaldara winery in the Barossa Valley region.

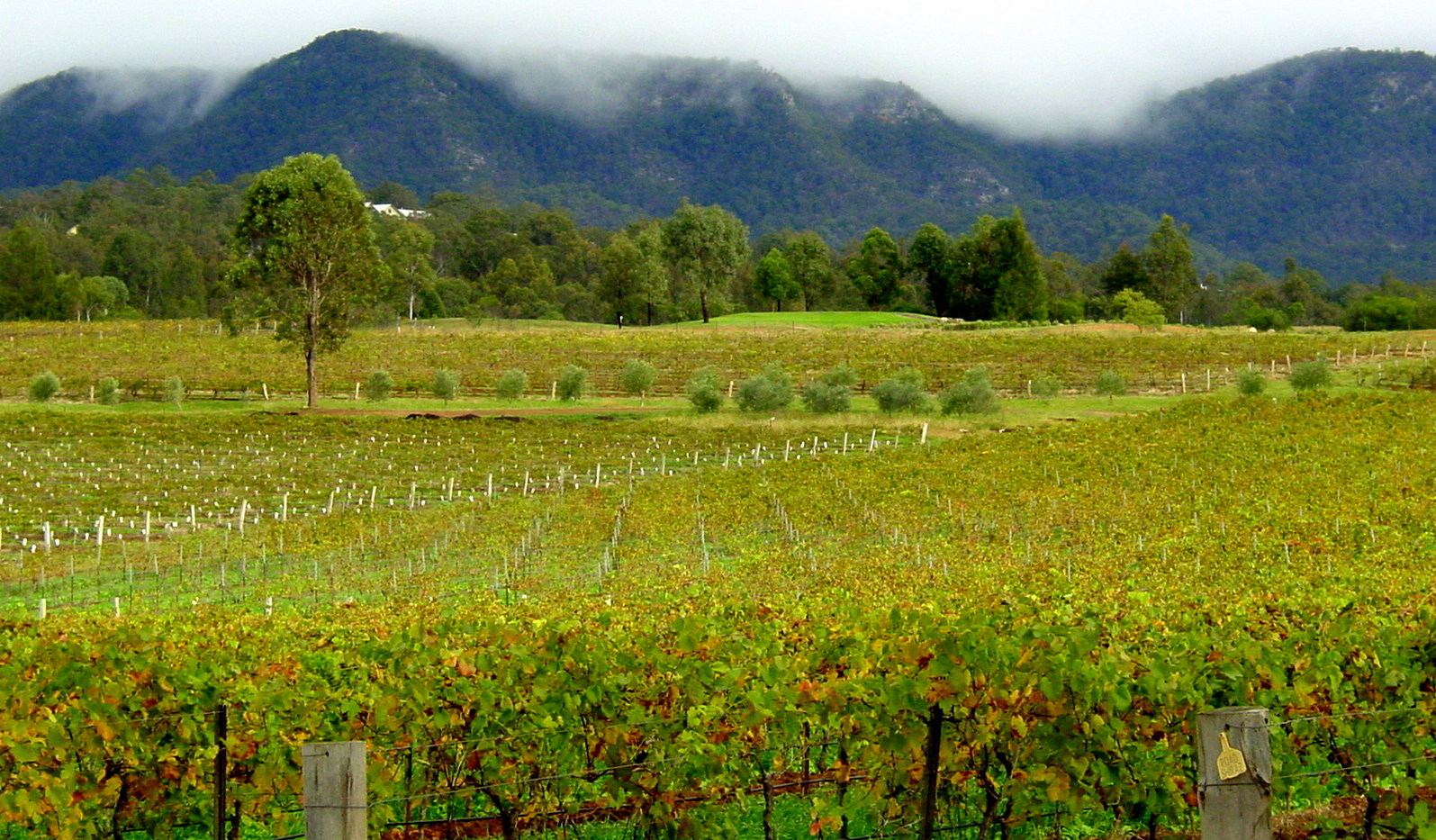
A vineyard located in the Hunter Valley of New South Wales

Brian McGuigan Wines Limited merged with Simeon Wines in 2002 and renamed the company to McGuigan Simeon Wines Limited on 10 July 2002. In 2003, it sold Richmond Grove Pathaway, Lawsons Pathaway and Qualco East Vineyards and acquired Miranda Wines. In 2005, it acquired Whitton vineyard, and divested of its Griffith-based winery and bottling operations to Dal Broi Family Wines. It partnered with WaverlyTBS, a UK-based wine distributor, in 2006 to achieve one of its key company strategies, i.e. to grow its exports. Similarly, in 2007, the company partnered with a Dutch wine distributor, Group LFE. That same year it acquired Nepenthe Wines.

=== 2008–present ===
In 2008, by Board consensus, the company's name was changed to Australian Vintage Limited and was publicly listed on the Australian Securities Exchange. In 2011, it sold its Loxton Winery for $27m to TWG Australia, a subsidiary of The Wine Group LLC, USA. In 2014, the company sold its Yaldara Winery to 1847 Winery (SA) Pty Ltd for $15.5m to reduce its debt.

== Brands ==
Australian Vintage Limited owns and manufactures the five brands listed below.

Brand Name	Vineyard Locations	Chief Winemaker	Brand Logo
McGuigan Wines	Hunter Valley	Neil McGuigan	McGuigan Wines logo
Nepenthe	Adelaide Hills: Balhannah, Charleston, Hahndorf	James Evers	Nepenthe Logo
Tempus Two	Hunter Valley, Coonawarra, Griffith, Barossa Valley, McLaren Vale, Adelaide Hills, Gundagai, Tumbarumba	Andrew Duff	Tempus Two logo
Barossa Valley Wine Company	Southern region of the Barossa Valley	Jamie Saint	BVWC Logo

== Operations ==
The company generates 97% of its revenue from wine processing and packaging, 2% from the management of vineyards, and the remaining 1% from unallocated sources. Its operations span primarily across four continents: Europe— with an emphasis on the United Kingdom and Ireland, Australia, Asia and North America. The UK/Europe region is the leading export markets, generating 44.9% of the company's total revenue, with Australia coming next at 39%, then Asia and North America at 7.4% and 6% respectively. The geographic source of the remainder is undetermined.

=== Sustainability ===
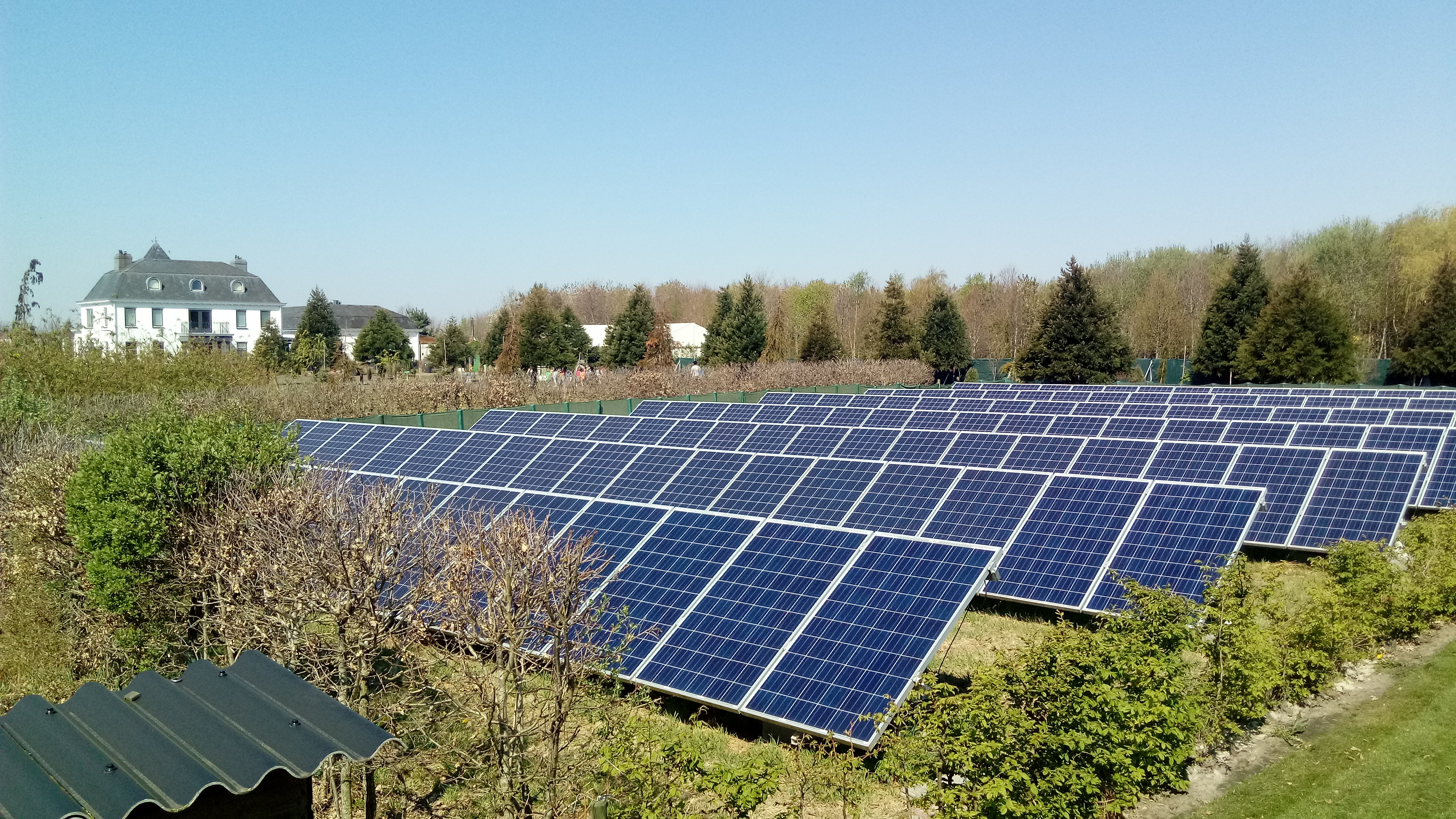
A solar panel system

Australian Vintage is one of the pioneering companies undertaking major sustainability efforts in the Australian wine industry. In November 2018, the company signed the Hybrid Renewable Corporate Power Purchase Agreement (PPA). The agreement requires 90% of the energy consumption of the company's Buronga Hill plant located in New South Wales to be sourced from renewable energy sources. The plant is the third largest winery in Australia and the company determines that 60% of the energy is to be sourced from off-site wind and solar plants provided by Flow Power, a wholesale electricity supplier, while the remaining 30% is to be obtained from its privately owned on-site solar panel systems.

=== Expansion into China ===
Australian Vintage Limited has made major investments as their "commitment to the Chinese market [grows] stronger than ever". In August 2014, it entered a long-term partnership with COFCO Wine & Spirits Co Ltd., which is a subsidiary of China Oil and Food Corporation (COFCO), a Chinese food manufacturing giant. This agreement grants COFCO exclusive distribution rights which is solely applicable to the McGuigan Wines brand.

For the remaining brands, i.e. Tempus Two, Nepenthe and the Barossa Valley Wine Company, the distribution rights are given to partner Vintage China Fund, led by Jiang Yuan, the founder of YesMyWine, China's largest online wine retailer. The partnership was signed in 2017 and involved Vintage China Fund raising $16.5m capital by purchasing 35.9 million of AVL's shares. In addition, Yuan gained a controlling interest and became a member of the Board. The investment decision was made due to several reasons. Firstly, due to the partners’ notable experience in e-commerce— in particular, online wine trading. Secondly, due to a substantial rise in Australian wine sales in 2016, driven mostly by the success of rival Australian wine company, Treasury Wine Estates, owner of the brands Penfolds, Wolf Blass and more.

== See also ==
- Australian wine
