= Château Tanunda Winery =

Château Tanunda is an Australian winery established in 1890 in the Barossa Valley of South Australia.

Chateau Tanunda logo

The Château Tanunda is one of the most significant winery buildings in the Barossa Valley built with bluestone quarried from nearby Bethany in the late 1890s, Glasgow cast iron, and French oak, and is a designated monument on the South Australian Heritage Register.

Chateau Tanunda has a 5 star rating from James Halliday, and came 5th in the Halliday Wine Companion People's Choice Award 2024.

== History ==
The Château Tanunda was established in 1890 after an opportunity for large wine export to Europe was identified with the drop in supply from a France hit by phylloxera. The Barossa wine industry, however, was disorganised and made up of over 560 peasant sized growers in the 1880s. While vineyards were expanding, what was lacking was the winery space.

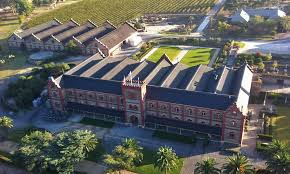
Chateau Tanunda from the air

GF Cleland and William Jacob of Moorooroo formed the GF Cleland and Co ltd in 1888 luring wine pioneers Sir Samuel and Lady Davenport, Dr and Mrs ED Cleland and CJ Horrocks to invest. Working together with Barossa growers kingpin John Basedow and many smaller investors, they raised £38,700 to build the Château Tanunda winery building. With high unemployment in Australia at the time due to many strikes and a drop in foreign investment, the Barossa had a large supply of skilled stonemasons ideal for the construction of the large stone building.

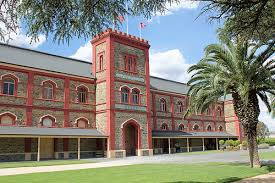
Chateau Tanunda Barossa Valley south facade

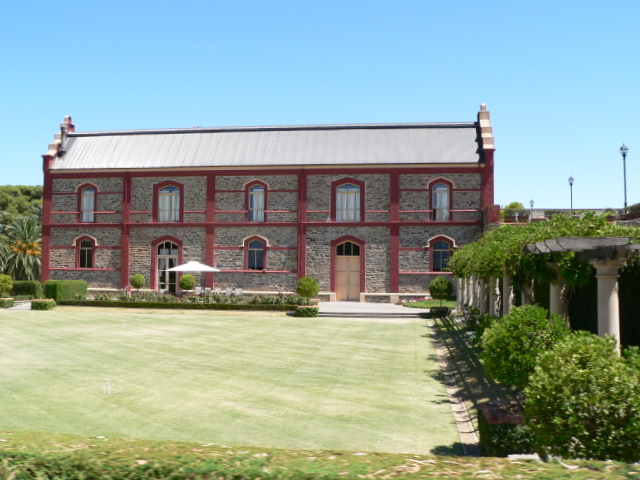
Chateau Tanunda eastern wing and croquet field

The schisty bluestone for the edifice of the building was dug from a quarry in the nearby Bethany, and brick kilns erected at the front of a site chosen on highest point of the Barossa Valley floor, facing south over the first Barossa vineyards. John Basedow and his men completed the edifice in 11 months, which was the biggest building in the Southern Hemisphere when completed in 1890. Once established, the winery could handle 100 tons of grapes per day.

By 1902 exports totalled 80,000 gallons of Château Tanunda brandy, and 700,000 gallons of wine at £1 per gallon.

From 1916 to 1998, the Chateau was owned by the Seppelt family. The business and structure was restored by the Geber family who purchased it in 1998, including building a small batch basket press winery. Its wines come from over 100 hectares of estate owned vineyards in the sub-regions of Bethany, Eden Valley, Vine Vale and Tanunda, as well as grapes from 30 growers across the Barossa Valley.

== Wines produced ==
Château Tanunda produces high quality table wines from the grape varieties Shiraz, Cabernet Sauvignon, Grenache, Chardonnay, and Riesling, and was also known for its brandy in the past. The Chateau introduced a Tawny for the first time in its history in late 2022 to extremely positive reception.

The winery came of age after winning three major trophies with its Everest wines at the International Wine and Spirit Competition in 2010 including Best Shiraz, Best Single Estate Red for Grenache, along with Best Australian Wine Producer.

== See also ==
- Australian wine
- Cult wine
- South Australian food and drink
- List of wineries in the Barossa Valley
