= Peter Lehmann (winemaker) =

Australian wine producer (1930 – 2013)

Peter Lehmann Wines
- Location: Barossa Valley, South Australia, Australia
- Founded: 1979
- Key people: Peter Lehmann
- Known for: Stonewell Shiraz
- Varietals: Shiraz, Riesling, Chardonnay, Cabernet Sauvignon, Merlot
- Website: peterlehmannwines.com

Peter Leon Lehmann AM, (18 August 1930 – 28 June 2013) was an Australian wine producer based in the Barossa Valley.

== Biography ==
Lehmann was born in Angaston, South Australia in Barossa Valley on 18 August 1930.

His father was Lutheran Pastor Franz Julius Lehmann, and son may have joined father in the ministry but for Franz' sudden death in 1945, aged 55. Peter soon dropped out of school "ostensibly to be some support to my recently widowed mother," he says.

In 1947, he started work at the Yalumba winery under Rudi Kronberger. From 1960 to 1980 he was Winemaker/Manager at Saltram Wines. He parted company with Saltram to become the Chairman of Peter Lehmann Wines, a role later filled by his son Doug.

Peter Lehmann has been described as one of Australia's most respected and innovative wine makers. His success in winning international trophies has been noted by the Australian Wine and Brandy Corporation.

=== Family ===
Lehmann's eldest son Doug Lehmann was also a noted winemaker who worked for the family company. He died in June 2014.

== Peter Lehmann Wines ==
Founded in 1979, Peter Lehmann Wines produces around 600,000 cases annually, with distribution to Australia, the United Kingdom, the United States and many other countries. It is located in the Barossa Valley, approximately 70 kilometres north of Adelaide in South Australia.

In 1977, Saltram instructed then winemaker/manager Peter Lehmann to buy less grapes from their Barossa growers. Since Peter had given the growers his word to buy the grapes, he refused. After months of negotiations with Dalgety plc, which owned Saltram, he was allowed to start an outside company called Masterson Barossa Vineyards in order to buy and process the grapes. Tyre retailer MS Mcleod gave financial backing to the venture. The inspiration of the name came from the legendary gambler Sky Masterson (see Guys and Dolls), because starting the company was such a gamble, and in keeping with the theme the queen of clubs was chosen as the logo for the company.

In 1979 Saltram was sold to Canadian multinational spirit producer Seagram which informed Peter that he could no longer make wine on the side, so he quit his job at Saltram and worked fully for Masterson. In 1982 the company was renamed Peter Lehmann Wines.

In 1992 MS Mcleod decided to divest themselves of their investment in the company, and with no local buyer in the offing and the company again facing closure or a fire sale to a multinational, a public float was devised. While the core shareholding was intended to be taken up by the growers themselves and by staff, it was feared that the capital raised would be insufficient and so a share and option package was offered publicly. In the end the float was oversubscribed and the new company performed strongly.

In late 2003 'PLW' became the subject of a heated bidding war between UK-based Allied Domecq and Swiss based Hess Group. Allied Domecq had acquired 14.5% of Peter Lehmann Wines when it first submitted a takeover bid on 22 September. Peter Lehmann and the board of directors countered by recommending sale to the Hess Group instead. Hess matched the Allied Domecq offer, adding a special dividend to the deal, and purchased the company for a market valuation of $103 million USD.

By 2016, Peter Lehmann Wines was owned by Casella Family Brands.

== See also ==
- Australian wine
- Cult wine
- South Australian food and drink
- List of wineries in the Barossa Valley
