= Barossa Valley wine region =

Wine region in South Australia

Coordinates: 34.516741°S 138.87989°E

Barossa Valley
- Wine region
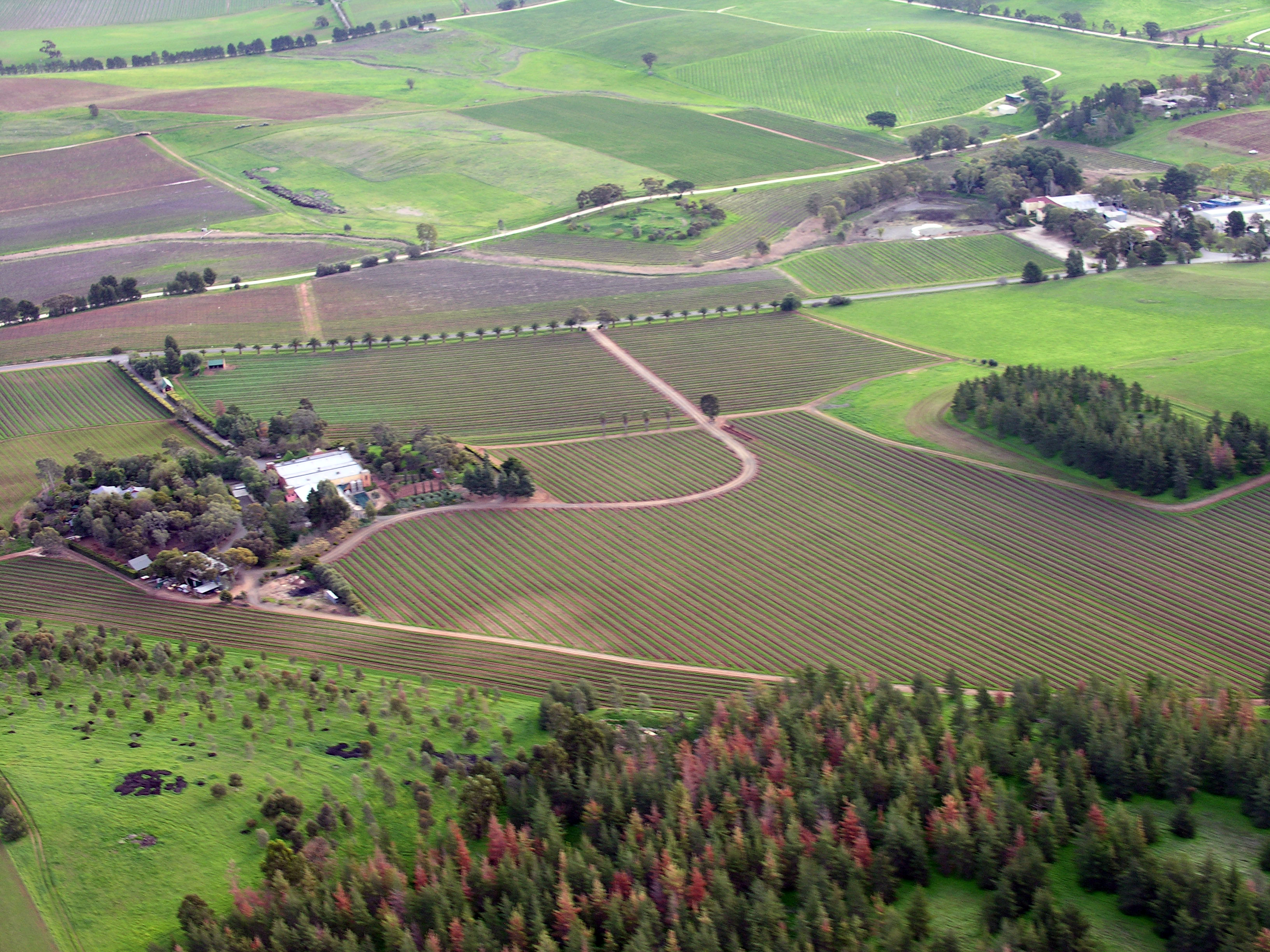
- Aerial view of the Barossa Valley
- Type: Geographical indication (GI)
- Year established: 1997
- Years of wine industry: Since 1843; 183 years ago
- Country: Australia
- Part of: Barossa Zone
- Growing season: October–April
- Climate region: Mediterranean
- Heat units: 1710
- Soil conditions: Clay loam through to sandy
- Size of planted vineyards: 10,350 hectares (25,600 acres)
- Varietals produced: Shiraz; Grenache; Mourvedre; Cabernet Sauvignon; Riesling; Chardonnay; Semillon; Saperavi
- No. of wineries: 150+
- Comments: Data from 2012

The Barossa Valley wine region is one of Australia's oldest and most prestigious wine regions. Located in South Australia, the Barossa Valley is about 56 km (35 miles) northeast of the city of Adelaide. Unlike most of Australia whose wine industry was heavily influenced by the British, the wine industry of the Barossa Valley was founded by German settlers fleeing persecution from the Prussian province of Silesia (in what is now Poland). The warm continental climate of the region promoted the production of very ripe grapes that was the linchpin of the early Australian fortified wine industry. As the modern Australian wine industry shifted towards red table wines (particularly those made by the prestigious Cabernet Sauvignon) in the mid-20th century, the Barossa Valley fell out of favor due to its reputation for being largely a Syrah from producers whose grapes were destined for blending. During this period the name "Barossa Valley" rarely appeared on wine labels. In the 1980s, the emergence of several boutique families specializing in old vine Shiraz wines began to capture international attention for the distinctive style of Barossa Shiraz, a full bodied red wine with rich chocolate and spice notes. This led to a renaissance in the Barossa Valley which catapulted the region to the forefront of the Australian wine industry.

Many of Australia's largest and most notable wineries are either headquartered or own extensive holdings in the Barossa Valley. These include such wineries as Penfolds, Peter Lehmann, Orlando Wines, Seppeltsfield, Wolf Blass and Yalumba. Many Shiraz vines in the Barossa Valley are several decades old, with some vineyards planted with old vines that are 100–150 years old including Turkey Flat in Tanunda that is home to the oldest commercially producing grape vines, originally planted in 1847. Other grape varieties grown in the Barossa Valley include Grenache, Mourvedre, Cabernet Sauvignon, Riesling, Chardonnay and Semillon.

In February 2011, South Australian Premier Mike Rann announced that special legislation would be introduced to protect the unique heritage of the Barossa Valley and McLaren Vale. Premier Rann said: "Barossa and McLaren Vale food and wine are key icons of South Australia. We must never allow the Barossa or McLaren Vale to become suburbs of Adelaide." The Character Preservation (Barossa Valley) Act 2012 was subsequently passed by the South Australian Parliament.

== History ==
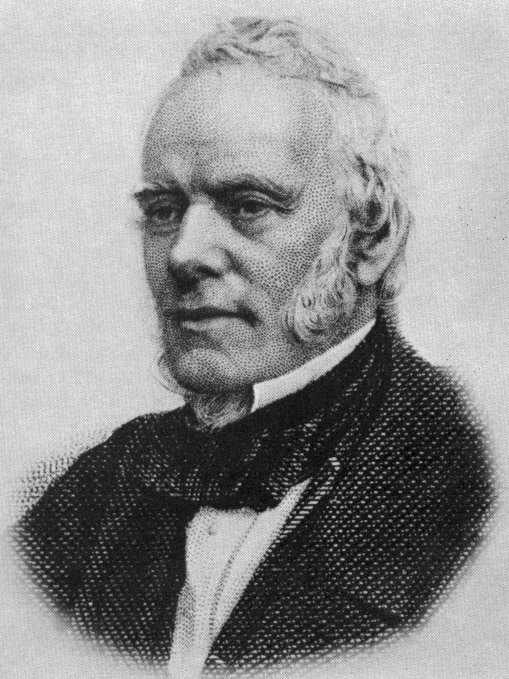
George Angas and the South Australian Company promised Sileasian refugees safe passage and land in the Barossa Valley, ushering in the Germanic influence that would shape the Barossa wine industry.

In December 1837 an expedition led Colonel William Light and was surveyed in 1839 by his assistant surveyor, William Jacob (1814–1902), as part of a wider survey of the Barossa region. Light chose the name in memory of the British victory over the French in the Battle of Barrosa, in which he fought in 1811. The name "Barossa" was registered in error, due to a clerical error in transcribing the name "Barrosa".

While most of Australia's wine industry was directly influenced by the involvement of the British, the Barossa Valley was shaped by the influence of German settlers fleeing persecution from the Prussian province of Silesia. In 1841, the South Australian Company (under orders of one of its shareholders George Fife Angas) chartered three ships to Silesia to offer refuge and land in the Barossa Valley to any settler willing to volunteer to help establish the colony. Nearly 500 families accepted the offer and settled in the Barossa Valley. After trying many types of agricultural crops, the settlers found the warm fertile valley to be ideally suited for viticulture. The early years of the Barossa Valley winemaking ushered in a long period of trial and error for while the settlers were skilled farmers, their previous homeland of Silesia had little to no winemaking tradition.

The early focus of the Barossa Valley wine industry was on the production of Riesling, a German wine grape from the Rhineland. The hot valley floor contributed to a very ripe, alcoholic wine that would often turn brown. Some of this wine was eventually distilled in brandy which ushered in a period of fortified wine production that coincided with the plantings of many red grape wine varieties like Shiraz and Grenache. These "port-style wines" would become the center of the Barossa Valley wine industry for decades to come. When the focus on the Australian wine industry shifted in the mid-20th century to production of premium, non-fortified wines, the Barossa Valley was regarded as an "inferior" wine region compared to cooler climate regions such as Coonawarra and Padthaway. This was partly due to the extensive association that the Barossa Valley had with Shiraz, including vast old vines plantings that were several decades old. During this period Shiraz was considered a very "common" variety that was not as fashionable as the prestigious Cabernet Sauvignon that was popular in the world's wine market. Most of the grapes produced in the Barossa Valley during this time was used as part of anonymous blends with the name "Barossa Valley" rarely appearing on wine labels.

By the late 20th century, the reputation of the Barossa Valley started to change as several small boutique varieties began earning critical acclaim for their Barossa Valley wines. In particular, Barossa Shiraz became so well known internationally that it was considered its own unique style of Syrah that was distinctive of the grape's expression in other regions like Côte-Rôtie, Châteauneuf-du-Pape and California. This style of big, full bodied Shiraz with rich, chocolate and spice notes became synonymous with not only the Barossa Valley but with Australian wine in general. In the words of Master of Wine Jancis Robinson, the Barossa Valley became "Australia's quintessential wine region".

== Climate and geography ==
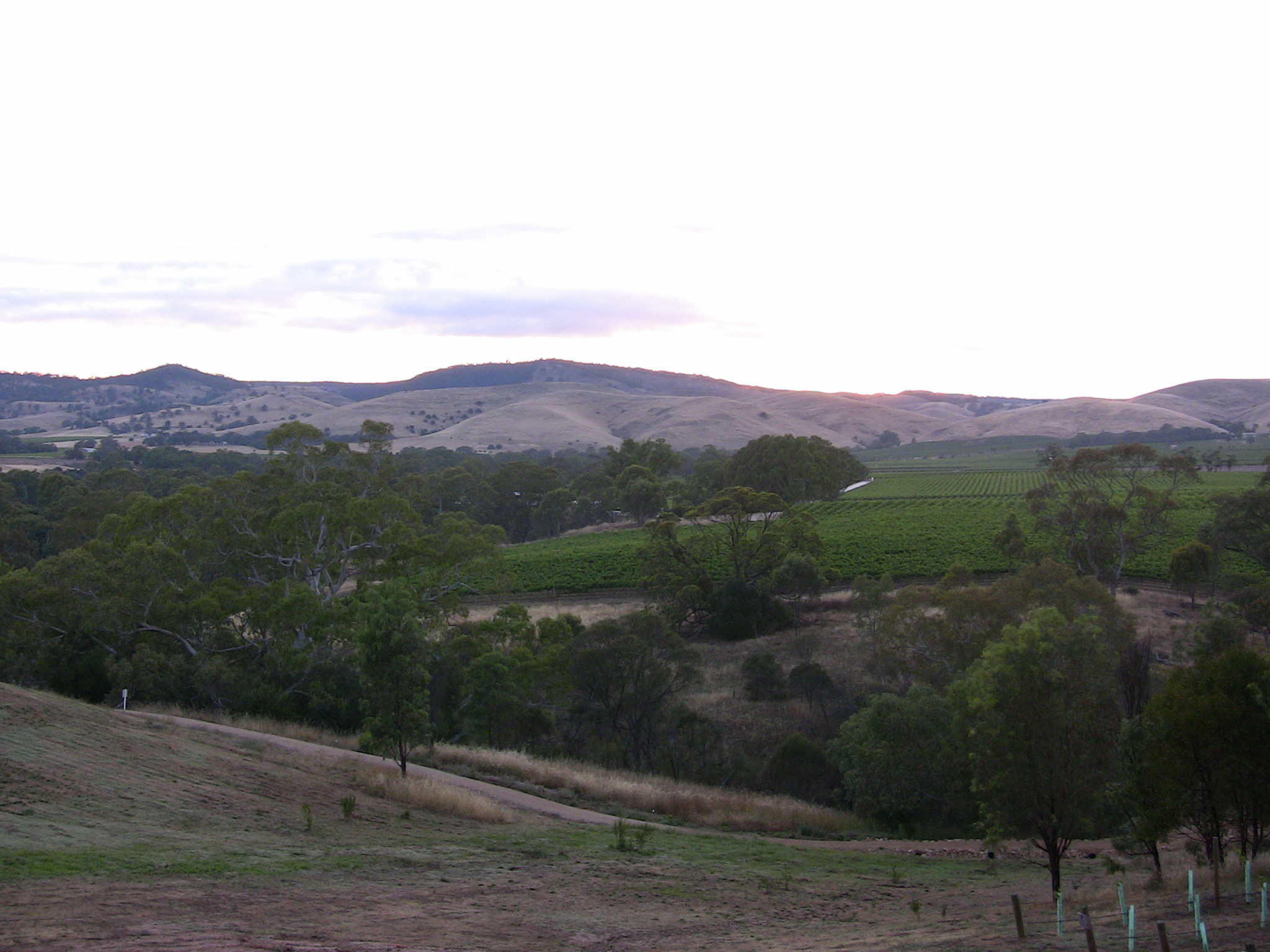
The foothills of the Barossa Ranges offers macroclimates that are quite distinct from the flatter valley floor vineyards featured in lead picture above.

The Barossa Valley has a continental climate but its series of transverse valleys and sloping hills produces a wide range of mesoclimates. Temperatures vary from very warm on the valley floors to progressively cooler at higher altitudes on the hillsides and further North in the valley. Despite its reputation as a "warm climate region", many of the Barossa Valley's climate figures are not that dissimilar from the relatively cooler Margaret River in Western Australia, though the Barossa Valley does have a wider diurnal temperature range. During the heat summation and mean temperatures during the October to April growing season, the region receives about 1710 growing degree days with mean average temperatures during the crucial ripening month of January being around 70 °F (21.4 °C). Rainfall during the growing season averages only around 6.3 inches (160mm), with average relative humidity around 39%, which means that viticultural irrigation is often used. The exception is many of the old vine vineyards on the slightly cooler western side of the valley which is often dry-farmed without irrigation.

== Viticulture and winemaking ==
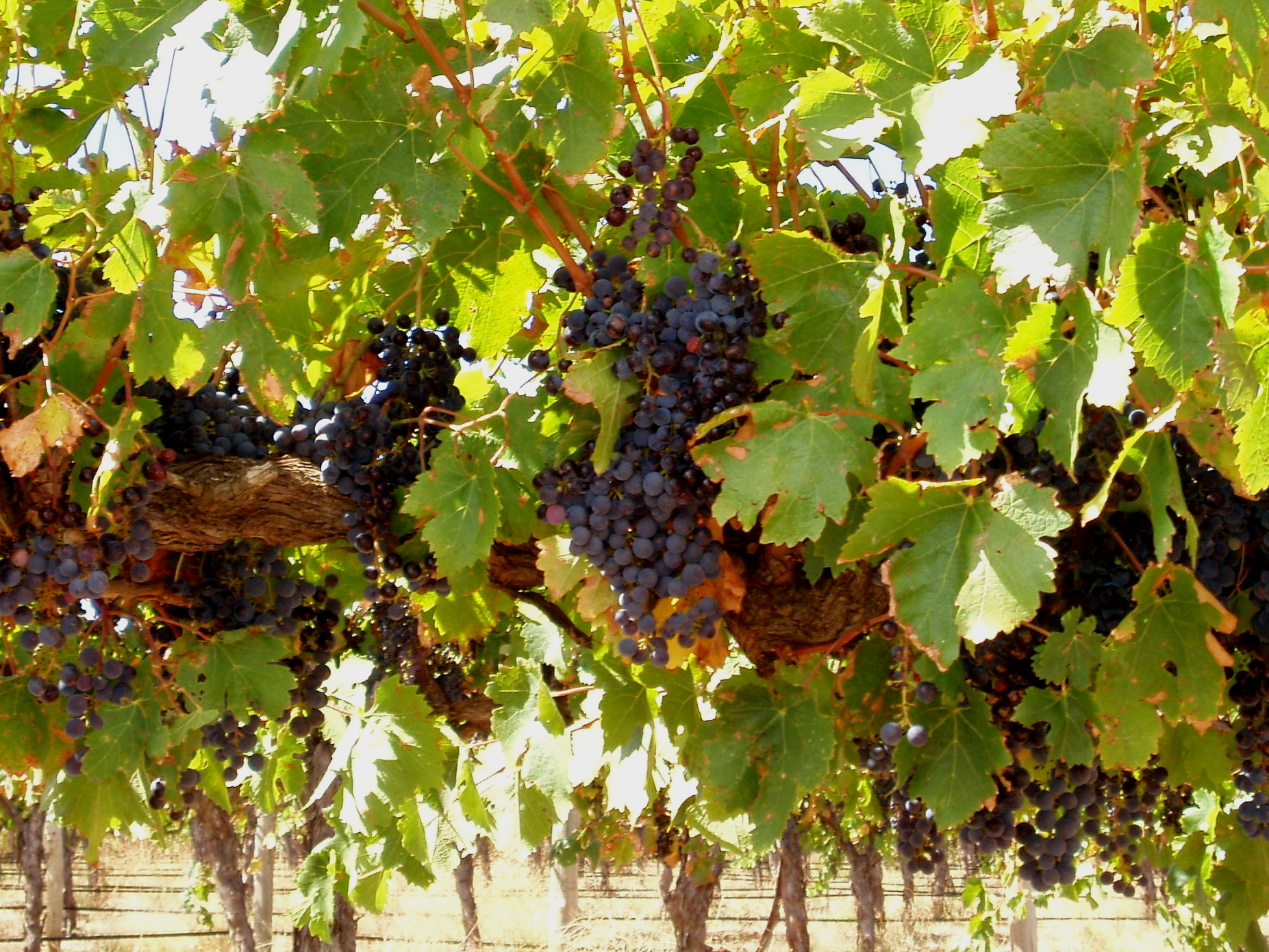
Grapes in the Barossa Valley can get very ripe with high sugar and low acid levels.

Most of the Barossa Valley makes extensive use of irrigation to supplement the region's low rainfall supply during the growing season. However, concerns about water supply in the late 20th and early 21st century led to the development of strict regulations on the numbers and locations of irrigation boreholes as well as the amount of water that can be used by vineyards. Some of the region's oldest vineyards, especially those on the slightly cooler west side of the valley, practice dryland farming. The increased water stress of the practice, coupled with the naturally reduced yields of old vines, tends to produce the most deeply concentrated grapes in the valley which often go into the Barossa Valley 's most expensive and sought after wines. Harvest usually begins in February and may be conducted in the cooler temperatures of night to help maintain acid levels.

The generally hot climate of the Barossa Valley usually means that the grapes become ripe very easily with high levels of sugars and low levels of acids. Winemaking in the Barossa Valley often utilizes the process of acidification in order to add balance to the wine. The high alcohol levels from the fermented sugars may be offset by various winemaking practices including reverse osmosis and adding water to the must. Historically, winemakers in the Barossa Valley have utilized very short maceration periods that limit the amount of time that the wines spends in contact with the skin. Often the wine is racked off the skins into oak wine barrels before fermentation is even completed. While this does mean that supplemental tannins might need to be added, this short maceration often leaves the wines with a smooth mouthfeel. The extensive use of oak is also a characteristic of Barossa Valley winemaking with American oak, with its more aggressive dill and coconut aroma notes, often used more than French oak.

== Grapes and wine ==
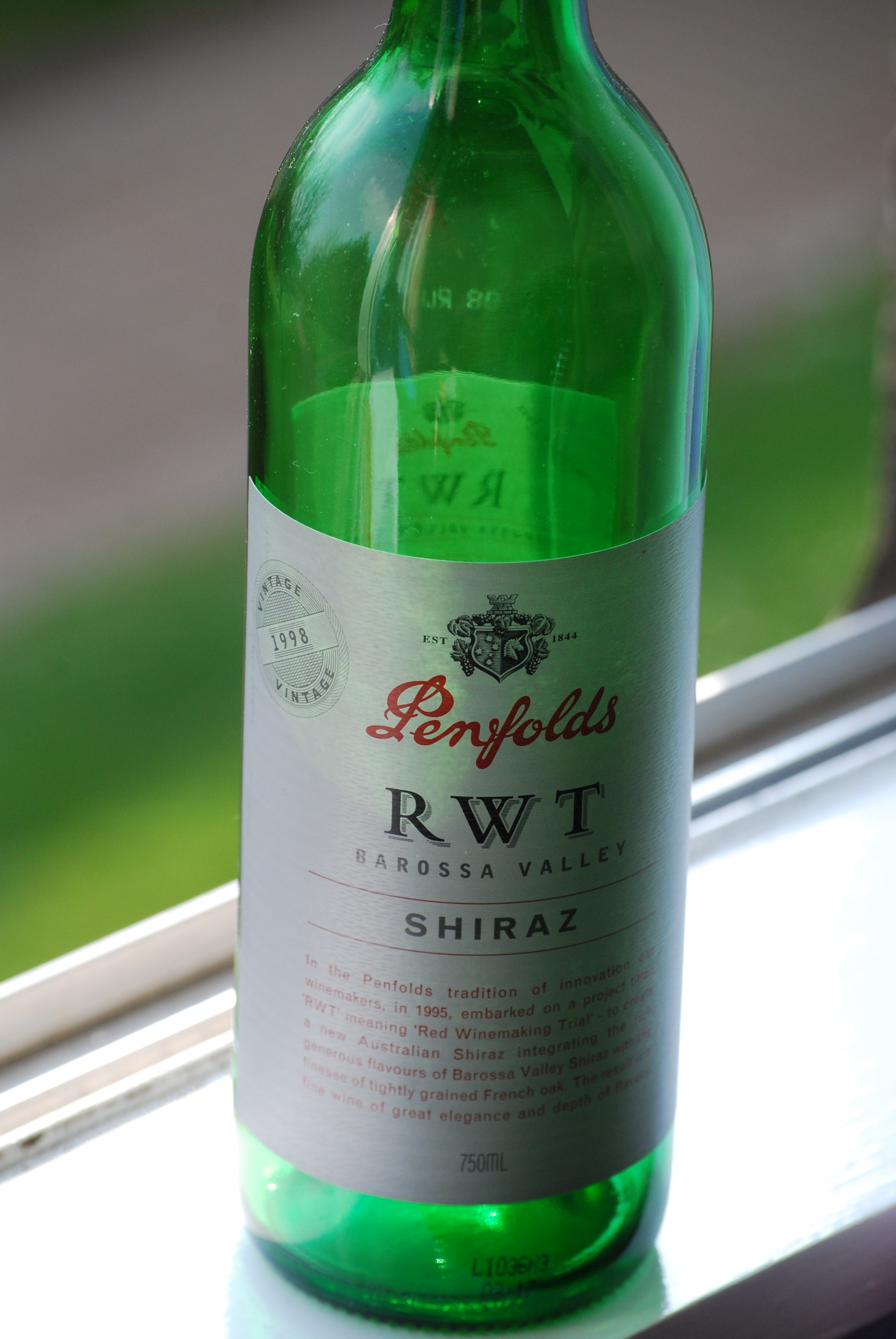
Many of Australia's most well known wines, such as this Penfolds Shiraz, come from the Barossa Valley.

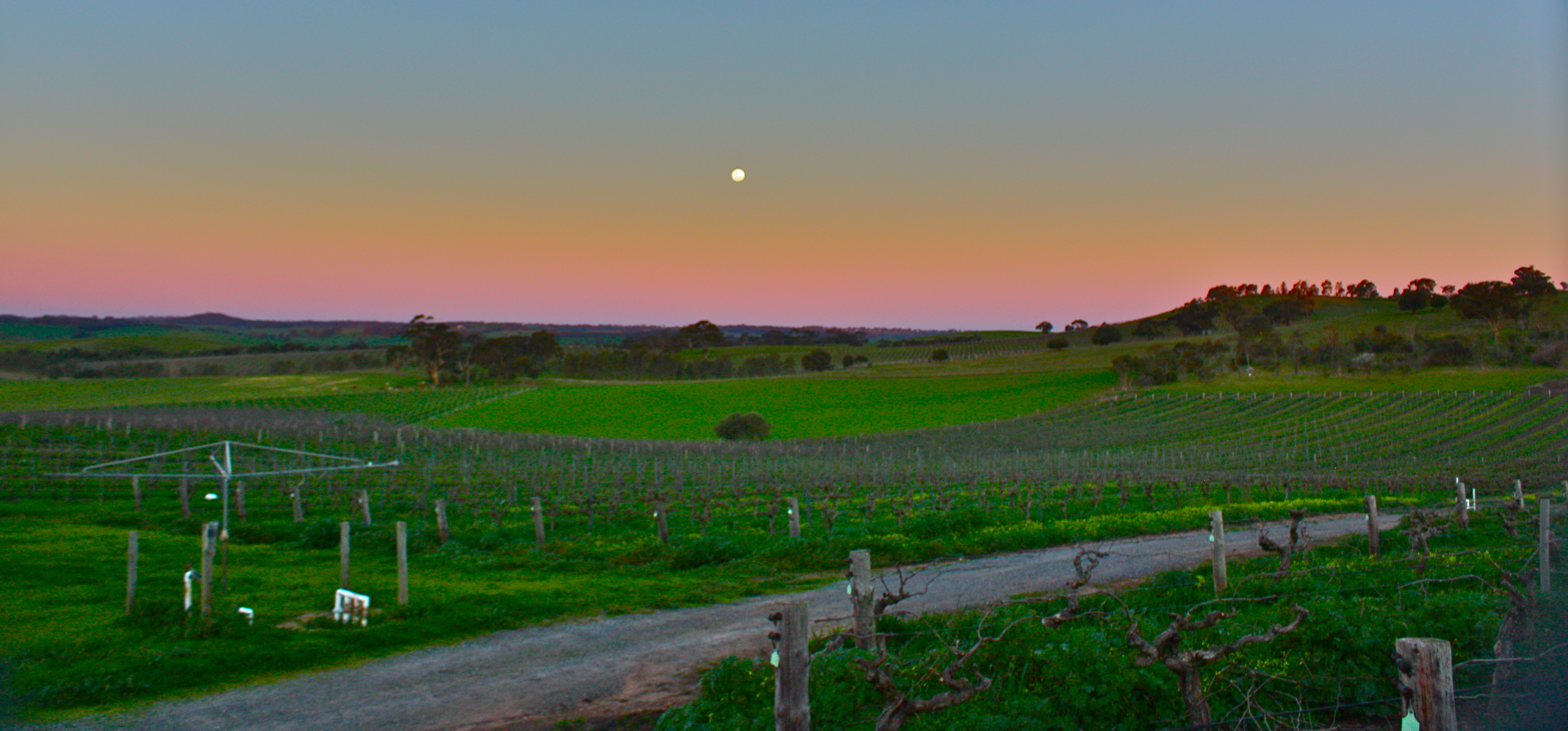
Vineyards in the Barossa Valley at dusk

While the Barossa Valley is most commonly associated with its signature grape variety of Shiraz, the region does grow a number of grape varieties. Among these other varieties are Riesling, Semillon, Chardonnay, Grenache, Mourvedre and Cabernet Sauvignon. The popularity of Syrah has sparked interest in the development of other Rhone varieties, with increase production of Grenache and Mourvedre (also known as Mataro in Australia) for both blending and varietal bottlings. Many of these vines are remnants of the Barossa's fortified wine history and such have substantial age themselves.

Despite its reputation as a red wine region, the Barossa Valley does produce a large amount of white wine. Riesling has been historically important in the region but has gradually shifted eastward to higher elevations and cooler climates of the Barossa Ranges. Many Rieslings labelled with simply "Barossa" will often include more grapes from the cooler Eden Valley wine region than the Barossa Valley. This is permitted as the geographical indication of the Barossa zone also includes the Eden Valley wine region that borders the Barossa Valley wine region to the east and which has developed an international reputation for the quality of its Riesling.

The plantings of Semillon in the Barossa Valley have evolved to develop its own unique pink-skinned clone that is distinctive from the Semillon found in its French homeland of Bordeaux or the internationally known Semillon from the Hunter Valley in New South Wales. Barossa Semillon is characterized by its full body, golden colour and low acidity. Traditionally the wine was fermented in oak but in recent years has been produced more with stainless steel. Barossa Chardonnay is often oaked and subjected to malolactic fermentation which produces a big, full body creamy wine.

== Notable wineries ==
- Charles Melton Wines
- Chateau Tanunda
- Chateau Yaldara
- Elderton Wines
- Hamilton's Ewell Vineyards
- Orlando Wines/Jacob’s Creek
- Penfolds
- Peter Lehmann Wines
- Schiller Vineyards
- Seppelt Winery
- Teusner
- Torbreck Vintners
- Turkey Flat
- Wolf Blass
- Yalumba
