= Cult wine =

Wines bought as a trophy or for investment

Cult wines are wines for which dedicated groups of committed enthusiasts will pay large sums of money.

Cult wines are often seen as trophy wines to be collected or as investment wine to be held rather than consumed. Because price is often seen as an indicator of quality, sellers may adopt a premium pricing strategy where high prices are used to increase the desirability of such wines. This is true even for less expensive wines. For example, one vintner explained that "on several occasions we have had difficulty selling wines at US$75, but as soon as we raise the price to US$125 they sell out and get put on allocation".

== California cult wines ==
California cult wines refers to any of the California wines "typically but not exclusively Napa Valley Cabernets" for which collectors, investors and enthusiastic consumers will pay high prices. The emergence of the cult movement coincided with trends in the 1990s towards riper fruit and wines with bigger and more concentrated flavors.

These wines are generally very expensive, have limited production (often fewer than 600 cases per year) and can sell for several times their "release price" in the secondary market.

== Bordeaux cult wines ==
The cult wines of Bordeaux tend to be left-bank cabernet-based wines that ranked highly in the Classification of 1855.

== See also ==
- Cult brand
- Conspicuous consumption
- Cult following
- Langton’s Classification of Australian Wine
- Luxury good
- Garagistes
