= New South Wales wine =

Wine produced in New South Wales, Australia

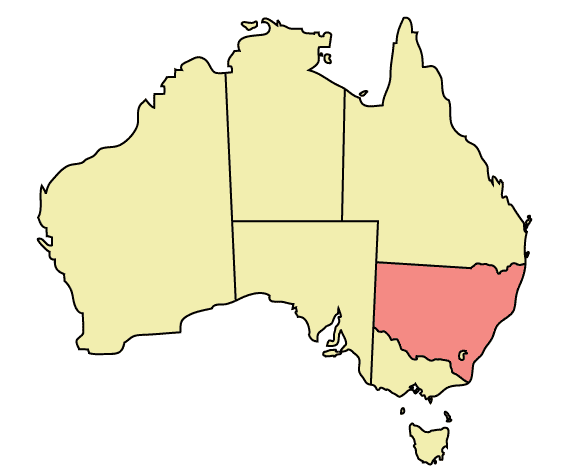
New South Wales (in red)

New South Wales wine is Australian wine produced in New South Wales, Australia. New South Wales is Australia's most populous state and its wine consumption far outpaces the region's wine production. The Hunter Valley, located 130 km (81 mi) north of Sydney, is the most well-known wine region but the majority of the state's production takes place in the Big Rivers zone-Perricoota, Riverina and along the Darling and Murray Rivers. The wines produced from the Big Rivers zone are largely used in box wine and mass-produced wine brands such as Yellow Tail. A large variety of grapes are grown in New South Wales, including Cabernet Sauvignon, Chardonnay, Shiraz and Sémillon.

New South Wales is the second-largest wine-producing state in Australia, accounting for 30 percent of the A$5 billion Australian wine industry In 1994 the various wine regions within New South Wales agreed there was a need to form a peak lobby group to act as the conduit between industry and the New South Wales Government, and to represent New South Wales at the Federal level through the Winemakers Federation of Australia Inc. This body is the New South Wales Wine Industry Association.

== Climate and geography ==
The 800,642 km^{2} (309,130 sq mi) of the New South Wales land mass covers a vast expanse of varying microclimates. Overall, the climate shares some similarities with the French wine region of the Languedoc. The Great Dividing Range has a substantial influence on the climate of many of New South Wales' viticultural areas with areas of higher elevation, such as Orange, Canberra District and Hilltops have cooler climates with more continental influences. The Hunter Valley is very warm, with high humidity and a large amount of rainfall during the growing and harvest season. The Mudgee and Cowra regions and the Big Rivers zone are warm and much drier than the Hunter Valley with several areas requiring irrigation for grape growing.

The soils of New South Wales are similar varied with clay, loam and sandstone being the most common. The Lower Hunter region has several locations with volcanic loam with alluvial sands and silts on the flatter valley vineyards. The Tumbarumba region in the south has soils of basalt and granite with the Hilltops region also having granite based soils with mixtures of basalt and gravels.

== History ==
According to the writings of Watkin Tench, the very first Australian vineyard was planted in New South Wales in 1791 with vines from settlements in South Africa. The vines were planted in the garden of Arthur Phillip, then Governor of the colony, in a site that is now the location of a hotel on Macquarie Street in Sydney. Phillip's early vineyard did not fare well in the hot, humid climate of the region and he sent a request to the British government for assistance in establishing viticulture in the new colony. The government responded by sending two French prisoners of war, under the assumption that all French citizens must know something about making wine. However, neither men had any viticultural training and the most they were able to produce was peach cider.

In 1824, James Busby was awarded a land grant for 800 hectares (1,980 acres) along the Hunter River which he planted with grapevines, studying the techniques that he would include in his 1830 book A Manual of Plain Directions for Planting and Cultivating Vineyards and for Making Wine in New South Wales. In 1831, Busby toured Europe and collected over 600 vine samples from across the continent and shipped them back to Sydney. Many of these vines survived the trip and were cultivated in New South Wales and from there spread across Australia, introducing new varieties to the land. By the mid 19th century, the wine industry of New South Wales was thriving. In 1855, a sparkling wine from the region was featured at the Paris Exposition Universelle, the same exposition that introduced the Bordeaux Wine Official Classification of 1855. The wine was well received and won the honour of being served during the event's closing ceremonies at the state banquet of Napoleon III.

== Wine regions ==
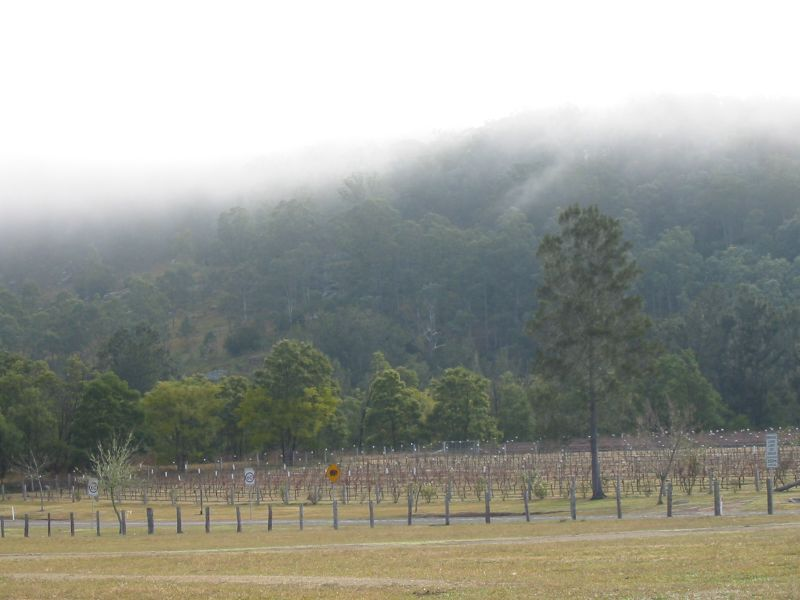
A vineyard in the Hunter Valley.

Any grape grown in New South Wales can be included in wine produced under the "Southeastern Australia" appellation which also includes grapes grown in Victoria, Tasmania and parts of Queensland and South Australia. The state has eight larger Australian Geographical Indication (GI) zones which are divided into smaller regions and occasionally, sub-regions as follows:

- Big Rivers – includes the regions of Perricoota, Riverina plus Murray Darling and Swan Hill which are shared with the state of Victoria
- Central Ranges – includes the regions of Cowra, Mudgee and Orange.
- Hunter Valley – includes the Upper Hunter Valley, Broke Fordwich and Pokolbin subregions of the Hunter Valley wine region.
- Northern Rivers – includes the region of Hastings River
- Northern Slopes – includes the region of New England Australia
- South Coast – includes the regions of Shoalhaven Coast and Southern Highlands
- Southern New South Wales – includes the regions of Canberra District, Gundagai, Hilltops and Tumbarumba
- Western Plains, no defined regions

=== Hunter Valley ===
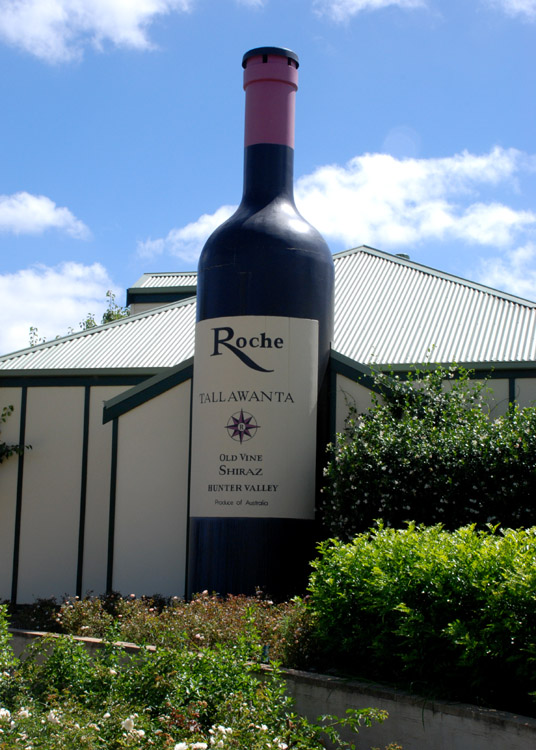
Tourism is important to the Hunter Valley wine industry. Here a winery in Pokolbin has created a massive wine bottle replica outside of its winery.

The Hunter Valley has benefited from its close location to Sydney with the tourism and recognition that follows. Collectively the region accounts for 3% of the grapes used in wine production throughout Australia and is most noted for its unique Sémillon. The region is further subdivided into an Upper and Lower Hunter region with the Lower Hunter producing more red wine from grapes like Cabernet Sauvignon and Shiraz. In the 19th century, Verdelho was one of the most popular plantings in the Hunter only to later go into decline in the 20th century before seeing a recent increase in plantings. Various wine producers have experimented with planting Pinot noir, Riesling and Sauvignon blanc but the results have not been very successful due in part to the Hunter's harsh climate of heat, humidity and abundant rainfall during the growing and harvest seasons.

Much of the success of the Hunter Valley region as a wine-producing region can be attributed to the legendary winemaker Maurice O'Shea, who helped pioneer the region as a suitable place for premium wine growing and also helped transform the greater Australian wine industry. From his Mount Pleasant Estate in Pokolbin, he began producing some of the nation's most recognised and acclaimed table wines, helping shift the Australian fascination with spirits and fortified wines to table wines. Mount Pleasant was purchased by the McWilliam family in 1931 and remains at O'Shea's original site, utilising the same vines and vineyards as he did.

Hunter Valley Sémillon is typically produced dry with low alcohol levels often less than 10%. This lower alcohol level is achieved, despite the region's warm weather, by picking the grapes slightly under ripe to help maintain acidity levels. Producers will often ferment Sémillon in oak with additional barrel ageing to enhance the mouthfeel and texture. The wines are characterised by buttery, honey nut flavours and an ability to age for several decades, often hitting their peak between 10 and 20 years. As the wine ages, they can develop lime flavour and burnt toast aromas. Historically, Sémillon was known as "Hunter Riesling" even though the grape has no relation to true Riesling. One of the first commercially successful Chardonnays produced in Australia was by Murray Tyrrell in the Hunter Valley in 1971. Tyrell's vineyard was planted with Chardonnay cuttings that he "borrowed" from Penfolds' experimental plantings by hopping over their barb-wire fence one night and pruning their vines. Hunter Valley Chardonnays are characterised by their soft texture, high alcohol and viscosity with peach flavour notes.

Cabernet Sauvignon was first planted in the Hunter in 1963 by Lake's Folly Winery in Pokolbin. Shiraz has a long history in the region and is particularly noted for its "sweaty saddle" aroma. The terroir of the region's volcanic basalt soil was originally thought to be the cause of the "sweaty saddle" aroma, but research has proven this to be a wine fault of volatile phenols caused by the winemaking yeast Brettanomyces. Hunter Shirazes are often very tannic with the ability to age for 20–30 years. They are characterised by earthy flavours with tar notes with well-made examples having the potential to take on Rhône-like qualities as they age.

=== Central Ranges ===
The Central Ranges GI includes the sub-regions of Cowra, Mudgee and Orange. Cowra is the warmest wine region in the Central ranges, located at a lower altitude and on flatter terrain than the other two sub-regions. The area has the potential for high yields, especially when irrigation is employed, which creates varying ranges of quality throughout the region. Chardonnay is the most popular Cowra planting followed by Cabernet Sauvignon, Shiraz and Merlot. Most of the vineyards in the Orange region are located on the hillsides near the extinct volcano Mount Canobolas. With elevations between 600–1,050 meters (1,970–3,440 ft), Orange is one of the coolest regions in New South Wales. Chardonnay and Cabernet Sauvignon are the main plantings here followed by Merlot and Shiraz.

The Mudgee region is one of the oldest wine regions in Australia and has the longest, unbroken history of viticulture in New South Wales. It was first planted in 1858 and was never affected by the phylloxera epidemic that hit Australia in the late 19th century. Much of Mudgee is planted with red wine varietals such as Cabernet Sauvignon and Shiraz though the area is home to a unique clone of Chardonnay that is virtually virus-free. Australia's first organic wine estate, Botobolar Vineyard, was founded in the Mudgee region of Phillip County.

=== South Coast ===
The South Coast region includes the Shoalhaven Coast, Eurobodalla and Southern Highlands. These regions are within 100 km of the NSW Coastline between Sydney and the Victorian border.

=== Southern New South Wales ===
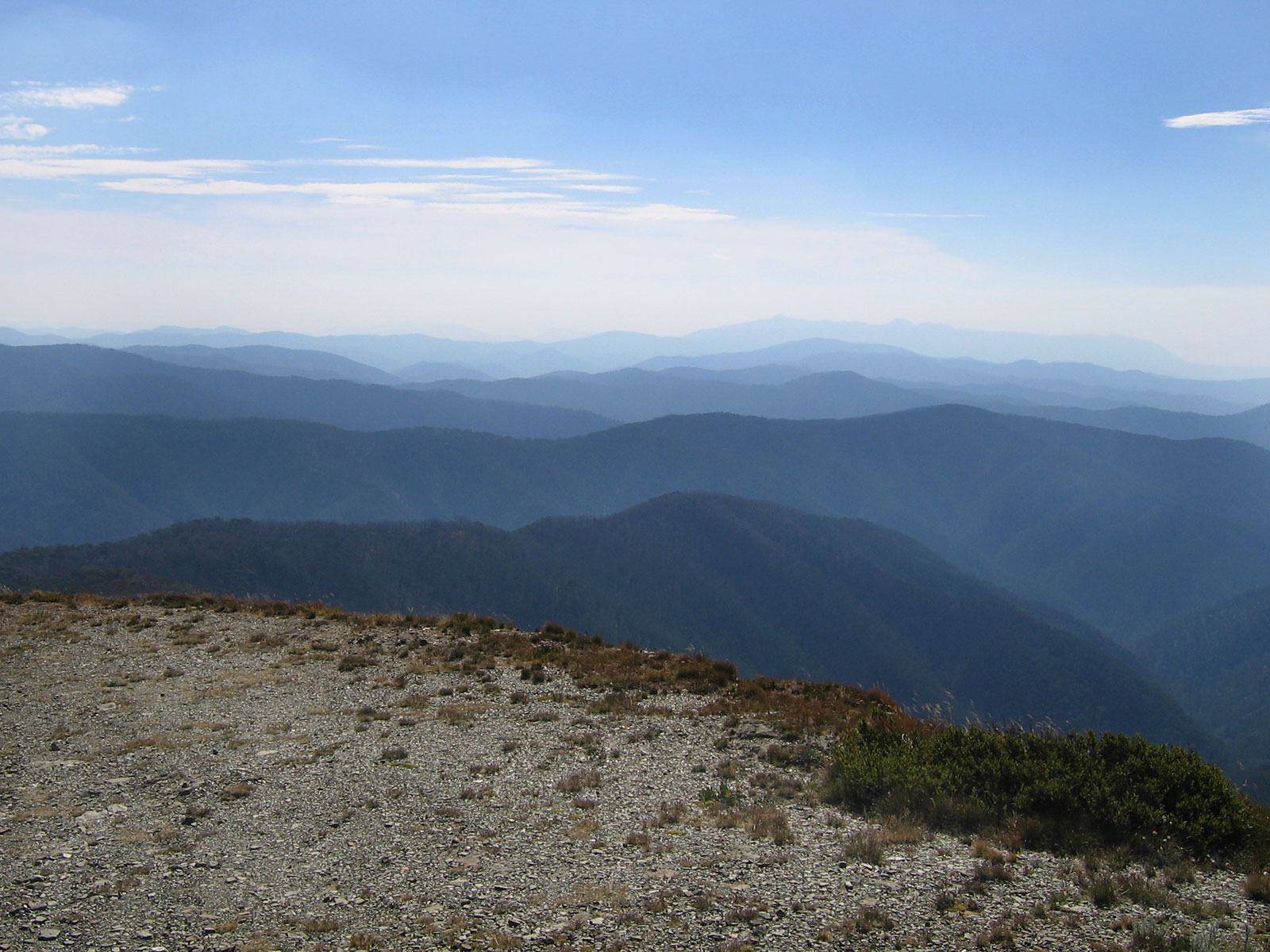
The Australian Alps

The Southern New South Wales GI includes the regions of Canberra District (including part of the Australian Capital Territory), Gundagai, Hilltops and Tumbarumba. The Tumbarumba region is located in the foothills of the Australian Alps and is the coolest region in New South Wales, performing well with white wine and cool climate varietals. The Hilltops region shares a similar climate with the Orange region of the Central Ranges-warm daytime temperatures and cool nights during the growing season followed by cool autumn days during the harvest season. The Shiraz from the Hilltops region are noted for their black pepper flavours, which are more Old World Syrah like than typical spicy and rich Australian Shiraz. The Canberra District wine region is located in and around the Australian Capital Territory and the city of Canberra. The wine industry of the region is heavily dominated by local consumption and tourism trade. The area shares a similar continental climate with Hilltops and Orange. A wide variety of grapes are grown here including Chardonnay, Pinot noir, Riesling, Shiraz and Viognier. The Canberra winery Clonakilla helped to popularise the resurgence of the Côte-Rôtie AOC style of blending Viognier with Shiraz.

=== Big Rivers zone ===
The Big Rivers zone GI is the largest-producing wine area in New South Wales and is similar to the Riverland area of South Australia. The major wine-producing centre is located around the Riverina area, which is also known as the Murrumbidgee Irrigation Area, and the city of Griffith where the major crush facilities are located. After Riverland, this is Australia's second most prolific wine-producing region and is responsible for many of Australia's box and mass-produced wine brands. Along the Murrumbidgee River, Sémillon and Shiraz are the most popular plantings.

== Wine industry ==
New South Wales presents a sizable market for the consumption of local wines and Sydney, as well as the nation's capital, Canberra, are gateway cities for wine tourism. The wine industry of New South Wales is reflective of the industry throughout Australia, with a strong presence of large firms and smaller boutique wineries. Some of the first New South Wales wines to gain widespread commercial recognition, in Australia and abroad, were the Shiraz-based "Hermitage" wine from McWilliam's and the Sémillon-based "Chablis" wine from Lindemans. Other large wineries, such as De Bortoli Wines, Yellow Tail and Rosemount all were founded in this state.
