= Hunter Valley zone =

Hunter Valley zone may refer to:

- Hunter Valley, a geographical region of New South Wales, Australia
- wine-producing region in the Hunter Region
