= Gil Wahlquist =

Australian journalist and winemaker

- Born: Eric Gilbert Wahlquist; 11 April 1927; Moonee Ponds, Victoria, Australia
- Died: 7 December 2012 (aged 85); Hunters Hill, NSW, Australia
- Occupations: Journalist, winemaker

Gil Wahlquist (1927–2012) was an Australian journalist and "pioneer organic wine producer" who was largely responsible for re-establishing the Mudgee wine industry and raising the international profile of the Australian wine industry in the 1970s.

== Early life and career ==
Gil Wahlquist was born Eric Gilbert Wahlquist in the Melbourne suburb of Moonee Ponds, Victoria, on 11 April 1927. His parents were Eric Wahlquist, a theatre manager, and his wife, Ellen (nee Limbrick). Eric's father was a Swede who had jumped ship at Port Pirie, South Australia and married into an Australian family of German descent.

During his high school years Wahlquist worked on the school magazine and developed an interest in journalism. From early in his life he was interested in movies and in music, especially jazz.

He worked as a part time radio copywriter with radio station 5KA in Adelaide and then in 1944 during the Second World War he enlisted in the Royal Australian Navy as an ordinary seaman and served on HMAS Rockhampton, a corvette.

After the war he attended the University of Adelaide and edited On Dit, the student union's newspaper there. On 13 May 1950 he married Vincie Porter. He worked at The News in Adelaide and during that period he was a member of the Fabian Society. In 1956 he moved to Sydney and worked as a journalist with The Sydney Morning Herald. As a sideline he reviewed records, especially of jazz, folk and pop, and wrote a weekly column "What's new on record" for Sydney's Sun Herald.

In 1958 he took up a position with Sydney's TV Times where he would work for ten years. In those years he developed an interest in sailing, built a number of boats, and helped found the Australian Sabot Sailing Association. He then worked with Nielsen McCarthy, a public relations company.

== Mudgee ==
In 1971 Gil and Vincie Wahlquist, seeking a slower-paced lifestyle, moved to Mudgee, a town in the central west of New South Wales. They purchased land there and named it the Botobolar Vineyard. They planted wine grapes and waited for plants to grow. In the meantime Gil signed on as editor of the Mudgee Guardian newspaper (on a third of his original salary in the city) and also launched the Botobolar Bugle, which would become "Australia’s longest-running winery newsletter". Vincie worked as a teacher at Mudgee Public School.

In 1974 the grapes were ready for harvesting but, finding the selling price was very low, he decided to make his own wine.

He introduced a number of innovations to the industry. The first was to reject the use of "clean cultivation" (in which weeds were removed and the earth under the vines left bare), preferring to leave weeds in place which pests could then eat instead of the vines. The second was to refuse to spray DDT in order to kill pests such as cutworms. Instead he chose to use organic growing methods and "developed a system of farming with herbicides or pesticides", such as using "only organically acceptable chemicals, such as winter oil, a mixture of lime and sulphur and a dusting of sulphur". In so doing he produced preservative-free wine. According to Huon Hooke, "Botobolar was the first and for many years the only Australian vineyard accredited by the National Association of Sustainable Agriculture".

Apart from pioneering the organic wine industry in Australia, he was a "tireless promoter" for the Mudgee district's wines and for Australian wines more generally, establishing the Mudgee Wine Grape Growers Association, Mudgee Small Farms Field Days, Mudgee Wine Show and Mudgee Wine Week and setting up Australia-wide associations for small winemakers and sustainable agriculture. He and his fellow vignerons persuaded the New South Wales Department of Education to set up a six-month course in viticulture at Mudgee Technical College, beginning in 1974.

Wahlquist strongly advocated the introduction of an Australian appelation contrôlée system under which "labels would certify that the wines were grown with grapes grown in the Mudgee area" and would lead to "stringent methods of production and marketing" with the final outcome being in the "development of a distinctive regional wine style in Australia".

Grapes had been grown in the Mudgee area by three German families, including that of Adam Roth, as early as 1858. Grape growing reached a peak with 55 vineyards in the locality in 1893, which was followed by an industry decline during the hard times of 1890s. Following Wahlquist's arrival and innovations from 1971, large and small vineyards started planting vines in Mudgee once again and the district's industry prospered.

In 2008 Barry Buffier of the New South Wales Government's Industry & Investment NSW stated: "Mr Wahlquist is almost single-handedly responsible for establishing the Mudgee wine industry, and training the next generation of wine industry employees. He persuaded Mudgee wine and food producers to work together for the recognition of their region as a premium food producer, and the region's viticulture industry is now worth an estimated $45 million annually." Mr Buffier thanked Wahlquist for raising "Australia's profile in the international wine industry", part of which he had achieved by convincing the Federal Minister for Agriculture in 1993 to fund the first promotion of Australian wines overseas.

== Hunters Hill ==
In 1994 Wahlquist and his wife sold their vineyard to Kevin and Trina Karstrom and moved to Hunters Hill, a suburb in the lower north shore of Sydney. They became involved in a number of local groups such as the Hunters Hill Trust, the Hunters Hill Historical Society, the Hunters Hill Probus Club, and the Hunters Hill Museum, and "worked tirelessly" for the benefit of seniors.

He continued to contribute to the Botobolar Bugle and for four years he wrote for the 2MS FM magazine.

== Personal life ==
Walhquist died at home in Hunters Hill on 7 December 2012 "with his wife Vincie at his side".

Gil and Vincie had four children, Åsa Karin, a Walkley Award winning journalist, Roland, previously the CEO of the Australian winemaker Brown Brothers, Janet, and Nancy, all of whom survived him. One of his grandchildren, Calla Wahlquist, is a journalist with The Guardian.

== Award and honours ==
- 2001: Centenary Medal - for service to the community
- 2002: Hunters Hill Citizen of the Year
- 2009: Graham Gregory Award - for his contribution to the NSW wine industry
- 2020: Wahlquist Street, Strathnairn, Australian Capital Territory - named in his honour

== Bibliography ==
=== Books ===
- HMAS Rockhampton: Australian Corvette in World War II, Hunters Hill, N.S.W.: Gilbert Wahlquist, 2005.
- Some of My Best Friends Are Winemakers: A History of the Wine Industry of Mudgee, Hunters Hill, N.S.W.: Gilbert Wahlquist, 2008.

=== Book sections ===
- Foreword to: Mudgee: A Nest in the Hills, Mudgee, N.S.W.: Mudgee Historical Society, Mudgee, 1981.

=== Articles ===
- "The three ages of Bob Dylan", The Sun-Herald, 3 March 1968, p. 96. Joint author: Diana Drake.
- "Roth, Adam (1827–1898)", in Australian Dictionary of Biography; first published in hardcopy of Australian Dictionary of Biography, Volume 11, Melbourne University Press, 1988.
- "Rowing heritage at Henley", Hunters Hill Trust Journal, Vol. XXIV, No. 2, April 1997.
- "Tyrrell, Edward George Young (Dan) (1871–1959)", in Australian Dictionary of Biography; first published in hardcopy of Australian Dictionary of Biography, Volume 16, Melbourne University Press, 2002.
- "HMAS Castlemaine, a ship re-born", Naval Historical Review, March 2005.
- "Submarine in the Bush – Holbrook NSW", Naval Historical Review, March 2006.
