= Orange wine region =

Orange
- Wine region
- Year established: 1997
- Country: Australia
- Part of: Central Ranges
- Location: 33.4°S 149.1°E
- Climate region: Maritime
- Heat units: 1200–1309
- Precipitation (annual average): 440 millimetres (17 in)

Orange is a wine region and Australian Geographical Indication in the Central Ranges zone in the Australian state of New South Wales. It is named for the town of Orange and defined as the contiguous area that is above 600 metres (2,000 ft) elevation within the City of Orange, Cabonne Shire and Blayney Shire.

Grape vines were first planted commercially in 1980. The region is defined to be above the 600 metres (2,000 ft) contour line. Orange is 260 kilometres (160 mi) (3½ hours drive) west of Sydney and 295 kilometres (183 mi) north of Canberra.

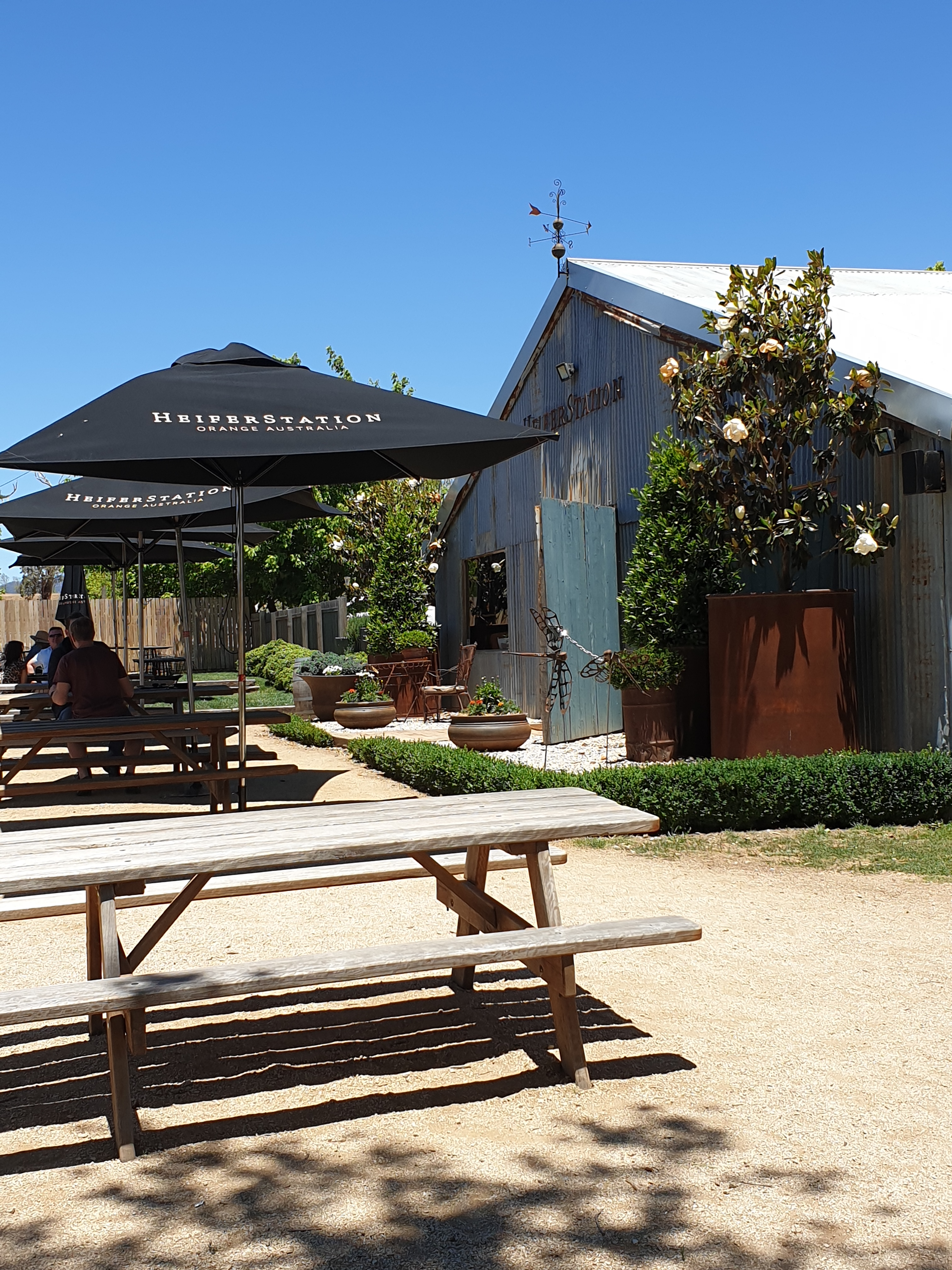
Heifer Station winery

== Wineries in Orange ==
- Atallah Wines
- Amour Wines
- Angullong Vineyard
- Bloodwood
- Borrodell on the Mount
- Brangayne of Orange
- Byrne Farm Wines
- Canobolas Wines
- Cargo Road Winery
- Carillion Wines
- Centium Vineyard
- ChaLou Wines
- Colmar Estate
- Cooks Lot
- Cumulus Estate
- Dindima
- De Salis
- Faisan Estate
- Habitat Vineyard
- Heifer Station Vineyard
- Highland Heritage
- HOOSEGG Wines
- Logan Wines
- Mayfield Vineyard
- Macquariedale Organic Wines
- Mortimers Wines
- Nashdale Lane
- Oculus Wines
- Orange Mountain Wines
- Patina
- Philip Shaw
- Printhie / Swift
- Rikard Wines
- Ross Hill
- Rowlee Wines
- See Saw Wines
- Slow Wine Co.
- Stockman's Ridge
- Strawhouse Wines
- Swinging Bridge
- Tamburlaine
- Word of Mouth Wines
- Zinga Wines

Wineries that use Orange region grapes in their wines include Brokenwood Wines (Hunter Valley based), Tyrrell's Wines (Hunter Valley), Robert Stein (Mudgee), Samantha May Wines (Mudgee), Clark Wines (Mudgee), Jessop Wines (Mudgee), Manners Wines (Mudgee), Eloquesta (Mudgee) and Lowe Wines (Mudgee). In 2007, South Australian based Penfolds winery released the 2007 Penfolds Bin 311 Orange Region Chardonnay.
