= David Lowe (winemaker) =

Australian winemaker

David Lowe (born 1958) is an Australian winemaker who has held various wine industry positions, including President of the New South Wales wine Industry Association; Vice President of the Winemakers' Federation of Australia; member of the strategic NSW Ministers' Wine Advisory Council, and President of the Mudgee Wine Grape Growers Association.

In 2013 the NSW Minister for Agriculture awarded David the Graham Gregory Award for his contribution to the NSW Wine Industry. Following this, in February 2014, Wine Communicators of Australia awarded David Lowe the inaugural 2014 Legend of the Vine Award.

== History ==
David Lowe is a descendant of the magistrate Robert Lowe, who was granted 1,000 acres (4.0 km2) in the parish of Bringelly, New South Wales in 1812 and is believed to be the first British settler in the area.

David Lowe attended Hurlstone Agricultural High School in Sydney. In 1979 he graduated from Roseworthy Agricultural College in South Australia with a Bachelor of Science (Oenology).

== Winemaking ==
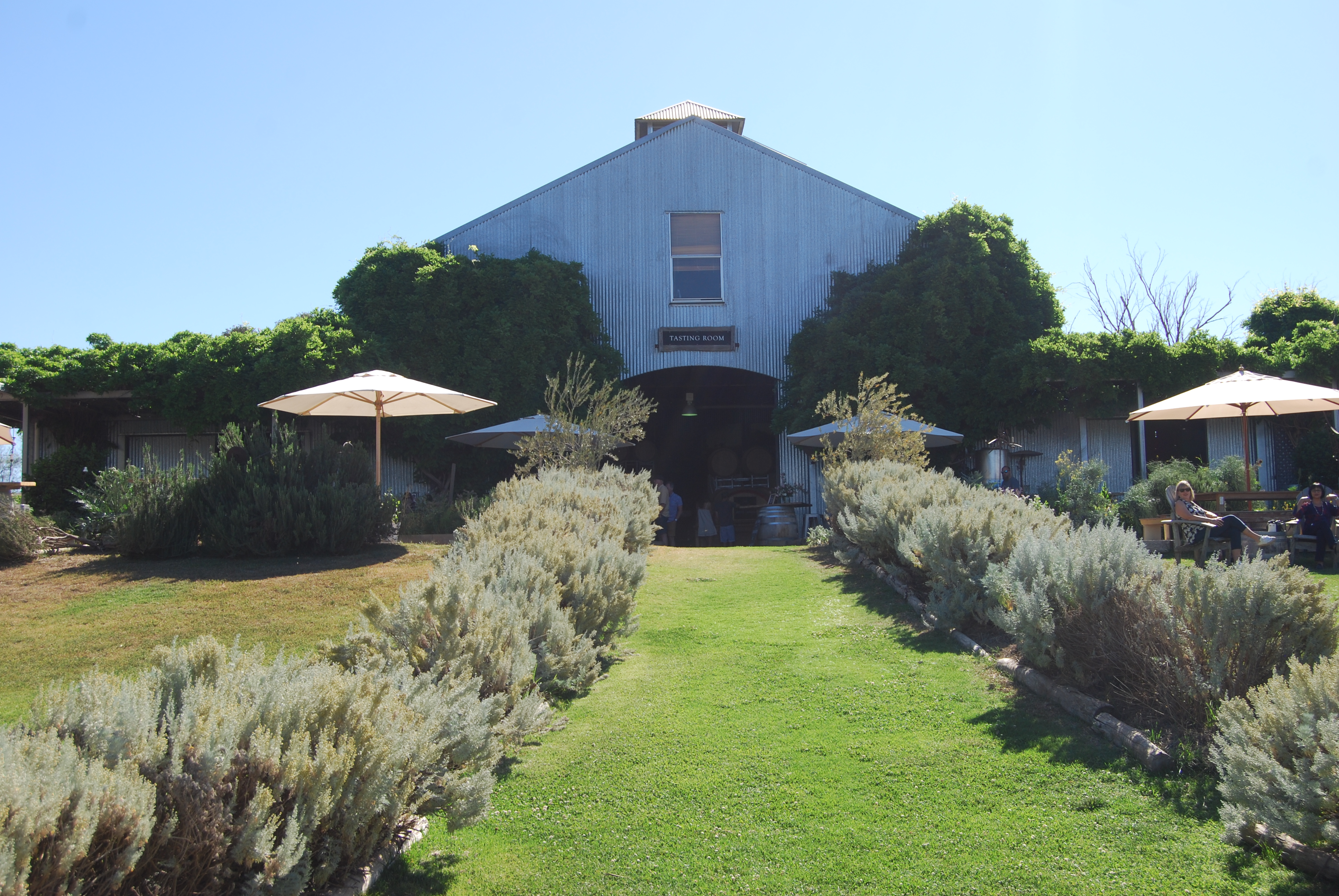
Lowe Wines, Mudgee

After graduation he was appointed Assistant Winemaker at Rothbury Estate in the Hunter Valley. David subsequently became Chief Winemaker and Group Vineyard Manager for Rothbury Estate where he worked closely with Len Evans and Murray Tyrrell. David Lowe left Rothbury Estate in 1991.

In 2000 David Lowe established his winery on Tinja Lane in Mudgee, New South Wales.

The 2003 Lowe Reserve Zinfandel was awarded the Best Zinfandel trophy at the 2005 International Wine Challenge and the following vintage, the 2004 won a gold medal at the 2006 Challenge.

In 2010 Lowe Wines merged with Louee Wines from Rylstone, New South Wales.

Lowe's 2009 Zinfandel was awarded the 'Red Wine of the Show' and the 'Wine of the Show' at the 2011 Australia / New Zealand Organic Wine Show.

== See also ==
- List of Wine Personalities
- Hurlstone Agricultural High School Alumni
- Roseworthy College
