= Upper Hunter Valley =

Upper Hunter Valley may refer to:

- Part of the Hunter Valley, a geographical region of New South Wales, Australia
- wine-producing region in the Hunter Valley
