= Huntington Estate Wines =

Australian winery

- Location: Ulan Road, Mudgee NSW 2850, NSW, Australia
- Wine region: Mudgee wine region
- Founded: 1969
- Key people: Tim Stevens, Nicky Stevens, Bob Roberts, Wendy Roberts, Susie Roberts
- Known for: Cabernet Sauvignon
- Varietals: Cabernet Sauvignon, Shiraz, Chardonnay, Merlot, Chardonnay, Semillon
- Distribution: International
- Tasting: Open to public, Monday to Friday: 10.00am - 4.00pm / Sunday & Public Holidays: 10.00am - 4.00pm / Saturday: 10.00am - 5.00pm /Closed Christmas Day & New Years Day
- Website: Huntington Estate

Huntington Estate is an Australian winery based in Mudgee, New South Wales owned and operated by Tim and Nicky Stevens.

== History ==
The winery was established in 1969 by Sydney solicitor Bob Roberts and his wife Wendy. Bob purchased 140 acres of land from fruit grower Kath Leggatt and farmer Marcel Ribeaux. He planted 20 acres of vines. The winery was built in 1972 and was designed and built by Bob Roberts, and constructed from concrete blocks.

By 1980 Huntington Estate comprised 100 acres of vines including shiraz, cabernet sauvignon, pinot noir, merlot, semillon and chardonnay. In 1998 Bob Roberts was awarded the Graham Gregory award acknowledging an individual's outstanding contribution to the NSW wine industry.

In 2005, upon the retirement of Bob and Wendy Roberts, Tim Stevens purchased the Huntington Estate business. Tim Stevens had been a journalist prior to purchasing the neighbouring Abercorn vineyard in 1996.

Huntington Estate is also known for the Huntington Estate Music Festival, which was held each year in the winery's barrel hall up until the final performance in 2019. The week long concerts were last directed by Artistic Director Carl Vine, and comprised a collection of prominent international artists alongside Australian musicians. The Festival has been described as "a world-class annual festival of chamber music."

== Winemaker ==
Huntington Estate wines are made by owner Tim Stevens. Prior to purchasing Huntington Estate Wines, Tim was the owner and winemaker at Abercorn Wines, a neighbouring vineyard to Huntington Estate.

== Awards ==
At the 2018 Mudgee Wine Show, the 2015 Huntington Estate Late Harvest Semillon was awarded the Trophy for the Most Outstanding Sweet Wine of the Show (for class 16 & 17)

== See also ==
- Australian wine
- Mudgee wine region
