= Julie Posetti =

Australian journalist and academic

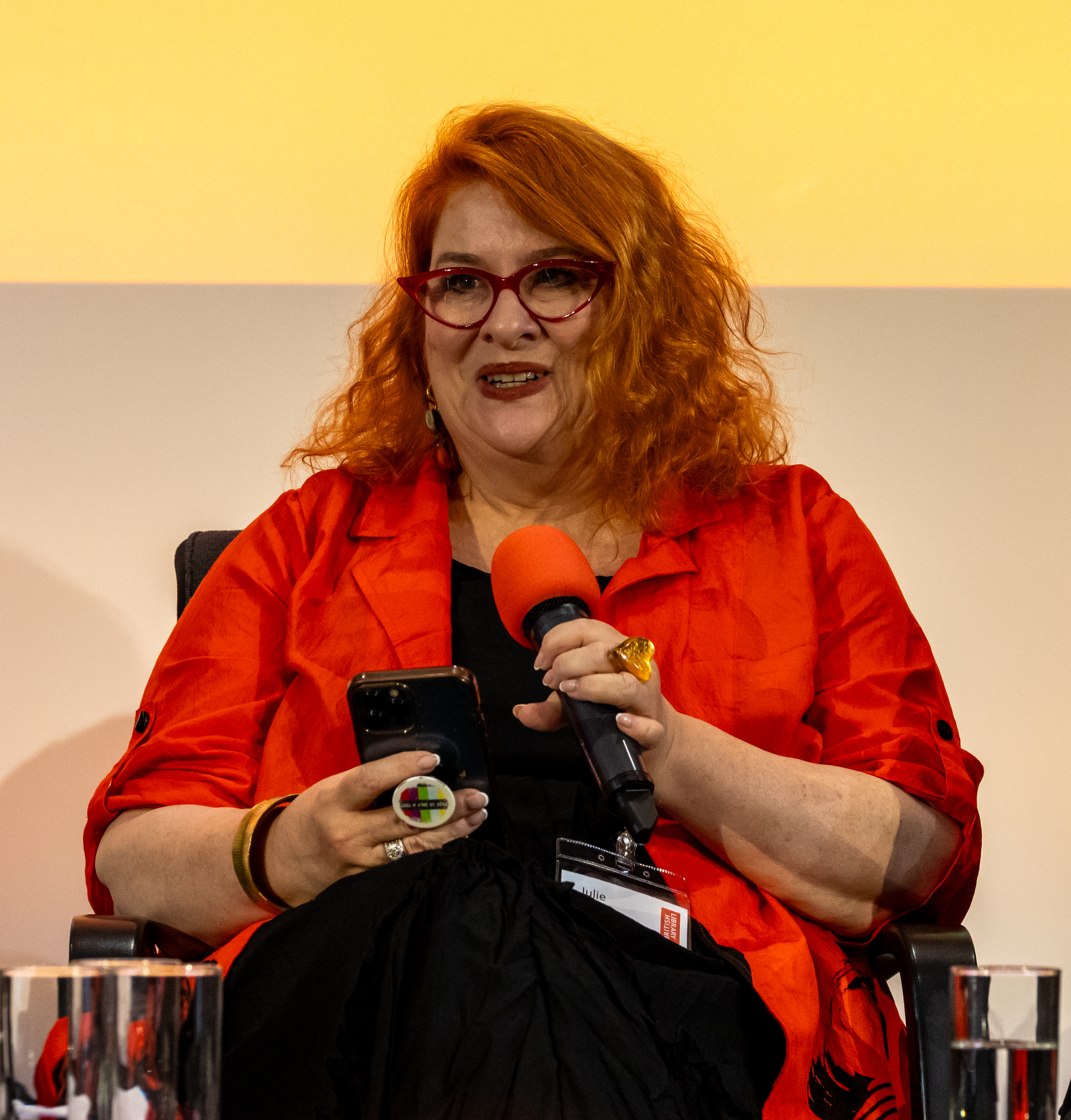
- Julie Posetti in 2025
- Occupations: Journalist, researcher
- Employer: University of Oxford

Julie Posetti is an Australian journalist and academic.

== Career ==
In 1992, she became the ABC's Regional News Editor based in Wollongong. From there, in 1994, she joined ABC TV Documentaries as a reporter on the series Living in the 90s. In 1996, she joined ABC Radio Current Affairs' national programs AM, PM and The World Today as a Sydney-based reporter, before heading to Canberra as an ABC political correspondent in the Federal Press Gallery. After initially studying politics and history at the University of Wollongong, she graduated with a Bachelor of Communications (Journalism) degree from the University of Canberra. In 2005, she was appointed lecturer in journalism at the University of Canberra. She moved to the University of Wollongong (UOW) to join the Journalism School within the Faculty of Creative Arts in 2013. In 2013-2014, she was based in Paris on secondment with WAN-IFRA and the World Editors forum as Research Fellow and Editor. She holds a PhD from the University of Wollongong. Her dissertation focused on journalistic source protection, privacy, media freedom and digital rights.

In 2018, she was appointed Senior Research Fellow with the Reuters Institute for the Study of Journalism (RISJ) at the University of Oxford. There, she leads RISJ's new Journalism Innovation Project. Posetti is the author of UNESCO's landmark global study 'Protecting Journalism Sources in the Digital Age' (2017) which examined the erosion of journalistic source protection conventions essential to investigative journalism in the context of national security overreach, and widening surveillance nets. Based in Paris in 2013 and 2014 as a Research Fellow and Editor with the World Association of Newspapers and News Publishers (WAN-IFRA) and the World Editors Forum, she edited the flagship publications Trends in Newsrooms 2014 and Trends in Newsrooms 2015

== "#Twitdef" ==
In 2010, she was targeted by the newspaper The Australian and threatened with legal action, after reporting, via Twitter, critical comments made by one of the newspaper's former reporters during a journalism conference in Sydney. This episode became known as "Twitdef"

Posetti was the subject of Australia's first threatened Twitter lawsuit but no writ was ever issued by the man who made the threat, Editor-in-Chief of The Australian, Chris Mitchell. On 25 November 2010, while at the Journalism Education Association of Australia conference in Sydney, Posetti used Twitter to cite part of a presentation by rural reporter Asa Wahlquist, who suggested that Mitchell had been prescriptive about her election coverage of environmental stories. The three tweets that were subject to debate were:

- 'It was absolutely excruciating. It was torture': Asa Wahlquist on departing The Australian after being stymied in covering #climate
- Wahlquist: ‘Chris Mitchell (Oz Ed) goes down the Eco-Fascist line’ on #climatechange.’ I left because I just couldn’t do it anymore"
- Wahlquist: ‘In the lead up to the election the Ed in Chief was increasingly telling me what to write.’ It was prescriptive.

The following day, Mitchell stated that he had been defamed by the tweet and was considering suing Posetti for the statements.

By 29 November, Mitchell's lawyers had sent a letter demanding an apology.

With a tape recording of the conference proceedings supporting Posetti's side of the story, a lawsuit increasingly seemed unwinnable.

Posetti's employer, the University of Canberra, expressed their support for Posetti and on 9 December, Posetti's lawyers replied refusing an apology and inviting Chris Mitchell to attend lectures on journalism at the University of Canberra.

Posetti's supporters also created a Facebook page to support her case.

Journalist Jonathan Holmes pointed out that the case was significant because "It's not every day that the editor of a newspaper threatens to sue a journalist simply for reporting a matter of public interest. To put it mildly, it's a somewhat counter-intuitive action for a newspaperman to take."

== Recognition ==
She has won multiple professional awards (including the 2017 Gold Award at the New York Radio Festival and journalism education and research honours (including a national award for teaching and learning excellence in 2007).
