= Åsa Wahlquist =

Australian journalist

- Born: Åsa Karin Wahlquist
- Education: University of Adelaide
- Occupation: Journalist

Åsa Wahlquist is an Australian journalist.

== Life and career ==
In her early years Wahlquist worked as a proofreader, and on the family vineyard, Botobolar, where she made their first wine in 1974. She obtained at degree in agricultural science from the University of Adelaide.

She has been writing and speaking on rural issues since 1984, focusing mainly on Australian climate and water issues. Wahlquist worked for the ABC Radio's Country Hour, ABC TV's Countrywide and Australian All Over. Then in the years 1991-95 she was the rural writer for The Sydney Morning Herald, and after that the rural writer for The Australian. As at 2022, she works as a freelance journalist.

With a long term interest in water issues, which began in 1991 when she reported on the 1000 km long bluegreen algal outbreak in the Darling River, in 2008 she released the book Thirsty Country: Options for Australia, exploring Australia's water systems and the potential impact of climate change.

In May 2003, she reported on the first meeting of the Wentworth Group of Concerned Scientists and its founder, the Australian water scientist Peter Cullen, highlighting "the political impact of his ability to translate the complex details of science into the language of politics".

In 2015, her children's book Snails Bay Sabot Sailing Club, 1962-1973: A Sailing Club for Children in Balmain was published.

== #Twitdef defamation case ==
In what came to be known as the #Twitdef defamation case, an academic Julie Posetti posted tweets purporting to summarise sentiments expressed by Wahlquist in a speech given at a Journalism Education Conference in Sydney in November 2010.

In summary, Wahlquist was speaking on the issues she faced on election coverage of environmental issues. The speech was attended by Posetti, whose tweets on Twitter suggested Wahlquist found the editorial direction of The Australian's editor-in-chief Chris Mitchell "prescriptive" and stifling. Mitchell threatened Posetti with defamation as a result, indicating after audio recordings of Wahlquist's speech surfaced that Australian law does not protect individuals who are "repeating accurately allegations falsely made".

The issue of whether the reporting is accurate remains itself in some dispute. While some press found the transcripts supported Posetti's tweets, Jonathan Holmes of Media Watch stated that part of "what Posetti tweeted was wrong". He added that while "[t]he essence of what Wahlquist had to say was summarised fairly enough...in a defamation case in Australia, near enough isn't necessarily good enough."

== Awards ==
In 1996, Wahlquist won a Walkley Award for a three part series called The Gutting of NSW, published in the Australian rural newspaper The Land. In 2005 she won the Peter Hunt Eureka Prize for Environmental Journalism; in 1993 the European Community Journalist Award, and in several other years Dalgety Awards and McKell awards for rural journalism.

== Personal life ==
Åsa Wahlquist was born Åsa Karin Wahlquist.

Also known as Karin, she is one of the children of Gilbert ("Gil") Wahquist (1927–2012), an Australian journalist and "pioneer organic wine producer", and his wife, Vincie (née Porter), a school teacher. Her parents established the Botobolar vineyard and winery in Mudgee in 1971. Åsa's niece, Calla Wahlquist, is a well-known Australian journalist at The Guardian.
