= Tumbarumba wine region =

Wine region in New South Wales, Australia

Tumbarumba
- Wine region
- Type: Australian Geographical Indication
- Year established: 1998
- Country: Australia
- Part of: Southern New South Wales Zone
- Location: 35°36′S 148°0′E
- Climate region: Maritime
- Heat units: 1010
- Precipitation (annual average): 375 millimetres (14.8 in)
- Size of planted vineyards: 250 hectares (620 acres) (2012)
- Varietals produced: Chardonnay and Pinot Noir

Tumbarumba is a wine region in New South Wales, Australia. It is part of the Southern New South Wales zone and was entered in the Register of Protected Names on 10 December 1998. It surrounds the town of Tumbarumba and is on the western foothills of the Snowy Mountains. The elevation in the region ranges from 300 metres (980 ft) in the west to 800 metres (2,600 ft) in the east.

Tumbarumba has plantings of about 250 hectares (620 acres) roughly evenly split between white and red varieties. The dominant white variety is chardonnay and the dominant red variety is pinot noir. Between them, they are about 80% of total plantings.

The first vineyards were planted in 1982. It is now known for producing sparkling wines as well as cool-climate table wines, as it is the coolest climate grape-growing region in New South Wales.

Much of the grape crop from the region is sold to major wine companies with production facilities outside of the area. There are also a few local wine producers.
