= Pokolbin, New South Wales =

Pokolbin
- Suburb
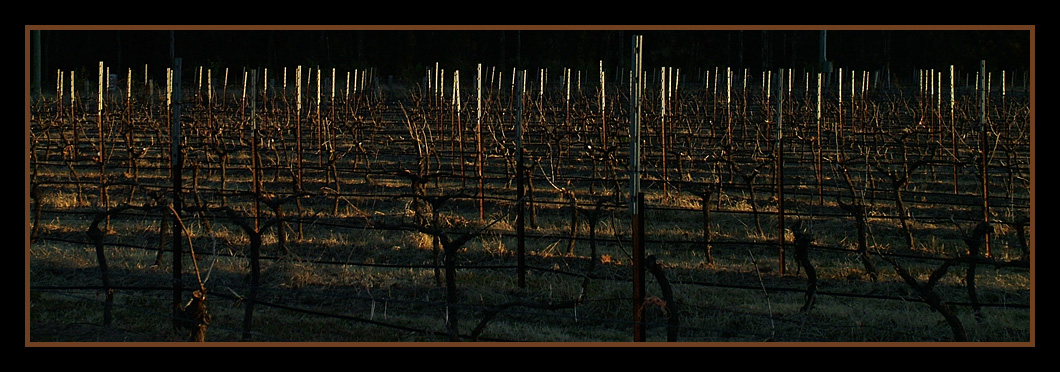
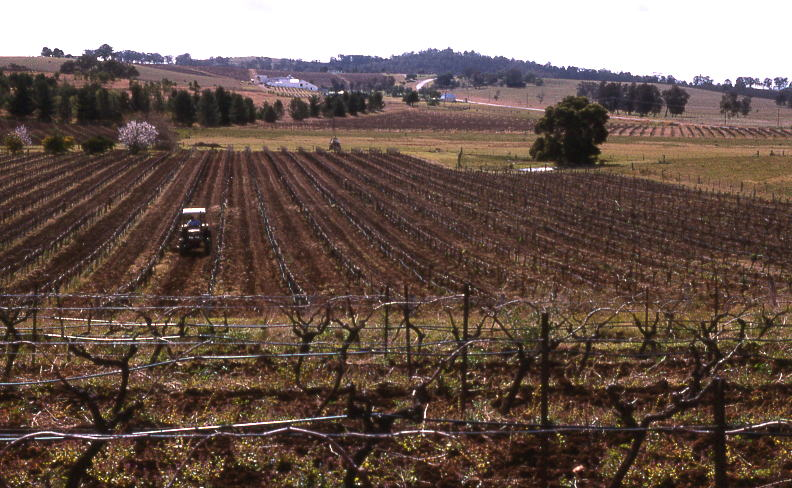
- Sunset over a Pokolbin vineyard Pokolbin vineyard

- Coordinates: 32°47′54″S 151°17′4″E
- Country: Australia
- State: New South Wales
- Region: Hunter
- City: Cessnock
- LGAs: City of Cessnock; Singleton Council
- Location: 163 km (101 mi) N of Sydney; 11.7 km (7.3 mi) WNW of Cessnock; 64 km (40 mi) W of Newcastle
- Established: 1800s

Government
  - State electorate: Cessnock
  - Federal division: Hunter

Population
  - Total: 1,049 (SAL 2021)
  - Density: ^{Note2}
- Time zone: UTC+10 (AEST)
  - Summer (DST): UTC+11 (AEDT)
- Postcode: 2320
- County: Northumberland
- Parish: Pokolbin
- Mean max temp: 30 °C (86 °F)
- Mean min temp: 3.8 °C (38.8 °F)
- Annual rainfall: 699.1 mm (27.52 in)
Suburbs around Pokolbin
Singleton Military Area	Rothbury	Rothbury
Singleton Military Area, Broke	Pokolbin	Nukalba
Broke	Mount View	Cessnock

Pokolbin /pəˈkoʊlbɪn/ is a rural locality in the Hunter Region of New South Wales Australia. It is part of the Singleton Council local government area and the city of Cessnock. The area is the centre of the Lower Hunter Valley wine region. Pokolbin lies within the Hunter Valley Important Bird Area.

== History ==
The Darkinjung people (specifically the Wonarua tribe) originally inhabited the Cessnock area, including Pokolbin, for more than 3000 years. They were the major inhabitants at the time of European contact. This contact was disastrous for the Darkinjung people. Many were murdered or died as a result of European diseases. Others were forced onto neighbouring tribal territory and killed. Many lost the will to live and occupied shanty ghettos on the edge of white settlements. Settler pressure on land also constricted traditional tribal and clannish domains, often leading to tribal fighting.

Viticulture in the Hunter Valley is often considered to have commenced with James Busby. In the 1820s he studied oenology, wrote a treatise and guidance manual on the subject and briefly taught viticulture at a Liverpool farm school. In 1831 he undertook a tour of French and Spanish vineyards which resulted in two published journals of the trip. He returned with 570 cuttings of which 363 survived carefully wrapped in moss, sand and soil. Half went to the newly established Royal Botanical Gardens in Sydney. The rest he took with him to the family estate of Kirkton, just north of Belford on the Hunter river run by his brother-in-law William Kelman. Also in 1828 George Wyndam planted vines at his Dalwood estate with the first shiraz being planted there in 1830. The Drayton family established a vineyard at Pokolbin around the late 1850s and the Tyrrells Estate was set up in 1859 with Frederick Wilkinson planting vines at Oakdale in 1866. After the Robertson Land Act was introduced in 1861 the way was opened for small landholders and more people began to settle in the Rothbury/Pokolbin area. The main farming activities were wheat, tobacco, dairy and grapes. By the 1930s the area was known for producing quality wines.

== Wine ==
Pokolbin is surrounded by the Pokolbin subregion of the Hunter wine region, which includes numerous wineries, ranging from large multi-national to small family run operations, many of which are popular tourist destinations.

== Tourism ==
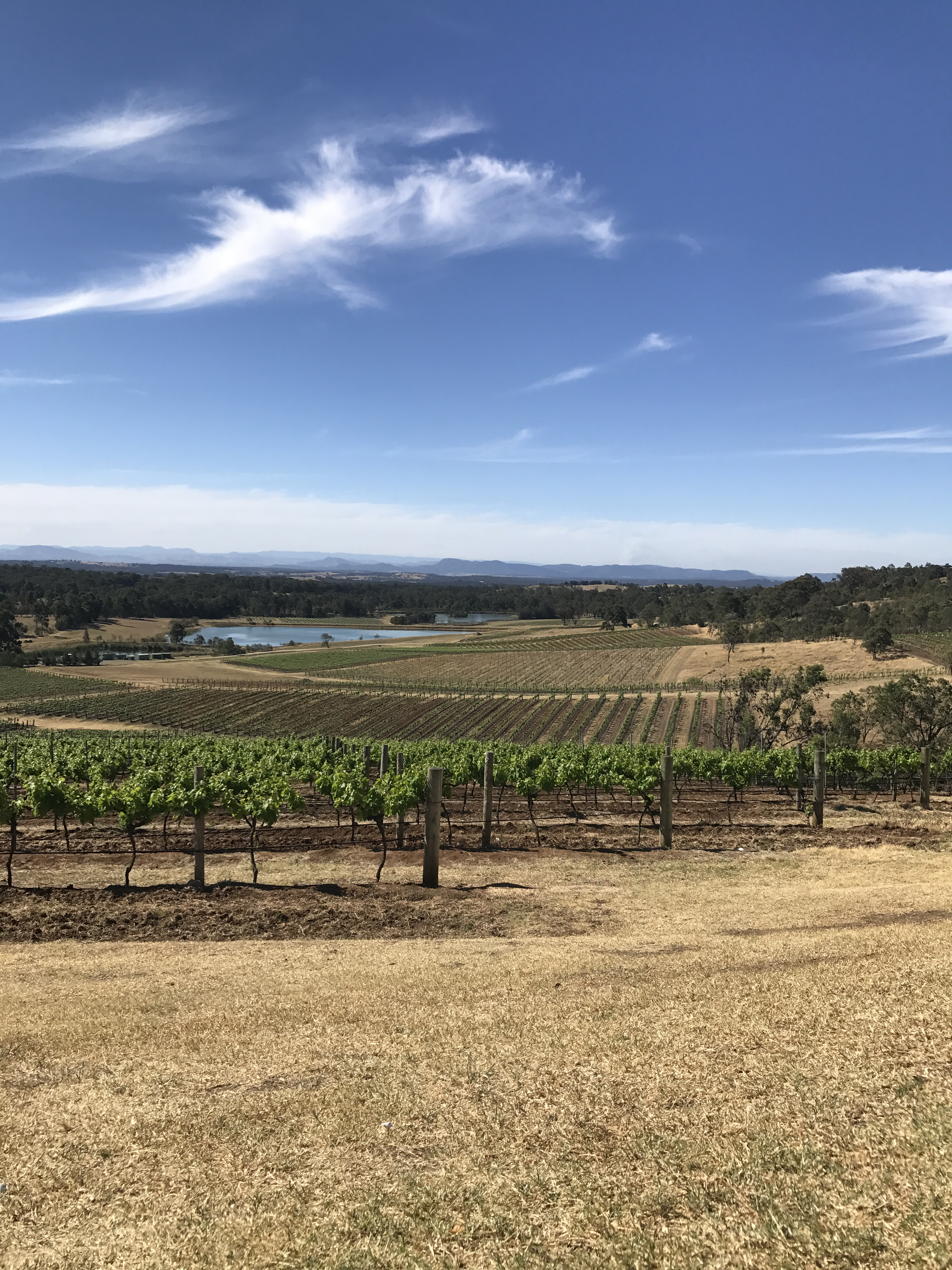
A vineyard in Pokolbin

Tourist accommodation in the area is plentiful due to the wine industry and Pokolbin's proximity to Sydney, which is 163 km (101 mi) to the south, reached via the Pacific Motorway. Accommodation includes country resorts, golfing resorts, motels and guest houses and hostels. There are many local restaurants where visitors can try local wines.

=== Attractions ===
Attractions in the Pokolbin area include numerous wineries and Pokolbin village. The Hunter Valley Gardens span over 25 hectares (62 acres) of land in the heart of the Hunter vineyards at the foot of the Brokenback Range, west of Cessnock. Potters Brewery, established in 2002, is the Hunter's first microbrewery located in the heritage listed "Brick Beehive Kilns of Nulkaba". The Great North Walk, a long-distance walking trail between Sydney and Newcastle, has an extension that goes to Pokolbin.
