= Hunter Valley wine region =

Wine region in Australia

Hunter Valley
- Wine region
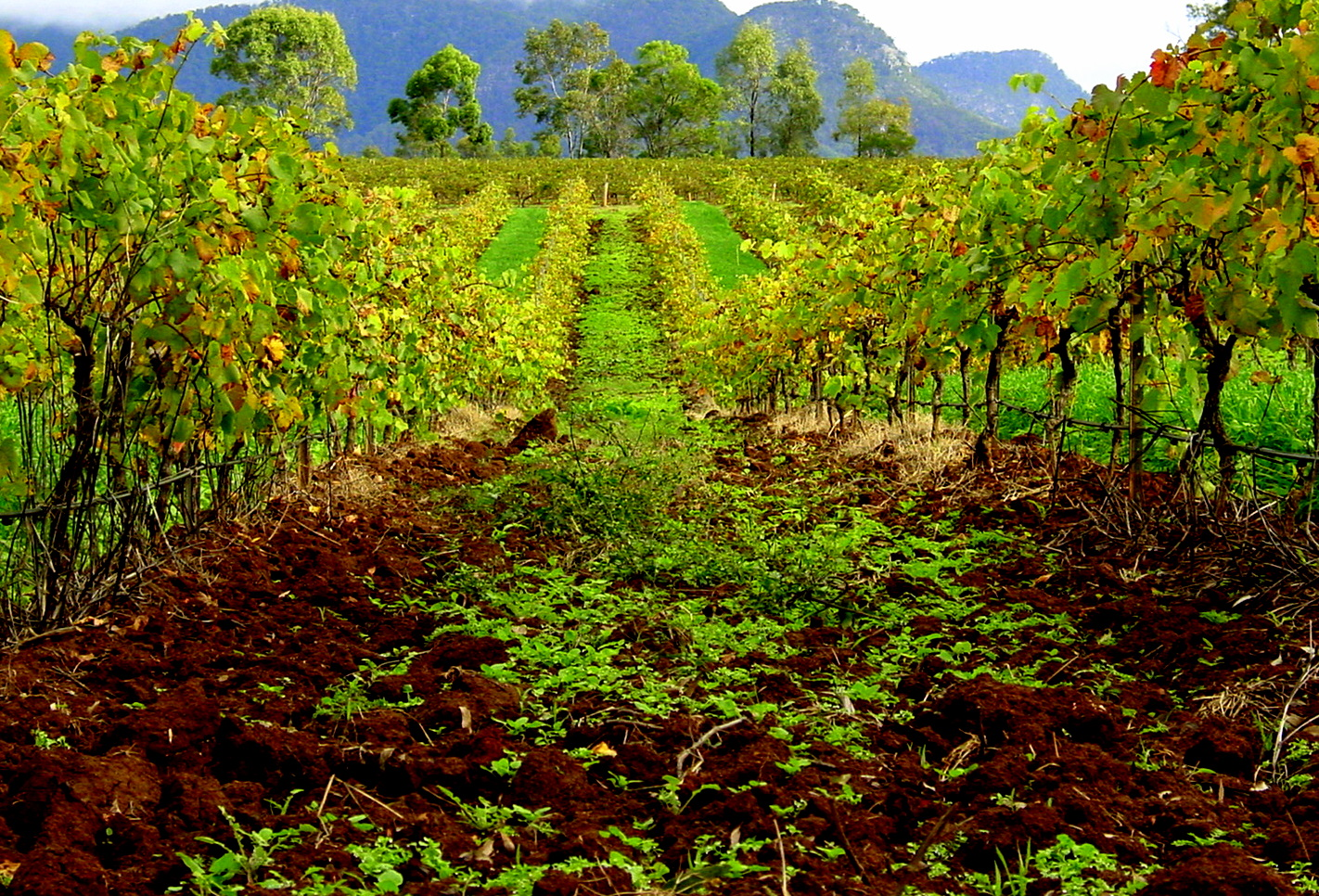
- A Hunter Valley vineyard
- Official name: Hunter
- Country: Australia
- Part of: Hunter Valley
- Sub-regions: Pokolbin, Broke Fordwich, Upper Hunter Valley
- Location: 32°46′57″S 151°17′51″E
- Climate region: Ib
- Heat units: 2070–2170
- Varietals produced: Semillon, Shiraz, Chardonnay, Cabernet Sauvignon, Verdelho

The Hunter Valley is one of Australia's wine regions. Located in the state of New South Wales and first cultivated in the early 19th century, it was one of the first Australian wine regions. As well as Hunter Valley Sémillon, the region produces wine from a variety of grapes including Shiraz, Chardonnay, Cabernet Sauvignon and Verdelho.

Under Australia's wine appellation system, the Hunter Valley zone Australian Geographical Indication (GI) covers the entire catchment of the Hunter River and its tributaries. Within that, the Hunter region is almost as large, and includes most of the wine-producing areas, excluding the metropolitan area of Newcastle and nearby coastal areas, some national parks, and any land that was in the Mudgee Shire (at the western heights of the catchment). There are three named subregions in the Hunter region. These are the Upper Hunter Valley, Broke Fordwich and Pokolbin subregions. The Lower Hunter Valley is not strictly defined, but in general includes the Pokolbin subregion, along with the districts around Wollombi, Mount View, Cessnock and Lovedale. Much of the history of Hunter was played out in this area and it is generally what is referred as the Hunter Valley "wine country".

The majority of the Hunter Valley's most prestigious vineyards are located on the southern valley and foothills of the Brokenback Range (part of the Great Dividing Range). The topography of the Hunter includes mostly gently sloping hills with modest gradients. The one notable exception are the vineyards of Mount View just west of the town of Cessnock. The terrain of the Upper Hunter is noticeably flatter as the Goulburn River and other tributaries of the Hunter River dominate the area. The greater river system of the Hunter, which includes the Goulburn and important tributaries such as Giants Creek, do provide needed irrigation for areas such as the Upper Hunter that can be prone to drought condition.

The success of the Hunter Valley wine industry has been dominated by its proximity to Sydney with its settlement and plantings in the 19th century fuelled by the trade network that linked the valley to the city. The steady demand of consumers from Sydney continues to drive much of the Hunter Valley wine industry, including a factor in the economy by the tourism industry.

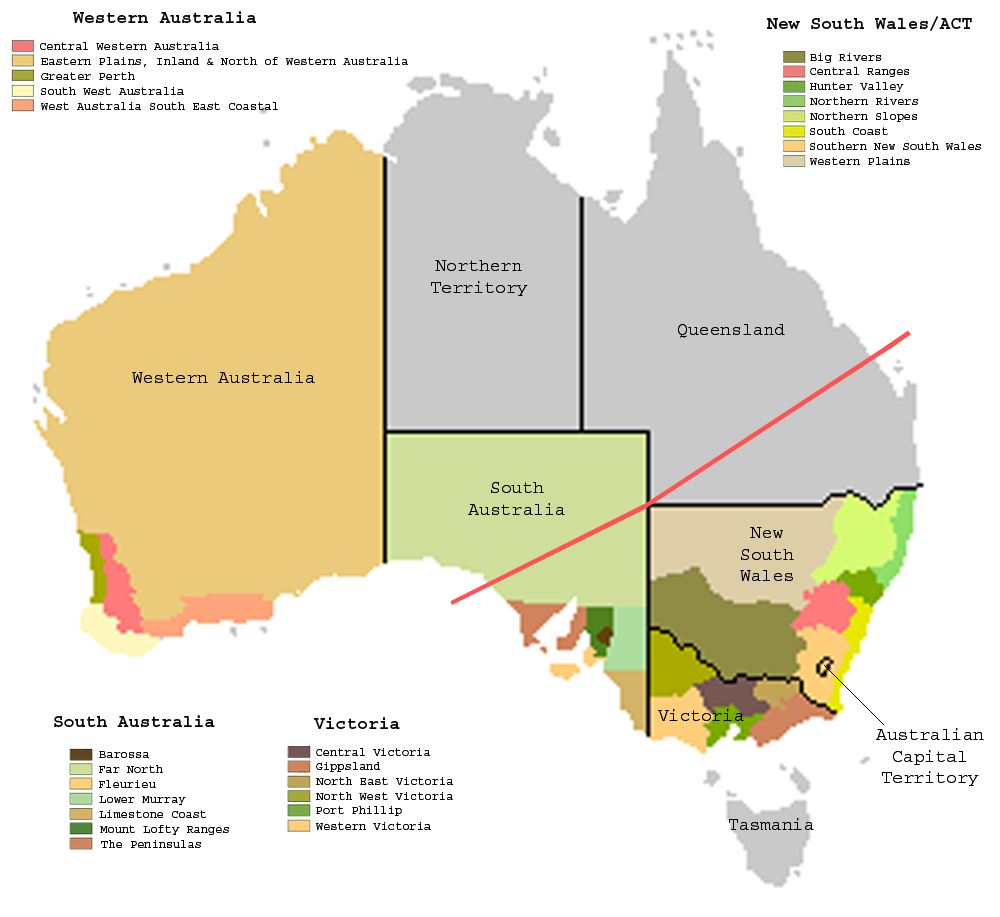
Wine zones of Australia. Hunter Valley is the dark green near the east coast.

== History ==
The wine-making history of Hunter Valley begins with the European settlement of the Sydney and the New South Wales region of Australia in the late 18th century as a penal colony of the British Empire. The Hunter River itself was discovered, by accident, in 1797 by British Lieutenant John Shortland as he searched for escaped convicts. The region soon became a valuable source for timber and coal that fuelled the steamship trade coming out of Sydney.

Grapevines were planted in Sydney soon after its discovery in 1788 and as settlements fanned northward up towards the Hunter, government authorities actively encouraged plantings as a means of promoting both public sobriety and safety. The logic behind the promotion of viticulture and winemaking was that men tend to become more drunk and disorderly when under the influence of highly alcoholic spirits. If enough wine was provided, it was believed, it could be a moderate influence that could tame the "savagery".

It was under these auspices that the grapevine followed land prospector John Howe as he cut a path through the Australian wilderness from Sydney up to the overland area in what is now known as the (Lower) Hunter Valley proper in 1820. Today, the modern Putty Road between the cities of Windsor and Singleton follows Howe's exact path and is a major thoroughfare for wine tourists coming into the Hunter Valley from Sydney. As previous plantings in the coastal areas around Sydney succumbed to the humidity and wetness, and plantings to the west were limited by spring frost damage, northern reaches leading to the Hunter became, almost by default, the wine region of the new colony.

Thomas Melville White Winder is credited with planting the first grapes in the region on arriving 1820 to the Hunter. He built Windermere, the historic house in 1821 which was on the hunter and had a fleet of ships which sent Cedar timber and other supplies south to Sydney and overseas. He planted a vineyard on the estate prior to 1840.

=== James Busby and further plantings ===
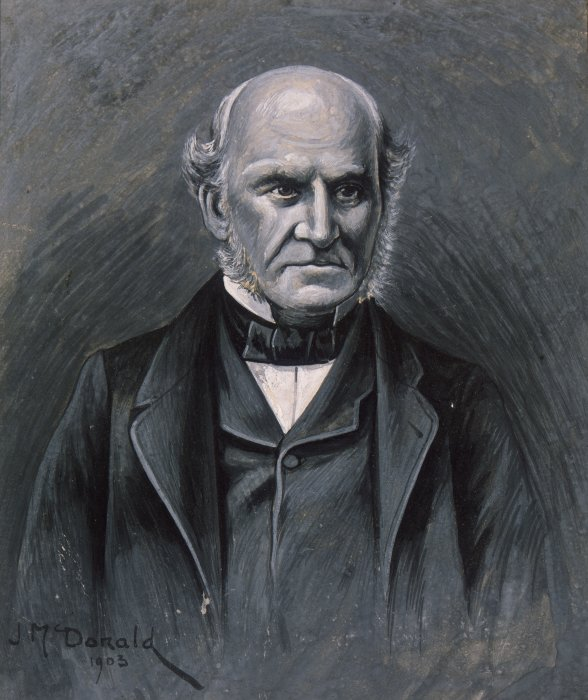
James Busby brought to the Hunter Valley plantings from Europe and South Africa.

The first major planting in the Hunter Valley came in 1825 when James Busby, widely considered the father of Australian wine, purchased vineyard land between the settlements of Branxton and Singleton and named it Kirkton after his Scottish birthplace near Edinburgh. In 1831, Busby travelled extensively throughout Europe and South Africa, collected cuttings from over 500 vineyards, including six cuttings of Syrah from the Hermitage hill in the Rhône. When he returned, many of these cuttings were planted in the Hunter Valley at the Kirkton estate now owned by his brother-in-law William Kelman.

In the 1830s, several vineyards were planted in the Hunter Valley, including the first vineyards by George Wyndham of Wyndham Estate, many with cuttings directly provided by Busby at Kirkton. In 1847, the Hunter Valley Viticulture Society was founded with the mission of expanding viticultural knowledge and improving techniques in the region. By the end of the decade, plantings had expanded from 80 ha (198 acres) to over 200 ha (494 acres). Between 1866 and 1876 the region saw further expansion as the acreage of planted vines topped 1800.

Most of the early vineyards of the Hunter were located in the northeast section of the valley in the fertile alluvial plains along the Hunter River. The river provided easy transport of the wine down to the seaside port of Newcastle and onto Sydney. By the 1860s, plantings began to move further south and west towards the foothills of the Brokenback range near Pokolbin and Rothbury where many of the most highly esteemed vineyards of the Hunter are now found.

=== Mid-19th century to early 20th century ===
In the mid 19th century, wines from the Hunter Valley began to garner international acclaim. In 1855, at the Paris Exhibition (notable in wine history for the unveiling of the Bordeaux Wine Official Classification), Hunter Valley wines won numerous awards from tasting panel judges. In the official report for the exhibition, the judges wrote "The [Hunter Valley's] wines included white wine akin to those of the Rhone; red light wines like those of Burgundy; Mousseux varieties with a bouquet, body and flavor equal to the first Champagnes; Muscat and other sweet wines, rivaling the Montignac of the Cape." A Hunter Valley sparkling wine made from James King of Irrawang Vineyard bested the French Champagnes to win the honour of being served at the table of Emperor Napoleon III during the exhibition's closing ceremonies.

The expansive growth of the Hunter Valley in the mid to late 19th century came directly from its monopoly position of the lucrative Sydney market. The provincial government of New South Wales had enacted regulations that placed prohibitive duties on wines from other areas such as Victoria and South Australia. This had the effect of limiting any competition for Hunter Valley winemakers in Sydney. But the turn of the 20th century brought a shifting dynamic to the Hunter Valley wine industry as the provinces on the Australian continent became federated into states and a new constitution was drafted that banned such interstate trade barriers. The opening of the Sydney market to the flux of out of state wine, as well as the changing public tastes from dry wines to sweet, fortified ports, muscats and sherry signalled a period of steep decline for the Hunter Valley.

Following World War I, many returning Australian veterans were given land grants in the Hunter Valley. This temporarily produced an up-tick in plantings but the global Great Depression as well as a series of devastating hail storms between 1929 and 1930 caused many growers to abandon their vineyards. Some of the land was bought up by the growing wine estates of Tyrrell, Elliotts and Wyndham that would later become driving forces behind the Hunter Valley's next boom period.

Another pivotal figure during this period was Maurice O'Shea of Mount Pleasant vines in the Pokolbin area. While many producers in Australia were focusing on fortified wine, O'Shea continued to espouse the virtue of Australian dry table wines. O'Shea's foresight would pay off as consumer taste shifted towards drier styles of wine in the 1950s and 1960s. A flurry of plantings began in the Hunter, including 1963 establishment of Lake's Folly by a Sydney surgeon, Dr. Max Lake. Along with Rudy Komon, Johnny Walker and wine columnist Len Evans, who all believed in the future of the Australian wine industry, Lake begin to extensively plant red wine varietals, including the reintroduction of Cabernet Sauvignon to the Hunter Valley.

=== 1960s to present-day ===
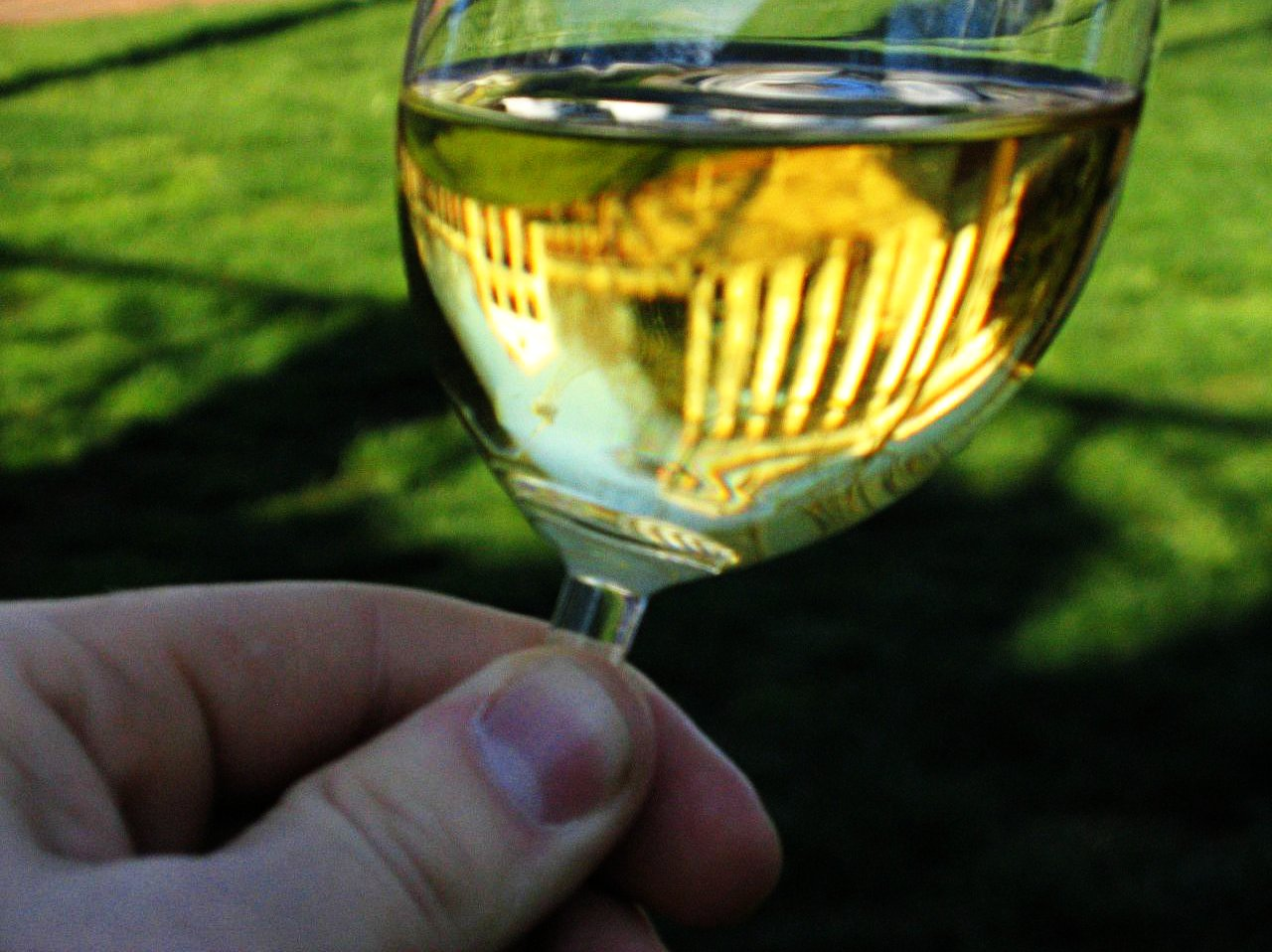
Chardonnay production in the Hunter Valley was a major part of the Australian wine boom of the 1990s.

In the 1960s, a Sydney wine merchant named Leo Buring began marketing the first commercially successful Hunter Valley Semillon under the label "Rhine Gold". In 1971, Murray Tyrrell released Australia's first commercial bottling of Chardonnay which signalled the beginning of the Australian Chardonnay craze. According to wine experts Hugh Johnson and Jancis Robinson, Tyrrell's Vat 47 Hunter Valley Chardonnay was the wine that "launched a million bottles." From 1956 to 1976, plantings in the Hunter Valley grew from 466 ha (1,150 acres) to over 4,100 ha (10,000 acres). Despite a slight reduction during the global recession of the 1980s, the Australian wine boom of the 1990s pushed plantings even further to over 4,600 ha (11,000 acres).

While the Hunter Valley has been supplanted by the massive Riverina wine region as the largest producer of New South Wales wine, it still accounts for around 3% of Australia's total wine production and is one of the country's most recognisable regions. Today there are over 150 wineries in the Hunter, producing a wide range of wine.

== Climate ==
While the Hunter Valley is usually grouped in with the rest of Australia as having a Mediterranean climate, the climate is actually humid subtropical, with distinctive maritime influences from the Pacific Ocean. With its northerly latitude and close oceanic influences, the Hunter Valley is one of Australia's hottest and wettest wine regions. Flanked by mountains to the west and north the Hunter Valley acts as a funnel, pulling cool ocean breezes into the area. This effect is similar to the cooling that Napa Valley receives from San Pablo Bay in California. Without these cooling breezes, quality wine grape production would be nearly impossible. However, with those cooling breezes also comes heavy rainfall and periodic cyclonic storms in the summer and autumn months.

In the summer, the average daily temperature regularly exceeds 21.1 °C (70.0 °F) while during the winter the temperature averages around 14 °C (57.2 °F). Through the growing year, January tends to be the warmest month while July is usually the coolest. Temperatures during the peak growing month of January average between 22.7–23.3 °C (72.9–73.9 °F), with the temperature becoming progressively hotter the further inland you move away from the cooling influence of the sea. During the growing season the Hunter Valley receives an average of 7.3–7.5 hours of sunshine a day, but with the cloud cover coming in off the ocean the sunlight is slightly diffuse which gives the vines some protection from heat stress. During the growing season the Lower Hunter will average around 2070 degree days (Celsius) with the Upper Hunter having 2170 degree days putting it under the Winkler heat summation scale as a Region IV.

Mid-latitude westerly winds bring high pressure weather front that alternate with cold fronts on the winter. This leads to generally drier conditions in the winter months of July and August. In the summer, southeasterly winds bring weather fronts harbouring extensive amounts of moisture. Between October and April more than two thirds of the region's annual rainfall will fall with January and February being the wettest months. As much as 400–530 mm (15.7–20.9 in) of rain can fall during harvest months, creating the Hunter's biggest viticultural hazard, though the inverse problem of winter drought can also be a problem. The rain, coupled with the heat, encourages high relative humidity in the region and subsequent threat of mould. During the growing season months of October–April, the 3pm average for relative humidity in the Lower Hunter is 49%, while it is 43% in the Upper Hunter.

== Wine regions and subregions ==
The Hunter Valley Wine Zone Australian Geographical Indication was registered on 1 May 1996 and is approximately the entire Hunter River catchment. It contains only one named wine region, Hunter. The Hunter Wine Region Australian Geographical Indication was declared on 18 March 1997. It is not as large as the Hunter Valley zone, but includes most of the significant vineyards. It does not extend east of the Pacific Highway. The Hunter region has three subregions.

The three recognised subregions of the Hunter Wine Region are Broke Fordwich (registered 2 September 1997), Pokolbin (registered 29 July 2010) and Upper Hunter Valley (registered 29 July 2010).

=== Broke Fordwich ===
Broke Fordwich
- Wine region
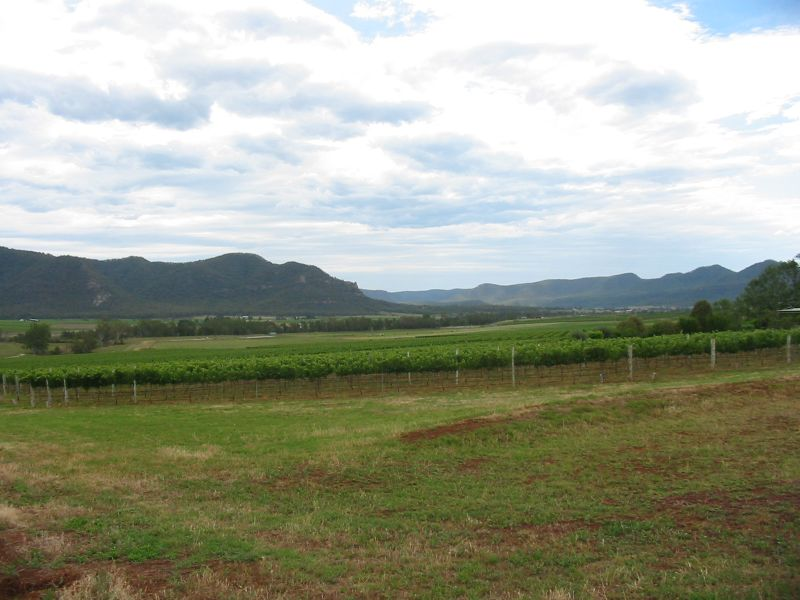
- Vineyards in the Broke Fordwich area
- Type: Australian Geographical Indication
- Year established: 1997
- Country: Australia
- No. of vineyards: 50
- Varietals produced: Semillon, Chardonnay, Shiraz
- No. of wineries: 16

Broke Fordwich surrounds the towns of Broke, Fordwich and Bulga.

Some of the oldest vines in the Hunter Valley were planted in 1924 around the village of Fordwich. The Broke Fordwich subregion is between the Upper Hunter Valley to the northwest and the lower Hunter Valley (including Pokolbin) to the east. Broke Fordwich is sheltered on the south side of the valley on the Fordwich Sill volcanic red clay and nearby free-draining alluvial soils and sandy loam. It has lower rainfall and higher diurnal temperature variation than Pokolbin.

The Broke Fordwich area is located along the Hunter River tributary of the Wollombi Brook near the suburb of Pokolbin. The area was founded in 1830 by Major Thomas Mitchell who named the region after his fellow Napoleonic War veteran Sir Charles Broke-Vere. The area's location along the convict trail helped it to flourish as convicts were shuttled through to work in the coal mines of Cessnock. In September 1997, it was granted official sub-region status of the Hunter Valley. For most of the Hunter Valley's history, Broke Fordwich was noted for the quality of its fruit. Max Lake, of Lake's Folly, noted in 1970 that "Much of the reputation of Pokolbin rests with fruit from Fordwich".

The Broke Fordwich subregion includes the communities of Broke, Bulga, Fordwich and Milbrodale. Many of the vineyards of the area are located on the undulating hills around the villages of Broke and Bulga leading up to the southwestern edge of the Brokenback range. The large Yellow Rock escarpment that border Broke also has numerous vineyards and is the regions dominant geographical feature. The area is one of the warmest in the Lower Hunter with some continental influences due to extenuating foothills of the Brokenback range that particularly encircle the area and block many of the breezes coming off the coast.

Broke Fordwich accounts for around 14% of all the Hunter Valley's plantings. More than three-quarters of the vineyard land in the area is dedicated to Chardonnay, Semillon, Verdelho, Shiraz, Pinot noir and Merlot. Other varieties grown in the area include Cabernet Sauvignon, Cabernet Franc, Chambourcin, Malbec, Traminer, Barbera, Trebbiano, Viognier, Sangiovese, Tempranillo and Dolcetto.

=== Pokolbin ===
Pokolbin
- Wine region
- Type: Australian Geographical Indication
- Year established: 2010
- Country: Australia
- Part of: Hunter Valley wine region

The Pokolbin subregion, which surrounds Pokolbin provides most of the grapes known as "Lower Hunter Valley". It covers an area including and west of the road between Cessnock and Branxton, but stops short of both of those places. The eastern boundary is Black Creek east of that road, and the western boundary is the Pokolbin State Forest.

The area includes numerous wineries, ranging from large multi-national to small family run operations, which are a popular tourist destination. In addition to long-established names like Drayton, Lindeman's, Tulloch, Lake's Folly and Tyrrell, newer plantings from the likes of Brokenwood Wines, Don Francois, Allandale, Petersons and Bimbadgen can be found. Much of the rolling countryside around Pokolbin is under vine with the traditional varieties Shiraz and Sémillon still dominating but extensive plantings of Chardonnay, Cabernet Sauvignon and the occasional plot of Pinot noir can be seen.

Despite hot summers and freezing winters with frequent frost presenting a constant challenge to vineyard managers and winemakers, the area is a successful wine growing region thanks to mountains that encircle three sides of the valley, the cloud cover, and afternoon easterly sea breezes which, during summer, help to mitigate the blazing sunshine and keep humidity moderated on the valley floor. Soil types vary from rich red volcanic soil from the long-extinct volcano of Mount View and sandy loam which benefits most white varieties. The red volcanic soil is found mostly on the southern ridges. However, it can be found in patches on the valley floor.

Over the decades, the style of Hunter whites and reds has changed vastly, from robust, muscular reds exhibiting the famous Hunter Valley "sweaty saddle" and extraordinarily long-lived Semillon whites to reds showing more fruit, complexity and delicacy and whites exhibiting fruit-driven characters.

=== Upper Hunter Valley ===
Upper Hunter Valley
- Wine region
- Type: Australian Geographical Indication
- Year established: 2010
- Country: Australia
- Location: 32.4°S 150.7°E
- Heat units: 2070
- Precipitation (annual average): 530 millimetres (21 in)

The main town in the Upper Hunter Valley subregion is Muswellbrook. The Upper Hunter Valley is the most northern and western subregion of the Hunter region, on higher slopes of the Hunter Valley.

The Upper Hunter region was first planted in 1860 by a German settler named Carl Brecht. From his vineyard planted at the junction of Wybong Creek and the Goulburn River, Brecht's wines would win numerous gold medals at international wine competitions in the 1870s. Brecht's success would spur some interest in the area but the same turn of the 20th century events that saw decline throughout the Hunter Valley would compound to virtually extinguish all viticulture in the Upper Hunter. It wasn't until the 1960s when Penfolds purchased land near Brecht's old Wybong estate that significant viticulture interest in the Upper Hunter re-emerged. Through many years of trial and error, the viticulturalists at Penfolds were able to determine that the area was most suitable for white wine grape varieties.

In comparison to the Lower Hunter, the Upper Hunter receives less overall rain (620 mm (24 in) annually to Lower Hunter's 720 mm (28 in)). As the vast majority of this rainfall takes place during the late summer and early autumn, irrigation is a necessity for many vineyards during the early growing season of the spring and summer. Being further inland, the Upper Hunter receives less maritime influence from the cooling sea breezes and has a much hotter heat summation with 2170 degree days (Celsius) to the 2070 degree days generally seen by the Lower Hunter.

Several small wineries operate in the region. The Upper Hunter has experienced a decline in vineyard area since the withdrawal of large wine producers Rosemount and Arrowfield from buying large quantities of Upper Hunter grapes early in the 21st century.

== Viticulture ==
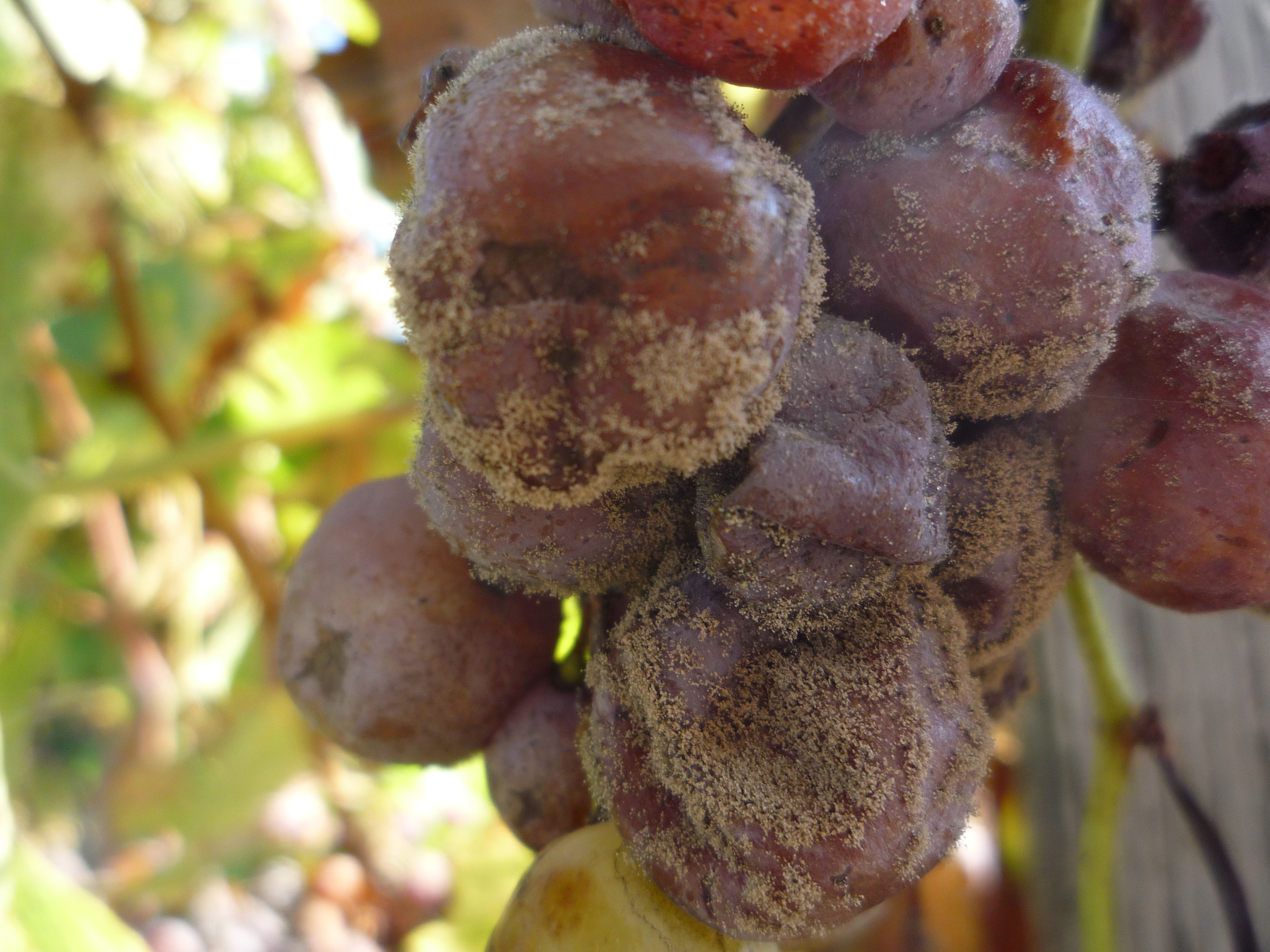
Thin-skinned grapes like Semillon are prone to developing various rots. Some, like Botrytis cinera (pictured), can be desirable and used to produce dessert wines known as "stickies".

Like most New World wine regions, there is little to no government restrictions on the type of viticultural practices used in the Hunter Valley. Growers are free to plant whatever grape variety they wish, use any pruning or vine training system, and harvest as large or small of yields as they wish. To that extent, there is a wide range of viticultural practices seen in the Hunter Valley, though some commonality does occur. As with many areas of Australia with labour shortages, viticulture in the Hunter is highly mechanised with machine harvesting the norm and experiments in mechanical pruning and leaf pulling also widely practised. Harvest usually takes place from mid-January to early March.

The high humidity and propensity for harvest rains leads many growers to use open canopy management techniques and trellising as well as frequent leaf pulling in order to keep mould and rot at bay. Some examples of vine training systems found in the Hunter including the Scott Henry, Smart-Dyson and V-Trellis. In the Upper Hunter, the Vertical Shoot Positioning (VSP) is often used in areas that have problem with sunburn. Despite the generally wet climate, irrigation is often used in the slightly drier Upper Hunter where the winter and early growing seasons are prone to drought.

=== Hazards ===
The chief viticultural hazard in the Hunter Valley is the threat posed by vintage season rains. Site selection on well drained soils are considered of vital importance and much effort is put into ensuring the canopy is open so air flow can help dry the grapes off. Of particular concern is bunch rot often caused by the fungus Botrytis cinerea. In the production of late harvest wines, such as Semillon, Botrytis can be desirable and is known as noble rot. But for other grape varieties, particularly red wine grapes, the fungus is unwelcome with its infection described as grey rot.

In the late 1990s, research in Hunter Valley vineyards discovered that a wide range of pathogens caused various occurrences of bunch rot in the vineyards. These other pathogens included Colletotrichum acutatum (ripe rot), Greeneria uvicola (bitter rot) and other fungi from the genera of Aspergillus, Penicillium and Alternaria. Susceptibility of certain wine grape varieties were found to increase as the grapes reached higher Brix sugar levels. Further research in the 2000s, showed that some of the open canopy techniques used to prevent Botrytis grey rot may actually promote the development of some of these other types of rot. Ripe rot, in particular, seemed to thrive at the higher ultraviolet B (280–320 nm) light exposure that open canopies allow. To compound the potential problem for Hunter Valley wine growers is that, as of 2010, there wasn't any fungicides registered for use for this disease.

==== Other concerns ====
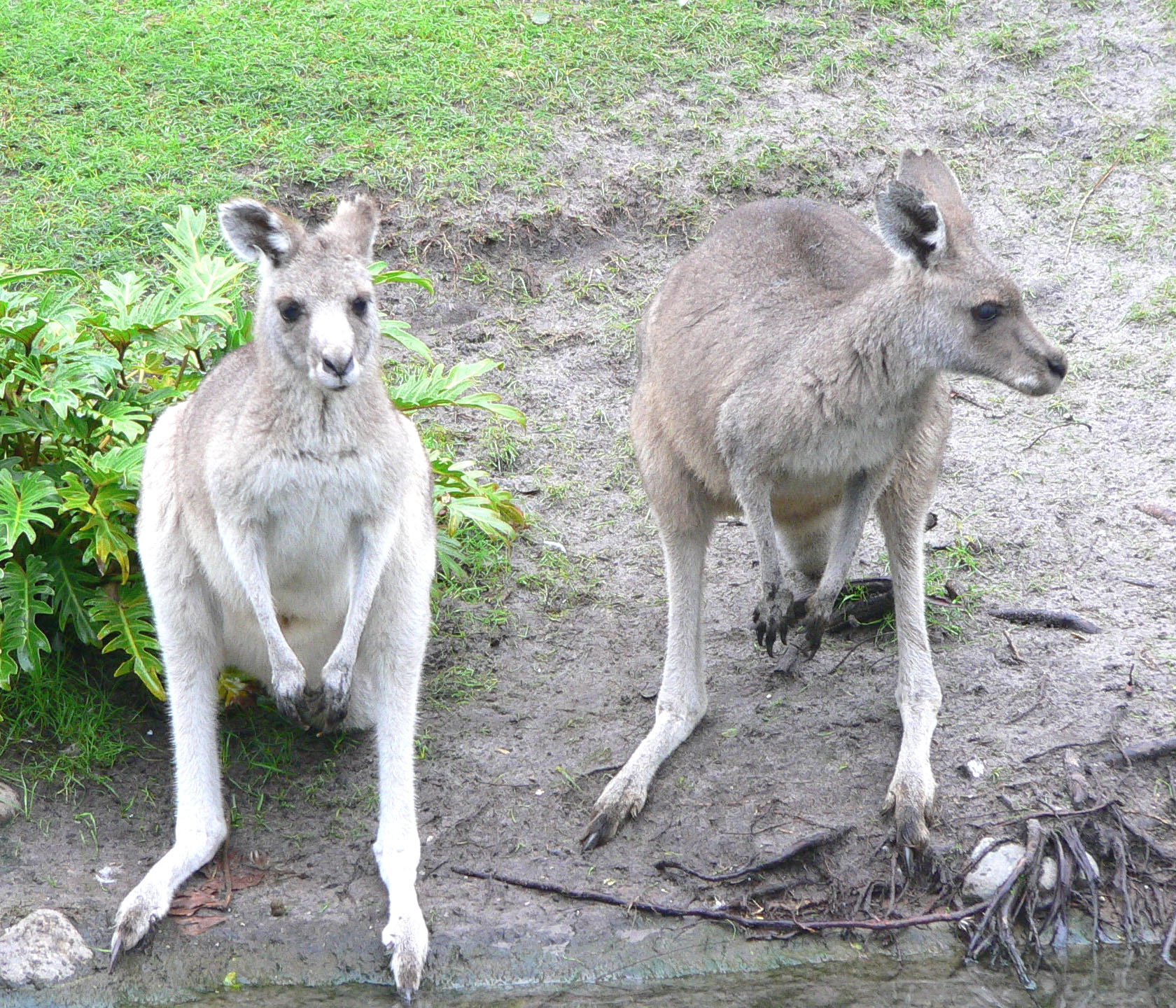
Kangaroos that like to feed on the tender buds and shoots of grapevines can be an occasional vineyard nuisance.

The unique environmental pressures of the Hunter Valley also conspire to give growers problem with "dieback diseases" that damage the wood parts of the vine and eventually lead to death. While the fungus Eutypa lata is present in the Hunter, research in the 2000s indicated that another pathogenic species related to Botryosphaeria is also present in the area. Semillon vines, in particular seem to be susceptible to Botryosphaeria (also known as bot canker) while, conversely, Eutypa dieback is rarely observed in the variety. Vines suffering from Eutypa die-back and bot canker exhibit similar wood symptoms and similarly experiences reduce growth and yields. A major difference between the two is that bot canker do not exhibit the same outward foliage symptoms that Eutypa die-back leave on the leaves and buds of the vine.

In addition to the pests noted above, vineyards in the Hunter Valley are usually grafted on phylloxera resistant rootstock to help keep the louse at bay. During the growing season kangaroos are frequent threats to the young buds and shoots of grapevines, requiring tall barb wire fences to keep the hopping creature out. Ever present nuisances near harvest time are the frequent birds that descend upon the area.

== Grape varieties ==
The most widely planted grape varieties in the Hunter Valley, in descending order, are Chardonnay, Semillon and Verdelho among the whites and Shiraz, Cabernet Sauvignon and Merlot among the reds. Prior to the late 1960s, there was very little Chardonnay found in Australia. In the Hunter Valley Penfolds has a small experimental planting. According to Murray Tyrrell of Tyrrell Vineyards, one night he jumped the barb wire fence of Penfolds and pruned a couple cuttings from Penfolds' vine and planted them in his vineyard. Whether or not that story is true is hard to prove but Tyrrell's 1971 Vat 47 Chardonnay is widely credited with ushering in the Australian Chardonnay craze of the late 20th century. Today in the Upper Hunter Valley, Chardonnay account for more than 70% of the areas planted and is sometimes blended with Semillon. Hunter Valley Chardonnay is characterised by its rich, oaky flavours with peaches and cream notes.

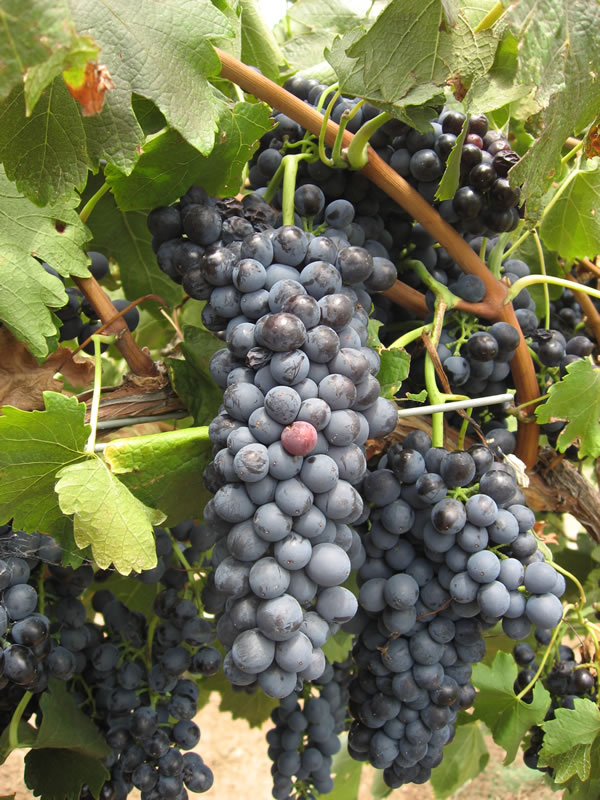
Shiraz grapes growing in the Hunter.

James Busby's collection is the likely origin of Hunter Valley Shiraz and today the Hunter Valley is home to some of the oldest own rooted Shiraz vine in the world with some vineyards boasting vines that are in excess of 120 years of age. Hunter Valley Shiraz is characterised but its astringent, gamy noted but has a tendency to develop in the bottle over 20 to 30 years into a silky, texture earthy wine with notes reminiscent of a Rhone. Traditionally Hunter Shiraz has carried the descriptor of "sweaty saddle". While this was once thought to be a terroir characteristic of the areas volcanic soils, it is now known to be caused by ethyl-4-phenol that comes from the exposure of the wine to certain strains of yeast in the Brettanomyces family.

While there were likely some plantings of Cabernet Sauvignon in the 19th century, Hunter Valley Cabernet seemed to vanish at the turn of the 20th century and didn't regain a footing in the Hunter until Max Lake reintroduced the variety along with the other Bordeaux varietals of Petite Verdot and Malbec in 1963. Today, Hunter Valley Cabernet exhibits more the regional traits of a Hunter Shiraz than it does with the varietal expression of Cabernet exhibited in Bordeaux and California. It tends to be very earthy and is usually cross blended with wine from regions outside the Hunter.

Maurice O'Shea of Mountain View pioneered planting of Pinot noir which he used to blend with Shiraz. The Pinot noir grown in the warm Region IV climate of the Hunter exhibits very little varietal similarities with the Pinot noirs of Burgundy and Oregon where it tends to produce a low acid, fruity wine. While an obscure grape mostly associated with the fortified wines of Madeira, Verdelho has developed a niche in the Hunter Valley where its thick skin and high acids tolerate the humidity and heat.

=== Semillon ===
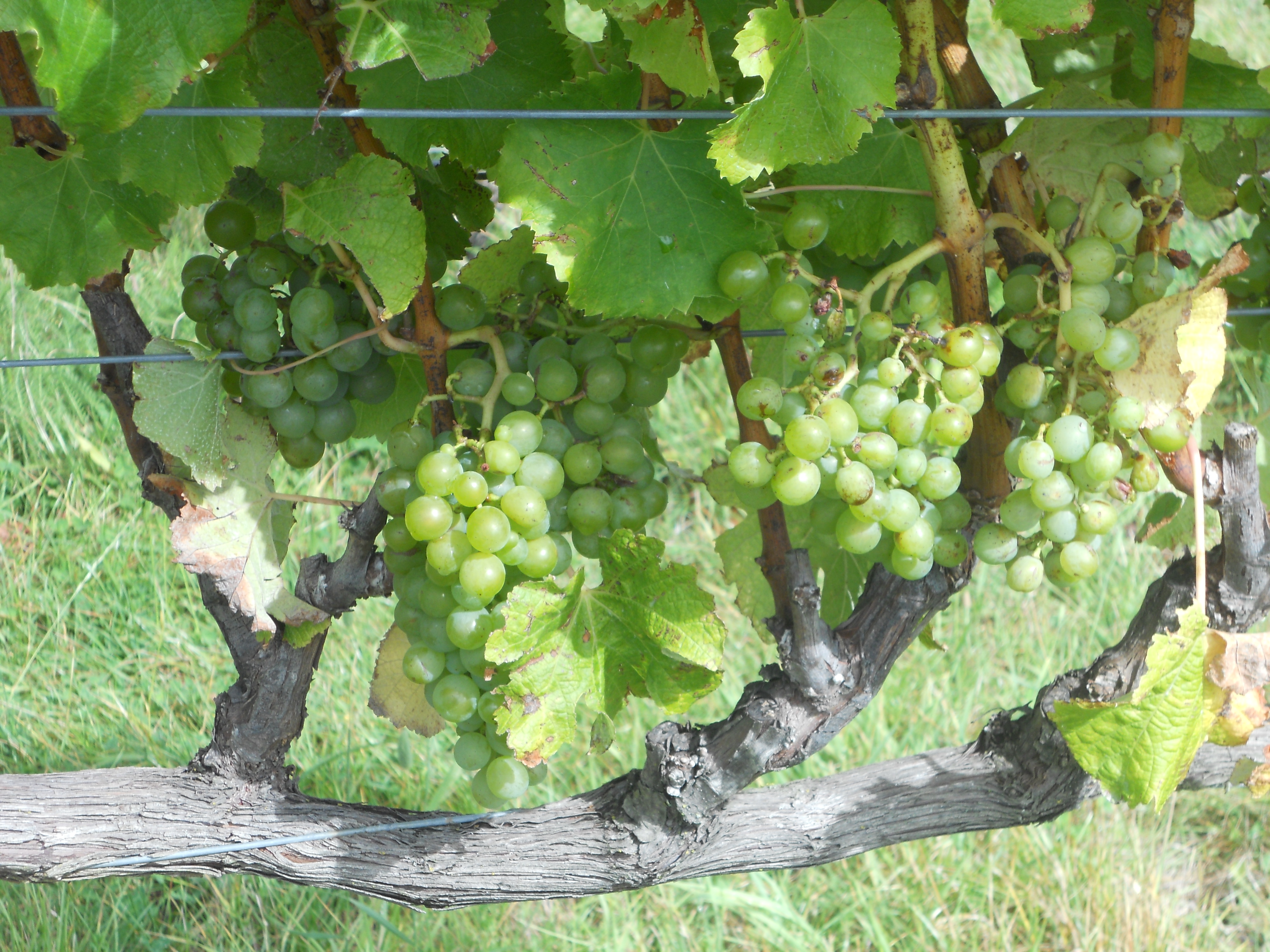
Semillon.

Hunter Valley Semillon is widely considered the iconic wine of the region. First planted in the region in 1830, the grape has been produced and variously labelled as Hunter Valley Riesling, Shepherd's Riesling, Hock, Rhine Gold, White Burgundy and Chablis. In its youth it is exhibits austere lemon, grassy notes but with 10 plus years in the bottle it develop into a rich, minerally wine with biscuit notes. The character of the wine changes so much that it often even fools professional tasters of being an oak aged Chardonnay that has gone through malolactic fermentation, this despite the fact that it likely hasn't seen a touch of oak or lactic acid bacteria. In the Upper Hunter there has been some experimentation with oaked aged Semillon but remained more the exception rather than the norm.

Described by Oz Clarke as one of the "wine world's enigmas", the grapes unique profile is attributed to the harsh climate and humidity of the Hunter which coax this low acid grape to higher acid levels than it achieves in the cooler climate of Bordeaux. Typical harvest figures for Hunter Valley Semillon are between 6.8 and 7.4 g/L acidity and 2.8-3 pH while in Bordeaux the grape is usually harvested at around 4.8–5.5 g/L and 3.1–3.3 pH.

It is the unique climate that shapes the Hunter Valley's distinctive Semillon. While the textbook profile of Semillon is that of a thin skin, neutral grape that is prone to low acids and fatness in the Hunter it matures over decades into a honeyed wine with toasty biscuit notes and a mineral backbone. Despite almost always being unoaked, a mature Semillon gives the textural impression of spending years in the barrel.

== Soils ==
Overall, the Hunter Valley has more soils (mostly hard, acidic patches of poorly draining heavy clay) that are unsuitable for viticulture than they have areas that are ideal for growing grapes. The soils of the Lower Hunter vary widely from sandy alluvial flats (often planted to Semillon), to deep friable loam (often planted with Shiraz) and friable red duplex soils. In the Upper Hunter, the rivers and creeks of the region contribute to the areas black, silty loam soils that are often overlaid on top of alkaline clay loam. Among the hills of the Brokenback range are strips of volcanic basalt that are prized by growers for their tendencies to restrict vigor and concentrate mineral flavours in the grapes.

== Wine industry ==
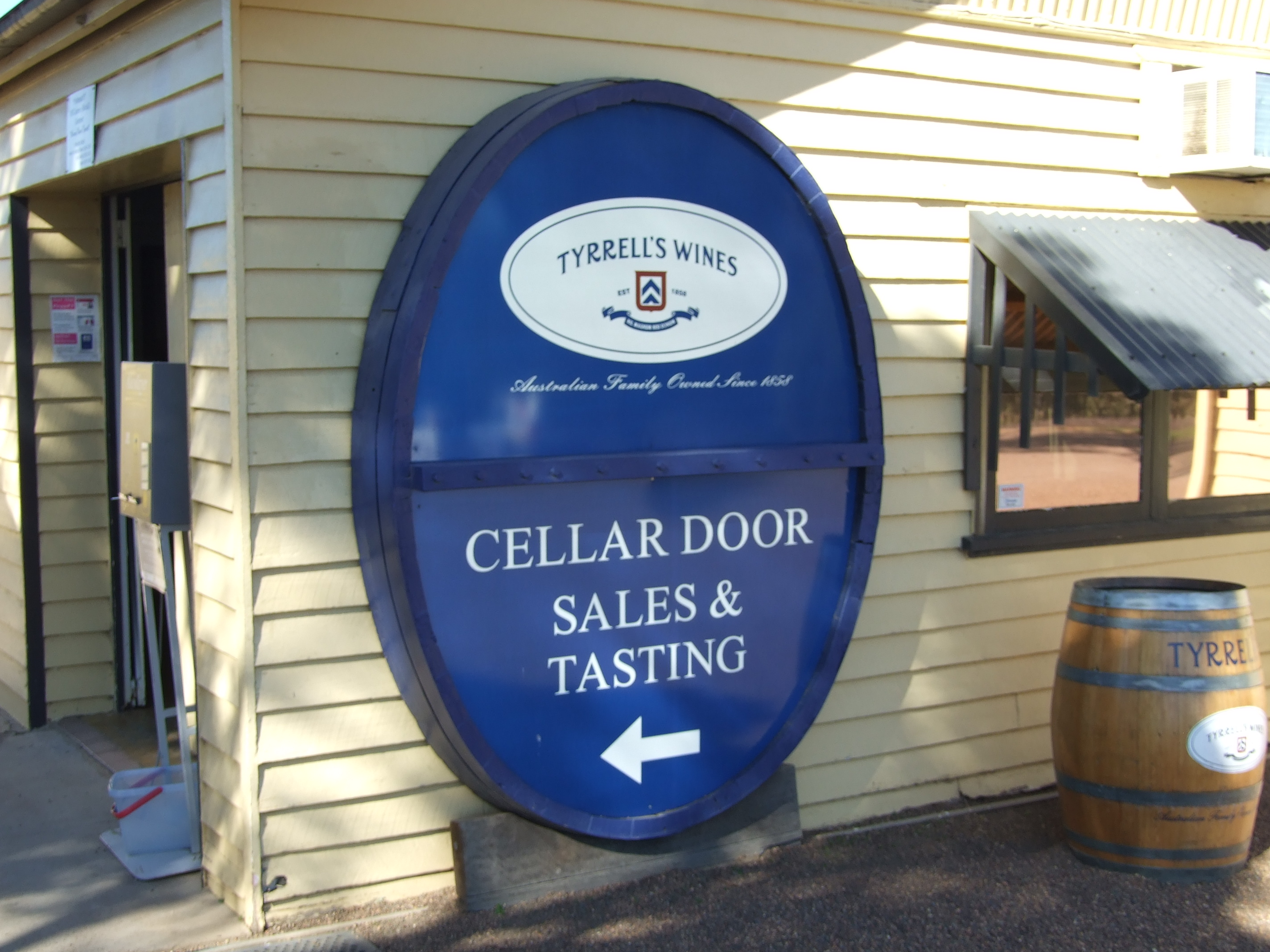
A cellar door sign for a winery in the Hunter.

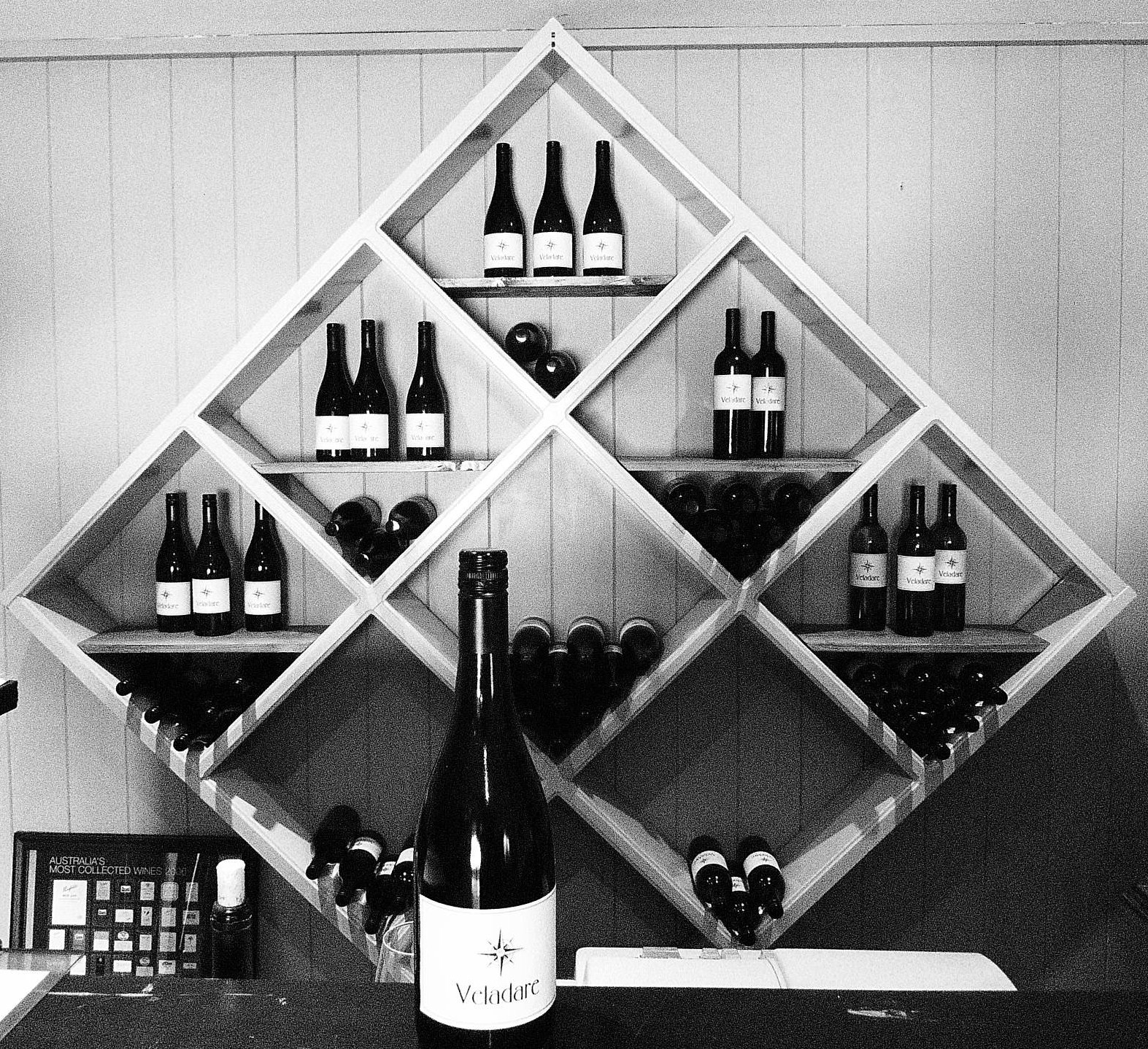
A cellar door at a winery in the Hunter.

The Hunter Valley wine industry is dominated by its proximity to Sydney. It has also become a significant element in the local economy in the tourism industry. The significance of tourism can be exemplified by the employment of more people in that industry than wine production. In 2008, a total of 4,469 ha (11,043 acres) of wine grapes were planted in the Hunter Valley with 1,687 ha (4,169 acres) dedicated to red grapes and 2,782 ha (6,874 acres) planted to white grapes. At harvest time, 9,263 tonnes of red wine varieties were crushed for an average of 5.5 tonnes/ha. Among white wine varieties, 19,310 tonnes were crushed with an average of 6.9 tonnes/ha. Around 28% of the red grapes and 63% of the white grapes crushed were from estate grown-fruit. Roughly a third of the red grapes and a fifth of the white grapes crushed were imported from outside the Hunter Valley. Many of these imported grapes come from other New South Wales Wine regions such as the Cowra, Mudgee, Orange and Riverina and are labelled under the large Southeast Australia designation.

The wine laws for the Hunter Valley follow the same regulations as the rest of Australia, as governed by Wine Australia. For a grape variety to appear on the wine label as a varietal wine it must account for at least 85% of the wine. If the wine is a multi-grape blend it must list the grapes on the wine in order of importance with the exact percentages of each grape listed somewhere on the wine. If the wine is labelled with a region then at least 85% of the grapes must be sourced from that area.
