= Central Ranges wine region =

Central Ranges
- Wine region
- Year established: 1996
- Country: Australia
- Part of: New South Wales
- Sub-regions: Cowra, Mudgee, Orange
- Location: 33°S 149.4°E

Central Ranges is a wine zone and Australian geographical indication in the Central West of New South Wales. It lies on the western slopes of the Great Dividing Range, west of the Blue Mountains.

The Central Ranges zone contains three wine regions. From north to south, they are Mudgee, Orange, and Cowra, each named after the main town in the region. There is also a strip of land in the Central Ranges zone to the west of the line of the three regions that is warmer, and an area to the east of the southern two that is cooler and includes wineries and vineyards around Bathurst.
