= Mudgee wine region =

Mudgee
- Wine region
- Year established: 2000
- Country: Australia
- Part of: Central Ranges
- Location: 32.5°S 149.8°E
- Climate region: Humid subtropical/maritime
- Heat units: 2050
- Precipitation (annual average): 360 millimetres (14 in)
- Varietals produced: Shiraz, Cabernet Sauvignon, Merlot
- No. of wineries: over 35

Mudgee is a wine region and Australian Geographical Indication in the Central Ranges zone in the Australian state of New South Wales. It is named for the town of Mudgee.

Grapes were first grown around Mudgee from 1858, reaching a peak of 55 vineyards in 1893. Large wineries started planting again from 1974. Mudgee grows predominantly red wine varieties, especially Shiraz, Cabernet Sauvignon and Merlot.

== Winemaking ==
With a viticultural history that stretches back to 1858, Mudgee has played a key role in Australian viticultural history. Mudgee is primarily a producer of red wines, but the region also has a clone of Chardonnay.

=== Wineries in Mudgee ===
- 1838 Wines
- Blue Wren Wines
- Botobolar
- Broombee Organic
- Bunnamagoo Estate Wines
- Burnbrae Wines
- Burrundulla Wines
- Charnwood Estate
- Craigmoor Wines
- deBeaurepaire
- diLusso Estate
- Elephant Mountain Wines
- Elliot Rocke Estate
- Eloquesta Wines
- Ernest Schuetz Estate
- First Ridge Wines
- Gilbert Wines
- Gooree Park
- Heslop Wines
- High Valley Wine & Cheese
- Huntington Estate Wines
- Lazy Oak Wines
- Logan Wines
- Lowe Wines
- Manners Wine
- Mansfield
- Martins Hill Wines
- Miramar Wines
- Mudgee Wines
- Naked Lady Wines
- Petersons
- Pieter van Gent
- Queens Pinch
- Quilty Wines
- Robert Oatley Vineyards
- Robert Stein
- Rosby
- Run Rabbit Wines
- Short Sheep
- Skimstone
- The Small Winemakers Centre
- Thistle Hill
- Thumbprint Wines
- V3 Wine
- Vinifera Wines
- Walter Wines
- Wineries at Rylstone
