= Chris Mitchell (journalist) =

Australian journalist

Christopher John Mitchell AO is an Australian journalist. He was the editor-in-chief of The Australian from 2002 to 2015.

== Journalism career ==
In 1973 Mitchell began his career as a 17-year-old cadet on the former afternoon Brisbane tabloid, The Telegraph. After working at the Townsville Bulletin, The Daily Telegraph and the Australian Financial Review, he joined The Australian in 1984. He turned down a dentistry scholarship to pursue a career in newspapers.

In 1992, aged 35, Mitchell was appointed editor of The Australian. In 1995 he became editor-in-chief of Queensland Newspapers. In the role, he had editorial oversight of The Cairns Post, Townsville Bulletin and Gold Coast Bulletin.

In 2002 he returned to The Australian as editor-in-chief. Mitchell retired from the position in December 2015. Mitchell continued as a columnist at the paper. Prior to his retirement, Mitchell had completed 42 years as a journalist with 24 of those years as an editor. Rupert Murdoch praised his contributions as News Corporation's longest serving editor worldwide.

In 2016, a book of Mitchell's memoirs entitled Making Headlines was published by Melbourne University Press. Speaking at its launch, Prime Minister Malcolm Turnbull described the book as containing "a crisp plain English account of the dynamics of politics and the media in Australia".

== Controversy ==
In 1996, the newspaper Mitchell edited at the time, The Courier-Mail, claimed that the prominent Australian historian Manning Clark had been awarded the Order of Lenin. This claim was later shown to be false.

=== Climate change ===
Mitchell was named by ethicist and board member of the Climate Change Authority, Clive Hamilton, as one of Australia's "Dirty Dozen", a list people he believed to be "doing the most to block action on climate change in Australia". He featured in editions of the list published in 2006, 2009 and 2014. In 2010, Mitchell claimed that he had been defamed by journalist and academic Julie Posetti in a series of tweets she posted from a journalism conference claiming that former reporter for The Australian, Åsa Wahlquist, found Mitchell's editorial direction on climate change issues "prescriptive" and stifling. Posetti refused to apologise when tapes of the conference seemed to back her version of events.

In 2017, Mitchell wrote an opinion piece entitled "Climate hysteria hits 'peak stupid' in hurricane season".

== Other roles ==
As of November 2020 he is an ambassador for the Australian Indigenous Education Foundation.

== Awards and recognition ==
In the 2019 Australia Day Honours Mitchell was made an Officer of the Order of Australia (AO) for "distinguished service to the print media through senior editorial roles, as a journalist, and to Indigenous education programs".
