= Robert Stein Wines =

Australian winery

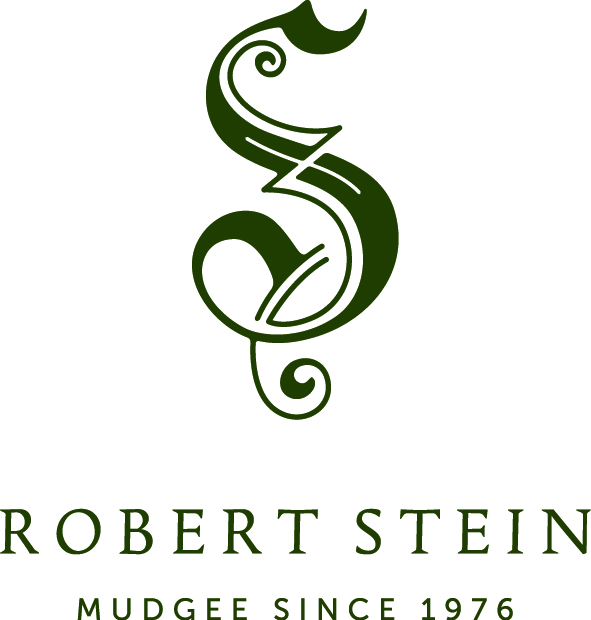
- Location: Pipeclay Road, Mudgee, NSW, Australia
- Wine region: Mudgee Wine Region
- Founded: 1976
- First vines planted: Shiraz, Chardonnay, Riesling & Gewürztraminer
- First vintage: 1981
- Key people: Robert Stein, Andrew Stein, Jacob Stein,
- Known for: Riesling
- Varietals: Cabernet Sauvignon, Shiraz, Chardonnay, Merlot, Riesling
- Distribution: International
- Tasting: Open to public
- Website: robertstein.com.au

Robert Stein Wines trace their winemaking history back to 1838, when the Macarthur family brought Johann Stein to Australia with the country's first cuttings of Rhine Riesling. 138 years later, in 1976, Robert 'Bob' Stein purchased 75 acres in Mudgee and planted vines. Robert Stein Winery currently have approximately 20 wines.

== Winemaker ==
Jacob Stein is the third generation winemaker and returned to Robert Stein Wines in 2009 to take over the winemaking duties. Prior to this Jacob worked vintages in Germany (in the Rheingau and Rheinhessen regions), Italy, Canada, Western Australia and Victoria.

In 2011 he was named 'International Up and Coming Riesling Winemaker' at the Canberra International Riesling Challenge and 2012 Gourmet Traveller Young Winemaker of the Year.

Robert Stein wines have been awarded the Douglas Lamb Perpetual Trophy for the Best Riesling at the Sydney Royal Wine Show for their 2016 Robert Stein Dry Riesling in 2019 and 2021. At the 2024 Sydney Royal Wine Show Robert Stein wines was awarded three Trophies, including the Douglas Lamb Perpetual Trophy, for their Rieslings

In 2025 Jacob Stein, with his wife Gina, purchased the winery, vineyard and farm.

== History ==
The Robert Stein vineyards were planted on the slopes of Mount Buckaroo in 1976 with the first varieties planted comprising chardonnay, shiraz, riesling and gewürztraminer.

The Stein family were originally from Germany. Johann Stein, left his native Germany and sailed out to Australia on a ship named The Kinnear, arriving in 1838. He was one of several German 'vine dressers' brought to the new colony by the Macarthur family of Camden Park, as few of the early settlers had any knowledge of viticulture.

== See also ==
- Mudgee
- Mudgee Wine region
- Australian Wine
