= Botobolar Vineyard =

Coordinates: 32.4997°S 149.7190°E

Botobolar is a vineyard in Mudgee in the Central West of New South Wales in Australia. It was the first fully certified organic vineyard in Australia and was established in 1971. Botobolar was the family vineyard of Gilbert ("Gil") and Vincie Wahlquist. Åsa Wahlquist has also worked at Botobolar as a winemaker.

== See also ==
- New South Wales wine
