= Max Lake =

Australian winemaker and surgeon (1924–2009)

Max Emory Lake, OAM (24 July 1924 – 14 April 2009) was an Australian winemaker and surgeon, who is generally regarded as the "father of the Australian boutique wine industry".

== Early life and education ==
Lake was born in 1924 in Albany, in upstate New York in the United States, where his parents, David and Hannah, worked in the film industry. He had a sister and three brothers. His family moved to Sydney where his father ran the Australian division of Metro-Goldwyn-Mayer. Lake went to Bellevue Hill Public School and then Sydney Boys' High School.

He studied medicine at the University of Sydney, where he met another medical student, Joy Townsend, his future wife.

== Career ==
=== Surgical career ===
Following graduation from the University of Sydney, Lake studied surgery at the Royal College of Surgeons in England in the early 1950s and went on to become the first Australian surgeon to specialise in hand surgery. He gave up his work as a surgeon in 1979 to concentrate on his interest in wine and food.

=== Winemaking career ===
In 1963, Lake founded Lake's Folly, a winery in the Hunter Region in New South Wales considered to be Australia's first boutique winery and a major influence on the Australian wine industry. In 1988, The Bulletin magazine called Lake "the man who started the (Australian) wine boom".

His wife and son, Stephen, were active in the winery. Stephen said that "Dad was the boss, Mum the brains and I was the brawn".

In addition to making wine, Lake wrote widely on wine and food. In 1966, he published the landmark book Classic Wines of Australia, followed by several other books about wine including Hunter Wine, Scents and Sensuality and Food on the Plate, Wine in the Glass. Many of these books relate to his third career as a "flavourolgist", his description of his "attempt to understand how taste, smell and flavour shaped humanity". Flavour and pleasure were two guiding principles in his life.

== Death ==
Lake died on 14 April 2009, aged 84, at his home in Longueville on Sydney's Lower North Shore, after sustaining a head injury from a fall.

== Personal life ==
Lake married fellow medical student Joy Townsend in 1948. Max and Joy had twins, David and Paula, who were born in Brisbane in 1950, and Stephen, born in Sydney in 1955.

== Honours ==
In the 2002 Australia Day Honours, Lake was awarded the Order of Australia Medal for service to the establishment of the boutique wine industry in Australia as a winemaker, judge, promoter and author.
