= Mount View, New South Wales =

Locality in New South Wales, Australia

Coordinates: 32°51′S 151°17′E

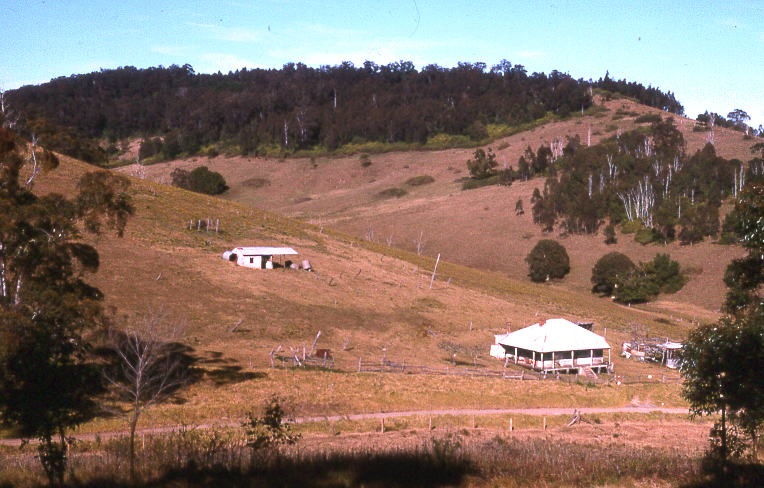
Mount View, as seen walking along the Great North Walk

Mount View, New South Wales is a rural locality located in the Hunter Region wine region in New South Wales Australia. It is located Between Cessnock and Wollombi and is a part of the City of Cessnock local government area. It has ideal climate, soil, and temperature for viticultural pursuits, which have been practised here since the mid-19th century. The road from Cessnock to Mount View provides access to the Great North Walk, and to lookouts with excellent views of the Hunter Region.

== Geography ==
Mount View is located in the Hunter Valley region, it is blanketed in a dense forest with periodic clearing throughout its foothills. The area around the mountain is mostly rural pastures, littered with small farmhouses. There are some creeks that run down from the mountains peak, these provide water to the surrounding rural area.
