= Murray Tyrrell (winemaker) =

Australian winemaker

- Born: 10 February 1921; Cessnock, New South Wales
- Died: 2 October 2000 (aged 79); Sydney, New South Wales
- Occupation: Winemaker
- Known for: Promoting Australian pinot noir and chardonnay internationally

Murray Davey Tyrrell AM (10 February 1921 – 2 October 2000) was an Australian winemaker.

== Biography ==
He served in the armed force during World War II, and later worked as a cattleman. In 1959 he took over the Tyrell family's winery.

With Len Evans, Tyrrell developed the Rothbury estate from the late 1960s until their relationship ended in 1981.

He was prominent in the development of the wine industry in the Hunter Valley of New South Wales, and for many years was regarded as the leading promoter and spokesperson for the wine industry there, popularizing Australian pinot noir and chardonnay. He was an advocate for traditional winemaking, against the industry's move towards more technological winemaking from around the 1970s.

In the 1986 Australia Day Honours, he was appointed a Member of the Order of Australia (AM) for "service to the wine industry and to tourism".

In November 1988, the Australian Wine and Brandy Corporation suspended his export licence following the discovery that Tyrrell's Vineyards wine contained excessive levels of sorbitol, a banned non-toxic additive. It was restored a few weeks later after Tyrrell's Vineyards promised to follow the rules. There were concerns this would be damaging to the Australian export market in light of the effects of similar scandals following the Chernobyl disaster and in Austria.

== External sources ==
- An interview with Murray Tyrrell by Mel Platt
