= Brown Brothers Milawa Vineyard =

Australian wine company

- Company type: Private
- Industry: Wine
- Founded: 1889
- Headquarters: Milawa, Victoria, Australia
- Products: Tarrango, Orange Muscat & Flora, Cienna, Dolcetto & Syrah, Spatlese Lexia, Shiraz etc
- Website: http://www.brownbrothers.com.au

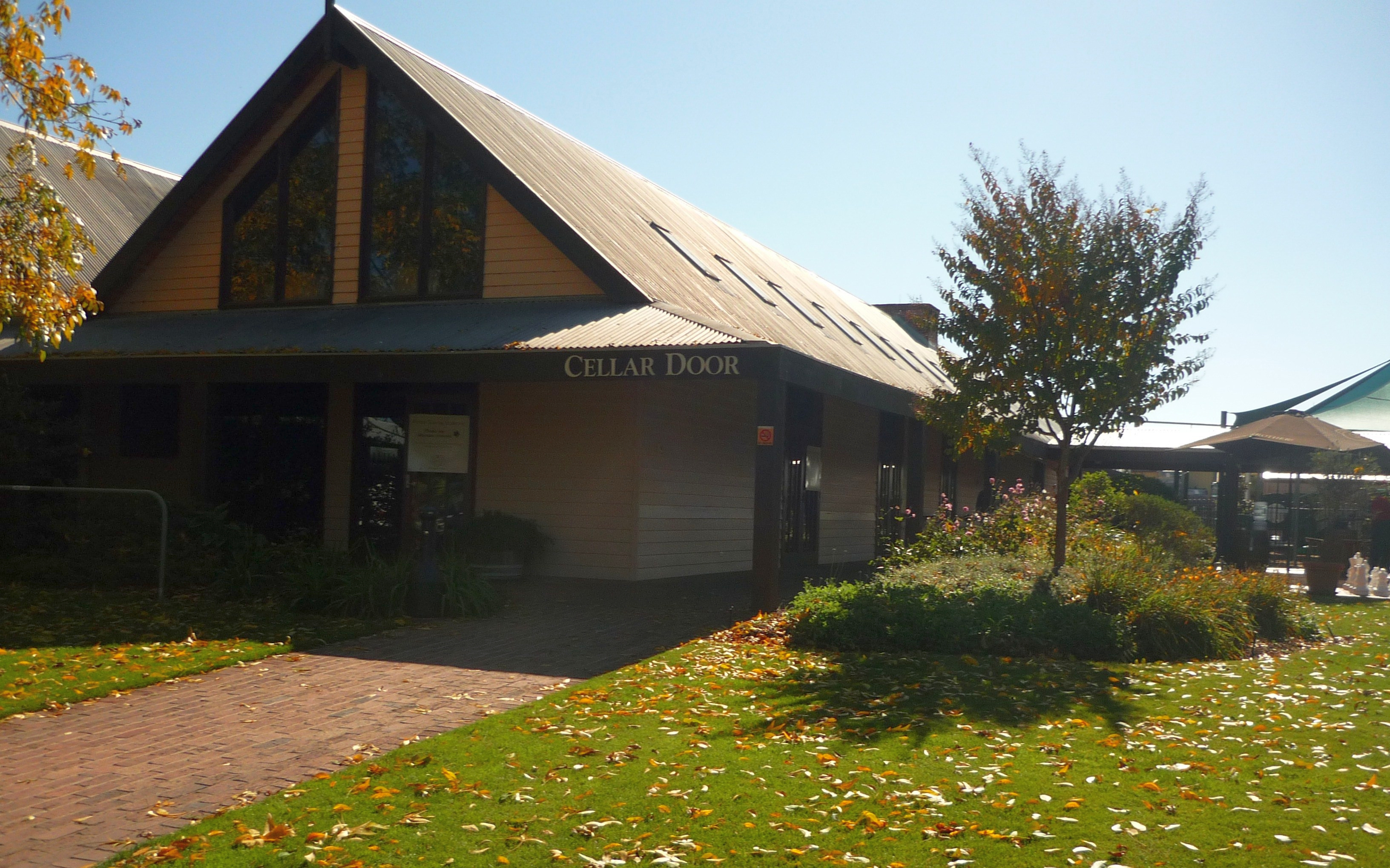
Cellar door.

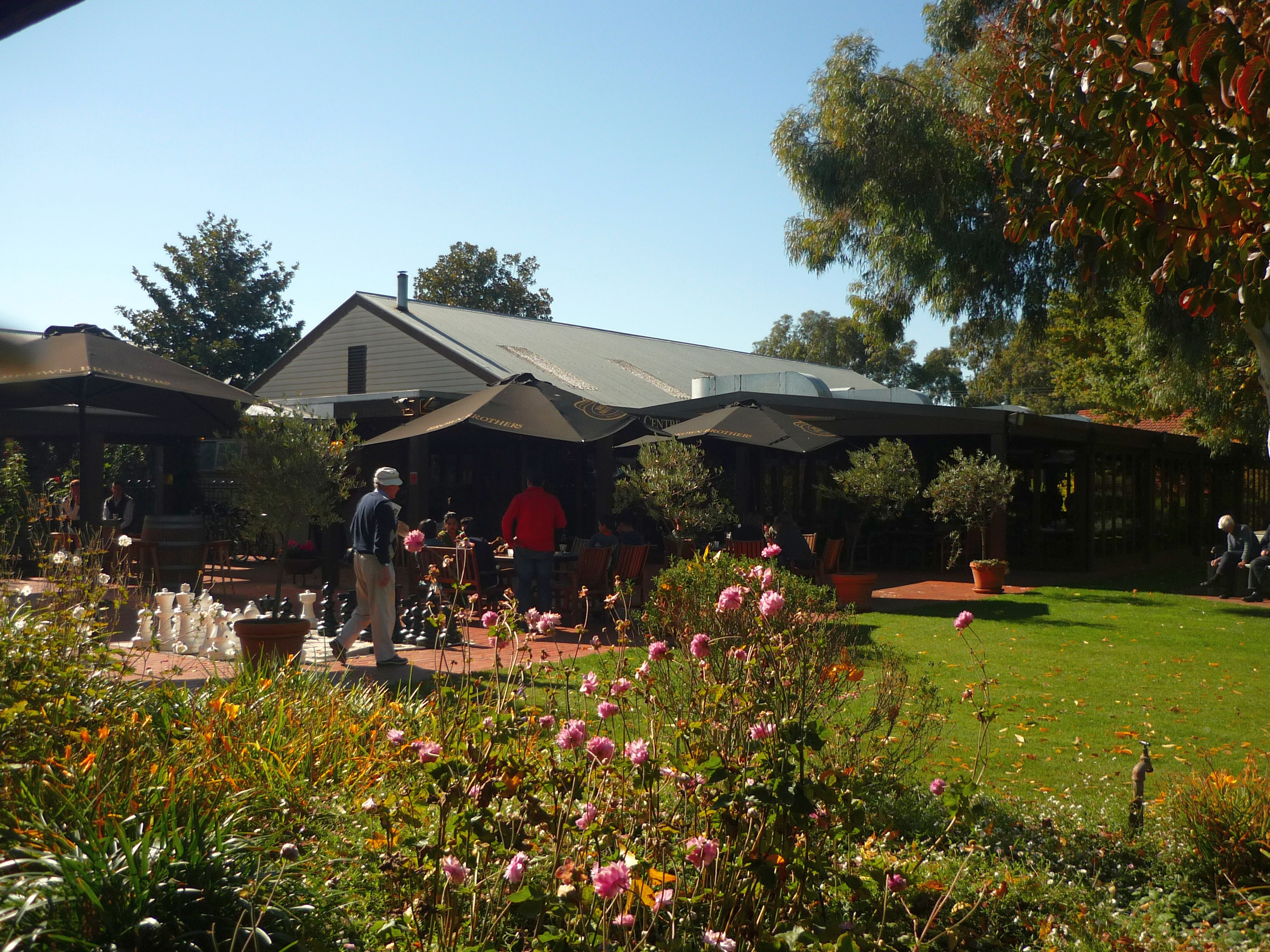
Vineyard gardens

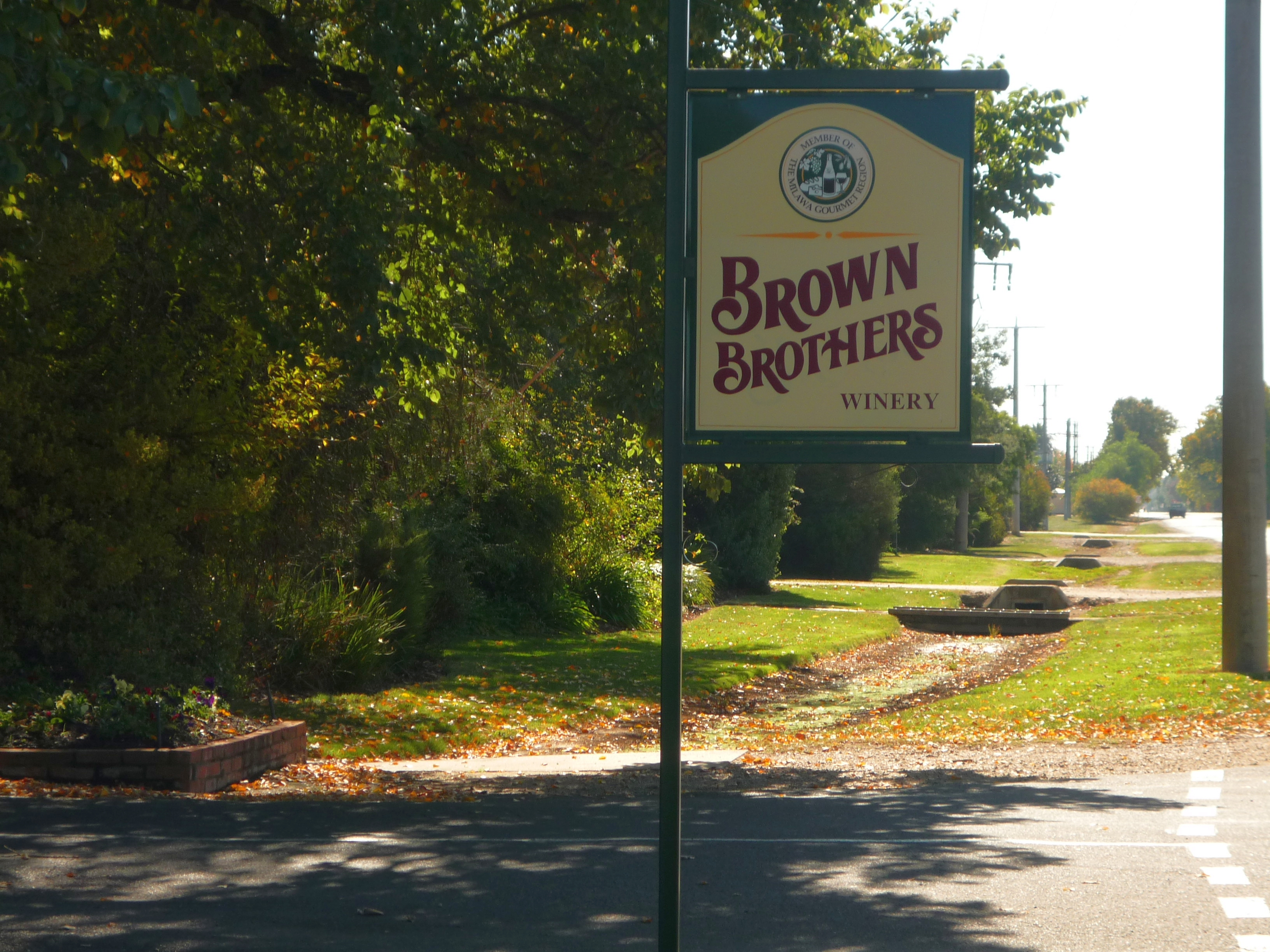
Entrance signage

Brown Brothers Milawa Vineyard is a family-owned wine company based in Milawa, Victoria, Australia. Brown Brothers was founded in 1889 by John Francis Brown and continues to be owned and operated by his descendants on the original property. Brown Brothers makes wine from a wide range of grape varieties and into a range of styles.

== History ==
In 2009, Brown Brothers was asked to join Australian wine alliance Australia's First Families of Wine a multimillion-dollar venture to help resurrect the fortunes of the $6 billion industry highlighting the quality and diversity of Australian wine. The 12 member alliance includes Brown Brothers, Campbells, Taylors, DeBortoli, McWilliam’s, Tahbilk, Tyrell’s, Yalumba, D'Arenberg, Howard Park, Jim Barry and Henschke. The main criteria are that the family-owned companies need to have a "landmark wine" in their portfolios listed under Langton’s Classification and/or 75% agreement by group that a wine is considered "iconic", must have the ability to do at least a 20-year vertical tasting, have a history going back a minimum of two generations, ownership of vineyards more than 50 years old and/or ownership of distinguished sites which exemplify the best of terroir, commitment to export and environmental best practice, appropriate cellar door experience, and be paid-up members of the Winemakers Federation of Australia.

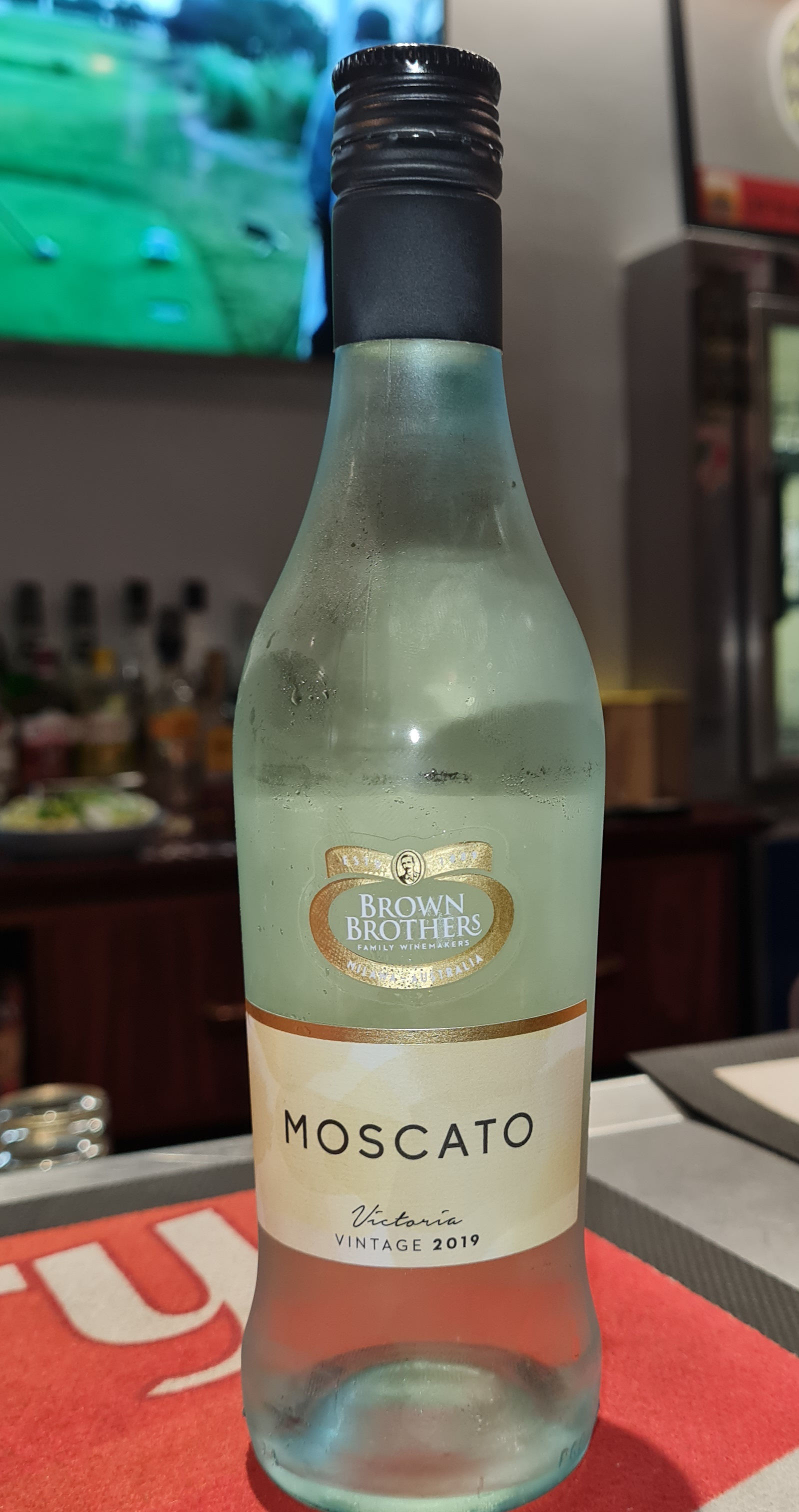
Brown Brothers White Moscato. 275mL bottle

=== Grape varieties ===
Brown Brothers is known for including uncommon and novel grape varieties in their product line, including Cienna, Tarrango, and Mystique, alongside classic grapes.

Brown Brothers has made wine from the following grape varieties over the years.

- White: Arneis, Chenin blanc, Chardonnay, Chasselas, Colombard, Crouchen, Flora, Gewürztraminer, Sauvignon blanc, Gordo, Marsanne, Moscato, Muscat of Alexandria (Lexia), Orange Muscat, Pinot grigio, Rhine Riesling, Roussanne, Sultana, Sylvaner, Trebbiano, Verdelho, Viognier, Vermentino, White Frontignac
- Red: Aglianico, Barbera, Cabernet Franc, Cabernet Sauvignon, Cienna, Dolcetto, Durif, Graciano, Lagrein, Malbec, Marzemino, Merlot, Mystique, Meunier, Mondeuse, Nebbiolo, Petit Verdot, Pinot noir, Ruby Cabernet, Sangiovese, Schioppettino, Shiraz, Tarrango, Tempranillo, Zinfandel

=== Wine styles ===
- Fortified: The fortified wine has been in a range of styles including Tawny Port, Ruby Port, Vintage Port, Flor Fino Sherry, Sweet Sherry, Muscat & Tokay.
- Table Wine: The table wines have ranged from dry to sweet, usually straight varietals, but occasionally blends such as Shiraz/Cabernet, Shiraz/Mondeuse/Cabernet (SMC)
- Dessert Wine: The dessert wines have included a blend of the Orange Muscat & Flora varieties and a Botrytis Riesling labelled Noble Riesling.
- Sparkling Wine: The Sparkling wines are mostly in the Méthode Champenoise with grapes from the Whitlands vineyard but there has also been other styles such as a Sparkling Shiraz. Brown Brothers are also a leader in King Valley Prosecco, and also blends of Lexia and Cienna for its Rosé, and also with natural flavourings. It is known as Zibbibo, a synonym for Muscat of Alexandria

== Vineyards ==
Brown Brothers has vineyards in Victoria, Australia and Tasmania, Australia with a variety of climates and soil types.

- Milawa, Victoria (Established: 1885 36°27.2′S 146°25.6′E) Varieties: Merlot, Riesling, Cabernet Sauvignon, Dolcetto, Graciano, Mondeuse, Shiraz & White Frontignac.
- Mystic Park, Victoria (Established: 1968 35°36′S 143°45′E) Varieties: Cienna, Dolcetto, Tarrango, Orange Muscat, Flora, Crouchen, Shiraz, Colombard & Chardonnay
- Banksdale, Victoria (Established: 1994 36°39.6′S 146°18.68′E) Varieties: Chardonnay, Cabernet Sauvignon, Shiraz, Pinot grigio, Viognier & Tempranillo
- Kayena, Tasmania (Established: 1994) Varieties: Riesling, Sauvignon blanc, Pinot gris, Gewurztraminer, Chardonnay, Gewürztraminer, Cabernet, Alvarinho, Viognier & Pinot noir
- Heathcote, Victoria (Established: 1999 36°28.3′S 144°47.07′E) Varieties: Shiraz, Merlot, Durif, Malbec, Sangiovese, Tempranillo, Petit Verdot, Dolcetto & Pinot grigio
- Devil's Corner (Established: 2005) Varieties: Pinot noir, Chardonnay, Sauvignon blanc, Pinot gris, Riesling, Gewurztraminer & Savagnin
- The Hazards, Tasmania
