= Yalumba =

Australian winery near Angaston, South Australia

- Location: Angaston, South Australia, Australia
- Coordinates: 34°30′48″S 139°03′19″E
- Wine region: Barossa Valley
- Founded: 1849
- Key people: Samuel Smith
- Cases/yr: 750,000
- Known for: The Reserve Cabernet Sauvignon Shiraz and The Octavius Old Vine Barossa Shiraz
- Varietals: Shiraz, Cabernet Sauvignon, Merlot
- Website: www.yalumba.com

Yalumba is an Australian winery located near the town of Angaston, South Australia in the Barossa Valley wine region. It was founded by a British brewer, Samuel Smith, who emigrated to Australia with his family from Wareham, Dorset in August 1847 aboard the ship China. Upon arriving in Adelaide in December, Smith built a small house on the banks of the River Torrens. He lived there less than a year before moving north to Angaston where he purchased a 30-acre (120,000 m^{2}) block of land on the settlement's south eastern boundary. He named his property "Yalumba" after an indigenous Australian word for "all the land around". In 1849 Smith and his son Sidney planted Yalumba's first vineyards, beginning the Yalumba dynasty. Until the 1960s Yalumba was known for fortified wines. As at 2022 it was ranked the twelfth largest Australian wine company by production and ninth largest in terms of total revenue.

== Overview ==
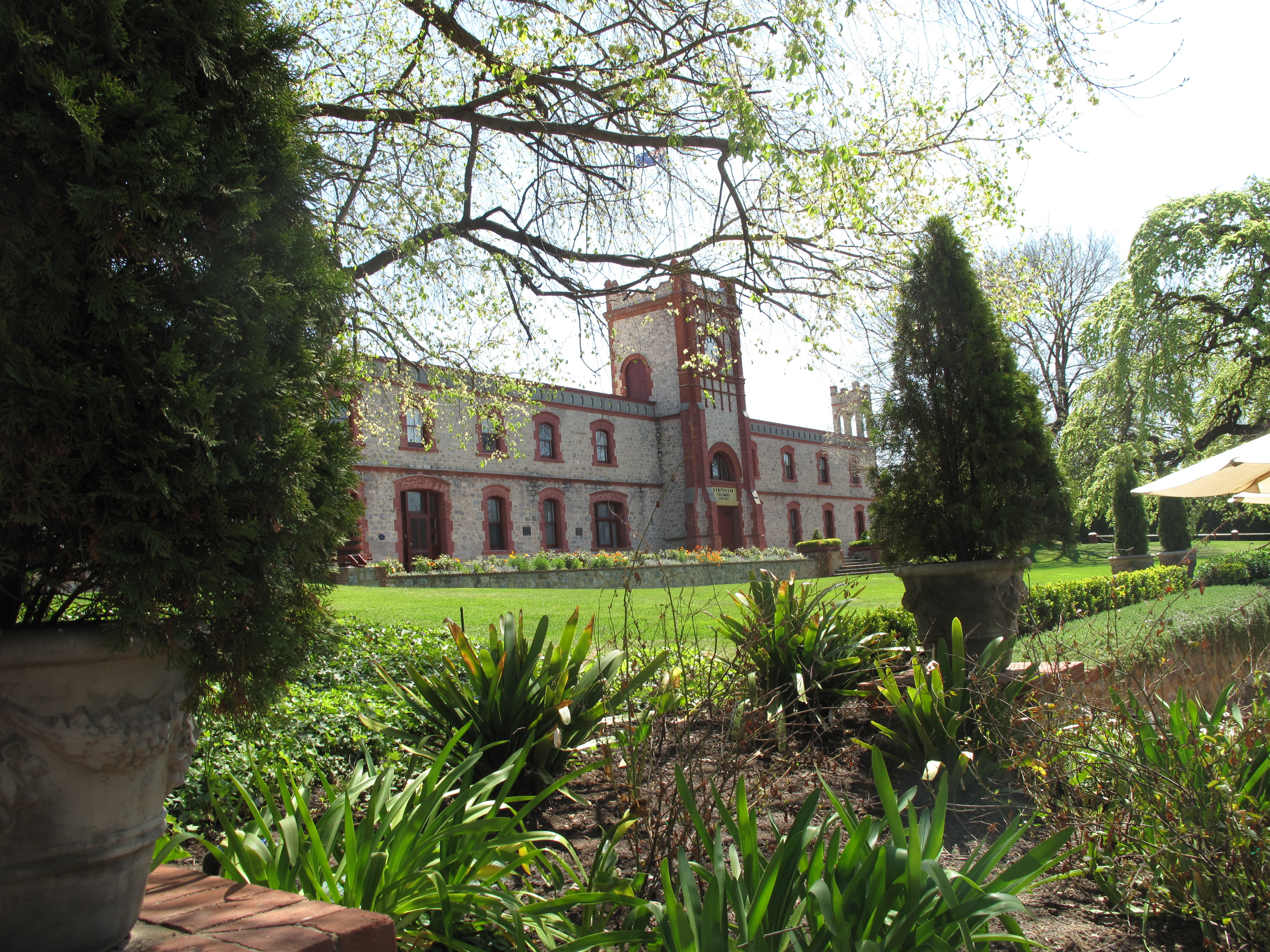
Yalumba Winery in Angaston

Yalumba is part of Australian wine alliance Australia's First Families of Wine, a multimillion-dollar venture to help resurrect the fortunes of the $6 billion industry while highlighting the quality and diversity of Australian wine. The twelve-member alliance includes Brown Brothers, Campbells, Taylors, DeBortoli, McWilliam’s, Tahbilk, Tyrell’s, Yalumba, D'Arenberg, Howard Park, Jim Barry and Henschke. The main criteria are that the family-owned companies need to have a "landmark wine" in their portfolios as listed under Langton’s Classification and/or 75% agreement by group that a wine is considered "iconic"; have the ability to do at least a 20-year vertical tasting; have a history going back a minimum of two generations; have ownership of vineyards more than 50 years old and/or ownership of distinguished sites which exemplify the best of terroir; and be paid-up members of the Winemakers Federation of Australia.

== See also ==
- Australian wine
- Cult wine
- South Australian food and drink
- List of wineries in the Barossa Valley
- Australia's First Families of Wine
