= Jeremy Oliver =

Australian wine writer

Jeremy Oliver (born 29 December 1961) is an Australian wine writer, commentator, educator and presenter. Self-published with over 25 years experience, Oliver is the author of the wine guide, The Australian Wine Annual (first published 1997). He is fully independent with no exclusive ties to any media outlet, publishing house or wine producer.

After publishing his first book, Thirst for Knowledge, in 1984, Oliver became the world's youngest professional wine writer. In 2005 Oliver was named the inaugural Wine Writer of the Year by the Australian Wine Selector magazine.

== Career ==
Born in Ballarat, Victoria, Oliver was educated at Melbourne Grammar School.

He completed a Bachelor of Agricultural Science at the University of Melbourne in 1982. Oliver then spent a year in Coonawarra, during which he worked at Lindeman's and Katnook Estate. Following this, in 1984, he completed a Graduate Diploma in Wine at Roseworthy College.

Being one of the few International wine writers with a formal tertiary education in winemaking and viticulture he has stated that if you're going to write critically about wine, the least you can do is to learn how to make it.

Oliver is both a presenter and regular MC of corporate and wine-related events. He has hosted many wine events in Australia including the Maurice O’Shea Award.

In 2006, he toured Australia, hosting wine and cricket dinners (Wine and Wickets) with the legendary cricket commentator, Henry Blofeld.

Oliver is a member of the Melbourne Food and Wine Festival's honorary Board.

== Books and media ==
Jeremy Oliver has authored more than twenty books and written for dozens of publications in many countries including the UK, the US, Russia, Korea, Singapore, Japan and China.

He appears regularly on the Australian Sky News Business Channel and has made hundreds of other appearances on radio and television.

His first book, Thirst For Knowledge, was a light-hearted but informative guide to wine. This was fully updated two years later as More Thirst for Knowledge.

At this time, Oliver was also contributing to a range of publications including The Age in Melbourne. In 1992 he released a wine biography of Len Evans titled Evans on Earth.

Oliver has released a series of three books called The Australian Wine Handbook, which rate both current and back vintages of Australia's most important wines. This concept was the inspiration for Jeremy Oliver's present releases of The Australian Wine Annual, which was first published in 1997. This wine guide features his tasting notes, ratings and commentary.

In 2009, Oliver released Enjoying Wine With Jeremy, becoming the first western wine critic to create and publish a book in China. The book is purpose-written to educate the emerging Chinese market about wine and to encourage them to try Australian wine. Published in simplified Chinese, Enjoying Wine with Jeremy is packed with information about the enjoyment of wine, tasting notes, labels and ratings of 290 Australian wines currently available in the Chinese market.

Jeremy also operates his own wine information website, www.jeremyoliver.com.

== Wine scoring methodology ==
When assessing and marking wines: Oliver allocates each a score out of 20. The scores are given on this basis: Wines that score an average of 15.5 out of 20 in Australian wine shows are awarded a bronze medal. Those that score 17.0 are awarded Silver and those that score 18.5 are awarded gold medals.

Wine Ranking	Regular Score in Jeremy Oliver's Tastings	Medal Equivalent	Jeremy Oliver 100-point score equivalent
1	18.8+	Top Gold Medal	96+
2	18.3 - 18.7	Regular Gold Medal	94 - 95
3	17.8 - 18.2	Top Silver Medal	92 - 93
4	17.0 - 17.7	Regular Silver Medal	90 - 91
5	16.0 - 16.9	Top Bronze medal	87 - 89

== Current ==
Today Jeremy Oliver also works in an ambassadorial capacity for Australian wine, having forged close relationships with Austrade and the Market Development Advisory Committee (formerly known as the Australian Wine Export Council).

Oliver is a recognised Australian wine personality and the face of Australian wine overseas, particularly in Asian markets. He regularly represents the Australian wine industry in key export markets.

Oliver first put the spotlight on wine makers and brands that have become Australian icons and household names including Giaconda Winery, Bindi, Clonakilla and Epis.
