= D'Arenberg Cube =

d'Arenberg Cube
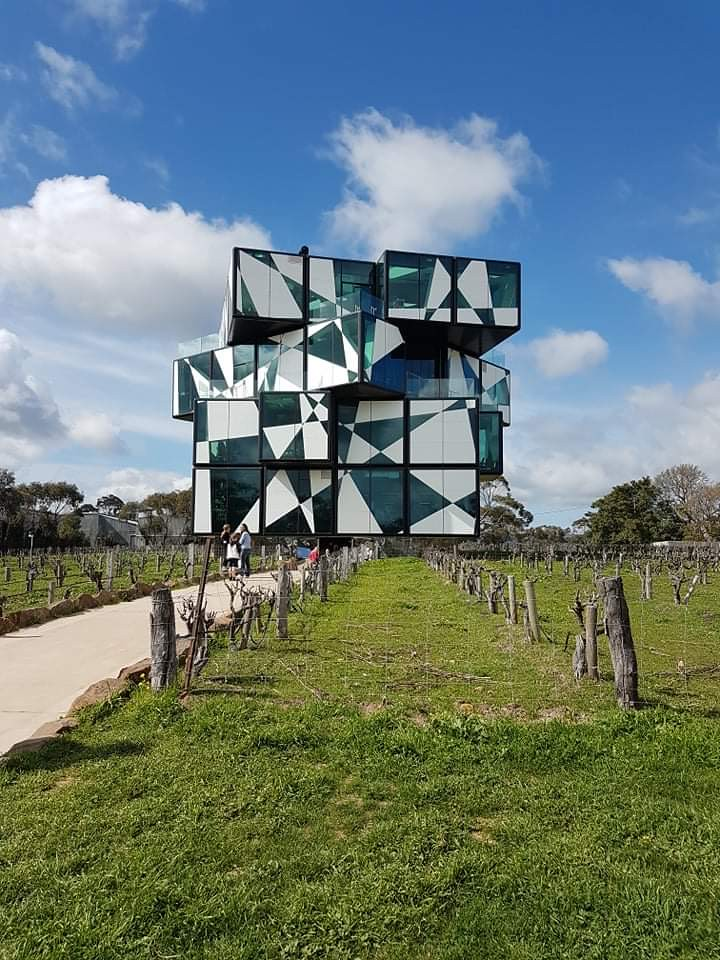
- D'Arenberg Cube
- Interactive map of the d'Arenberg Cube area

General information
- Type: Multi-use
- Architectural style: Modernist
- Location: 58 Osborn Road, McLaren Vale, South Australia, Australia
- Coordinates: 35°11′48″S 138°33′05″E
- Construction started: 2014
- Completed: 2017
- Cost: $15 million

Technical details
- Floor count: 5

Design and construction
- Architecture firm: ADS Architects
- Structural engineer: CPR Engineers
- Services engineer: Bestec
- Main contractor: Sarah Constructions

Website
- www.darenberg.com.au/darenberg-cube/

d'Arenberg Cube is a five-storey building situated within the d'Arenberg vineyards in the locality of McLaren Vale in South Australia. The design concept for the building was developed by d'Arenberg's Chief Winemaker, Chester Osborn, who is of the fourth generation of the Osborn family, who established the vineyards in 1912. Completed in 2017, the building is noted for its distinctive geometric design, largely resembling a Rubik's Cube, with its facades predominantly consisting of double-tempered glass.

The d'Arenberg Cube is a multi-use building that features a restaurant known as the d'Arenberg Cube Restaurant, a wine tasting room, a virtual fermenter, a 360-degree video room and the Alternate Realities Museum, which features numerous art installations.

== History ==
In 2003, Chester Osborn, heavily inspired by Toyo Ito’s Serpentine Gallery Pavilion of 2002, “came up with” the idea to create a cube-shaped building inspired by the puzzles and complexities of winemaking. Osborn presented the design to the board, however it was disapproved of by his third generation family members. Construction of the building however commenced in 2014 and was completed in 2017, with the official opening held on 14 December of that year.

In the following year, the d'Arenberg Cube attained eight awards. On 4 May 2018, the building won a Professional Excellence Award in the Category of Commercial Construction $5 Million to $25 Million. The award was presented to Sarah Constructions at the 2018 South Australian Professional Excellence in Building Awards at the National Wine Centre of Australia in Adelaide. On 17 May 2018, the d'Arenberg Cube received a Good Design Award at the Sydney Opera House. Also in 2018, the d'Arenberg Cube was awarded first place in the NECA Excellence Award for Commercial Project SA/NT, as well as the International Best of Wine Tourism award at the Great Wine Capitals Global Network Best of Wine Tourism Awards 2018, an award for Best Architecture and Landscape at the Great Wine Capitals Global Network Best of Wine Tourism Awards 2018, the Award for Tourism at the McLaren Vale Business Awards 2018 and the Best Tourist Attraction Award and the Premier's Award for Service Excellence at the South Australian Tourism Awards 2018. The d'Arenberg Cube Restaurant was awarded the SA New Restaurant – Regional Award and a Silver Award for the Best New Restaurant at the Restaurant & Catering Awards for Excellence 2018, an award for Best New Restaurant at The Advertiser Food Awards 2018 and one chef's hat at the Good Food Guide Awards 2018. In 2019, the restaurant was named Regional Restaurant of the Year at the Gault & Milau Restaurant Awards 2019 and was awarded two chef's hats and a score of 14 in the Australian Good Food Guide.

== See also ==
- d'Arenberg
- Australian wine
- Australia's First Families of Wine
