= China Wine and Spirits Awards =

The China Wine and Spirits Awards (CWSA, Chinese:中国环球葡萄酒及烈酒大奖赛) wine and spirits competition is the biggest wine competition in Hong Kong and China.

CWSA Judges together sell 75 million bottles of wine and spirits per year, making CWSA the most influential wine and spirits awards in the world. The competition is focused on finding wines and spirits for the Chinese market. The wines and spirits are judged by 100 Chinese wine and spirits buyers; Importers, Distributors, Retailers. Producers looking to expand into the Chinese market, and those already in the market enter their products for judging.

Wines are blind tasted. The competition holds two competitions per year. Every Spring, China Wine and Spirits Best Value is held, the blind tasting is held by price range and wines and spirits that offer good value are awarded. The China Wine and Spirits Awards (CWSA) is held in Autumn and entrants are judged to find the best wines and spirits for the Chinese market. The awards receive entries from producers from more than 55 wine-producing countries.

== Judging ==
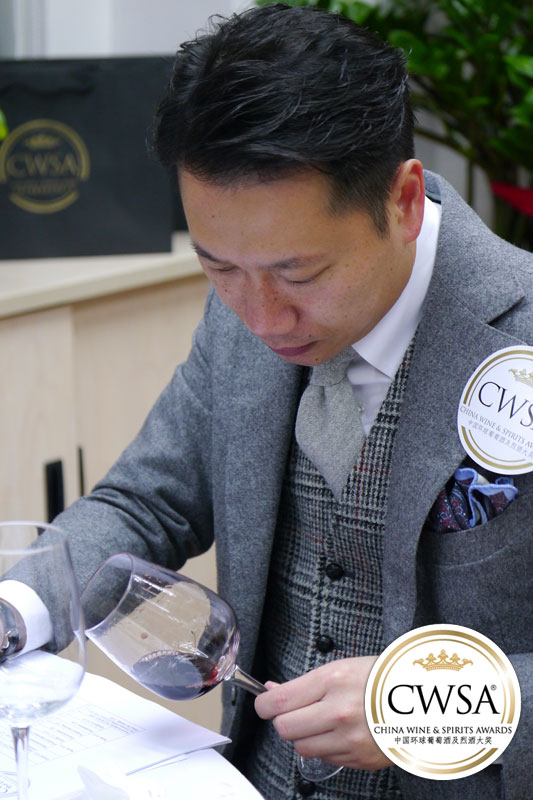

100 CWSA Judges, China based Importers, Distributors, Retailers and Sommeliers', all buyers of wines and spirits. Together they are responsible for sales of 75 million bottles of wine and spirits per year.

== Wine ==
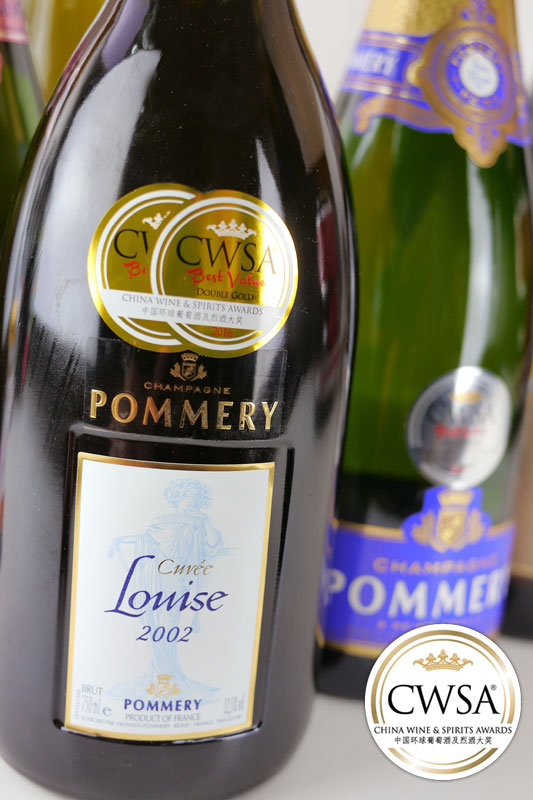

Wines enter from 55+ countries for blind tasting.

== Spirits ==
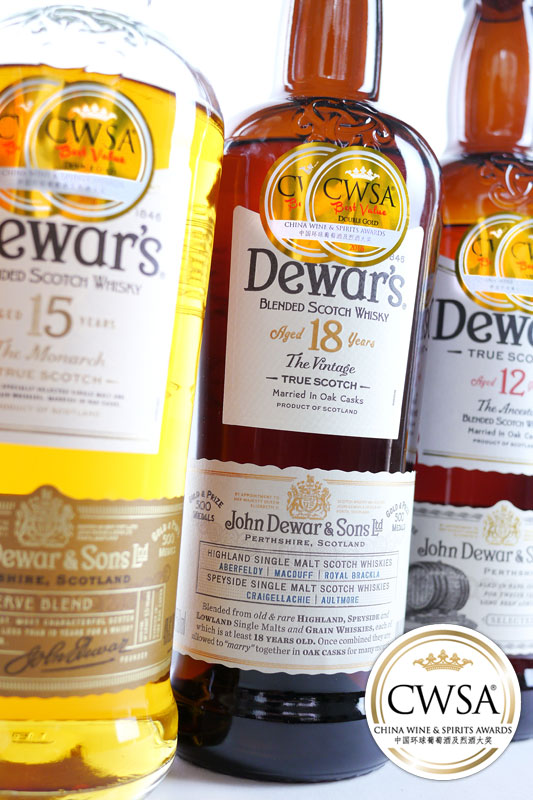

CWSA Judges sell 75 million bottles of wine and spirits per year, allegedly making CWSA the most influential whisky awards in the world.

== Structure ==
Two major competitions per year CWSA and CWSA Best Value.

== CWSA Competitions ==
=== CWSA ===
CWSA discovers wines and spirits suitable for the Hong Kong and China markets. Annually, held in Autumn.

=== CWSA Best Value ===
CWSA Best Value tastes wines and spirits in categories relating to price. Medals and Trophy are awarded to wines and spirits that are judged to give value for money. Annually, held in Spring.

== CWSA Medals ==
CWSA Winners are permitted to put CWSA Medal Stickers on bottles as identification of their medal. CWSA are ordered from CWSA organisation

=== Notable Winners ===
- Wolf Blass.
- Il Borro.
- HAIG CLUB by David Beckham.
- DFJ VINHOS.
- Glengoyne Distillery.
- Taylors Wines
- Francis Ford Coppola.
- Cambridge Distillery.
- Jacob's Creek.
- Beam Creek.
- Cooperativa Agrícola Santo Isidro De Pegõe.
- Sill Family Vineyards.
- Tussock Jumper Wines.
