= HPW =

HPW may refer to:

- Highly purified water, water of the highest quality used in the pharmaceutical and biopharmaceutical industries
- Howard Park Wines, a winery based in Margaret River and the Great Southern, Western Australia
- 711th Human Performance Wing, a wing of the United States Air Force based out of Wright-Patterson Air Force Base near Dayton, Ohio
- High Protein Wombaroo, a food supplement for fruit- and nectar-eating animals such as sugar gliders
