= AFFW =

AFFW may refer to:

- Australia's First Families of Wine
- Argument from free will
