= Cienna =

Australian wine grape variety

Cienna is a red Australian wine grape variety first harvested in 2000. It is a mix between the Spanish wine grape Sumoll and Cabernet Sauvignon grape. This grape was initially created in 1972 by CSIRO. The aim was to produce high quality grapes suited for Australian conditions. One of the most notable wineries that produces a light-style, light-alcohol Cienna wine is Brown Brothers from Victoria, Australia.

== See also ==
- Tarrango, another Australian wine grape variety bred by CSIRO and notably commercialised by Brown Brothers
- Mystique, another Australian wine grape variety bred by CSIRO and notably commercialised by Brown Brothers
