= Bass Phillip =

Winery in Victoria, Australia

Coordinates: 38.558183°S 145.879898°E

- Location: Leongatha, Victoria, Australia
- Appellation: Gippsland
- Other labels: Domaine Phillip Jones
- Founded: 1979
- Key people: Jean-Marie Fourrier, Adam Francis
- Cases/yr: 1500
- Known for: Reserve Pinot noir
- Varietals: Pinot noir, Chardonnay, Gewurztraminer, Gamay
- Website: http://www.bassphillip.com

Bass Phillip is an Australian winery based in Leongatha, within the Gippsland region of Victoria.

== History ==
Bass Phillip was established in 1979 by Phillip Jones, although it did not sell its first bottle of wine until 12 years later. The winery was named after the explorers George Bass and Arthur Phillip.

Initially Phillip Jones planted just under 3 hectares of Cabernet Sauvignon, with the intention of making a wine in the style of his favourite Bordeaux producer, Chateau Ducru Beaucaillou.

In the mid-1980s, after developing an interest in the Burgundy wines of Henri Jayer, Jones replanted the vineyard with Pinot noir and Chardonnay.

In 2001, Domaine Phillip Jones was formed in partnership with Paul Staindl to make Pinot noir from Mornington Peninsula and Leongatha vineyards that are not owned by the estate.

Bass Phillip has been using Biodynamic wine practices in its vineyards since 2006 after visiting Burgundy and seeing the difference that he believed that biodynamics had made to the wines of the producers he tasted. Bass Phillip does not have organic or biodynamic certification and is no longer allowed to include these terms on their labels.

Bass Phillip has been described by Jeni Port as "Australia's foremost maker of pinot noir" and by Robert Parker as making "brilliant Pinot noirs, undoubtedly the finest being produced in Australia".

== Wines and vineyards ==
About 1500 cases of wine are produced each vintage.

The most well regarded wine produced by Bass Phillip is the Reserve Pinot noir. Langton's Classification of Australian Wine placed this wine at their highest level of "Exceptional" in 2005 and 2010, with the Premium Pinot noir placed at the second highest level of "Outstanding" in 2000, 2005 and 2010.

Bass Phillip main vineyard in Leongatha is used to produce the Reserve, Premium and Estate level Pinot noir wines from 3.5 hectares of vines. This estate vineyard has a vine density of 9000 per hectare, much denser than a typical premium Australian Pinot noir vineyard.

Three other vineyards are owned by Bass Phillip - Belrose and Issan which are both 3 hectares and Village which is 9.5 hectares. Each of these vineyards produce a single vineyard Pinot noir labelled with the same name as the vineyard.

In addition to Pinot noir based wines, Bass Phillip produces two Chardonnay based wines with Estate and Premium designations as well as a Gamay, a Rosé and limited quantities of Gewürztraminer.

== See also ==
- Australian wine
