= Tarrango =

Variety of grape

Tarrango is a red grape variety used in Australian wine production. This slow-ripening grape was created in 1965 by the CSIRO Horticultural Research Station at Merbein in Victoria, Australia, as a hybrid of Touriga Nacional and Sultana in order to create wines of good acidity, but low in tannin. Its wines are often similar to Beaujolais in style. Requiring an unusually warm climate, it is principally grown in the wine-producing areas of northern Victoria and is named after the nearby parish of Tarrango, Victoria.

Brown Brothers has been the most prominent producer since the 1980s, selling Tarrango as a rosé.

== See also ==
- Cienna, another Australian wine grape variety bred by CSIRO and notably commercialised by Brown Brothers
- Mystique, another Australian wine grape variety bred by CSIRO and notably commercialised by Brown Brothers
- Taminga, another Australian wine grape variety bred by CSIRO to maintain acidity in the warm Australian climate
