= Samuel Smith (winemaker) =

Australian winemaker

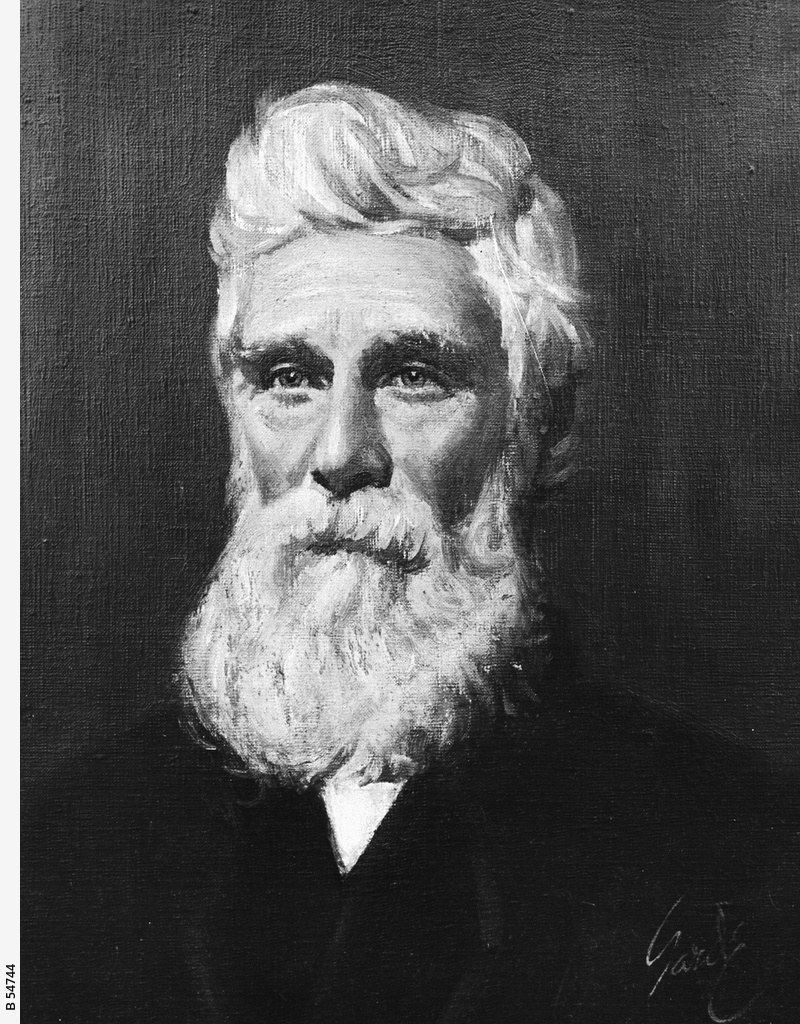
- Samuel Smith, founder of S.S. Smith and Son, Yalumba in 1849
- Born: 17 July 1812; Wareham, Dorset, England
- Died: 15 June 1889 (aged 76)
- Occupation(s): Brewer, vigneron, winemaker
- Known for: Founder of Yalumba

Samuel Smith (1812–1889) was an early vigneron and winemaker in the colony of South Australia. The winery he founded, Yalumba, is now the oldest family-owned winery in Australia.

Smith was born on 17 July 1812 at Wareham, Dorset in England. He became a brewer, married and had five children in England. The family migrated to South Australia on the China in 1847 and initially settled at Klemzig. By 1849, he had moved to Angaston and worked as a gardener for George Fife Angas. Smith bought 30 acres (12 ha) of land and established a vineyard and orchard at night, while still working for Angas during the day.

Smith and his son Sidney joined the Victorian gold rush in 1852. After four months and 16 shafts, they returned to South Australia with £300. He bought more land which he let out, two horses with harness and a plough, and saved the rest for cellars and a new house. By 1862, he had 9 acres (3.6 ha) planted to shiraz grapes. He also gave cuttings to his neighbours and bought grapes from them. In 1863 he produces 60 hogsheads of wine.

Smith was a member of the Angaston Congregational Church. He died of chronic Bright's disease on 15 June 1889.
