= Taminga =

Variety of grape

Taminga is white Australian wine grape variety that was developed in the late 20th century by viticulturalist and grape breeder Alan J. Antcliff at CSIRO. It is a cross of a previously created crossing Merbein 29-56 and the Vitis vinifera variety Traminer Rot (Gewürztraminer) Like Tarrango, a 1960s crossing between Touriga Nacional and Sultana, Taminga was bred to maintain high acidity levels while growing in hot Australian vineyards. Early results from Taminga show that it can ripen consistently in different vineyard location and produce wines that wine expert Jancis Robinson describes as "commercially acceptable.
