= Giaconda Winery =

Winery in Victoria, Australia

Giaconda is an Australian winery in Beechworth, Victoria.

== History ==
Throughout the 1970s Rick Kinzbrunner, a mechanical engineer, travelled and spent time with wineries in New Zealand, the US and France including Stag's Leap, Simi Winery and the owners of Chateau Petrus, the Moueix group. During his time in the United States he studied at University of California, Davis.

He came back to Australia in 1980 and took up an assistant winemaker role at Brown Brothers until 1982 when he purchased land in the Beechworth region, planting the original vines to be used for his wines under the Giaconda label. The initial planting consisted of Chardonnay, Cabernet Sauvignon, Merlot, Cabernet Franc, and Pinot noir. The winery is nine kilometres south-west of Beechworth.

The winery is named after the Mona Lisa, which is also known as La Gioconda in Italy.

The first Giaconda wines were released in 1987, with a Chardonnay from the 1986 vintage and Cabernet blend from 1985.

Kinzbrunner has been described as one of Australia's greatest winemakers. In 2003 he won the Australian Winemaker of the Year award from Australian Gourmet Traveller Wine Magazine and in July 2006 he was named one of the world's best 10 white wine makers by Decanter.

The Giaconda vineyard was noted as Australia's "most important vineyard" and was listed in first place of twenty five top vineyards by Australian Sommelier Magazine.

== Wines ==
Giaconda produces about 2500 cases of wine each year. Giaconda produces wine from Chardonnay, Roussanne, Pinot noir, Shiraz, Cabernet Sauvignon as well as a small amount from newly planted Nebbiolo grapes.

Two of Giaconda's wines are included in the Langton's Classification of Australian Wine, the Shiraz at the "Excellent" tier and the Chardonnay at the highest classification level of "Exceptional".

In the 2003 vintage, Giaconda released only one wine under their main label, a Cabernet Sauvignon, due to smoke damage to the grapes from the 2003 Eastern Victorian alpine bushfires. The grapes that could still be vinified were released under the label "McClay Road". Kinzbrunner has continued to make wine under this name in subsequent vintages, as a second tier label with fruit from young vines.

Giaconda has entered a joint venture with Chapoutier to collaborate on producing a Beechworth Shiraz from the Nantua vineyard called "Ergo Sum". The first wine released was from the 2008 vintage.

== Other projects ==
Kinzbrunner has been the importer within the Australasian region for Sirugue wine barrels since 1985.

Kinzbrunner makes two wines exclusively for Vintage Cellars under the "rk" label, a Chardonnay and a Shiraz.

Since 2005, Kinzbrunner has assisted as a winemaking consultant at the Star Lane Vineyard and Winery in Beechworth.
