= Australia's First Families of Wine =

Australian initiative to promote Australian wine

- Abbreviation: AFFW
- Formation: 2009
- Headquarters: Australia
- Affiliations: Winemakers Federation of Australia
- Website: www.australiasfirstfamiliesofwine.com.au

Australia's First Families of Wine (AFFW) is an Australian wine initiative to promote Australian wine.

== Members ==
- Brown Brothers, founded in 1885, with vineyards in the King Valley, Heathcote and Swan Hill wine regions of Victoria
- Campbells of Rutherglen, founded in 1870, with vineyards in the Rutherglen wine region of Victoria
- D'Arenberg (the Osborn family), founded in 1912, with vineyards in the McLaren Vale wine region of South Australia
- Henschke, founded in 1868, with vineyards in the Eden Valley and Adelaide Hills wine regions of South Australia
- Howard Park Wines (the Burch family), founded in 1986, with vineyards in the Margaret River and Great Southern wine regions of Western Australia
- Jim Barry Wines, founded in 1959, with vineyards in the Clare Valley and Coonawarra wine regions of South Australia
- Tahbilk (the Purbrick family), founded in 1860, with vineyards in the Nagambie Lakes wine region of Victoria
- Taylors Wines, founded in 1969, with vineyards in the Clare Valley wine region of South Australia
- Tyrrell's, founded in 1858, with vineyards in the Hunter Valley wine region of New South Wales, the Heathcote wine region of Victoria and the McLaren Vale wine region and Limestone Coast wine zone of South Australia
- Yalumba (the Hill Smith family), founded in 1849, with vineyards in the Eden Valley and the Barossa Valley wine regions of South Australia.

Inaugural members no longer included:

- McWilliam's Wines, founded in 1877, with vineyards in the Riverina, Hunter Valley and Hilltops wine regions of New South Wales, the Yarra Valley wine region of Victoria, the Coonawarra wine region of South Australia and the Margaret River wine region of Western Australia
- De Bortoli Wines, founded in 1928, with wineries and vineyards in the Riverina and Hunter Valley wine regions of New South Wales, and the Yarra Valley and Rutherglen wine regions of Victoria, with additional vineyards in the Heathcote and King Valley regions of Victoria

== See also ==
- Australian wine
- Langton's Classification of Australian Wine
- Australian Grape and Wine Authority
