= Clonakilla =

Winery in New South Wales, Australia

Clonakilla is an Australian winery based in the Canberra wine region of Murrumbateman, New South Wales.

== History ==
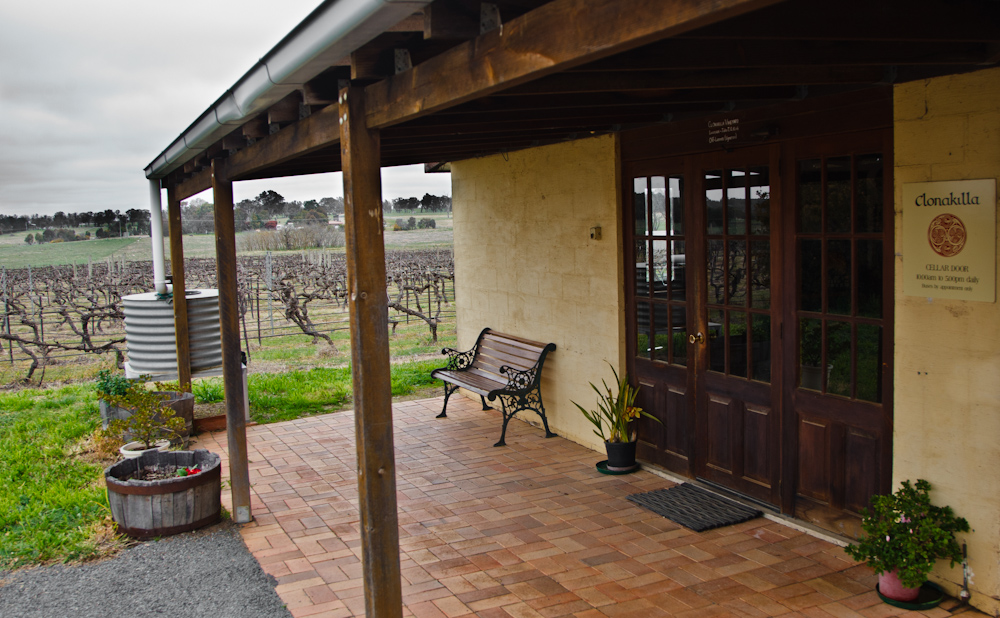
Clonakilla Cellar Door

Dr. John Kirk AM immigrated to Australia from the United Kingdom to work as a research scientist at the CSIRO in 1968. In 1971, he founded Clonakilla, named after the farm owned by his grandfather in County Clare, Ireland. The name of the winery translates to "meadow of the church".

Clonakilla was the first commercial winery to open in the region and John Kirk is often referred to as the "father" of the wine industry in the area. The first wines from the estate, a Riesling and a Cabernet Shiraz were produced in 1976 after initial difficulties with droughts and lack of irrigation. Like almost all the wineries in the Canberra district, it is not based in the Australian Capital Territory but across the border in New South Wales. This is due to the leasehold land system in the ACT which means a business can only lease land from the government and not own it.

After teaching religious education with Jesuits at Xavier College in Melbourne and spending holidays helping at the winery, John's fourth son, Tim Kirk, joined the winery full-time in 1996. Tim is currently the chief winemaker and served as the CEO from 2009 to 2023. John's sixth and youngest son, Stephen Kirk, took up the role of CEO in 2023.

== Wines ==
The Canberra wine region is a cool climate area and the wines produced by Clonakilla reflect this. Around 10,000 to 12,000 cases of wine are produced each year.

The flagship wine is the Shiraz Viognier co-fermentation, produced from a selection of the best grapes in a single twelve hectare vineyard. The two grape types in this wine are co-fermented, with around five to ten percent Viognier and the rest Shiraz, depending on vintage conditions. This wine was first produced by Clonakilla in 1992 after Tim Kirk had spent time in the northern Rhone Valley, specifically visiting Guigal, and he decided that it was a style that he wanted to emulate and that it would be well suited to the Canberra region. The Shiraz Viognier is described by James Halliday as having "icon status" and as being the best example of this wine style in Australia. Jancis Robinson has identified it as the "pioneer" of the blend in Australia. It was recognised at the Outstanding level of the Langton's Classification of Australian Wine in 2005, and was elevated to the highest level of "Exceptional" in 2010.

Other red wines produced include two more Shiraz Viognier blends - an entry-level wine called "Hilltops", and the "O'Riada", named after Irish composer Seán Ó Riada, which sits in between the Hilltops and the flagship Shiraz Viognier as well as a Cabernet Sauvignon, Cabernet Franc and Merlot blend called "Ballinderry". There was also an experimental straight Shiraz released in 2006 and 2008 that spent an extra year in oak.

Clonakilla produces a number of white wines as well - Riesling, a Semillon-Sauvignon blanc blend as well as two straight Viogniers are made, with one Viognier bottling aged in stainless steel and the other aged in oak.

The logo displayed on the label of all the Clonakilla wines comes from the Book of Durrow, a seventh-century manuscript.
