= Taylors Wines =

Winery in Clare Valley, South Australia

- The original St Andrews vineyard
- Location: 89A Winery Road Auburn, South Australia, Australia
- Wine region: Clare Valley
- Other labels: Promised Land, Taylors Estate, Eighty Acres, Taylors Winemakers Project, Jaraman, St Andrews, Wakefield.
- Founded: 1969
- First vintage: 1973
- Known for: Taylors Estate Range
- Varietals: Cabernet Sauvignon, Shiraz, Merlot, Tempranillo, Pinot noir, Cabernet Shiraz, Vermentino, Chardonnay, Sauvignon blanc, Semillon Sauvignon blanc, Riesling, Gewurztraminer, Pinot gris, Muscat (grape and wine)
- Distribution: International
- Tasting: Open to the public
- Website: www.taylorswines.com.au

Taylors Wines is a family-owned winery established in 1969 and located in the Clare Valley of South Australia. Taylors is one of the founding members of the Australia's First Families of Wine. As of 2022, it was ranked the thirteenth-largest Australian wine company in terms of total revenue.

Taylors' first wine was the 1973 Taylors Cabernet Sauvignon. Taylors Wines is the largest holding in the Clare Valley. Due to trademark restrictions, Taylors Wines uses the name Wakefield Wines in the majority of the Northern Hemisphere.

== History ==
The original 178-hectare vineyard was founded in 1969 by Bill Taylor, Sr. and his sons, Bill and John, and is located by the Wakefield River in the Clare Valley, South Australia.

=== Seahorses ===
The three seahorse logo of Taylors and Wakefield wines came through a discovery in the vineyard. While excavating the vineyard dam, the family found fossilised remains of seahorses, signifying the area had once been part of an inland sea. Today, the three seahorses represent the three generations of Taylors winemakers.

=== Clare Valley ===
The Clare Valley is "Situated in the northern Mt Lofty Ranges. South Australia's Clare Valley was settled in the late 1830s with the first vineyards planted and wines produced in the early 1840s." The region is home to a large number of vineyards and grows a wide variety of grape varieties though it is renowned for its Riesling, Cabernet Sauvignon and Shiraz. South Australia has the most wine activity of all the states in Australia.

=== Vineyard ===
Taylors Vineyard in The Clare Valley

The Taylor family vineyard is located in the Clare Valley, more specifically in the sub-region of Auburn, and stretches to the Watervale border. "It is 350 meters above sea level and the climate is often described as Mediterranean due to the cool maritime breezes originating from the Gulf of St Vincent situated only 60 kilometres to the West."

== Ranges ==
Taylors Wines has 10 different ranges all of which have different wine varietals and blends.

== Varietals ==
Shiraz, Cabernet Sauvignon, Tempranillo, Merlot, Pinot noir, Cabernet Merlot, Sauvignon blanc, Semillon, Riesling, Chardonnay, Gewurztraminer, Vermentino and Pinot gris.

== Australia's First Families of Wine ==
"Launched in 2009 Australia's First Families of Wine (AFFW) is an initiative created by 12 family-owned Australian wineries to educate consumers about Australian wine. Together the families represent 16 Australian regions across four states and more than 200 years of winemaking experience."

== Environment ==
Taylors Wines has won multiple awards for its environmental initiatives and sustainability practices. In 2010 Taylors Wines won the Banksia Environmental Foundation Award for sustainability. In the same year the company also won the Environmental and Energy Management Award in the NAB Agribusiness Awards and is the first company to release a range of 100% carbon neutral wines compliant to the international standard for Life Cycle Assessment (ISO14044).

Other awards won by Taylors Wines due to their environmental practices include:

- Winner of the Best Green Launch – 2010 The Drinks Business Magazine Green Awards
- Carter Holt Harvey Sustainability Award – Silver Medal – 2010 Australian Packaging Awards

== Awards ==
- Taylors Wines has received multiple international awards for its wines. "To date the company has won more than 3300 medals including 44 Trophies, 327 Gold and 819 Silver Medals."
- The vineyard was also given the highest rating of five red stars by James Halliday in the 2012 Wine Companion

== Community initiatives ==
=== St Andrews Hospital ===
Taylors Wines has been associated with the St Andrews Hospital in South Australia since 1990.

=== Art Gallery of New South Wales ===
Taylors Wines has been a sponsor of the Art Gallery of New South Wales Society of NSW for over two decades.

=== The Wallabies – Australia's national rugby union team ===
Taylors Wines are the official wine behind Australia national rugby union team, the Wallabies, and the exclusive wine partner of the Rugby Union Players' Association (RUPA).

== See also ==
- Australian wine
- Cult wine
- South Australian wine
- Australia's First Families of Wine
