= Crouchen =

Variety of grape

- Grape (Vitis)
- Color of berry skin: Blanc
- Species: Vitis vinifera
- Also called: See list of synonyms
- Origin: France
- Notable regions: Australia, South Africa
- VIVC number: 3264

Crouchen is a white South African and Australian wine grape variety that originated in the western Pyrenees of France but is now virtually extinct in France due to its high susceptibility to fungal diseases like powdery and downy mildew. The grape is known under a wide variety of synonyms including Clare Riesling and Cape Riesling though it is not related to the well known international variety Riesling. Recent European Union regulation aimed at standardizing wine labelling laws has encouraged wineries to move away from these synonyms but their use still persists.

== History ==
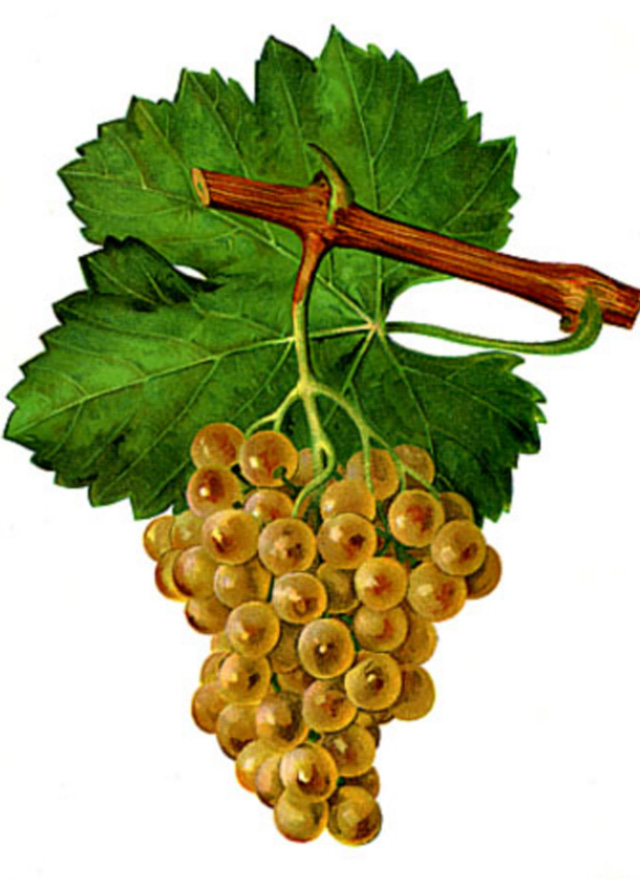
Semillon

Records indicate that Crouchen was first shipped from France to the Clare Valley in South Australia in 1850. From there the grape became misidentified as both Semillon and Riesling before eventually being considered by the Australians to be a new variety known as Clare Riesling. In 1976 ampelographer Paul Truel positively identified the vines growing in Australia as the French variety Crouchen.

== Wine regions ==
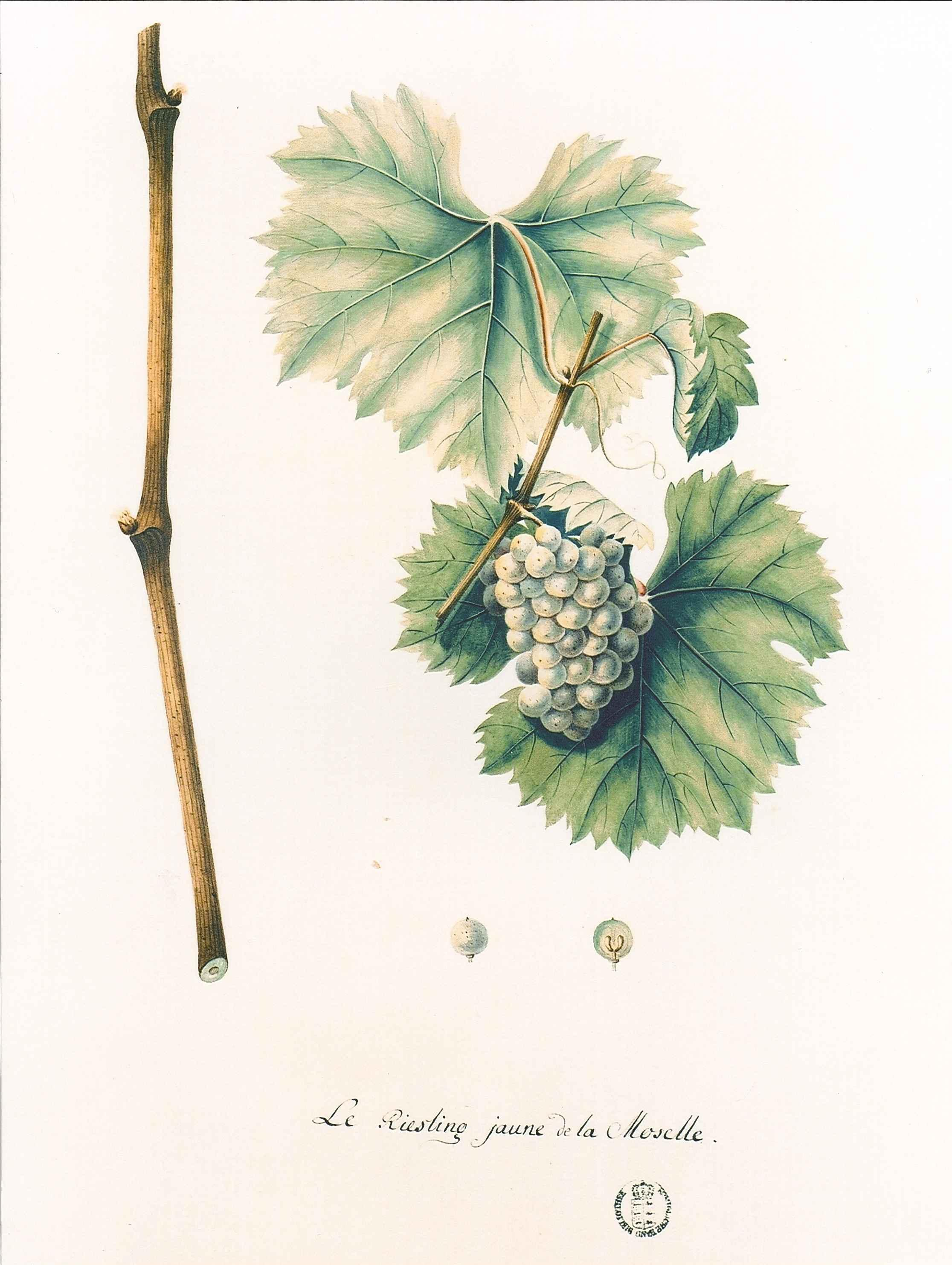
Riesling

In the early 1990s, there were over 1,000 acres (420 hectares) of Crouchen growing throughout Australia but its numbers have been steadily declining over the past few decades. Here is it is primarily used as a blending variety to enhance the aromas of white wines.

It is still widely grown in South Africa, accounting for almost 3% of all of South Africa's vineyards, with more than 7,900 acres (3,200 ha) planted mostly in the Paarl and Stellenbosch regions. Here the variety is known as Cape Riesling but is often simply called Riesling as opposed to the German wine grape Riesling that is known in South Africa as Weisser or White Riesling. Wine expert Jancis Robinson notes that some examples of Cape Riesling do have the potential to age and improve in the bottle. Oz Clarke notes that some the best examples of Crouchen can be "fairly steely".

== Synonyms ==
Crouchen is also known under the synonyms Basque, Cape Riesling, Cheri Cerratia, Clare Riesling, Cougnet, Crochenta, Crouchen Blanc, Cruchen, Cruchen Blanc, Cruchenta, Cruchenton Blanc, Grand Blanc, Hondarribi Zuri, Kaapse Riesling, Messanges Blanc, Navarre Blanc, Paarl Riesling, Riesling, Riesling Vert, S. A. Riesling, Sable Blanc, Sales Blanc, Trouchet Blanc, and Zurizerratia.
