= Sparkling Shiraz =

Australian wine style

Sparkling Shiraz is an Australian wine style. The wine style has been claimed to have been created in 1895 by Edmond Mazure. Before the enforcement of appellations d'origine contrôlée, the style was called Sparkling Burgundy.

The wine begins as a Shiraz on its first fermentation. Its secondary fermentation takes place in its bottle, or méthode champenoise.

The Sparkling Shiraz style has been described as "uniquely Australian".

== See also ==
- Australian wine
