= D'Arenberg =

Winery in South Australia

d'Arenberg
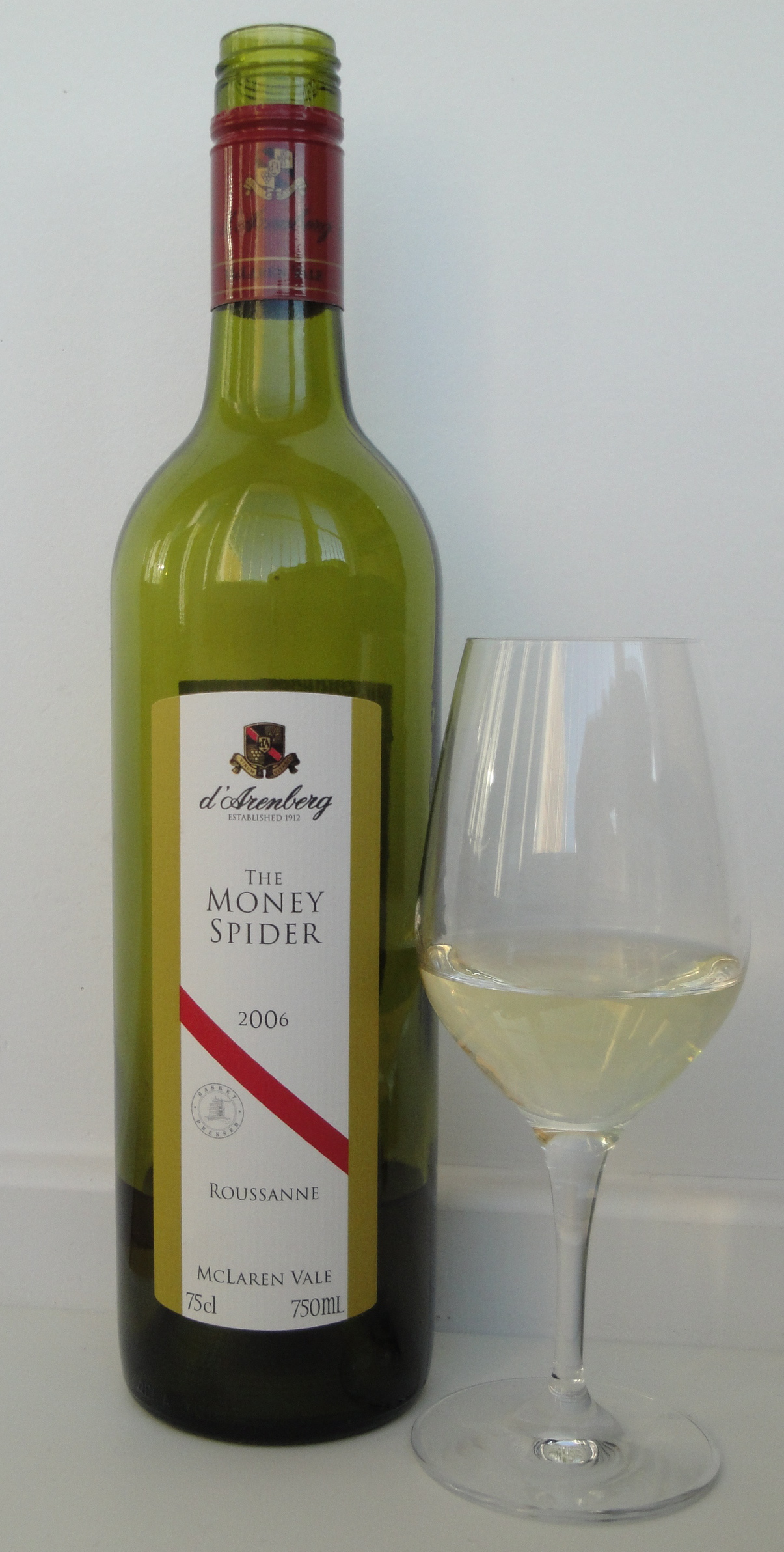
- A d'Arenberg wine, a varietal Roussanne.
- Location: McLaren Vale, South Australia, Australia
- Coordinates: 35°11′53.1″S 138°32′51.1″E
- Wine region: McLaren Vale ( part of the Fleurieu zone)
- Website: www.darenberg.com.au

d'Arenberg is an Australian wine company founded in 1912. All of its vineyards are located in South Australia's McLaren Vale wine region, although some of the wines they make are produced from grapes sourced from the Adelaide Hills wine region and other parts of the Fleurieu zone. It is now owned by the fourth generation of the Osborn family, headed by Chester Osborn. d'Arenberg are known for the quirky names of their wines, and their specialism in the vines of the Rhône valley. They also produce many of their wines in a traditional manner, using basket pressing for both reds and whites (the only winery in Australia to do so) and leaving the vast majority of the red wines unfiltered and unfined which can cause the wine to throw a sediment in bottle but leaves the flavour intact. The majority of their red wines are suitable for ageing as well as for drinking fairly young and even the cheaper wines show very well after a few years in bottle. Perhaps their best known wine is 'The Dead Arm Shiraz', made from fungus-infected shiraz grape vines.

In 2009 D'Arenberg joined Australian wine alliance First Families of Wine.

== The Dead Arm Shiraz ==
The term "Dead Arm" comes from the disease Eutypa lata which is common in many older vineyards. Eutypa Lata causes grape canker which slowly kills one of the branches of a vine. This reduces the yield of the vine and intensifies the flavour. The grapes for the Dead Arm Shiraz come from these vines in the McLaren Vale region of South Australia. The wine is very rich and full bodied. In recent years, it has become somewhat popular due to good reviews in The Wine Spectator and other publications, as well as an increased worldwide interest in Australian wine.

== d'Arenberg Cube ==
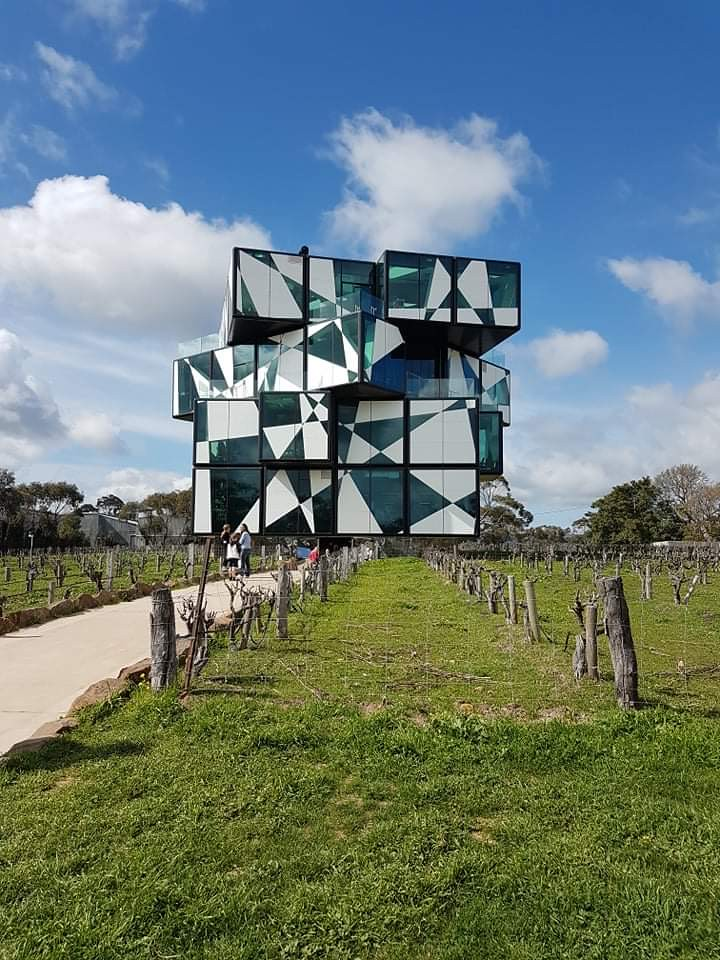
d'Arenberg Cube, McLaren Vale, South Australia

The d'Arenberg Cube is a five-storey building situated within the d'Arenberg vineyards on Osborn Road and was designed by Chief Winemaker Chester Osborn. Completed in 2017, the building contains a restaurant known as Sensorial Circus, a wine sensory room, a virtual fermenter, a 360-degree video room and the Alternate Realities Museum, which features numerous art installations.

== See also ==
- Australian wine
- Cult wine
- South Australian wine
- List of wineries in McLaren Vale
- Australia's First Families of Wine
