= Henschke =

Winery in South Australia

- Location: Keyneton, South Australia, South Australia, Australia
- Coordinates: 34°31′15″S 139°09′03″E
- Wine region: Eden Valley
- Founded: 1868
- Key people: Johann Christian Henschke, Cyril Alfred Henschke, Stephen Henschke (winemaker)
- Cases/yr: 40,000
- Known for: Hill of Grace
- Varietals: Semillon, Riesling, Chardonnay, Cabernet Sauvignon, Shiraz
- Website: www.henschke.com.au

Henschke is a family-owned, 158-year-old Australian winery, located in Keyneton, South Australia in the Eden Valley wine region. It produces the 'Hill of Grace', one of Australia's "cult wines", and was considered Australia's second best wine by James Halliday in 2009.

== History ==
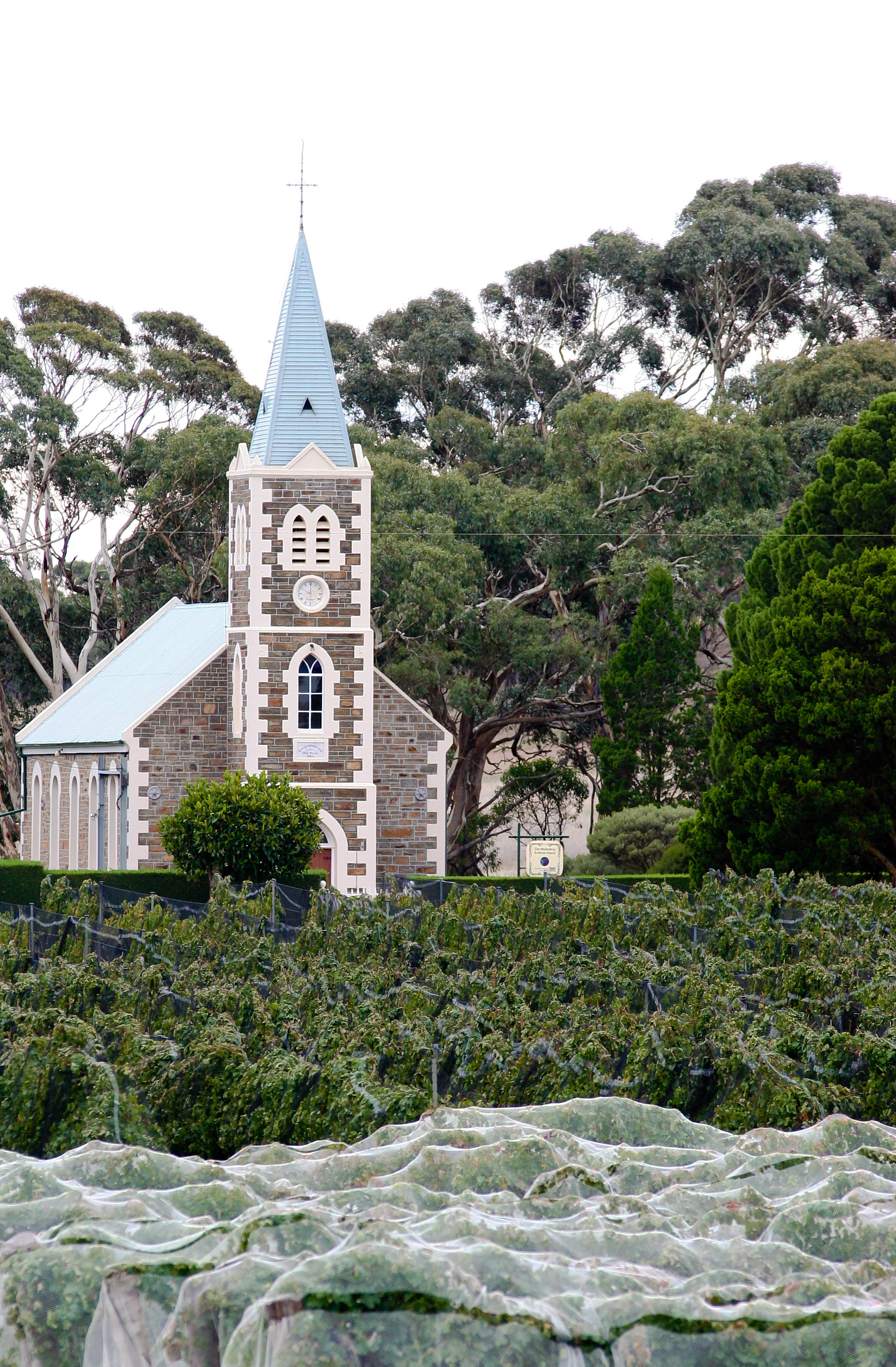
Gnadenberg Church and the Hill of Grace vineyard

Johann Christian Henschke, born on 24 December 1803, was from Silesia, and fled his homeland for Australia in 1841. In 1862 he purchased land in what now is called Keyneton. In 1868 he produced the first vintage of about 300 gallons of wine. In 1891 his son Paul Gotthard Henschke bought some land near the Gnadenberg Church; that land is now known as 'the Hill of Grace vineyard'. In the 1950s, Henschke started focusing on table wine instead of fortified wine that was more common in Australia at that time. In 1979 Stephen and Prue Henschke took over the running of the winery after Stephen's father Cyril died.

In 2009, Henschke was asked to join Australian wine alliance, Australia's First Families of Wine.

== Wines ==
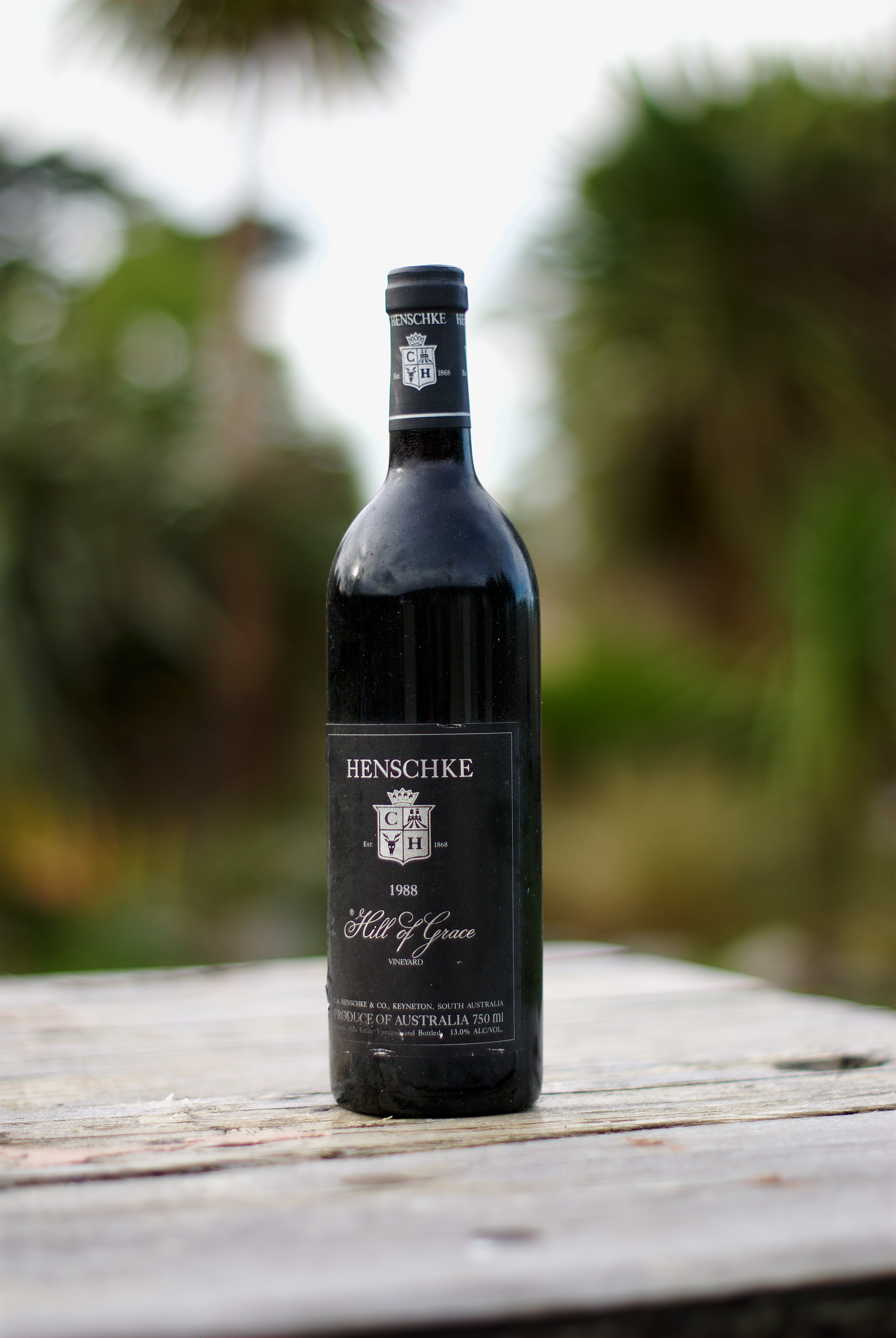
1988 Hill of Grace

Henschke is best known for 'Hill of Grace', a Shiraz based wine first produced in the 1958 vintage, which was classified as "Exceptional", the highest ranking in Langton’s Classification of Australian Wine, in 2005. Hill of Grace is produced from vines planted in the 1860s. Henscke also produces a wide range of other wines; many are from shiraz grapes, but there are also wines and blends from cabernet sauvignon, pinot noir, merlot, grenache, mourvèdre, cabernet franc, semillon, chardonnay, riesling, gewürztraminer, viognier, pinot gris and muscat.

== See also ==
- Australian wine
- Cult wine
- South Australian wine
- List of wineries in the Eden Valley
- Australia's First Families of Wine
