= Langton's Classification of Australian Wine =

Listing of rating of Australian wine

Langton's logo

Langton's Classification of Australian Wine is a listing of fine Australian wines compiled by wine-specialist auction house and online merchant Langton's. The Classification is a ranking of the best-performing Australian wines based on secondary market support over a minimum of 10 vintages. It was first published in 1991. The Classification is divided into three categories - Exceptional, Outstanding and Excellent - and new editions have appeared at intervals of approximately five years. The seventh edition was published in August 2018 and includes 136 of Australia's finest wines. Editions of the classification are identified by Roman numerals.

Langton's was previously owned by the Woolworths conglomerate from 2009, until 2021 when it was spun off with other liquor businesses to make Endeavour Group.

== Langton's Classification of Australian Wine VII ==
The most recent Classification was released in August 2018. Classification VII has three tiers; the Classification V had four tiers. The new tiers are

- Exceptional: 22 wines in 2018
- Outstanding: 42 wines in 2018
- Excellent: 68 wines in 2018

== History of the classification ==
The first Classification was published in 1991, Langton's Classification of Distinguished Australian Wine I, had its background in a publication from 1990, the Langton's Vintage Wine Price Guide. In the 1991 classification, 34 wines were classified using three categories: Outstanding (A), Outstanding (B), and Excellent. Only one wine was classified as Outstanding (A): Penfolds Grange Shiraz.

Langton's sees its classification as "loosely modelled on the Bordeaux Classification of 1855", but with its regular reclassifications it is more similar to the Classification of Saint-Émilion wine, although with several differences: no official governmental recognition, a much wider geographic scope, and with several different wine styles classified using the same categories.

Langton's Classification of Distinguished Australian Wine II was published in 1996, and included 64 wines in four categories: Outstanding A (three wines), Outstanding, Excellent A, and Excellent.

Langton's Classification of Australian Wine III was published in 2000, and included 89 wines in the four categories also used for classifications IV and V; Exceptional (seven wines), Outstanding, Excellent, and Distinguished. From classification III, fortified wines ("Port") were no longer included. This changed with the addition of Seppeltsfield 100 Year Old Para Vintage Tawny for Classification V in 2010.

Langton's Classification of Australian Wine IV of 2005 included 101 wines, of which 11 at the Exceptional level.

In 2009, Langton's was purchased by the Woolworths conglomerate. Despite concerns raised at the Australian Competition & Consumer Commission, the purchase went ahead, and Woolworths therefore owns the Classification.

So far (2018), no wine included in the top ("Exceptional") category has ever been demoted; this category remains the smallest but has progressively expanded to include additional wines with each edition of the Classification.

== "Exceptional" category ==
In the Classification VI (2018), the following 22 wines are included in the "Exceptional" category. The year when the wines were included in the Exceptional category (or its predecessor "Outstanding A") is indicated.

Vineyard	Wine	Location	Year of first inclusion	Edition of first inclusion
Penfolds	Bin 95 Grange Shiraz	South Australia	1991	I
Henschke	Hill of Grace Shiraz	Eden Valley, South Australia	1996	II
Mount Mary Vineyard	Quintet Cabernet Blend	Yarra Valley, Victoria	1996	II
Leeuwin Estate	Art Series Chardonnay	Margaret River, Western Australia	2000	III
Moss Wood	Cabernet Sauvignon	Margaret River, Western Australia	2000	III
Penfolds	Bin 707 Cabernet Sauvignon	South Australia	2000	III
Wendouree	Shiraz	Clare Valley, South Australia	2000	III
Bass Phillip	Reserve Pinot Noir	South Gippsland, Victoria	2005	IV
Cullen Wines	Diana Madeline Cabernet Merlot	Margaret River, Western Australia	2005	IV
Giaconda	Chardonnay	Beechworth, Victoria	2005	IV
Rockford Wines	Basket Press Shiraz	Barossa Valley, South Australia	2005	IV
Brokenwood	Graveyard Vineyard Shiraz	Hunter Valley, New South Wales	2010	V
Chris Ringland	Dry Grown Barossa Ranges Shiraz	Barossa Valley, South Australia	2010	V
Clarendon Hills	Astralis Syrah	McLaren Vale, South Australia	2010	V
Clonakilla	Shiraz Viognier	Canberra District, New South Wales	2010	V
Grosset Wines	Polish Hill Riesling	Clare Valley, South Australia	2010	V
Torbreck	RunRig Shiraz	Barossa Valley, South Australia	2010	V
Henschke	Mount Edelstone Shiraz	Eden Valley, South Australia	2014	VI
Jim Barry Wines	The Armagh Shiraz	Clare Valley, South Australia	2014	VI
Seppeltsfield	100 Year Old Para Vintage Tawny	Barossa Valley, South Australia	2014	VI
Wynns Coonawarra Estate	John Riddoch Cabernet Sauvignon	Coonawarra, South Australia	2014	VI
Best's Great Western	Thomson Family Shiraz	Grampians, Victoria	2018	VII

== See also ==
- Australian wine
- Classification of wine
